= Magruder Plots =

Experimental winter wheat field plots in Oklahoma, US

- U.S. National Register of Historic Places
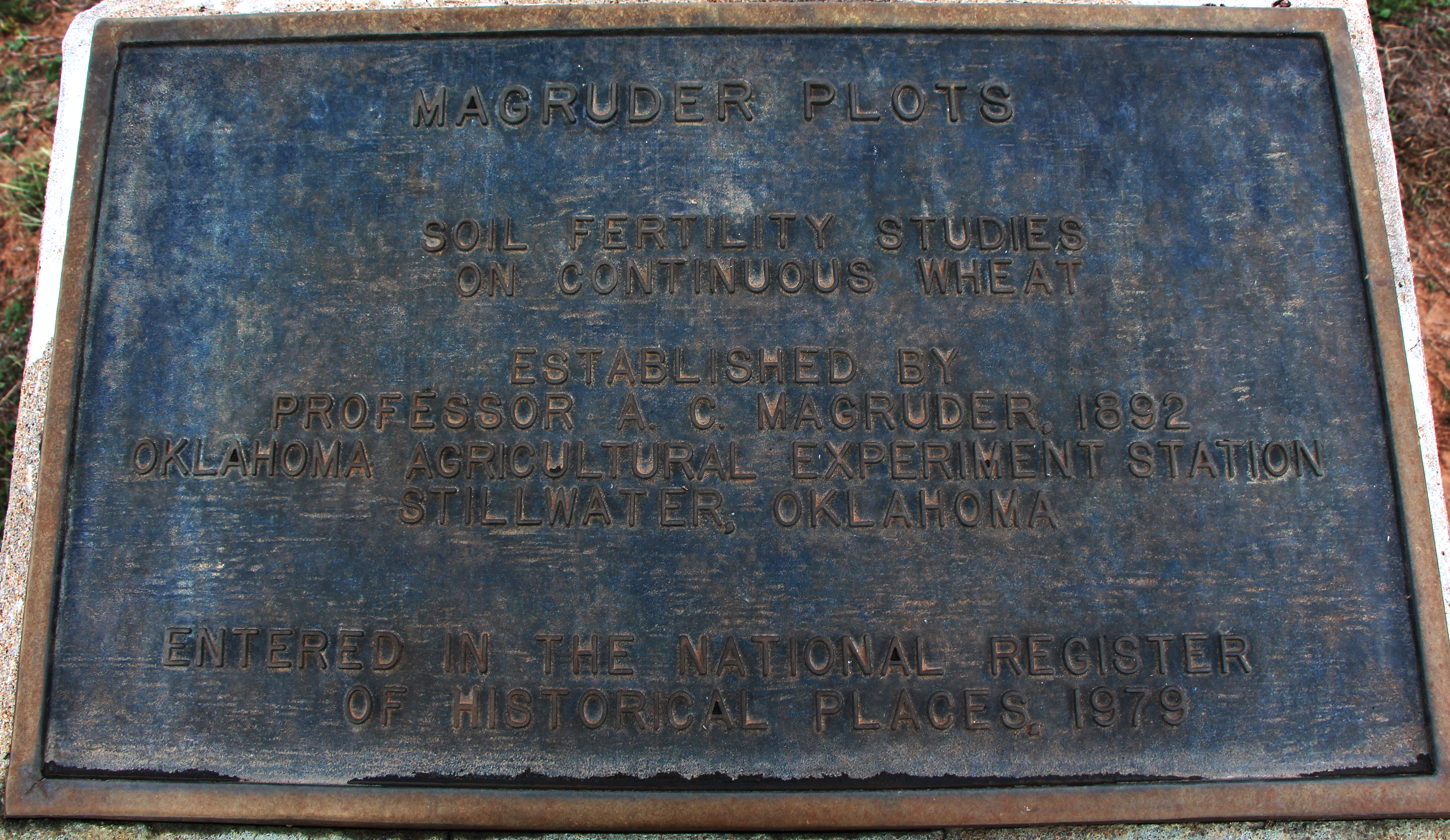
- Magruder Plot Plaque

- Location within Oklahoma
- Location: Payne County, Oklahoma
- Nearest city: Stillwater, Oklahoma
- Coordinates: 36°7′1″N 97°5′15″W
- Built: 1892
- NRHP reference No.: 79002018
- Added to NRHP: August 29, 1979

The Magruder Plots are experimental winter wheat field plots at Oklahoma State University established in 1892. They are the third longest-running such field trial in the United States, following the Morrow Plots established in 1876 at the University of Illinois at Urbana–Champaign (on corn), and the Sanborn Field established in 1888 at the University of Missouri (on grain crops and forage). They are examples of long-term experiments.

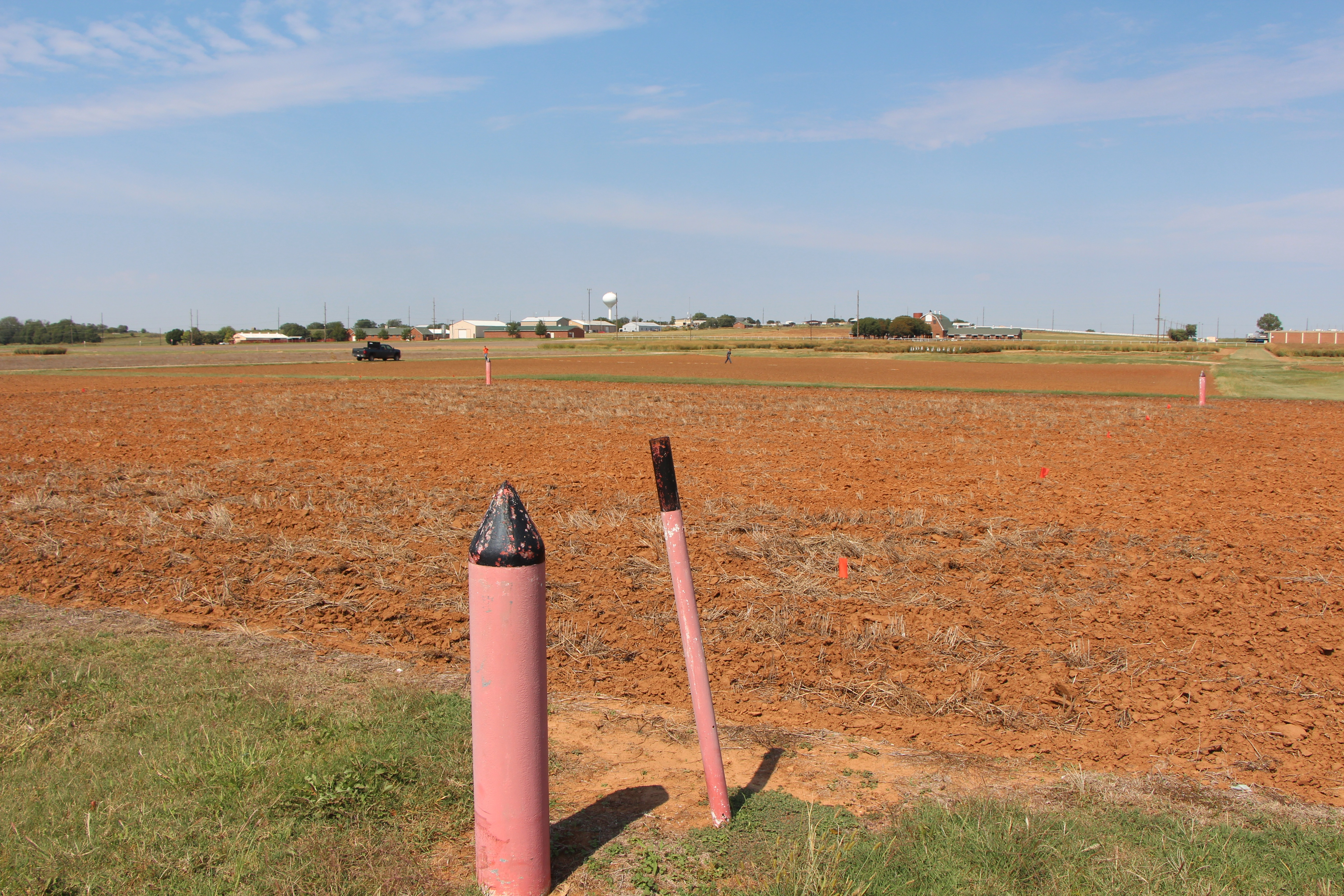
Boundaries of Plots indicated by pink posts. Note unfertilized "check" area in center of photo denoted by lack of stubble

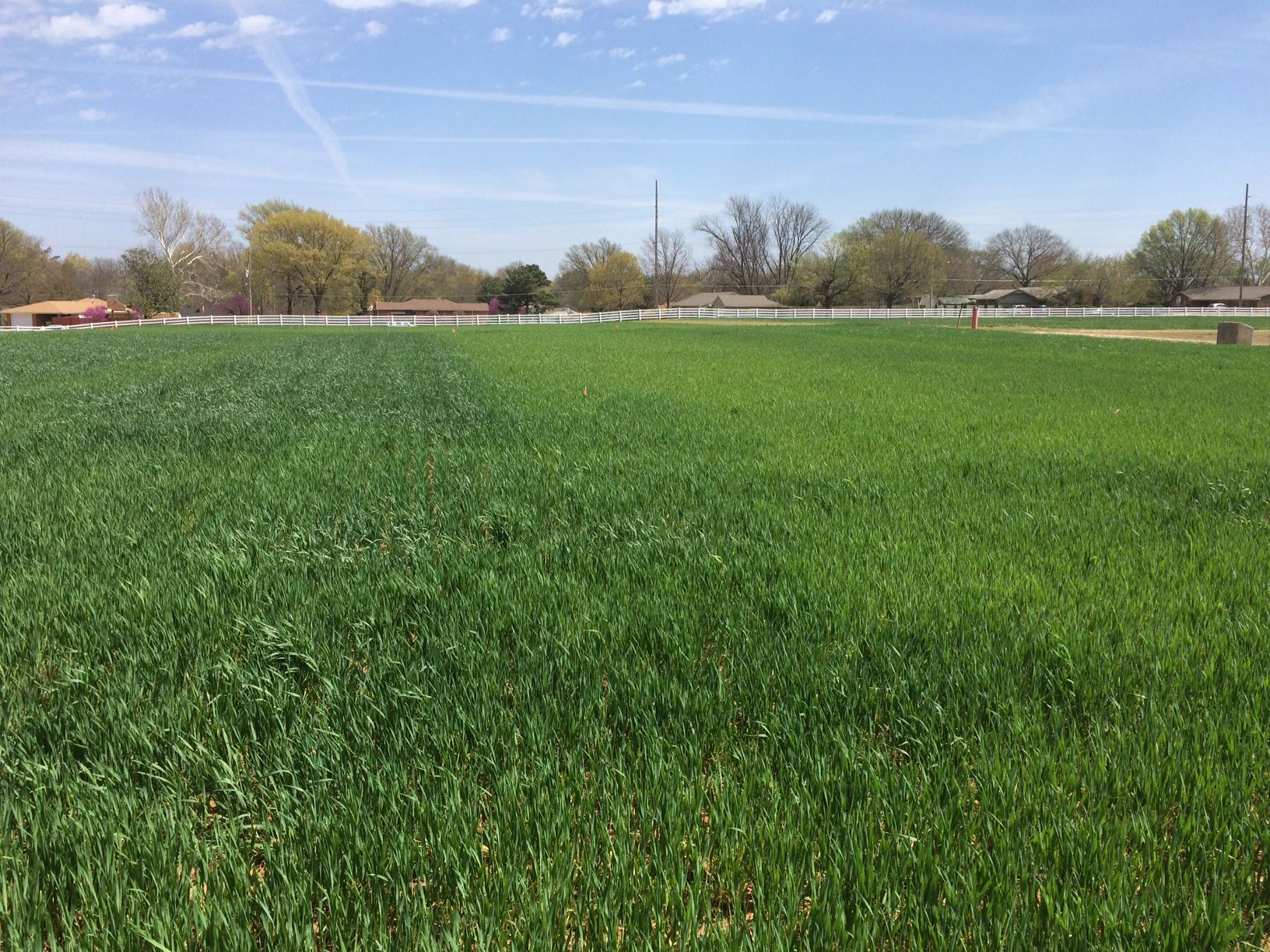
Photo taken April 2, 2015. Note unfertilized plot to right, clearly showing yellowed wheat growth compared to fertilized on left

Originally planted in the fall of 1892 by A. C. Magruder, first professor of agriculture at Oklahoma A & M (now Oklahoma State University), these plots were established to obtain information on the ability of the soil to continue to produce good yields of wheat without fertilization.

Researchers have conducted hundreds of experiments comparing various fertilizer treatments with manure applications and without such treatments. The plots became the center for wheat soil research in the region and provided constant data which helped farmers get maximum yield from their arid climates and naturally dry soils.

== Changes over time ==
For the past 122 years there have been several changes in the Magruder Plots.

Between 1893 and 1898, the field was not fertilized and the yield data were taken from the 1.25-acre plot as a unit.

The plots were divided in the summer of 1899, and yields were taken separately from the north and south halves to allow measurement of soil variability. Between 1899 and 1929, the south half was fertilized with barnyard manure and north half left unfertilized. No commercial fertilizer was used.

From 1930 to 1947, ten treatments were evaluated. Six of the ten treatments have been continued to the present. From 1930 to 1937 the check plot continued to produce near maximum yield; that was not the case from 1938 to 1947.

In 1947, university officials decided that the area where the soil plots were located had to be used for space for a new dormitory. That year the soils were moved to the present location. Before the construction of the dormitory, university officials dispatched workers to carefully move the surface and immediate subsurface soils from six of the ten main plots to a location about one mile west on the OSU agronomy farm. The reddish clay subsoil under the new location was similar to the subsoil under the original plot. Dr. Horace J. Harper, agronomist in charge of the plots for 1926 to 1951, described the task of moving the soil as follows: "The top eight inches of soil was removed with a bulldozer from an area of 100 feet in length near the center of each plot and was piled on each end of that plot. The subsurface soil from 8 to 16 inches was excavated and transferred to prepared trenches dug in a east-west direction on the agronomy farm". Studies conducted on the site after the move, when compared to similar studies conducted before the soil was tampered with, have shown that moving the plots of soil did not cause significant change in their relative crop-producing capacities. No evidence has indicated that the move disturbed the soil or hindered the research value of the area, which continues to be used for its original purpose.

Six of the ten treatments (check since 1892, manure since 1899, P, NP, NPK, and NPKL since 1929) were moved to their present location. The response to N over P remained small over this time.

From 1958 to 1967, wheat grain yield increased substantially as a result of applying N in addition to P.

In 1968, N rates were doubled in all the treatments except the unfertilized check as a result of increased yield potential of newer varieties.

From 1978 to 1987, this was the last period where moderate increases in grain yield were observed as a result of applying on P versus the check.

From 1988 to 1994, wheat grain yield increases were first detected as a result of applying K.

After 122 years of continuous winter wheat production under conventional tillage, the check plot that has never received any fertilization continues to produce yields greater than 1 Mg/ha. Despite the decline in soil organic matter from 4 to 1% grain yields in the check continue to show slight increases, probably due to improved genetics.
