= Long-term experiment =

Scientific study over long time period

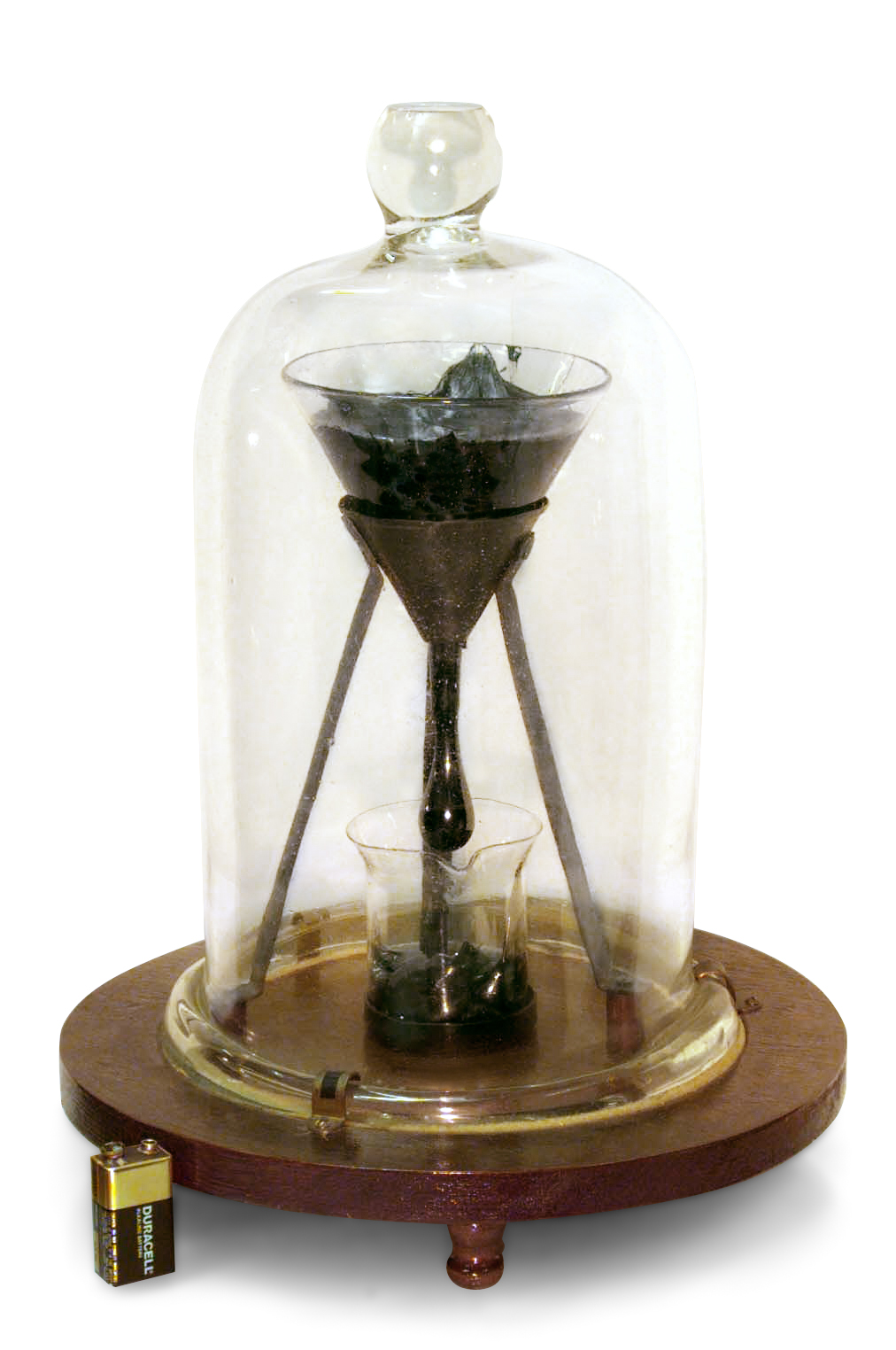
The University of Queensland pitch drop experiment has been ongoing since 1927.

A long-term experiment is an experimental procedure that runs through a long period of time, in order to test a hypothesis or observe a phenomenon that takes place at an extremely slow rate. What duration is considered "long" depends on the academic discipline. For example, several agricultural field experiments have run for more than 100 years, but much shorter experiments may qualify as "long-term" in other disciplines. An experiment is "a set of actions and observations", implying that one or more treatments (fertilizer, subsidized school lunches, etc.) is imposed on the system under study. Long-term experiments therefore contrast with nonexperimental long-term studies in which manipulation of the system studied is impossible (e.g. Jupiter's Great Red Spot) or undesirable (e.g. field observations of chimpanzee behavior).

== In physics ==
The Oxford Electric Bell has been ringing at Oxford University since 1840, although there is some reason to believe it may be 15 years older.

The Beverly Clock at the University of Otago has been running since 1864.

The pitch drop experiment has been running at the University of Queensland since 1927.

== In botany ==
The William James Beal Germination Experiment has been running since 1879. It is the oldest on-going experiment in botany. It is scheduled for completion in 2100.

The Godwin Plots experiment at the Wicken Fen reserve in Cambridgeshire, England, has been running since the 1920s and explores the differences between areas of vegetation which are never cut, and respectively all four, three or two years and every year.

== In agricultural research ==
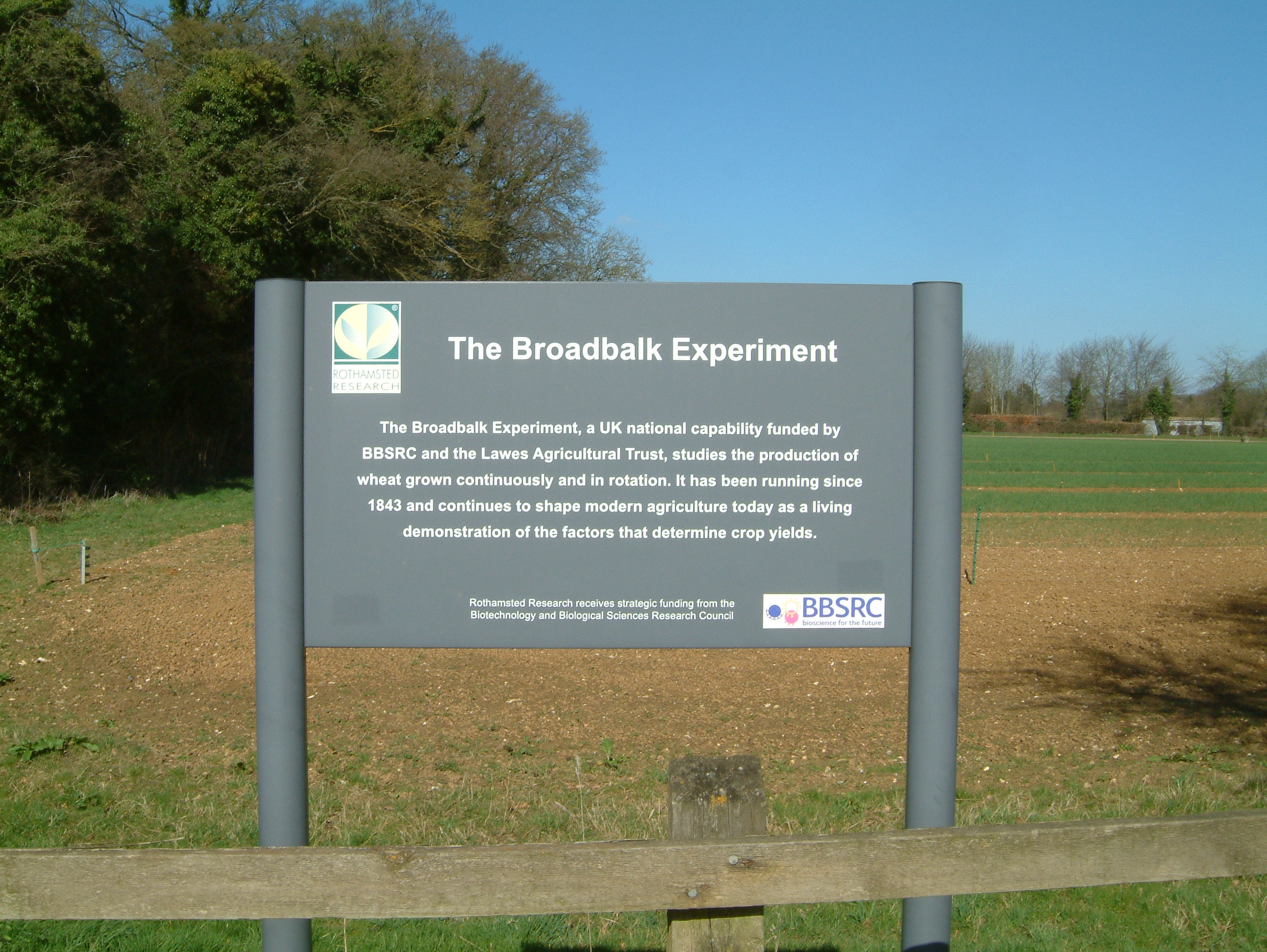
Broadbalk Experiment Rothamsted

Long-term experiments test the sustainability of different farming practices, as measured by yield trends over decades. Examples include the Park Grass Experiment at Rothamsted Experimental Station (1843–present), the Morrow Plots (1876–present) at the University of Illinois at Urbana–Champaign, Sanborn Field at the University of Missouri (1888-present), the Magruder Plots (1892–present) at Oklahoma State University, Auburn's Old Rotation (1896–present), and the Haughley Experiment (1939–1982?).

Experiments at Rothamsted showed that "grain yields can be sustained (and even increased) for almost 150 years in monocultures of wheat and barley given organic or inorganic fertilizer annually". These results show that practices considered unsustainable by some advocates of sustainable agriculture may preserve "the ability of a farm to produce perpetually", at least under some circumstances. But even if crop diversity in space or time (crop rotation) and organic inputs are not always essential to sustainability, there is abundant evidence from Rothamsted and elsewhere that they are often beneficial. Rothamsted has more recently (2017) started a new long term experiment, the Large Scale Rotation Experiment, to better understand the trade-offs involved with more regenerative approaches to agriculture such as no-till, crop rotations and green composting.

An experiment in alpine pasture has been ongoing in Switzerland at Schynige Platte from the 1920s looking at the human effect on the alpine environment.

The Haughley Experiment was noteworthy as a rare example of a long-term experiment in organic farming without external inputs of nutrients. After about 30 years, however, it was decided to start importing manure. There is some disagreement whether a "decline in relative yields from the organic section" was due to a depletion of soil nutrients.

Various short-term experiments have used legumes (in symbiosis with nitrogen-fixing rhizobia) as a nitrogen source, but good short-term yields do not prove the system is sustainable. The problem is that release of nitrogen from soil organic matter can make up any shortfall of nitrogen from legumes for a decade or more. The Old Rotation showed that nitrogen from legumes can balance nitrogen removed in a harvested crop over the long term. A key point is that the nitrogen in the legumes was not removed, as it would be with a soybean crop, but was plowed under as a green manure. In the Old Rotation, the green manure was grown during the winter to supply nitrogen to a summer crop (cotton); this would be less practical in colder climates.

Long-term agricultural experiments that have been started more recently include the Long-Term Research on Agricultural Systems experiments at UC Davis, started in 1993.

== In microbiology and evolutionary biology ==
=== In microbiology ===
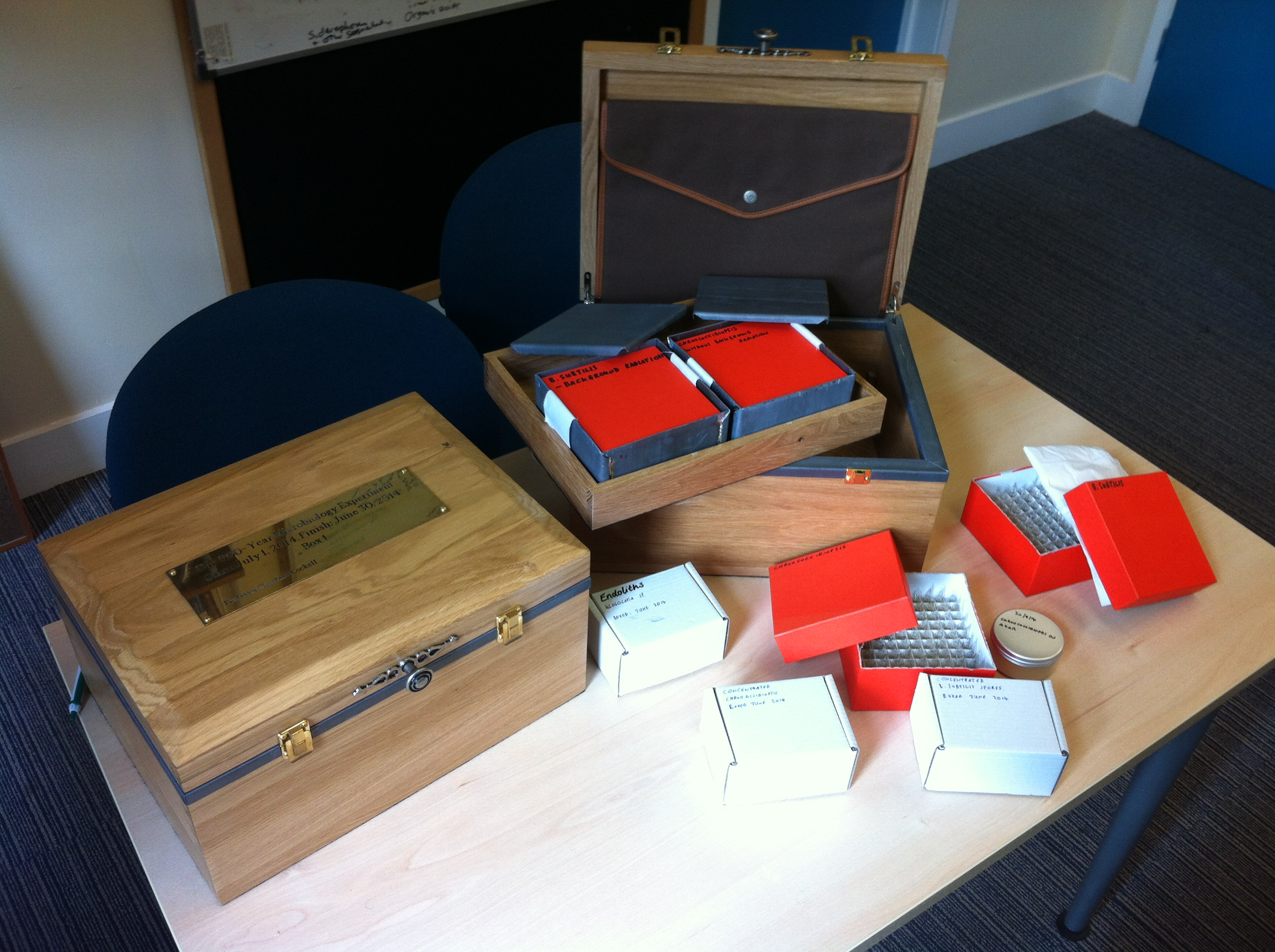
A photo showing the components of the 500-year microbiology experiment

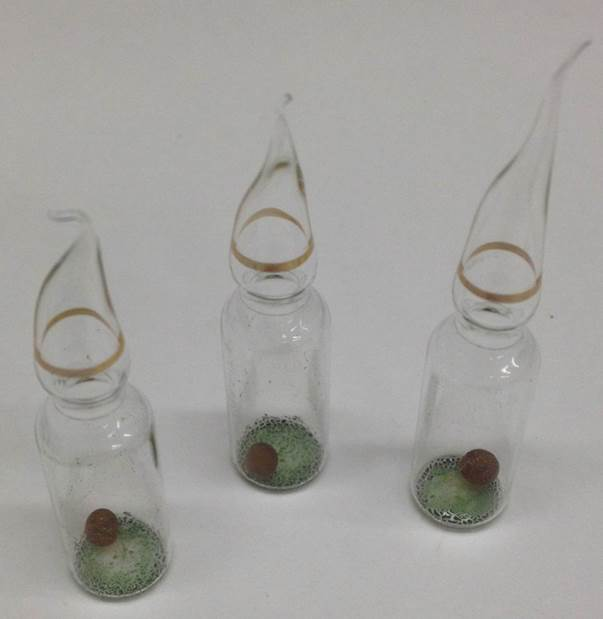
Chroococcidiopsis glass ampoules

At the UK Centre for Astrobiology within The University of Edinburgh and at the Institute of Aerospace Medicine with the German Aerospace Centre, Charles Cockell and Ralf Möller established the "500-Year Microbiology Experiment" that started in July 2014 to study the loss of viability of desiccation-resistant bacteria over long periods. The experiment involves the study of vegetative bacteria (the extreme tolerant cyanobacterium, Chroococcidiopsis sp.) and spore-forming bacteria (Bacillus subtilis).

The experiment comprises two oak wooden boxes containing duplicate samples, to be kept at the University of Edinburgh and the Natural History Museum. Every two years for the next 24 years, and thereafter every 25 years for the next 475 years, triplicate samples of both organisms contained within glass ampoules will be opened and the number of viable cells enumerated. The first time point was taken in 2014, and the last is intended to be taken on 30 June 2514. Within each box, the experiment is duplicated into a reduced and non-reduced background radiation experiment, with one set of samples being kept in a lead box to cut back background radiation, allowing the impact of radiation in combination with desiccation on viability to be studied over long periods. It was motivated by a desire to understand how microbes survive desiccation in deserts, rocks, permafrost and their potential survival in space. The destruction and pathways of degradation of biomolecules will also be studied. In addition to the core experiment, there are a variety of samples including dried agar plates and endoliths for investigation over long periods.

One of the wooden boxes was delivered to the Natural History Museum on 27 February 2015, and will be curated within the cyanobacterial collection.

=== In evolutionary biology ===
The E. coli long-term evolution experiment (LTEE), a study in experimental evolution initiated by Richard Lenski, has been underway since 1988 for more than 70,000 generations. Experiments with the evolution of maize under artificial selection for oil and protein content represent more years, but far fewer generations (only 65).

The domesticated silver fox, an ongoing breeding program since 1959 with dramatic results.

The "Dark Fly" experiment started by Syuichi Mori (Kyoto University) in 1954 studies evolution of common fruit fly reared in a constant dark room for 57 years (over 1400 generations). In 2012, the third successor of the experiment, Naoyuki Fuse, performed the full genome sequencing of the strain, and reported around 5% alterations from the wildlife strain.

== In ecology ==
The US National Science Foundation supports a number of long-term ecological experiments, mostly in ecosystems that are less directly affected by humans than most agricultural ecosystems are. See LTER. Within the UK the Ecological Continuity Trust works to promote and secure the future of long-term ecological experiments, maintaining a register of experiments where treatments have been applied for a minimum of six years.

A number of other areas, sometimes called involuntary parks, can be regarded as long time ecological experiments, because they have been abandoned by humans and returned to near-feral condition. These include areas abandoned for political reasons, such as the Korean Demilitarized Zone, or environmental contamination, such as the Chernobyl Nuclear Power Plant Exclusion Zone.

== In medicine and psychology ==
The Framingham Heart Study has been running continuously since 1948.

The Grant Study at the Laboratory of Adult Development in the Department of Psychiatry at Brigham and Women's Hospital, a Harvard Medical School affiliate, is conducting a longitudinal study of human adult development, by following two groups of individuals as they age (268 Harvard graduates and 456 males from inner-city Boston). The study has been ongoing since 1937 and is currently the longest running study of adult life ever conducted.
