= Rosalind Grimshaw =

English stained glass artist (1945–2020)

Rosalind Grimshaw BA FMGP (3 March 1945 - 11 November 2020) was a stained glass artist who lived in Clifton, Bristol looking towards the Clifton Suspension Bridge. Grimshaw had Parkinson's disease from her early 30s.

== Stained glass ==
In 1975, Grimshaw trained in the stained glass studio of Joseph Bell and Son in Bristol, founded in the Victorian Gothic Revival. Her art attracted a lot of interest.

In 1983, Grimshaw discovered she had Parkinson's disease, however, this did not daunt her. In 1996, Her Parkinsons was getting worse, so the family opened a workshop inside her house. Her masterpiece though was winning the completion to design the Six Days of Creation in the refectory in Chester Cathedral. There was a book about it.

Although most of her work was to private commission, her public works include stained glass in Derriford Hospital in Plymouth, Southmead Hospital in Bristol, St. Chad's, Seighford in Staffordshire, and St. Mary's, Balcombe in West Sussex.

Until her death, Grimshaw had spent around 10 years doing fused-glass work.

== Personal life ==
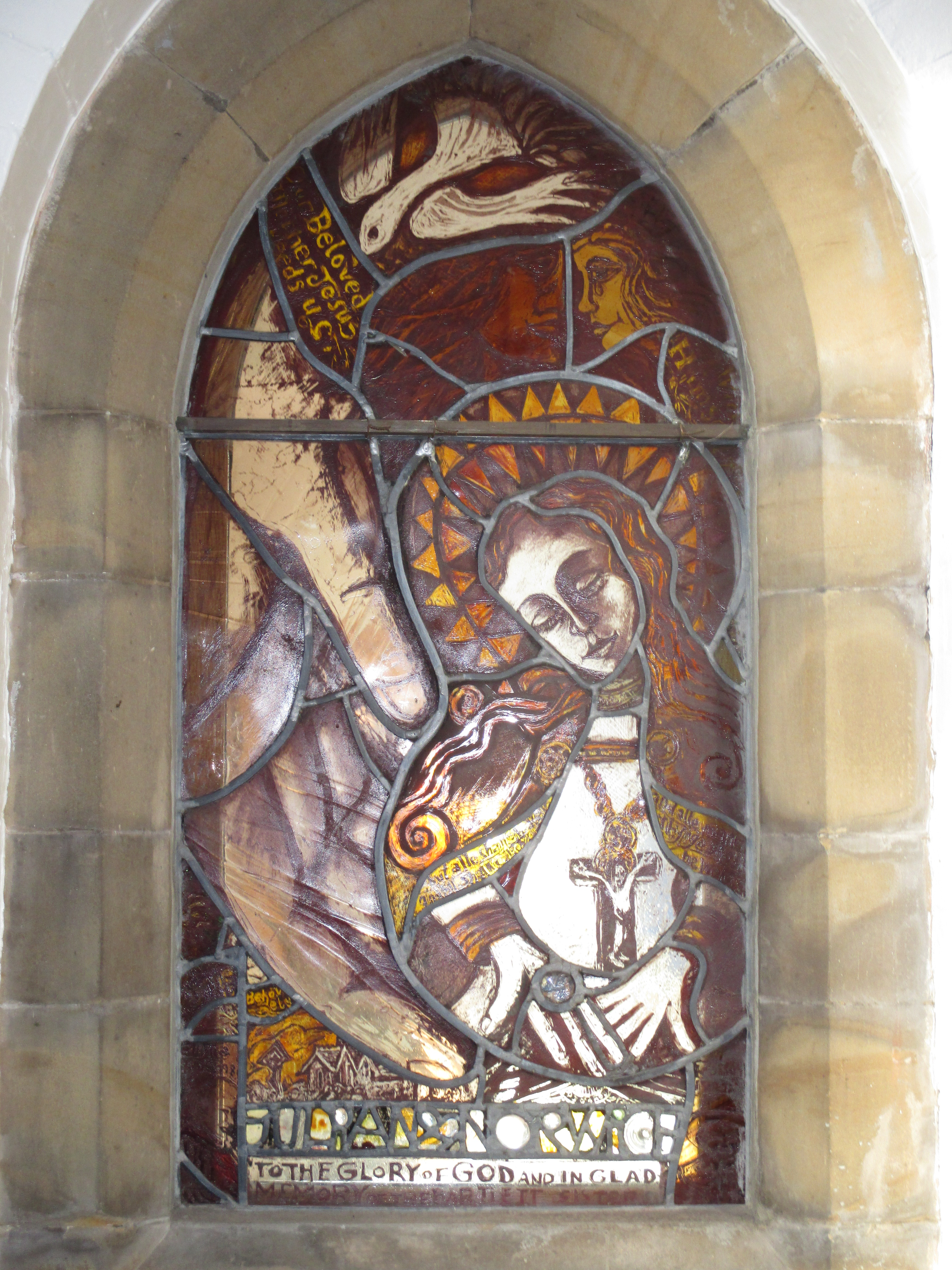
Julian of Norwich, portrayed on a stained glass window by Rosalind Grimshaw at St Augustine's Church, Scaynes Hill, West Sussex

Grimshaw, née Neuberger, was born in 1945 and brought up in Highpoint, Highgate with her brother Henry. She attended Camden School for Girls and University of Brighton. She married John Grimshaw in Africa.

Apart from her stained glass work, she was variously an Art Teacher, ran "Rainbow" (Arts & Crafts) shop in Clifton.
