= George E. Morrow =

American journalist

George Espy Morrow (October 19, 1840 – Mar 19, 1900) was an American academic from Ohio. Born into a notable political family, he fought in the Civil War before attending the University of Michigan Law School. After a decade as a newspaper editor, he became a professor at Iowa Agricultural College, eventually becoming chair of the College of Agriculture. In 1877, he took a similar position at the University of Illinois College of Agriculture, where he maintained an experimental field now known as the Morrow Plots, a National Historic Landmark. Morrow was president at the Oklahoma Agricultural and Mechanical College from 1895 to 1899.

== Biography ==
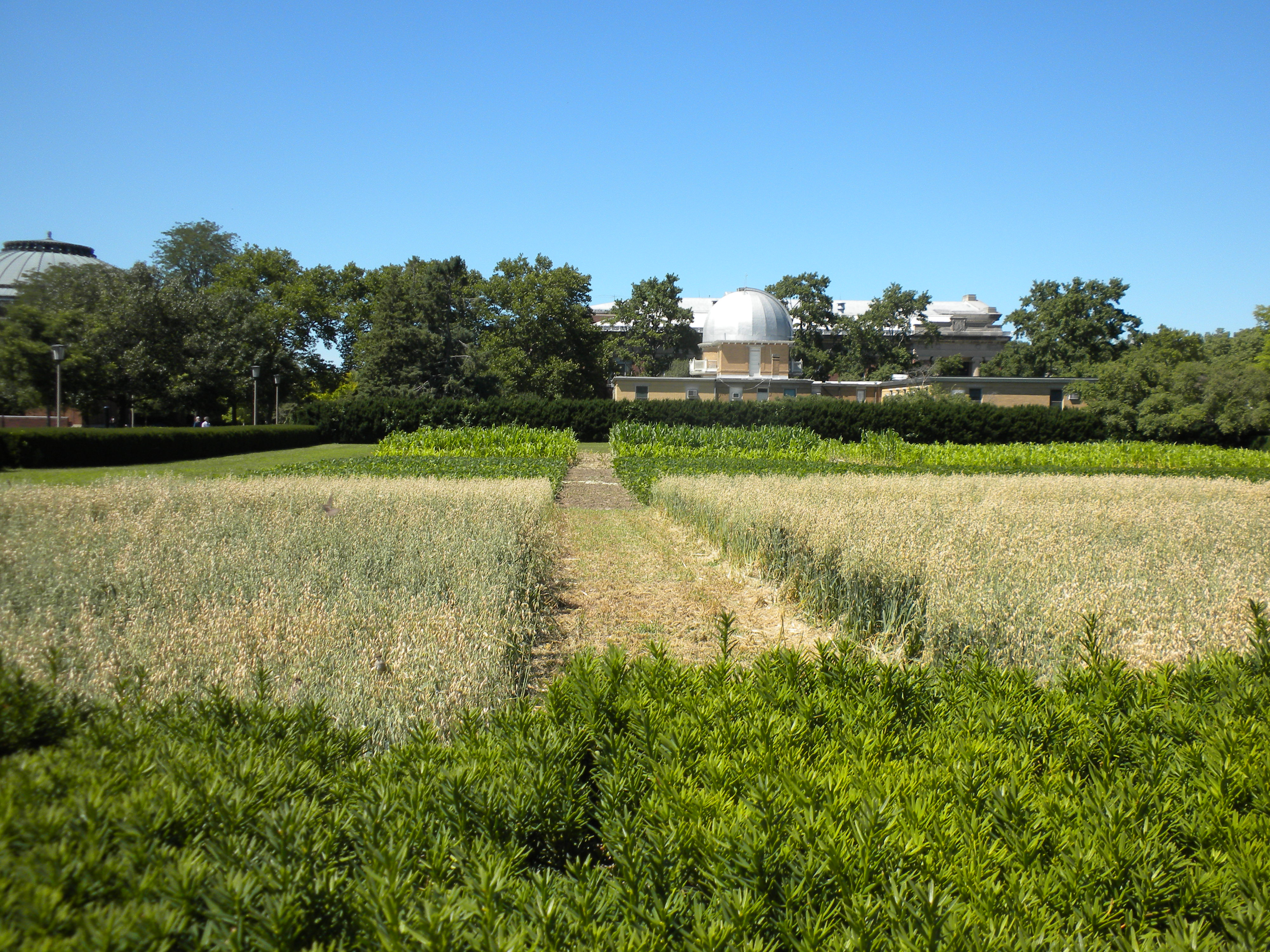
Morrow Plots

Morrow was born near Cincinnati, Ohio, on October 19, 1840. He was the grandson of Jeremiah Morrow, the ninth Governor of Ohio and a U.S. Senator. George Morrow's parents were farmers, and he remained home until enlisting with the 24th Ohio Infantry for the Civil War in 1861. He was wounded at the Battle of Perryville and was briefly taken as a prisoner of war. Due to failing health, he was discharged in July 1863.

Following his discharge, he moved to Minnesota. A few months later, he enrolled in the University of Michigan Law School, graduating in 1866. He became the editor of the Western Rural and later edited the Western Farmer. In 1876, Morrow accepted a position as professor at the Iowa Agricultural College and eventually rose to chair the department. In 1877, Morrow accepted an appointment as chair of the University of Illinois College of Agriculture. Morrow implemented the Rothamsted Plan at the university to determine ways to improve the quality of Illinois soil. The field became known as the Morrow Plots, and it is today recognized as a National Historic Landmark for its contributions to the history of American agriculture. He later became president of the Oklahoma Agricultural and Mechanical College.

Morrow married Sarah M. Gifford in Detroit, Michigan, in 1867. They had three surviving children: Minnie, Clarence, and Grace. Morrow died on 26 Mar 1900, at his home in Paxton, Illinois, and was buried in Mount Hope Cemetery in Urbana, Illinois.
