= Connect2 =

British walking and cycle route project

Connect2 was a five-year project run by Sustrans beginning in 2006 to develop new walking and cycle routes in 79 communities around the UK.

== Project ==
Connect2 was a five-year project run by Sustrans. It involves the creation of new cycle and walking routes, bridges and other facilities in 79 locations around the UK. It aims to create new networks of local paths, improve cycling and walking access and to connect local areas.

Sustrans launched the 'Connect2' project in August 2006 in a successful bid to win £50 million from the Big Lottery's 'Living Landmarks; The People's Millions' competition. It was one of four shortlisted projects competing in a public vote for the grant and Connect2 was announced as the winning project on 12 December 2007.

It is estimated that Connect2 will pass within half a mile of: 3,280,000 people; 1,426,000 households; 1,355 schools; 500,000 pupils; and 57 of the most deprived boroughs in the UK. With the aim to give the benefits of: 61.5 million trips a year are expected to be made on the routes; 79,500 tonnes of CO_{2} could potentially be saved per annum if each of the journeys had replaced a car trip; £135 million of funding in total will be generated by Connect2; and 116 local authorities are working to deliver Connect2.

== Schemes ==
There are 79 Connect2 projects around the UK and distributed throughout the regions. The tables below were compiled from a complete list of Connect2 projects available on the OpenStreetMap wiki under a Creative Commons Attribution-ShareAlike 2.0 license.

=== East of England ===
Scheme	County	Note
Norwich - connections to Whitlingham Country Park	Norfolk	
Royston railway crossing	Hertfordshire	
St. Neots - a River Great Ouse bridge	Huntingdonshire	
Cambridge to Wicken Fen (Wicken Fen Vision Spine Route) (The Lodes Way)	Cambridgeshire	Under construction. Substantially complete 2010. Further bridge work to 2013.
Watton and Griston link	Norfolk	
Cheshunt, crossing the A10 to reach the Lee	Hertfordshire	

=== East Midlands ===
Scheme	County	Note
Carlton-le-Moorland and Bassingham Link		
Holdingham and Sleaford over the A17 road	Lincolnshire	Completed 2010
Links through Watermead Park	Leicestershire	
Northampton - Briar Hill and Upton Park, River Wellingborough, Rushden, Higham Ferrers.		

=== London ===
Scheme	County	Note
Islington Walking and Cycling Routes		
Croydon Park links		
Paddington - Westbourne railway bridge and links		
South Bermondsey - disused rail bridge links		
Bethnal Green and new bridge over Regents		
Havering - Ingrebourne Valley links		

=== North East England ===
Scheme	County	Note
Bedlington and Cramlington Connection		
Ingleby Barwick, Yarm, Eaglescliffe and Blyth Ferry		
Durham- Belmont to Newton Hall over Belmont		

=== Northern Ireland ===
Scheme	County	Note
Derry - greenway and cycle path		Peace Bridge
Strabane - River Mourne Bridge and links		
Dungannon Park Connections		
Ballymoney Railway Bridge and links		
Omagh - riverside path and new bridges		
Three Mile Water greenway		

=== North West England ===
Scheme	County	Note
Nantwich to Crewe along the A530 corridor		
Marple and Stockport, Goyt Valley connection		
Huyton - The Statt Moers Park Links & Rochdale Canal Towpath Connections		
Carlisle - Kingmoor and Currock		
Padiham, East Lancashire Loop		
Sale- Bridgewater Canal connections		
Chester connections over the Dee		
Northwich - Riversdale Swingbridge		
Everton Park and the Mersey		
Bury - the Woolfold Gap		
Maryport Station Links		

=== Scotland ===
Scheme	County	Note
Glasgow - completing the Bridge to Nowhere		
Dumfries - connecting two railway paths		
Perth to Scone - River Tay Bridge		
Hamilton, Chatelherault, Larkhall links		

=== South East England ===
Scheme	County	Note
Links to the north Kent coast		
Dartford Riverside		
Hastings and Bexhill coastal connections		
Southampton - Itchen Riverside Path		
Shoreham - harbour crossing		
New Forest - Common Connections		
Banbury, Oxford Canal links		

=== South West England ===
Scheme	County	Note
Bath, Two Tunnels	Somerset	
Bristol - Ashton Park, Long Ashton	Somerset	
Newton Abbot and Kingsteignton	Devon	
Ottery St Mary over the river to school	Devon	
Weymouth to Portland - Olympic connections	Dorset	
Bournemouth and Hurn	Dorset	
Connecting Salisbury, Alderbury and Wilton	Wiltshire	

=== Wales ===
Scheme	County	Note
Tintern - connection over the River Wye	Monmouthshire	Dropped in 2011 after problems obtaining planning permission.
Monmouth - local connections	Monmouthshire	
Merthyr Tydfil- Trevithick Trail to town centre link	Glamorgan	
Treforest - University links and connections	Glamorgan	
Port Talbot to Cwmafan and the Forest Park	Glamorgan	
Rhyl bridge at Foryd Harbour, River Clwyd	Flintshire	
Cardiff: Pont y Werin	Glamorgan	
Newport to Caerleon	Monmouthshire	
Carmarthen to Johnston riverside links	Carmarthenshire	
Clydach, Afon Tawe Bridge	Glamorgan	

=== West Midlands ===
Scheme	County	Note
Worcester - a Severn Bridge at Diglis Lock	Worcs.	
Shrewsbury - The Severnside Gap		
Birmingham - Sutton Coldfield, and the Plants Brook Route		
Kenilworth to Berkswell Greenway and Rugby		
Leicester Road Viaduct		
Hereford - The Rotherwas Sewage Bridge	Herefordshire	

=== Yorkshire ===
Scheme	County	Note
Bradford Living Streets – Manchester Road Bridge	Yorkshire	
Bridlington to Flamborough Head Coastal	Yorkshire	
Scunthorpe Ridgeway connections	Yorkshire	
Killamarsh – Halfway Tram Terminus, Rother	Yorkshire	
Harrogate, Ripley and the Dales	Yorkshire	
Brompton-on-Swale – a bridge across the river	Yorkshire	
