= Harry Godwin =

English botanist and ecologist (1901–1985)

- Born: 9 May 1901
- Died: 12 August 1985 (aged 84)
- Education: University of Cambridge
- Known for: Peat Archives
- Awards: Prestwich Medal (1951); Linnean Medal (1966); Albrecht-Penck-Medaille (1982); Fellow of the Royal Society
- Scientific career
- Notable students: Camilla Dickson, Nick Shackleton

Sir Harry Godwin, FRS (9 May 1901 – 12 August 1985) was a prominent English botanist and ecologist of the 20th century. He is considered to be an influential peatland scientist, who coined the phrase "peat archives" in 1981. He had a long association with Clare College, Cambridge.

== Early life ==
Godwin was born in Yorkshire and soon after moved to Long Eaton, Derbyshire. He had a successful school career at Long Eaton County Secondary School and won a scholarship to Clare College, Cambridge, in 1918, gaining his PhD in 1926. He was to be closely involved with Clare College for the rest of his life. It was at this time that he first made friends with the ecologist Sir Arthur Tansley who was to be an important influence on Godwin for many years.

== Work ==
In the early 1930s Harry and his wife Margaret were "dynamic botanists" who, together with the archaeologist Grahame Clark, led a small group of young academics at the University of Cambridge which aimed to gain a deeper understanding of the environment of past societies by integrating archaeological knowledge with new scientific techniques in geology and plant sciences, instead of the traditional archaeologists' study of artefacts in isolation.

His work began in botany and plant physiology, and he continued this throughout his career, eventually becoming Professor of Botany (1960–1967). However his most notable work was in the development of the science of ecology, which was, at the start of his career, in its infancy. He was an early exponent of the study of ecological successions, such as in the fen wetlands at Wicken Fen in Cambridgeshire, where he established the Godwin Plots which can be still seen there today. He was the founder and first director of the Subdepartment of Quaternary Research at the University of Cambridge in 1948, where he supervised pioneering work on the new technique of radiocarbon dating.

Harry Godwin was a stimulating teacher and researcher. His students include many famous practitioners including Richard West, Sir Nick Shackleton, Joakim Donner and many others.

=== Peat archives ===
Authors Rydin and Jeglum in Biology of Habitats described the concept of peat archives, a phrase coined by Godwin in 1981.

"In a peat profile there is a fossilized record of changes over time in the vegetation, pollen, spores, animals (from microscopic to the giant elk), and archaeological remains that have been deposited in place, as well as pollen, spores and particles brought in by wind and weather. These remains are collectively termed the peat archives."

== Notable students and trainees ==
- Camilla Dickson
- Nicholas Shackleton
