= Godwin Plots =

Ecological experiments in Cambridgeshire, England

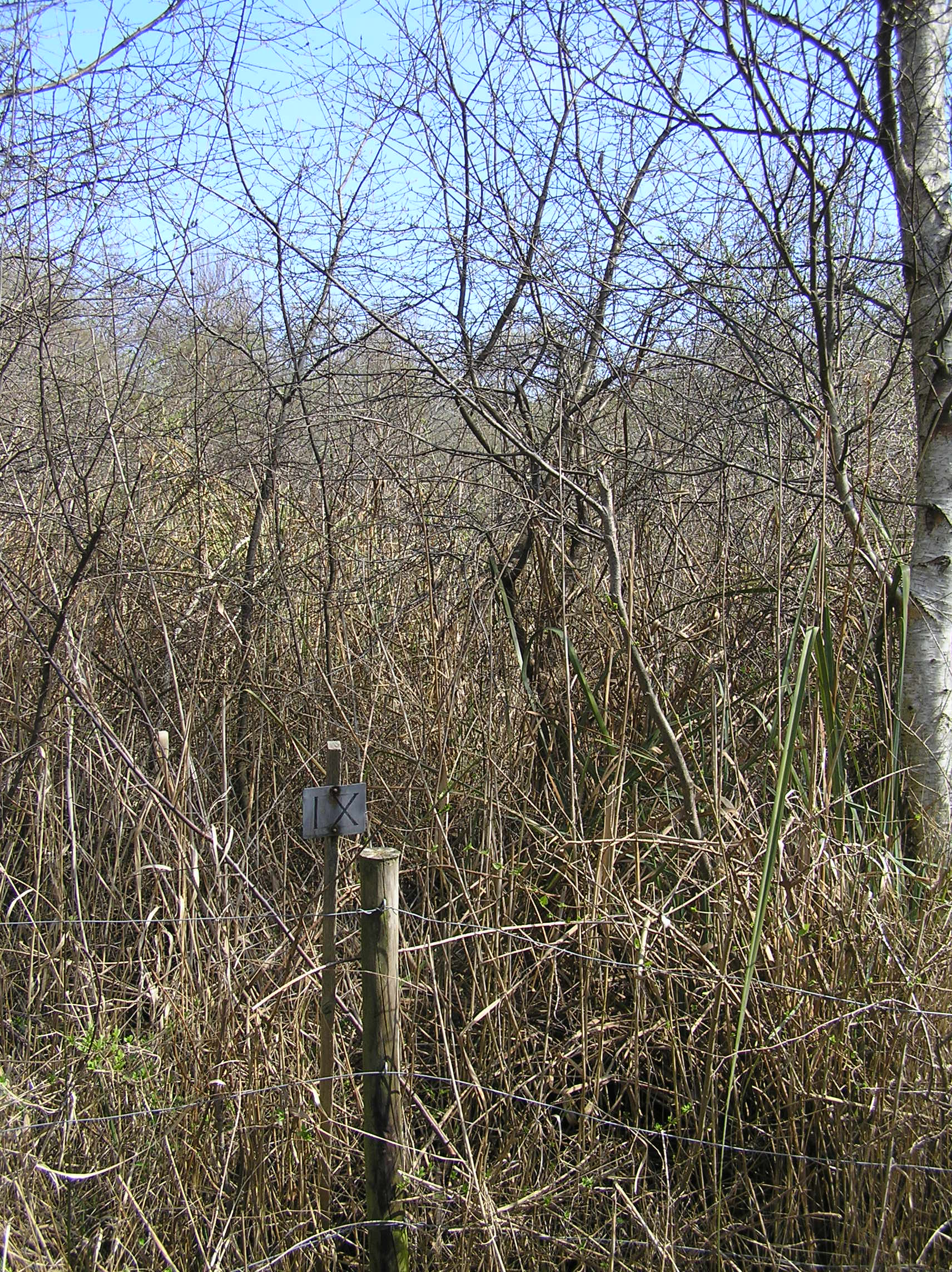
This is the plot which is never cut

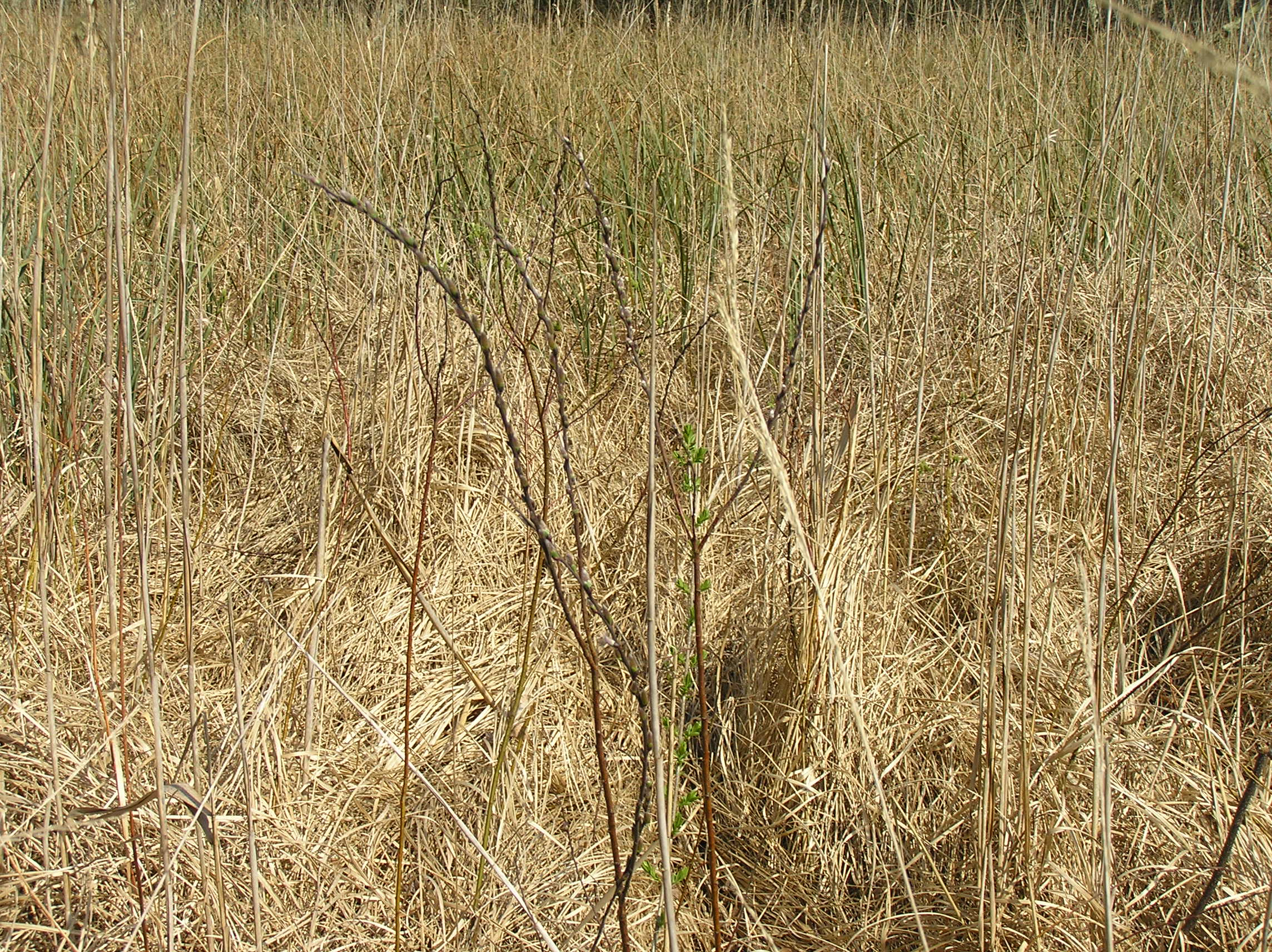
This plot is cut every three years

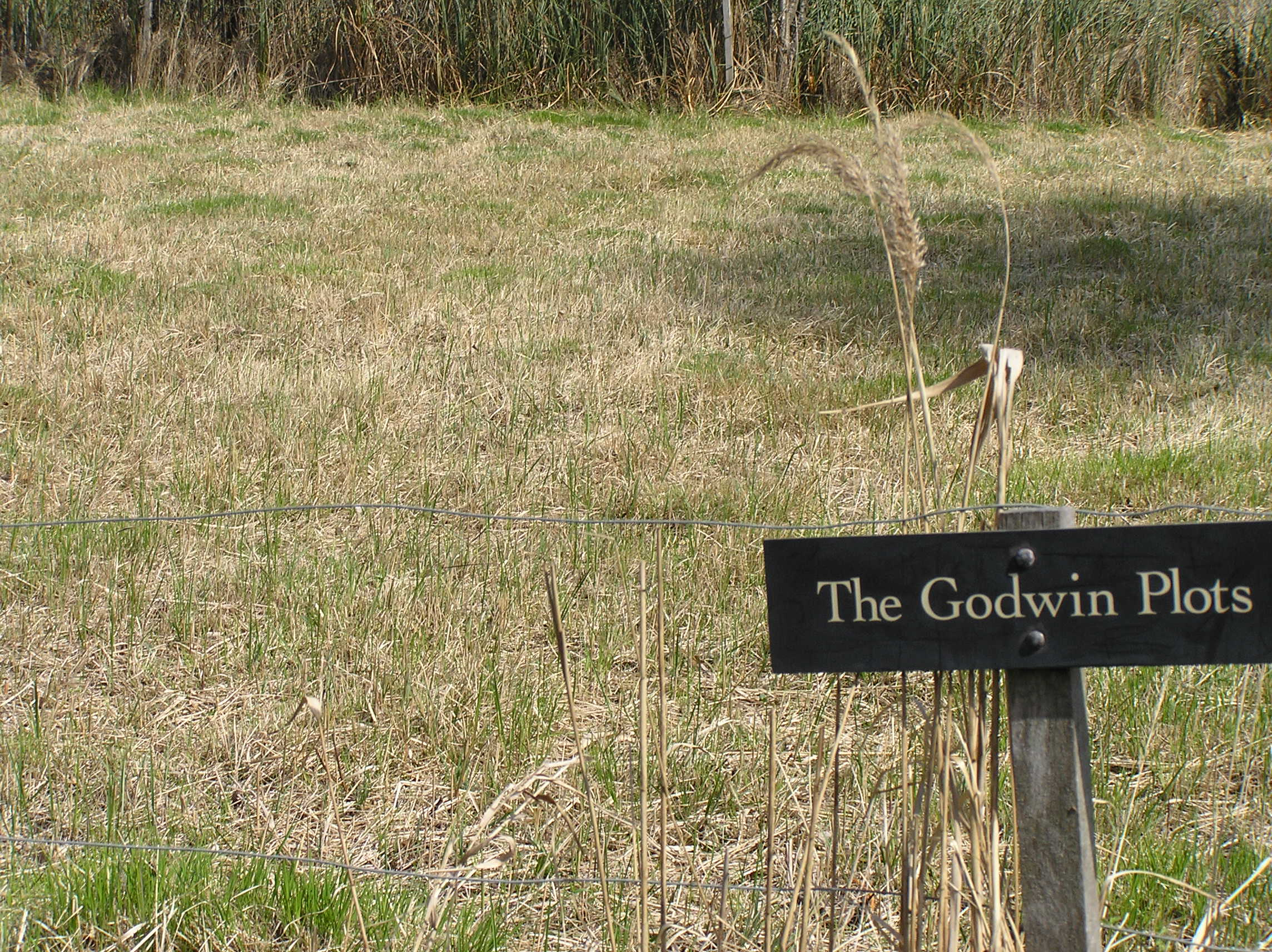
This plot is cut annually

The Godwin Plots are one of the world's longest running science experiments. They can be found at Wicken Fen nature reserve, Cambridgeshire, England.

Five experimental areas of vegetation were established in the 1927 by Prof. Sir Harry Godwin. The first plot is never cut. The second is cut every four years, the next every three years and so on. Godwin completed his experiment in 1940, and the plots were left uncut, but the same plots were restored in 1954, and have been managed in accordance with Godwin's original methodology since that time.

The cutting is undertaken in November/December every year. This management has, over many years, produced different vegetation patterns. Godwin used the experiment to demonstrate that management alone can change plant communities - an idea which is almost universally accepted today, but was quite radical in the early 20th century. Because of this work, the Plots, or Wicken Fen generally, are sometimes referred to as 'The birthplace of modern ecology'.

== See also ==
- Long-term experiment
