= Benjamin Minge Duggar =

American plant physiologist (1872–1956)

- Born: September 1, 1872
- Died: September 10, 1956 (aged 84)
- Education: Harvard University, Cornell University
- Occupation: Botanist, phytopathologist
- Employer: Cornell University; United States Department of Agriculture; University of Missouri; Washington University in St. Louis

Benjamin Minge Duggar (September 1, 1872 – September 10, 1956) was an American plant physiologist best remembered for his discovery of chlortetracycline (Aureomycin), the first of the tetracycline antibiotics.

== Biography ==
Benjamin Minge Duggar was born at Gallion, Hale County, Alabama on September 1, 1872. He studied at several Southern schools, including the University of Alabama (1887-1889), Mississippi A & M College (B.S., 1891), and Alabama Polytechnic Institute (M.S., 1892); at Harvard and Cornell (Ph.D., 1898) and in Europe.

As a specialist in botany, he held various positions in experiment stations and colleges until 1901, when he was appointed physiologist in the Bureau of Plant Industry, United States Department of Agriculture. He was professor of botany at the University of Missouri from 1902 to 1907 and spent a sabbatical at institutions in Germany, Italy, and France (1905-1906).

From 1907 to 1912 Duggar held the chair of plant physiology at Cornell University. In 1912 he became a research professor of plant physiology at Washington University in St. Louis, working with the Missouri Botanical Garden in St. Louis. From 1917 to 1919, he was acting professor of biological chemistry at the Washington University School of Medicine. In 1927 he left Washington University to become professor of botany at the University of Wisconsin.

Duggar published many articles and books on a wide range of topics including mycology, mushroom growing, and plant physiology and pathology. He wrote extensively on plant diseases including Ravenelia, Rhizoctonia, cotton root rot disease, crown gall, and particularly tobacco mosaic virus. His comprehensive American textbook on plant pathology Fungous Diseases of Plants (1909') became a standard text on the topic. It was followed by the textbook Plant Physiology (1911)

After becoming an Emeritus Professor, he continued to carry out research. One project was with Lederle Laboratories, part of American Cyanamid, looking for a treatment for malaria based on a species of Rhododendron which he found at the New York Botanical Gardens. Another project resulted in the discovery of Streptomyces aureus n. sp. a fungus producing a strong antibiotic. As a result of his work on chlortetracycline (Aureomycin), the first of the tetracycline antibiotics, he personally met with both the Pope and the Mikado of Japan.

Duggar was vice president of the Botanical Society of America in 1912 and 1914 and president in 1923. He also served as president of the American Society of Plant Physiologists in 1947.

Duggar died on September 10, 1956, in New Haven, Connecticut.

== See also ==
- Tetracycline
