= Camilla Dickson =

English archaeobotanist

- Born: Camilla Lambert; December 4, 1932
- Died: May 18, 1998 (aged 65)
- Known for: Archaeobotany of Scottish archaeological sites

Academic work
- Discipline: Archaeobotany

Camilla Ada Dickson (née Lambert; 4 December 1932 – 18 May 1998) was an archaeobotanist specialising in the analysis of archaeological plant material from Scotland.

== Early life and training ==
Camilla Dickson, née Lambert, was born on 4 December 1932 in Histon. In the 1950s, despite having no formal scientific or archaeological qualifications, she began working as a technician in Cambridge University's Botany School, in the Sub-Department of Quaternary Research, where she worked with botanist Sir Harry Godwin on the identification of pollen and seeds from archaeological sites.

== Career ==
Dickson's work in the Sub-Department of Quaternary Research included overseeing the laboratories as well as maintaining their reference collections of botanical material; by the early 1960s, she was contributing to the Sub-Department's publications and in 1963 she published her first article as lead author, on the Late Pleistocene flora and faunal remains found at an excavation in Cambridge. In 1964, she married fellow-archaeobotanist James Dickson, later a professor at Glasgow University, and thereafter the couple worked together on archaeobotanical projects in Scotland, including at Skara Brae on Orkney, where Camilla Dickson was responsible for identifying North American driftwood used as firewood, and Bearsden Roman Fort, where they investigated the Roman military diet based on sewage found in the fort's ditch. In order to prove that the large amount of bran found in the sewage originated from bread eaten by the soldiers, Dickson experimented by eating only wholemeal bread for several days and then comparing her excreta to the archaeological material. Dickson also identified the medicinal plants grown at and imported to Paisley Abbey in the fifteenth century by analysing material from the abbey's drains.

== Death and legacy ==
Dickson died on 18 May 1998, while working on her first book, Plants & People in Ancient Scotland; the book was completed by her husband James and published in 2000. Reviewers commented that "The value of this book can be demonstrated by the advances in knowledge over the past 30 years summarized in the concluding chapter of the chronological narrative. The authors have been at the forefront of this research and this book serves as a testament to their contribution. Camilla Dickson, who died in 1998, inspired and helped many people to develop interests in the archaeobotany of Scotland and this book will continue to do so in the future." and "Camilla Dickson's passing was a sad day for archaeobotany in general, let alone in Scotland. Archaeologists, palaeoecologists and the desired 'general public' are fortunate that her husband and co-worker mustered the fortitude to bring this volume to fruition."

An obituary in The Herald called Dickson "one of the leading scientists in the comparatively new field of archaeobotany".

== Selected publications ==
- B.A. Knights, Camilla A. Dickson, J.H. Dickson, D.J. Breeze, "Evidence concerning the Roman military diet at Bearsden, Scotland, in the 2nd Century AD", Journal of Archaeological Science 10.2 (1983), pp.139-152. https://doi.org/10.1016/0305-4403(83)90048-1
- C. Dickson, "Food, medicinal and other plants from the 15th century drains of Paisley Abbey, Scotland". Vegetation History & Archaeobotany 5, pp.25–31 (1996). https://doi.org/10.1007/BF00189432
- Camilla Dickson & James Dickson, Plants & People in Ancient Scotland (Tempus, 2000).
