= Walk Wheel Cycle Trust =

British walking and cycling charity

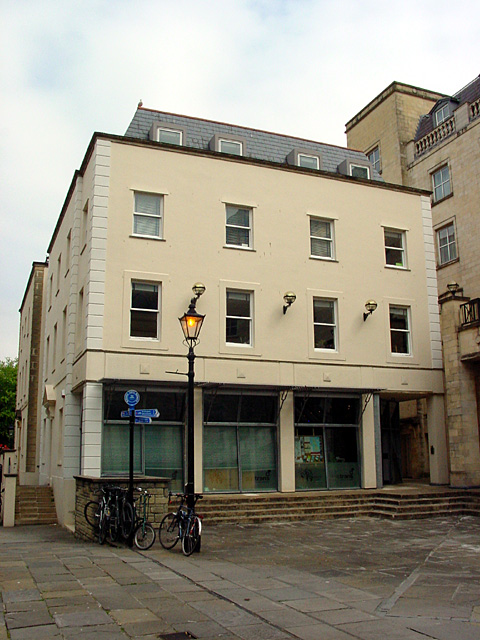
- Headquarters of Walk Wheel Cycle Trust in Bristol
- Predecessor: Cyclebag
- Formation: July 1977; 49 years ago
- Headquarters: Bristol, England
- Coordinates: 51.452°N 2.599°W
- Region served: United Kingdom
- Chair: Moray Macdonald
- Chief Executive: Xavier Brice
- Board of directors: Board of trustees (12 as of 2022)
- Budget: £46.0M (2018/2019)
- Revenue: £45.7M (2018/2019)
- Staff: 489 (2018/2019)
- Volunteers: 4,000 (2018/2019)
- Website: www.walkwheelcycletrust.org.uk
- Formerly called: Sustrans

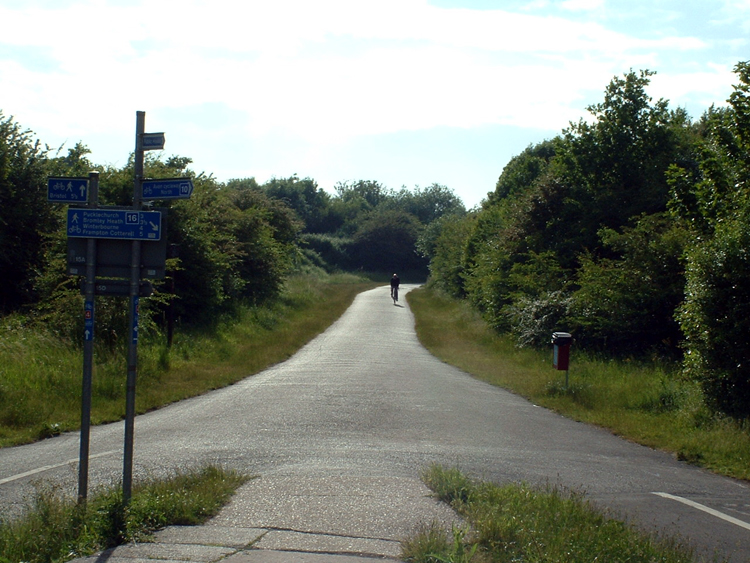
Sustrans' first route follows a disused railway through a green corridor in Bristol

Walk Wheel Cycle Trust is a British walking, wheeling and cycling charity, and the custodian of the National Cycle Network. Until 2025 it was called Sustrans (/ˈsustræns/ SUS-trans; a lexical blend of sustainable and transport),

Its flagship project is the National Cycle Network, which has created 12,763 miles (20,540 kilometres) of signed cycle routes throughout the United Kingdom, including 5,273 mi (8,486 km) of traffic-free paths. The rest of the network is on previously existing and mostly minor roads, in which motor traffic will be encountered.

The charity was founded in 1983, building on the earlier work of a group of cyclists and environmentalists in the Bristol area.

== History ==
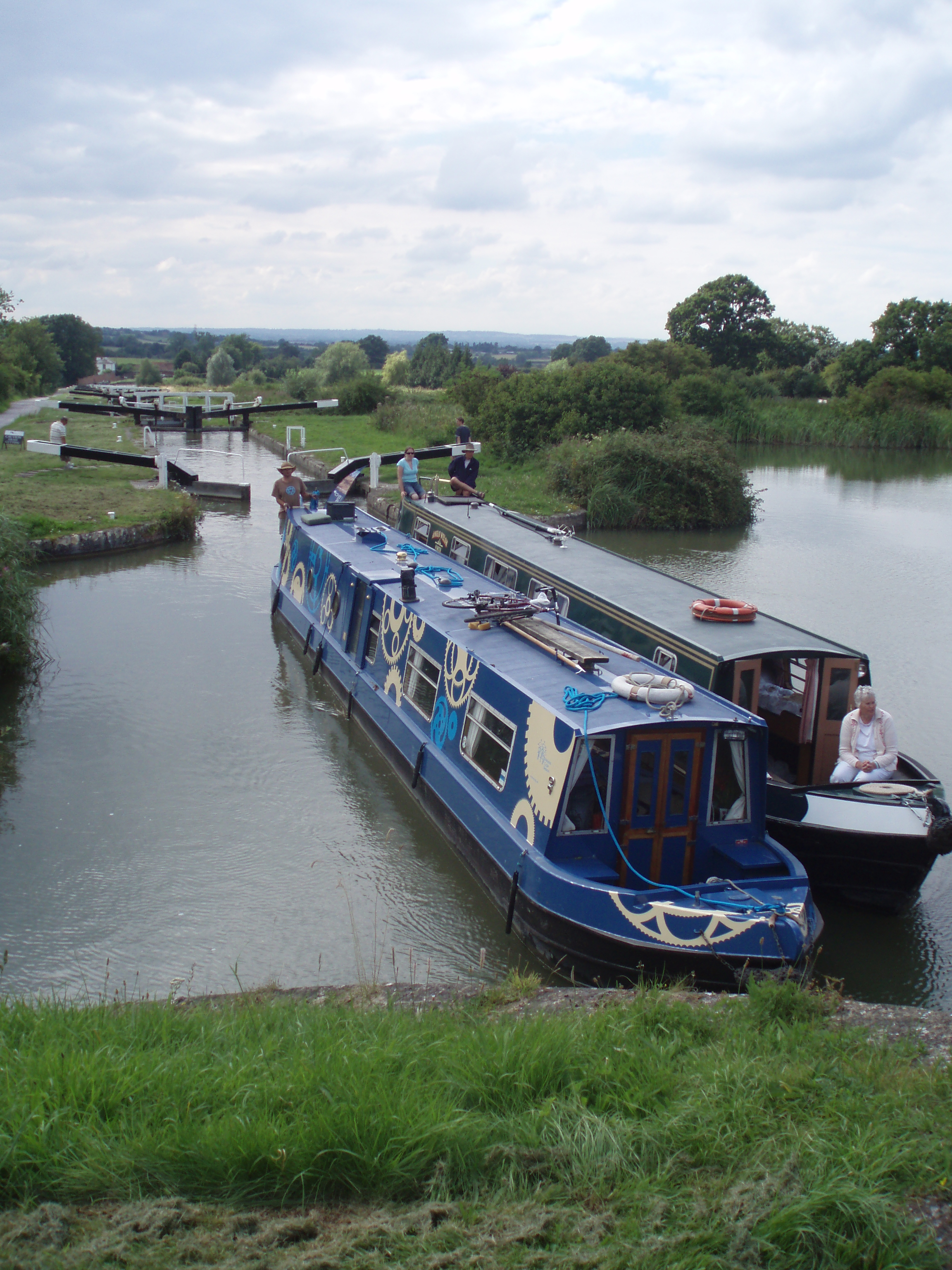
Canal boat decked in Sustrans logo

Sustrans was started in Bristol in July 1977 as Cyclebag by a group of cyclists and environmentalists, as a result of doubts about the desirability of dependence on the private car, following the 1973 oil crisis, and the almost total lack of specific provision for cyclists in most British cities, in contrast to some other European countries.

A decade earlier, the Beeching Axe closed many British railways that the government considered underused and too costly. One was the former Midland Railway line between central Bristol and Bath, which was closed in favour of the more direct, former Great Western Railway between the cities. Cyclebag, led by John Grimshaw, leased part of the old route and together with many volunteers and the help of Avon County Council (Bristol and Bath were then part of the County of Avon) turned it into its first route, the Bristol & Bath Railway Path.

In the early 1980s, when unemployment rose, the organisation took advantage of government schemes to provide temporary employment to build similar "green routes". British Waterways and Cyclebag collaborated to improve towpaths along some canals, which resulted in increased use of the towpaths, especially by cyclists.

In 1983, the charity Sustrans was founded. It had 11 directors (trustees, members, and board members of the charity) chosen by the existing board. The executive board was composed of the chief executive, John Grimshaw, and one of the two company secretaries.

By the early 1990s, Sustrans had a growing number of supporters, and the network of national routes was emerging. In 1995, it was granted £43.5 million from the Millennium Lottery Fund to extend the National Cycle Network to smaller towns and rural areas, as well as launch the "Safe Routes to Schools" project, based on earlier state projects in Denmark.

The five-year project, Connect2 was launched in 2006, and it aimed at improving local travel in 79 communities by creating new walking and cycling routes. In 2007, it received £50 million from the Big Lottery's 'Living Landmarks; The People's Millions' competition, following a public vote.

In 2015, Sustrans ran the Campaign for Safer Streets, which encouraged people to write to Prime Minister David Cameron to encourage him to commit to funding safer walking and cycling routes to schools.

In October 2015, Sustrans released its first Bike Life report. It was a survey of residents in seven UK cities, undertaken in conjunction with local councils and transport authorities, attempting to assess the current state of cycling in the UK. It covered areas such as safety, provision of cycling infrastructure and people's attitudes towards cycling.

In Scotland, the charity has established partnership teams, embedding officers in local councils as well as NHS Scotland, the Scottish Environment Protection Agency, Scottish Natural Heritage, and Transport for Edinburgh.

In 2020–2021, Sustrans' executive team had a combined payroll of £715,000, with its CEO receiving over £110,000.

The name of the charity changed from Sustrans to Walk Wheel Cycle Trust in September 2025.

== Funding ==
The National Cycle Network was the first project to receive Millennium Commission funding in 1995. Sustrans has many sources of funding, and in the 2004/05 financial year, its income was £23.6 million: £2.1 million from supporters' donations, £8.5 million from the Department for Transport and a further £2.5 million from the National Opportunities Fund specifically for the Safe Routes projects. Additional funding comes from charitable grants and trusts, local government, and the sales of maps and books. In Scotland in 2020, in response to the COVID-19 pandemic, £30 million of Spaces for People funding was granted to Sustrans by the Scottish Government to assist local authorities and statutory bodies in Scotland to provide safe walking and cycling infrastructure.

== National Cycle Network ==
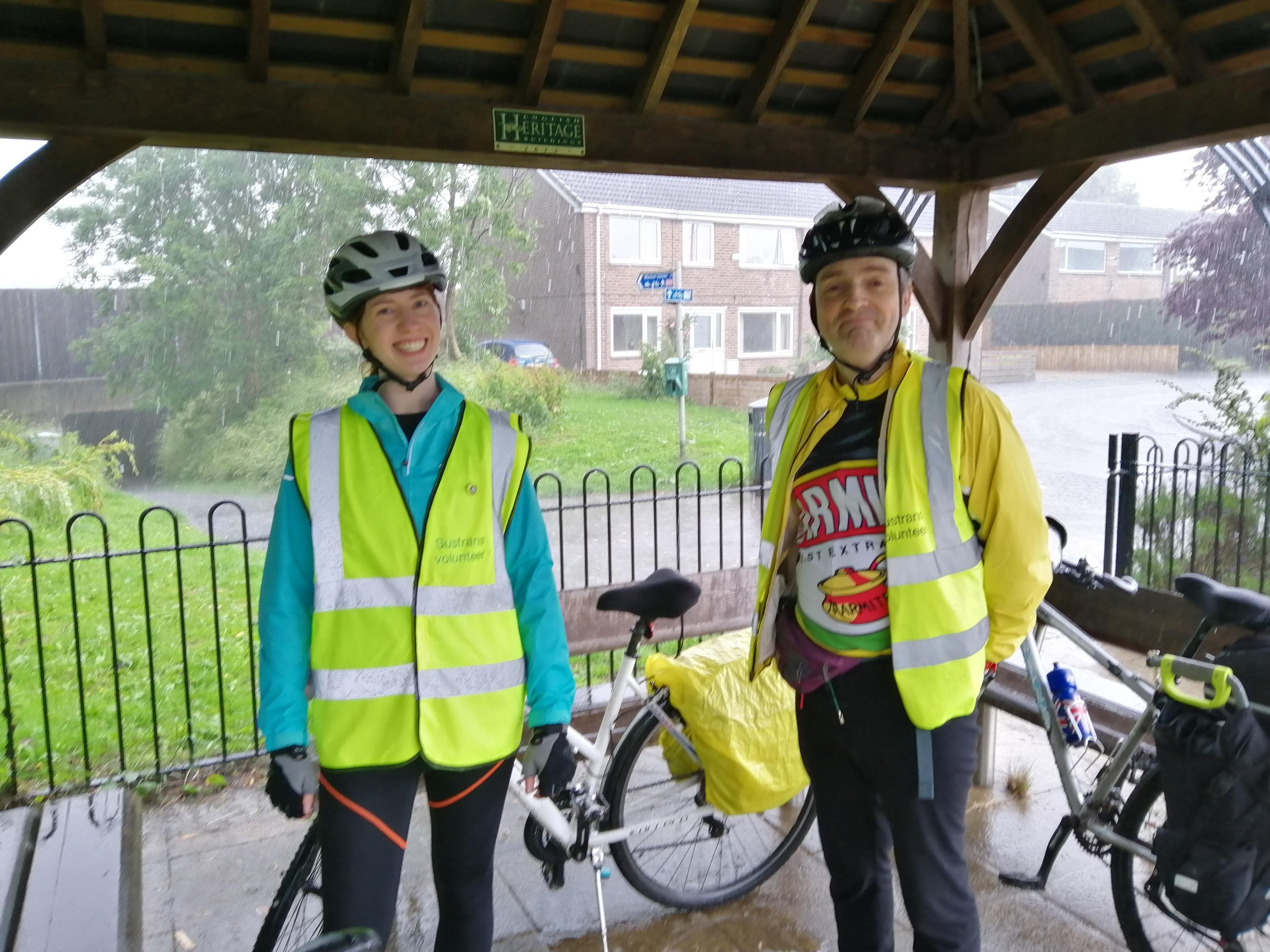
Sustrans volunteers in Wetherby, West Yorkshire

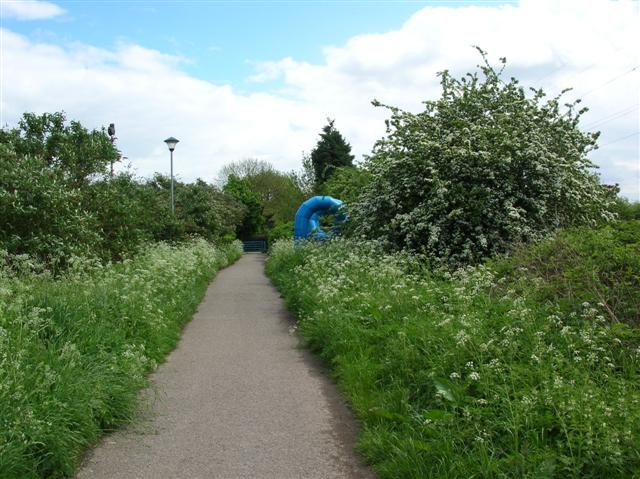
Sustrans Route 66 behind the Derwent Arms, Osbaldwick, York

The National Cycle Network was officially opened in June 2000, when 5,000 mi (8,000 km) had been completed, although some routes had been open for over a decade. In 2005 the network reached 10,000 mi (16,000 km). In urban areas, almost 20% of the network is free from motor traffic, though these sections can account for up to 80% of use. The more rural parts of the network see less motor traffic and are used primarily for leisure cycling.

Sustrans estimated that in 2005, the network carried 232,000,000 journeys by all classes of non-motorized users. In 2010, the figure had risen to over 420,000,000 journeys. The data collected by Sustrans to compile monitoring reports, from traffic counters and user surveys, showed that National Cycle Network usage is predominantly urban and on traffic-free sections. Furthermore, surveys show that only 35% of usage on urban sections of the NCN is for leisure purposes.

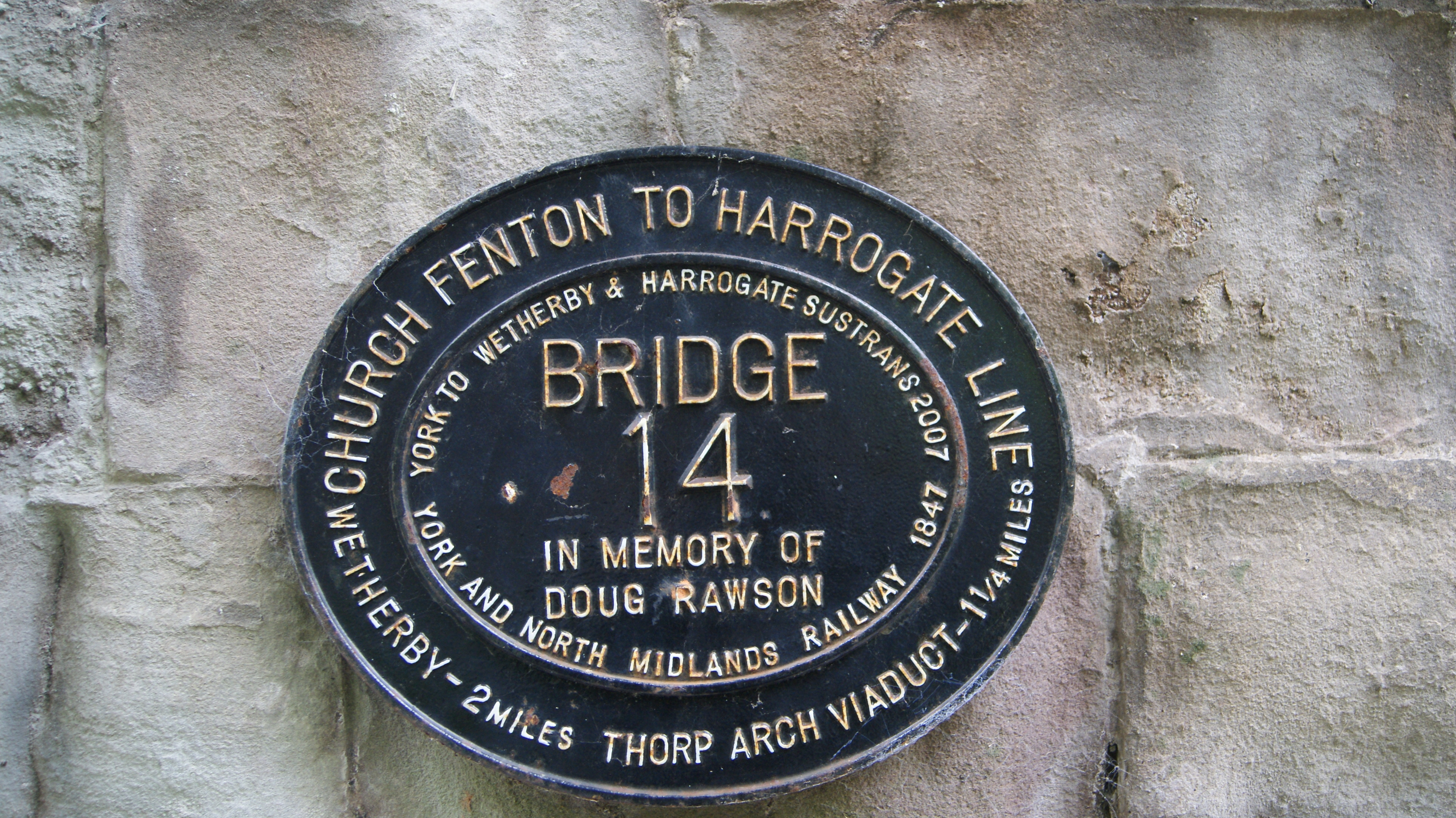
Sustrans plaque near Wetherby, West Yorkshire

In 2018, Sustrans published the "National Cycle Network Review: Paths for Everyone" report which reviewed the quality and usage of the Network and set out a vision for its future. It estimated that in 2017–2018, 4.4 million users carried out 786 million cycling and walking trips on the Network.

== Criticism ==
Sustrans have occasionally been criticised by other cycling organisations and activists over allegedly giving approval to cycle facilities regarded by critics as inadequate or dangerous, allowing local councils and similar bodies to reject criticism by pointing out that Sustrans have approved of the design being questioned. In 2013, for example, the Cycling Embassy of Great Britain criticised Sustrans for the extensive use of "shared use" provision—in which cycle routes are placed on pavements and footpaths without separation from pedestrians—in designs that Sustrans prepared for London. In 2016, the University of the West of England's Centre for Transport and Society identified shared use designs, and in particular Sustrans Design Guidance which encouraged such designs, because shared-use paths can offer a source of conflict between pedestrians and cyclists. This is a cause for frustration among some campaigning for better cycling infrastructure provision.

== See also ==
- Active Travel England, related Government body
