= John Grimshaw (cyclist) =

John Grimshaw CBE (born 1945) is a voice for cyclists in the UK.

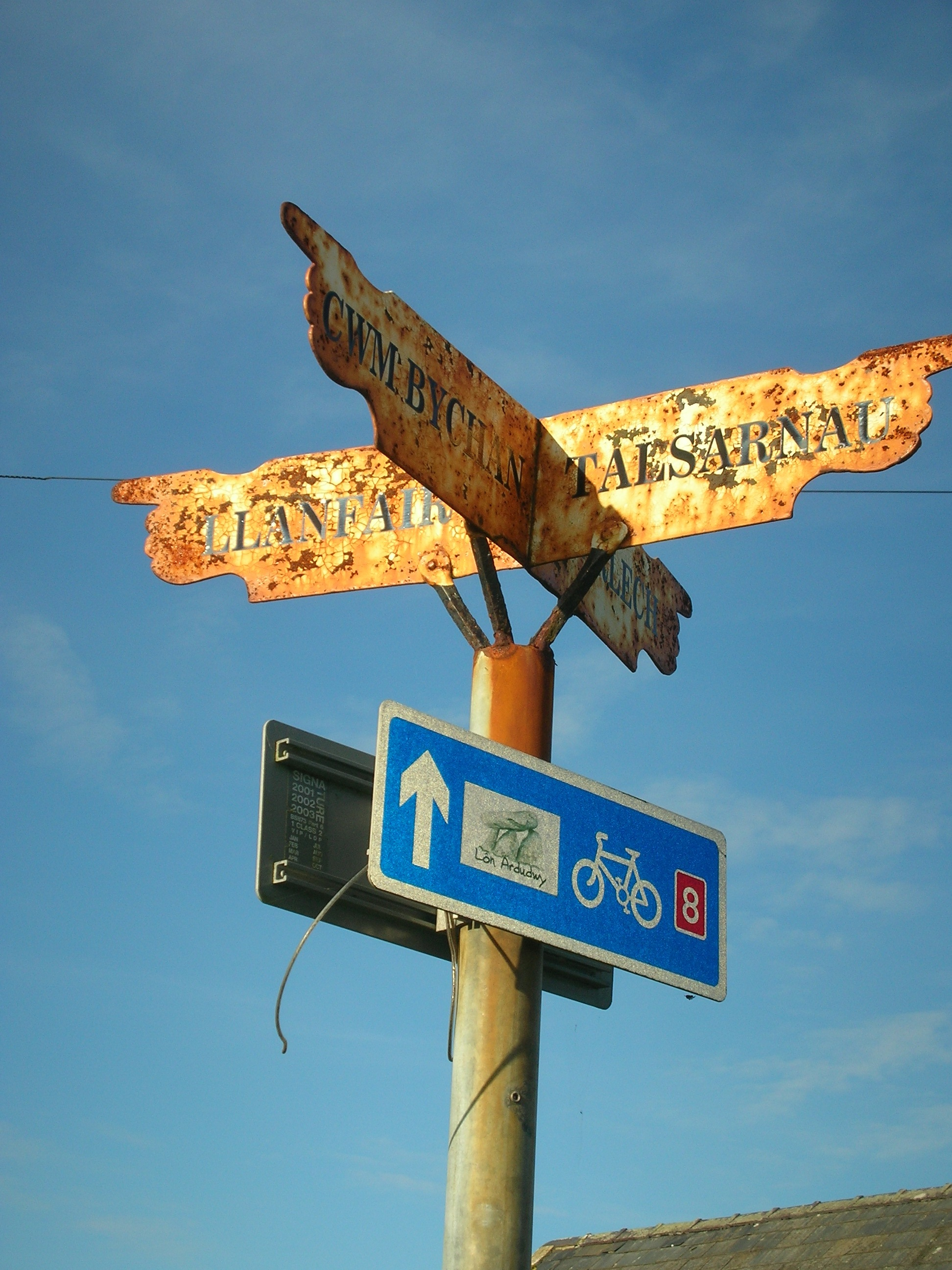
Route 8 sign near Harlech, North Wales

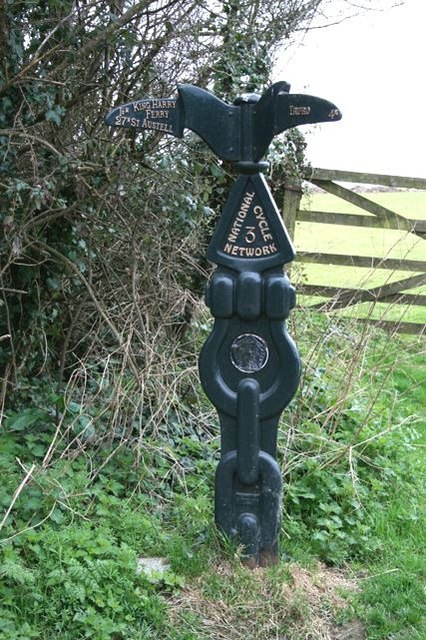
National Cycle Network signpost near Penelewey

Grimshaw read Engineering and Architecture at Gonville and Caius College, Cambridge.

Sustrans, run by Grimshaw, started the National Cycle Network. The signposts are a cycle with a number outlined in red. Also, on the routes, there is usually a cast-iron signpost. Grimshaw has a signpost in his front garden as a reminder of his work.

After 30 years with Sustrans, Grimshaw decided to step down from the role of Chief Executive, wanting to pursue other opportunities.

After stepping down, Grimshaw remained active advising and surveying potential new cycle routes for Cycling England before its abolition in 2011.

== Honours ==
- Honorary Master of Science (MSc) from the University of Bristol (2007)
- Appointed a CBE in the Queen's Birthday Honours, for services to the development of the national cycle network. (2008)
