= Morrow Plots =

- Morrow Plots, University of Illinois
- U.S. National Register of Historic Places
- U.S. National Historic Landmark
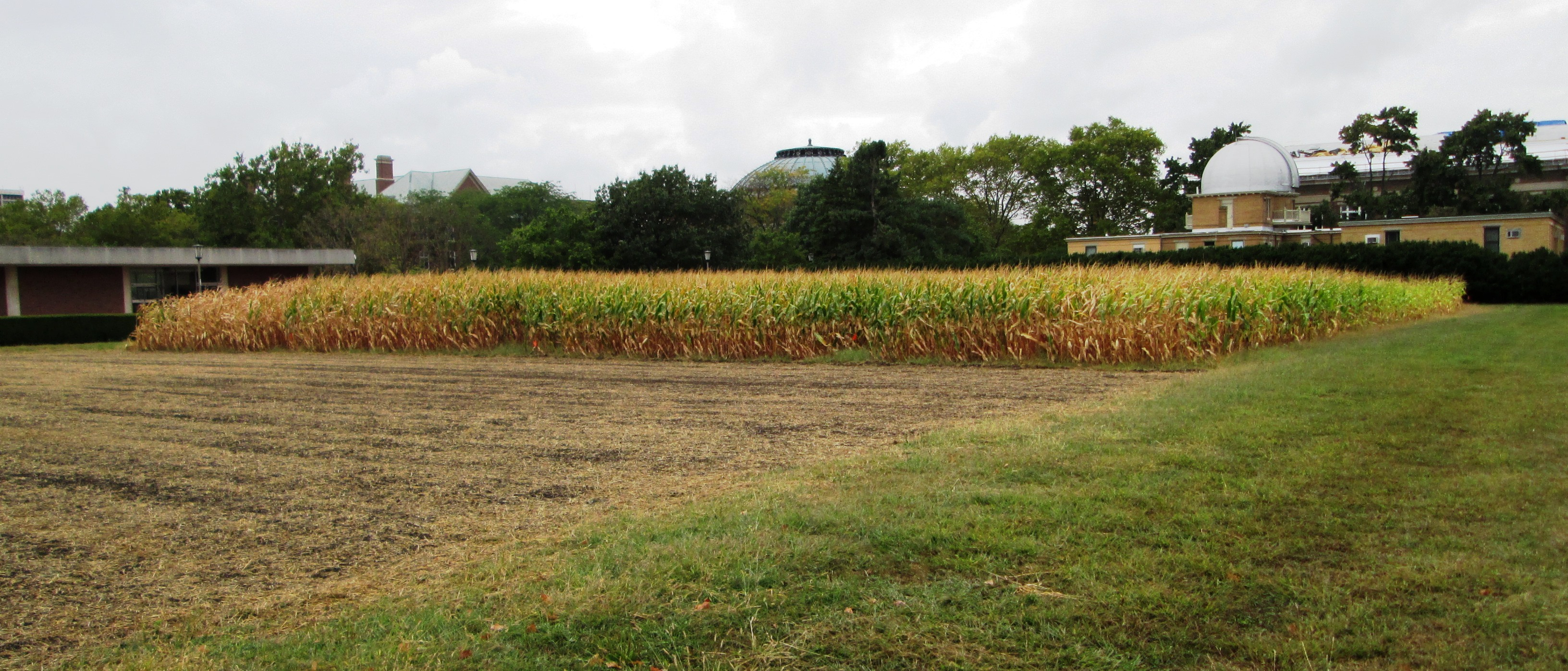
- (2013)
- Location: University of Illinois Urbana-Champaign
- Coordinates: 40°6′16.01″N 88°13′32.95″W
- Area: 0.8 acres (0.32 ha)
- Built: 1876
- NRHP reference No.: 68000024

Significant dates
- Added to NRHP: May 23, 1968
- Designated NHL: May 23, 1968

The Morrow Plots is an experimental agricultural field at the University of Illinois Urbana-Champaign. Named for Professor George E. Morrow, it is the oldest such field in the United States and the second oldest in the world. It was established in 1876 as the first experimental corn field at an American college and continues to be used today, although with three half-acre plots, instead of the original ten . The site was designated a National Historic Landmark on May 23, 1968. The fields are managed by the College of Agricultural, Consumer, and Environmental Sciences.

== Description ==
The Morrow Plots occupy a central position on the campus of the University of Illinois Urbana-Champaign (UIUC), between the Main Quad and the South Quad. They are bounded on the south by West Gregory Drive, the north by the Observatory, the east by the Woese Institute for Genomic Biology, and the west by the Undergraduate Library. The plots currently consist of three small fields, each one-fifth of an acre in size. The northernmost plot has been continuously planted in maize (corn) since 1876. The middle plot was originally planted in a rotation of corn and oats, with the oats replaced by soybeans in 1968. The southern plot was originally planted in a rotation of two years of corn, one year of oats, and three years clover; this was replaced in 1901 by a rotation of corn, oats, and clover, and in 1953 by corn, oats, and alfalfa.

It is popularly believed that the University constructed its Undergraduate Library to the west of the Plots with three stories underground, so that the library would not block the sun from the Morrow Plots, a myth immortalized in a Novelty song by the university’s infamous all-male acapella group, The Other Guys. However, the University master plan at the time called for a large open plaza on that end of campus, which was an equally important reason the library was built underground.

== History ==
The Morrow Plots were begun in 1876 by Professor Manly Miles, who established three half-acre fields with different crop schemes. These were expanded to ten plots in 1879 by George E. Morrow. At first, record keeping was not of the highest caliber, but by the turn of the 20th century it was clear that crop rotation was a useful component in preventing the depletion of soil quality. In 1895, the two northernmost plots were retired to accommodate the construction of an observatory, which still stands today. By the early 20th century, the number of remaining plots had been reduced to three, having been seeded to grass and later replaced by additional university facilities.

The results of the experiments which were carried out at the Morrow Plots showed that "soil quality is a vital component of agricultural productivity", and that the "use of science and technology ... increased crop productivity over four-fold."

== Gallery ==
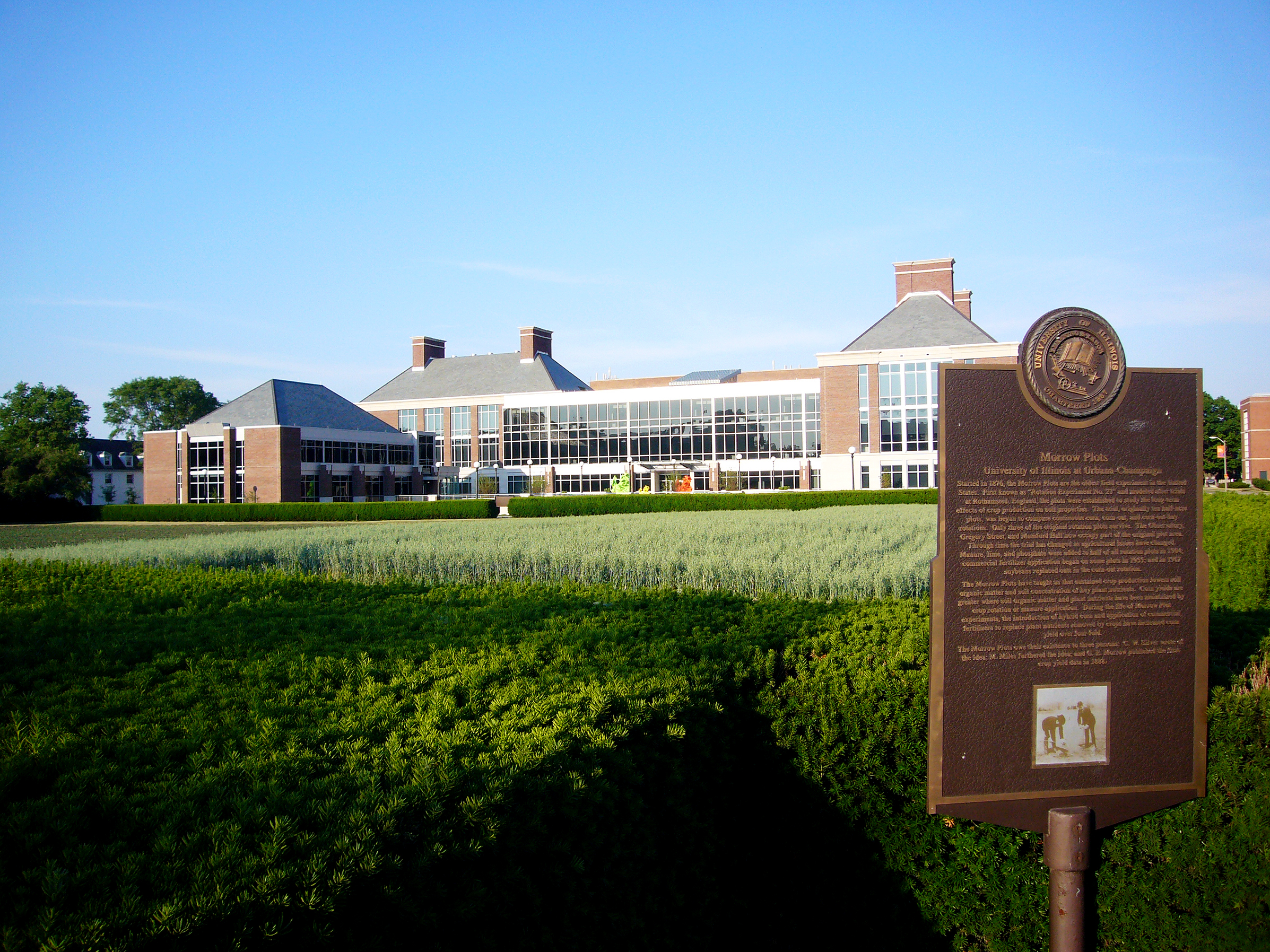
Looking north east toward Carl R. Woese Institute for Genomic Biology

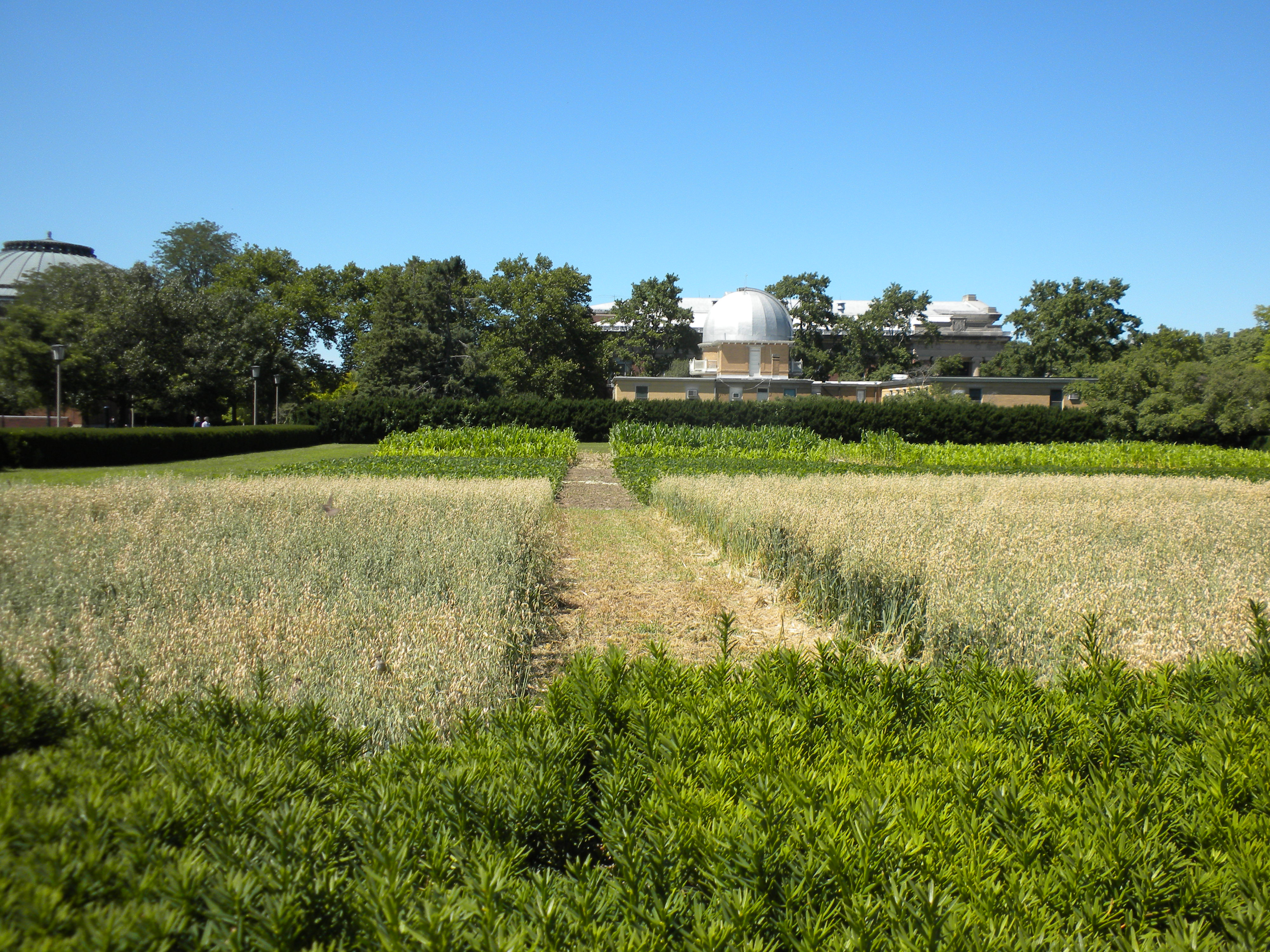
Looking north toward the Astronomical Observatory

== See also ==
- Long-term experiment
- List of National Historic Landmarks in Illinois
