= Sanborn Field =

- Sanborn Field and Soil Erosion Plots
- U.S. National Register of Historic Places
- U.S. National Historic Landmark
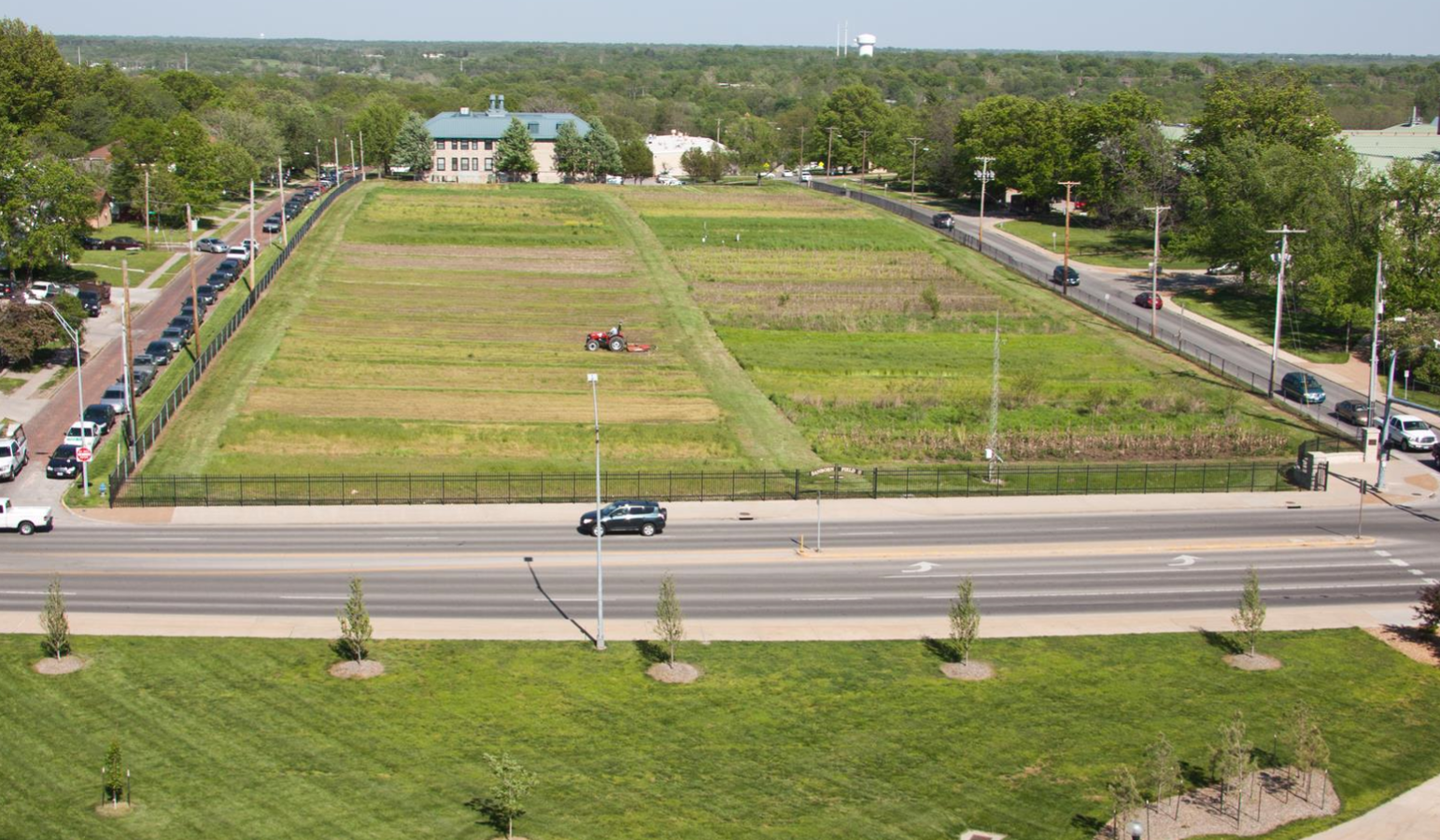
- View of Sanborn Field from the adjacent Bond Life Sciences Center on the University of Missouri campus

- Location within Missouri Location within the United States
- Location: Columbia, Missouri
- Coordinates: 38°56′27″N 92°19′17″W
- Area: 7 acres (2.8 ha)
- Built: 1888
- NRHP reference No.: 66000413

Significant dates
- Added to NRHP: October 15, 1966
- Designated NHL: July 19, 1964

Sanborn Field is an agricultural experiment field, located on the University of Missouri campus in Columbia, Missouri. Established in 1888, it was the first facility in the United States intended to measure erosion and run-off for differing crops and agricultural practices. Work at Sanborn Field was influential in the establishment of soil conservation policy in the United States. The field was designated a National Historic Landmark in 1964.

The field is currently managed as part of the Agricultural Extension Station under the university's School of Natural Resources.

== Description ==
Sanborn Field is located on the east side of the University of Missouri campus, on land purchased by the state for the university campus during the 1870s. It is roughly 7 acres (2.8 ha) in size, and is bounded by Bouchelle Avenue, Connaway Hall, Rollins Street, and College Avenue. Once in a rural area, the field is now surrounded by built-up portions of Columbia. It is subdivided into plots measuring 52.5 by 118.5 feet (16.0 m × 36.1 m).

== History ==
The field was established by Dean J.W. Sanborn, who sought to understand the value of manure as a fertilizer, and the use of crop rotation. In 1914, emphasis was shifted away from manure and toward chemical fertilizers. Other experiments focused on the recovery of exhausted soils. The plots continue to be used today for long-term experimentation on differing schemes for the management of agricultural lands.

Chlortetracycline, the first tetracycline to be identified, was discovered in a sample of soil collected from plot 23 of Sanborn field in 1945.

== See also ==
- List of National Historic Landmarks in Missouri
- National Register of Historic Places listings in Boone County, Missouri
