= University and college buildings listed on the National Register of Historic Places =

This is an incomplete list of historic properties and districts at United States colleges and universities that are listed on the National Register of Historic Places (NRHP). This includes National Historic Landmarks (NHLs) and other National Register of Historic Places listings. It includes listings at current and former educational institutions.

The main list is organized by institution name. A second list of NHLs at colleges and universities is organized by state.

Of the colleges and universities listed here, the University of California, Berkeley, has the most NRHP listings, with 22, including one NHL. Tied for second are Harvard University with 17 NRHP listing including two historic districts and five NHLs, and the University of Florida which has 17, including one historic district with 14 contributing properties. The University of Wisconsin–Madison has the third most identified sites, with 16, of which four are NHLs.

== NRHPs by college or university ==
=== Abilene Christian University ===
In Abilene, Texas

- Abilene Christian College Administration Building
- Luce Hall

=== Alabama A&M University ===
	Site name	Image	Date listed	Location	City	Summary
1	Alabama Agricultural and Mechanical University Historic District	Alabama Agricultural and Mechanical University Historic District	December 31, 2001 (#01001407)	Chase Rd. 34°46′43″N 86°34′18″W	Normal, Alabama	

=== Alabama State University ===
	Site name	Image	Date listed	Location	City	Summary
1	Alabama State University Historic District		October 8, 1998	915 S. Jackson St. 32°21′51″N 86°17′51″W	Montgomery, Alabama	

=== University of Alabama ===
In Tuscaloosa, Alabama

- Foster Auditorium (NHL)

=== Alcorn State University ===
In Lorman, Mississippi, this university has 2 (1 NHL):

- Oakland Memorial Chapel (NHL)
- Alcorn State University Historic District

=== Alderson Broaddus University ===
In Philippi, West Virginia

	Name on the Register	Image	Date listed	Location	City or town	Description
1	Whitescarver Hall	Whitescarver Hall	February 5, 1990 (#89002317)	Circle Dr. on the Alderson Broaddus University campus 39°09′36″N 80°02′26″W	Philippi	

=== Allen University ===
	Landmark name	Image	Date listed	Location	City	Summary
1	Allen University Historic District	Chappelle Administration Building	April 14, 1975	1530 Harden St. 34°0′38″N 81°1′14″W	Columbia, South Carolina	
2	Chappelle Administration Building	Chappelle Administration Building	December 8, 1976	1530 Harden St. 34°0′39″N 81°1′16″W	Columbia, South Carolina	

=== Institute of American Indian Arts ===
In Santa Fe, New Mexico

- Federal Building

=== Anderson University ===
In Anderson, South Carolina

- Anderson College Historic District

=== Andover Newton Theological School ===
In Newton, Massachusetts

- Colby Hall (Newton, Massachusetts)

=== Arcadia University ===
In Glenside, Pennsylvania

- Grey Towers Castle (NHL)

=== University of Arizona ===
In Tucson, Arizona

- Men's Gymnasium
- Old Library Building
- Old Main

=== Arkansas Baptist College ===
In Little Rock, Arkansas

- Main Building, Arkansas Baptist College

=== University of Arkansas ===
In Fayetteville, Arkansas

- Agriculture Building – University of Arkansas, Fayetteville
- Business Administration Building – University of Arkansas, Fayetteville
- Chemistry Building – University of Arkansas, Fayetteville
- Chi Omega Greek Theatre – University of Arkansas, Fayetteville
- Home Economics Building – University of Arkansas, Fayetteville
- Men's Gymnasium – University of Arkansas, Fayetteville
- Old Main, University of Arkansas
- Student Union Building – University of Arkansas, Fayetteville
- University of Arkansas Campus Historic District
- Vol Walker Library – University of Arkansas, Fayetteville

=== University of the Arts ===
In Philadelphia, Pennsylvania

- Philadelphia College of Art

=== Asbury University ===
In Wilmore, Kentucky

- Asbury College Administration Building
- Morrison–Kenyon Library

=== Athens State University ===
In Athens, Alabama

- Athens State College Historic District

=== Auburn University ===
	Site name	Image	Date listed	Location	City	Summary
1	Auburn Players Theater	Auburn Players Theater	May 22, 1973 (#73000351)	139 S. College Street; 32°36′17″N 85°28′51″W	Auburn, Alabama	
2	Auburn University Historic District		June 3, 1976	Auburn University campus 32°36′17″N 85°28′58″W	Auburn, Alabama	
3	Cullars Rotation	Cullars Rotation	April 18, 2003 (#03000231)	Woodfield Dr., east of U.S. Route 29; 32°35′19″N 85°29′01″W	Auburn, Alabama	
4	Old President's Mansion	Old President's Mansion	August 29, 2003 (#03000423)	277 W. Thach Ave. on the Auburn University campus 32°36′12″N 85°29′06″W	Auburn, Alabama	
5	Old Rotation	Old Rotation	January 14, 1988 (#87002390)	Auburn University campus 32°35′36″N 85°29′09″W	Auburn, Alabama	

=== Augsburg University ===
In Minneapolis, Minnesota

- Old Main (Augsburg University)

=== Augusta State University ===
In Augusta, Georgia

- Stephen Vincent Benet House

=== Augustana College ===
	Landmark name	Image	Date listed	Location	City or Town	Summary
1	House on the Hill		September 11, 1975	3052 10th Ave. 41°30′5″N 90°33′19″W	Rock Island, Illinois	Listed as the Weyerhaeuser House.
2	Old Main		September 11, 1975	7th Ave. between 35th and 38th Sts. 41°30′15″N 90°32′58″W	Rock Island, Illinois	

=== Aurora University ===
In Aurora, Illinois

- Aurora College Complex (Eckhart, Davis & Wilkinson Halls)

=== Austin Peay State University ===
In Clarksville, Tennessee

- Archwood
- Emerald Hill

=== Baldwin Wallace University ===
In Berea, Ohio

- Baldwin-Wallace College South Campus Historic District

=== Ball State University ===
In Muncie, Indiana

- Bracken House

=== Barber–Scotia College ===
In Concord, North Carolina

- Barber–Scotia College

=== Bates College ===
In Lewiston, Maine

- Hathorn Hall

=== Beth College ===
In North Newton, Kansas

- Bethel College Administration Building

=== Belmont Abbey College ===
In Belmont, North Carolina

- Belmont Abbey Cathedral
- Belmont Abbey Historic District

=== Benedict College ===
In Columbia, South Carolina

- Benedict College Historic District

=== Bennett College ===
In Greensboro, North Carolina

- Bennett College Historic District

=== Berea College ===
In Berea, Kentucky

- Lincoln Hall, Berea College (NHL)

=== Berry College ===
	Site name	Image	Date listed	Location	City	Summary
1	Berry Schools	Berry Schools	July 21, 1978 (#78000981)	North of Rome, Georgia on U.S. 27; 34°18′27″N 85°12′49″W	Rome, Georgia	NRHP district including entire campus of Berry College and the former Berry Schools.

=== Bethany College (Bethany, West Virginia) ===
In Bethany, West Virginia

	Name on the Register	Image	Date listed	Location	City or town	Description
1	Alexander Campbell Mansion	Alexander Campbell Mansion	October 15, 1970 (#70000651)	East of Bethany on West Virginia Route 67; 40°12′27″N 80°32′51″W	Bethany	
2	Old Main, Bethany College	Old Main, Bethany College	August 25, 1970 (#70000652)	Bethany College campus 40°12′21″N 80°33′37″W	Bethany	
3	Pendleton Heights	Pendleton Heights	June 26, 1975 (#75001882)	Bethany College campus 40°12′24″N 80°33′35″W	Bethany	

=== Bethune–Cookman University ===
In Daytona Beach, Florida

- Bethune–Cookman College Historic District
- Mary McLeod Bethune Home (NHL)

=== Birmingham–Southern College ===
In Birmingham, Alabama

- Birmingham–Southern College

=== Blue Mountain Christian University ===
In Blue Mountain, Mississippi

- Blue Mountain College Historic District

=== Bluefield State University ===
In Bluefield, West Virginia

	Name on the Register	Image	Date listed	Location	City or town	Description
1	President's House, Bluefield State College		December 3, 1999 (#99001400)	Rock St. 37°16′04″N 81°14′09″W	Bluefield	

=== Brandeis University ===
In Waltham, Massachusetts

- Brandeis University President's House (Newtonville)
- The Castle

=== Brown University ===
In Providence, Rhode Island

- University Hall (Brown University) (NHL)
- Nightingale–Brown House (NHL)
- Gardner House
- Corliss–Brackett House
- Ladd Observatory

=== Boston College ===
In Chestnut Hill, Newton, Massachusetts

- Boston College Main Campus Historic District

=== Bowdoin College ===
In Brunswick, Maine

- Massachusetts Hall, Bowdoin College

=== Bronx Community College ===
In The Bronx, New York

	Site name	Image	Date listed	Location	City	Summary
1	Hall of Fame Complex	Hall of Fame Complex	September 7, 1979 (#79001567)	Bronx Community College campus 40°51′31″N 73°54′52″W	University Heights	Outdoor sculpture gallery located on the grounds of Bronx Community College
2	University Heights Campus (Bronx Community College of The City University of New York)	University Heights Campus (Bronx Community College of The City University of New York)	October 16, 2012 (#12001013)	West 181st St. and University Ave. 40°51′29″N 73°54′45″W	University Heights	First community college in the U.S. to be designated as a National Historic Landmark

=== Bryn Mawr College ===
In Bryn Mawr, Pennsylvania

- Bryn Mawr College Historic District
- Old Library (NHL)

=== Butler University ===
In Indianapolis, Indiana:

- Hinkle Fieldhouse (NHL)

=== PennWest California ===
In California, Pennsylvania

- Old Main, California State College

=== University of California, Berkeley ===
In Berkeley, California, has

- Bowles Hall
- California Hall
- California Memorial Stadium
- Doe Memorial Library
- Durant Hall
- Faculty Club
- Founders' Rock
- Giannini Hall
- Gilman Hall Room 307(NHL)
- Haviland Hall
- Hearst Greek Theatre
- Hearst Gymnasium for Women
- Hearst Memorial Mining Building
- Hilgard Hall
- LeConte Hall
- North Gate Hall
- Sather Gate and Bridge
- Sather Tower
- South Hall (UC Berkeley)
- University House, Berkeley
- Wellman Hall
- Wheeler Hall

=== University of California, Davis ===
In Davis, California has

- George Hart Hall

=== University of California, San Diego ===
In La Jolla, California has

- Audrey Geisel University House
- Old Scripps Building

=== California State University, Long Beach ===
In Long Beach, California

- Puvunga Indian Village Sites

=== Carleton College ===
In Northfield, Minnesota has 4:

- Goodsell Observatory
- Scoville Memorial Library (Carleton College)
- Skinner Memorial Chapel
- Willis Hall (Carleton College)

=== Case Western Reserve University ===
In Cleveland, Ohio

- Adelbert Hall, Case Western Reserve University
- Allen Memorial Medical Library

=== Centenary College of Louisiana ===
In Jackson, Louisiana

- Centenary College

=== Centenary University ===
In Hackettstown, New Jersey

	Name on the Register	Image	Date listed	Location	City or town	Description
1	Centenary Collegiate Institute	Centenary Collegiate Institute	June 13, 1997 (#97000564)	400 Jefferson Street; 40°50′57″N 74°49′57″W	Hackettstown	Old Main

=== University of Central Arkansas ===
In Conway, Arkansas

- Administration Building, University of Central Arkansas

=== Centre College ===
In Danville, Kentucky:

- Old Centre

=== University of Chicago ===
In Chicago, Illinois

- George Herbert Jones Laboratory (NHL)

=== University of Cincinnati ===
In Cincinnati, Ohio

- Cincinnati Observatory (NHL)

=== Claflin University ===
In Orangeburg, South Carolina

- Claflin College Historic District

=== Clark University ===
In Worcester, Massachusetts

- Clark University

=== Clemson University ===
	Landmark name	Image	Date listed	Location	City or Town	Summary
1	Clemson College Sheep Barn	Clemson College Sheep Barn	January 4, 1990	S. Palmetto Boulevard on the Clemson University campus 34°40′36″N 82°49′50″W	Clemson, South Carolina	Built in 1915, it is the oldest extant agricultural building on campus.
2	Clemson University Historic District I	Tillman Hall, Clemson University, Clemson, South Carolina	January 4, 1990	Northern portion of campus along U.S. Route 76; 34°40′47″N 82°50′4″W	Clemson, South Carolina	Collection of some of Clemson's original building located along the northern edge of campus. Contributing properties include: Tillman Hall (1893), Godfey Hall (1898), Bowman Field (1900), Sikes Hall (1905), Holtendorff Hall (1916), Trustees' Park (c. 1925), Long Hall (1937), and Mell Hall (1939).
3	Clemson University Historic District II	Amphitheater, Clemson University, Clemson, South Carolina	January 4, 1990	Center of campus 34°40′40″N 82°50′18″W	Clemson, South Carolina	Located in the central part of campus. Contributing properties include: Fort Hill (c. 1830), John C. Calhoun Office (c. 1825), Hardin Hall (1890), the Trustee House (1904), Riggs Hall (1927), Sirrine Hall (1938), and the Outdoor Theater (1940).
4	Fort Hill	Fort Hill, Clemson Campus	October 15, 1966	Clemson University campus 34°40′40″N 82°50′21″W	Clemson, South Carolina	John C. Calhoun's original plantation house, later passed down to his daughter and Thomas Greene Clemson. Today, the house serves as a museum.
5	Hanover House	Hanover House, Clemson, South Carolina	June 5, 1970	Clemson University campus 34°40′35″N 82°49′52″W	Clemson, South Carolina	This 1710s house originally built in Berkeley County, but was moved to Clemson in the 1940s due to the creation of Lake Moultrie.
6	Structural Science Building	Lowry Hall at Clemson University	April 5, 2010	Palmetto Boulevard and Fernow Drive; 34°40′30.5″N 82°50′18″W	Clemson, South Carolina	Lee and Lowry Halls were built in 1958, and heralded the style of Clemson's building expansion of the 1960s and 1970s. They were designed by the Dean of the College of Architecture, Harlan Ewart McClure, who also played an important role in the desegregation of the university in 1963.

=== College of Charleston ===
	Landmark name	Image	Date listed	Location	City	Summary
1	College of Charleston Complex	1940 picture from HABS of the Main building	November 11, 1971	Glebe, George, St. Philip, and Green Sts. 32°47′4″N 79°56′15″W	Charleston, South Carolina	

=== Colgate University ===
In Hamilton, New York

- Old Biology Hall

=== Columbia University ===
In New York, NY has at least 11 (3 NHLs):

- Brooks and Hewitt Halls
- Casa Italiana
- Delta Psi, Alpha Chapter
- Earl Hall
- Hotel Theresa
- Low Memorial Library (NHL)
- Milbank, Brinckerhoff, and Fiske Halls
- Philosophy Hall (NHL)
- Pupin Hall (NHL)
- Sheffield Farms Stable (demolished)
- Students' Hall
- Union Theological Seminary

Additionally, the 116th Street–Columbia University station is listed on the NRHP as part of the New York Subway System Multiple Property Submission.

=== Concordia College ===
In Moorhead, Minnesota has 1:

- Main Building, Concordia College

=== University of Connecticut ===
In Mansfield, Connecticut

- University of Connecticut Historic District – Connecticut Agricultural School

=== Cooper Union ===
In New York, New York (NHL)

=== Cornell University ===
In Ithaca, New York, has 10 (1 NHL):

- Andrew Dickson White House
- Bailey Hall
- Caldwell Hall
- Comstock Hall
- Delta Kappa Epsilon / "Deke" House
- Fernow Hall
- Llenroc
- Morrill Hall (NHL)
- Rice Hall
- Wing Hall

In addition, East Robert Hall, Roberts Hall, and Stone Hall are former buildings that are still listed on the National Register despite having been demolished. See Cornell University#Historic Sites for how these are described in the article about the university.

=== Davidson College ===
In Davidson, North Carolina

- Eumenean Hall, Davidson College
- Philanthropic Hall, Davidson College

=== Davis & Elkins College ===
In Elkins, West Virginia

	Name on the Register	Image	Date listed	Location	City or town	Description
1	Albert and Liberal Arts Halls	Albert and Liberal Arts Halls	August 29, 1979 (#79002599)	Davis and Elkins College campus 38°55′49″N 79°50′46″W	Elkins	
2	Davis and Elkins Historic District	Davis and Elkins Historic District	June 19, 1996 (#96001129)	Davis and Elkins College campus 38°55′48″N 79°50′50″W	Elkins	
3	Senator Stephen Benton Elkins House	Senator Stephen Benton Elkins House	September 2, 1982 (#82004329)	Davis and Elkins College campus 38°55′51″N 79°50′50″W	Elkins	
4	Graceland	Graceland	September 17, 1970 (#70000666)	Davis and Elkins College campus 38°55′51″N 79°50′57″W	Elkins	

=== Dakota Wesleyan University ===
In Mitchell, South Dakota, the entire university, apparently, is NRHP-listed.

=== Dickinson College ===
In Carlisle, Pennsylvania:

- Old West, Dickinson College (NHL)

=== Doane University ===
In Crete, Nebraska

- Doane College Historic Buildings

=== Drake University ===
	Landmark name	Image	Date listed	Location	City	Summary
1	Drake University Campus Historic District		September 8, 1988	Roughly two blocks along University Ave. near 25th St. 41°36′03″N 93°39′07″W	Des Moines, Iowa	

=== Drexel University ===
In Philadelphia, Pennsylvania

- Woman's Medical College of Pennsylvania

=== Drury University ===
In Springfield, Missouri

- Stone Chapel

=== University of Dubuque ===
In Dubuque, Iowa

- Old Chapel Hall

=== Earlham College ===
In Richmond, Indiana:

- Earlham College Observatory

=== Eastern Illinois University ===
In Charleston, Illinois

- Pemberton Hall and Gymnasium

=== Eastern Michigan University ===
In Ypsilanti, Michigan

- Eastern Michigan University Historic District
- Pease Auditorium

=== Eastern Oregon University ===
In La Grande, Oregon:

- Administration Building

=== PennWest Edinboro ===
	Landmark name	Image	Date listed	Location	Municipality	Summary
1	Academy Hall		November 21, 2006	Junction of High and Normal Streets; 41°52′19.3″N 80°7′41.2″W	Edinboro, Pennsylvania	

=== Edward Waters University ===
	Landmark name	Image	Date listed	Location	City	Summary
1	Centennial Hall at Edward Waters University		May 4, 1976	1715 Kings Road; 30°20′40″N 81°41′4″W	Jacksonville, Florida	

=== Elmira College ===
In Elmira, New York

- Elmira College Old Campus

=== Emory University ===
In Atlanta, Georgia

- Emory Grove Historic District
- Emory University Historic District
- Oxford Historic District
- University Park–Emory Highlands–Emory Estates Historic District

=== Emory and Henry University ===
In Emory, Virginia

- Emory and Henry University

=== Erskine College ===
	Landmark name	Image	Date listed	Location	City	Summary
1	Erskine College–Due West Historic District		March 19, 1982	Main, Church, College, Bonner, Hayne, Washington, Cleveland, Depot, and Abbeville Sts. 34°19′45″N 82°23′26″W	Due West, South Carolina	Includes part of the college and part of the town. It has 88 contributing properties.

=== Eleutherian College ===
In Jefferson County, Indiana

- Eleutherian College Classroom and Chapel Building (NHL)

=== Eureka College ===
In Eureka, Illinois

- Eureka College Administration and Chapel

=== University of Evansville ===
In Evansville, Indiana

- Evansville College

=== Fairmont State University ===
In Fairmont, West Virginia

	Name on the Register	Image	Date listed	Location	City or town	Description
1	Fairmont Normal School Administration Building	Fairmont Normal School Administration Building	March 28, 1994 (#94000216)	Junction of Locust Ave. and Bryant St. 39°28′59″N 80°09′37″W	Fairmont	

=== Finlandia University ===
In Hancock, Michigan

- Old Main, Suomi College

=== Fisk University ===
In Nashville, Tennessee

- Fisk University Carnegie Library
- Fisk University Historic District
- Jubilee Hall (NHL)

=== Florida A&M University ===
In Tallahassee, Florida

- Carnegie Library

=== Florida Institute of Technology (Jensen Beach Campus) ===
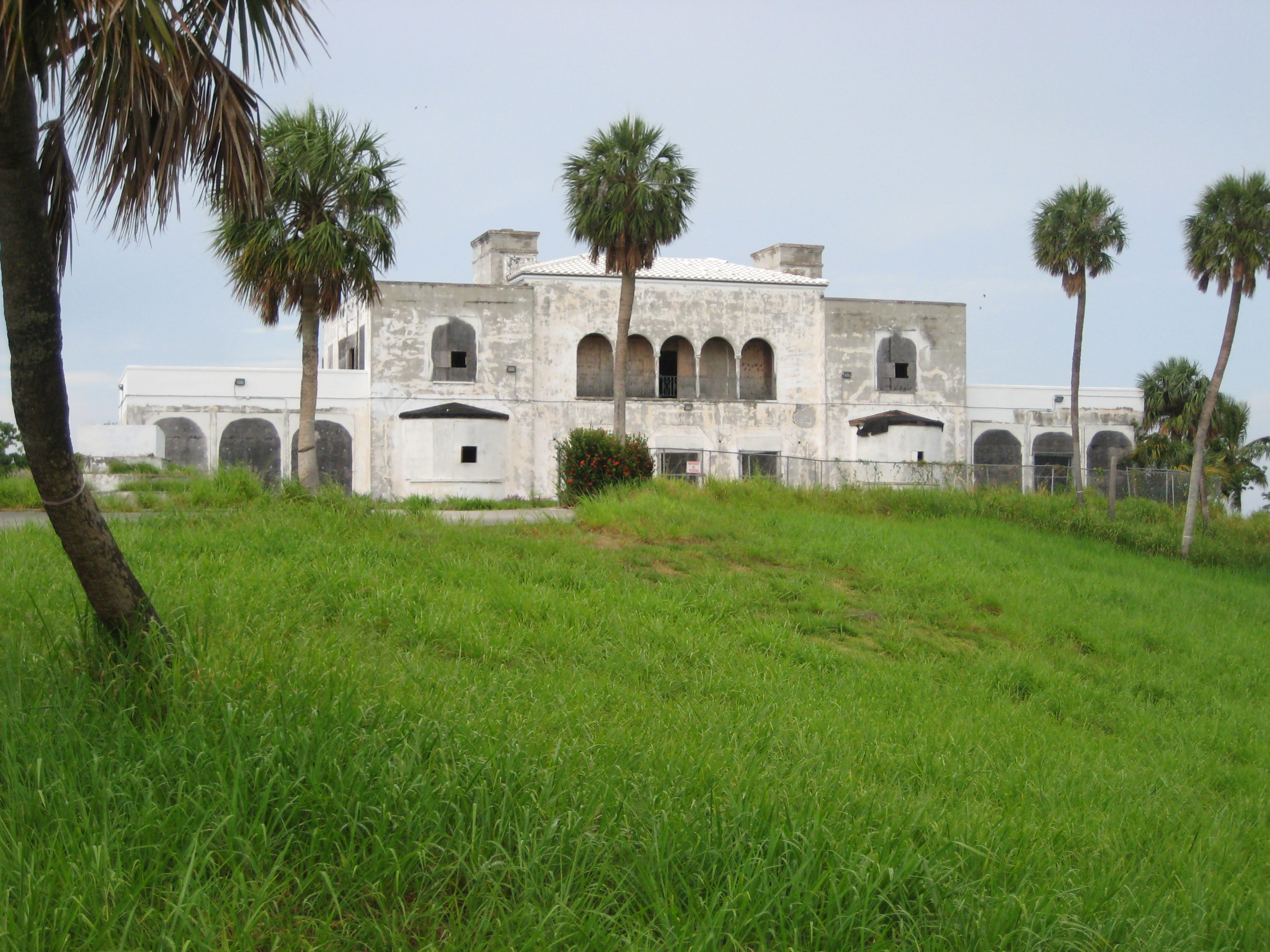
Tuckahoe atop Mount Elizabeth

in Jensen Beach, Florida The former campus, which was previously the campus of Saint Joseph College of Florida, contains two NRHPs, one sitting on top of the other:

- Tuckahoe (Florida), once the administration building of both colleges, is a 1938 mansion built on top of:
- Mount Elizabeth Archeological Site, a prehistoric midden.

=== University of Florida ===
	Landmark name	Image	Date listed	Location	City or Town	Summary
1	Anderson Hall		June 27, 1979	West University Avenue; 29°39′5″N 82°20′32″W	Gainesville, Florida	
2	Bryan Hall		June 27, 1979	West University Avenue and 13th Street; 29°39′3″N 82°20′26″W	Gainesville, Florida	
3	Buckman Hall		January 11, 1974	Buckman Drive (Southwest 17th Street); 29°39′2″N 82°20′43″W	Gainesville, Florida	
4	Flint Hall		June 27, 1979	West University Avenue; 29°39′6″N 82°20′37″W	Gainesville, Florida	
5	Griffin–Floyd Hall		June 27, 1979	University of Florida campus 29°38′59″N 82°20′38″W	Gainesville, Florida	
6	The Hub		June 24, 2008	Stadium Road between Buckman Drive and Fletcher Drive; 29°38′55″N 82°20′44″W	Gainesville, Florida	Part of the University of Florida Campus MPS
7	Library East		June 27, 1979	Murphree Way; 29°39′2″N 82°20′31″W	Gainesville, Florida	
8	Newell Hall		June 27, 1979	Stadium Road; 29°38′56″N 82°20′43″W	Gainesville, Florida	
9	Old WRUF Radio Station		September 21, 1989	Museum Road and Newell Drive; 29°39′12″N 82°20′36″W	Gainesville, Florida	
10	Norman Hall		January 26, 1990	Southwest 13th Street on the University of Florida campus 29°38′48″N 82°20′17″W	Gainesville, Florida	
11	Peabody Hall		June 27, 1979	University of Florida campus 29°38′59″N 82°20′31″W	Gainesville, Florida	
12	Rolfs Hall		September 11, 1986	Buckman Drive on the University of Florida campus 29°38′57″N 82°20′30″W	Gainesville, Florida	
13	Thomas Hall		October 1, 1974	Fletcher Drive on the University of Florida campus 29°39′3″N 82°20′46″W	Gainesville, Florida	
14	University of Florida Campus Historic District		April 20, 1989	Bounded by West University Avenue, Southwest 13th Street, Stadium Road, and North-South Drive; 29°39′1″N 82°20′38″W	Gainesville, Florida	
15	Weil Hall		June 24, 2008	Stadium Road and Gale Lemerand Drive (North-South Drive); 29°38′54″N 82°20′53″W	Gainesville, Florida	part of the University of Florida Campus MPS
16	Women's Gymnasium		June 27, 1979	East-West Road; 29°39′1″N 82°20′49″W	Gainesville, Florida	
17	Yulee–Mallory–Reid dormitory complex		June 24, 2008	13th Street and Inner Road, SW. 29°38′50″N 82°20′28″W	Gainesville, Florida	Part of the University of Florida Campus MPS

University of Florida Campus Historic District has the following contributing properties:

- Carlton Auditorium
- Century Tower
- Dauer Hall, 1936
- Fletcher Hall, 1938–1939
- Florida Gymnasium
- Infirmary, 1931
- Leigh Hall, 1927
- Matherly Hall
- Murphree Hall, 1939
- Plaza of the Americas
- Sledd Hall, 1930
- Tigert Hall
- University Auditorium, 1922
- Walker Hall, 1927

=== Florida Southern College ===
In Lakeland, Florida

- Florida Southern College Architectural District

=== Framingham State University ===
In Framingham, Massachusetts

- The former St. John's Episcopal Church (Framingham, Massachusetts) is now the Ecumenical Center at Framingham State University.

=== Franklin College ===
In Franklin, Indiana

- Franklin College Library (Shirk Hall)
- Franklin College–Old Main

=== Franklin & Marshall College ===
In Lancaster, Pennsylvania

- Diagnothian Hall
- Goethean Hall
- Old Main

=== Gallaudet University ===
In Washington, D.C. has 3:

- Chapel Hall, Gallaudet College
- Gallaudet College Historic District
- President's House, Gallaudet College

=== George Fox University ===
In Newberg, Oregon

- Jesse Edwards House
- Minthorn Hall

=== Georgetown College ===
In Georgetown, Kentucky

- Georgetown College Historic Buildings
- Giddings Hall, Georgetown College

=== Georgetown University ===
In Washington, D.C. has 2 (1 NHL):

- Georgetown University Astronomical Observatory
- Healy Building, Georgetown University (NHL)

=== Georgia College & State University ===
In Milledgeville, Georgia

- Atkinson Hall, Georgia College

=== Georgia Institute of Technology ===
In Atlanta, Georgia

- Georgia Institute of Technology Historic District
- Omega Chapter of the Chi Phi Fraternity

=== University of Georgia ===
In Athens, Georgia

- Jackson Street Cemetery
- Lucy Cobb Institute
- Old North Campus, University of Georgia

In addition, Garden Club of Georgia Museum–Headquarters House, Founder's Memorial Garden and Gov. Wilson Lumpkin House are on the campus and may be part of the University of Georgia.

=== Georgia State University ===
In Atlanta, Georgia

- Dixie Coca-Cola Bottling Company Plant

=== Georgian Court University ===
In Lakewood, New Jersey

- Georgian Court (NHL)

=== Gettysburg College ===
In Gettysburg, Pennsylvania

- Pennsylvania Hall, Gettysburg College

=== Goucher College ===
In Towson, Maryland

- Goucher College
- Old Goucher College Buildings (Baltimore, Maryland)

=== Grand View University ===
	Landmark name	Image	Date listed	Location	City	Summary
1	Old Main		May 23, 1978	1200 Grandview Ave. 41°37′15″N 93°36′15″W	Des Moines, Iowa	Now known as the Humphrey Center.

=== Greenville University ===
In Greenville, Illinois

- Old Main, Almira College

=== Grinnell College ===
	Landmark name	Image	Date listed	Location	City or Town	Summary
1	Goodnow Hall		April 26, 1979	1118 Park St. 41°44′49″N 92°43′19″W	Grinnell, Iowa	
2	Mears Cottage		April 26, 1979	1213 6th Ave. 41°44′49″N 92°43′07″W	Grinnell, Iowa	Listed as Mears Hall.
2	Forum		April 26, 1979	1119 6th Ave. 41°44′50″N 92°43′12″W	Grinnell, Iowa	

=== Guilford College ===
In Greensboro, North Carolina

- Guilford College

=== Gustavus Adolphus College ===
In St. Peter, Minnesota has 1:

- Old Main, Gustavus Adolphus College

=== Hamilton College ===
In Clinton, New York

- Hamilton College Chapel
- Elihu Root House (NHL)

=== Hampton University ===
In Hampton, Virginia (NHL)

=== Hampden–Sydney College ===
In Hampden Sydney, Virginia

- Hampden–Sydney College Historic District

- Cushing Hall
- Venable Hall

=== Hanover College ===
In Hanover, Indiana

- Thomas A. Hendricks Library

=== Hardin–Simmons University ===
In Abilene, Texas

- Caldwell Hall

=== Harding University ===
	Site name	Image	Date listed	Location	City	Summary
1	Pattie Cobb Hall	Pattie Cobb Hall	September 5, 1991 (#91001209)	900 E. Center at Harding University; 35°14′50″N 91°43′40″W	Searcy, Arkansas	

=== Harris–Stowe State University ===
In St. Louis, Missouri

- Harris Teachers College

=== Hartwick College ===
In Oneonta, New York

- Bresee Hall

=== Harvard University ===
In Cambridge, Massachusetts

- Austin Hall (Harvard University)
- Bertram Hall at Radcliffe College
- Carpenter Center for the Visual Arts
- Eliot Hall at Radcliffe College
- Fogg Art Museum
- Harvard Houses Historic District
- Harvard Stadium in Boston, Massachusetts
- Harvard Union
- Hasty Pudding Club
- Massachusetts Hall, Harvard University (NHL)
- Memorial Hall (Harvard University) (NHL)
- Old Harvard Yard (NHL)
- Porcellian Club
- Sears Tower – Harvard Observatory
- Sever Hall (NHL)
- University Hall (Harvard University) (NHL)
- University Museum

=== Haskell Indian Nations University ===
In Lawrence, Kansas

- Haskell Institute (NHL)

=== Heidelberg University ===
In Tiffin, Ohio

- Founders Hall, Heidelberg College

=== Hendrix College ===
	Site name	Image	Date listed	Location	City	Summary
1	Martin Hall	Martin Hall	December 22, 1982 (#82000815)	1600 Washington Ave; 35°05′58″N 92°26′28″W	Conway, Arkansas	
2	Galloway Hall	Galloway Hall	December 22, 1982 (#82000953)	1600 Washington Ave; 35°06′06″N 92°26′28″W	Conway, Arkansas	
3	President's House	President's House	December 22, 1982 (#82000816)	1600 Washington Ave; 35°05′53″N 92°26′32″W	Conway, Arkansas	
4	Young Memorial	Young Memorial	July 19, 1996 (#96000758)	1600 Washington Ave; 35°06′01″N 92°26′30″W	Conway, Arkansas	Also known as War Memorial Monument or Doughboy

=== College of the Holy Cross ===
In Worcester, Massachusetts

- College of the Holy Cross

=== Huntingdon College ===
In Montgomery, Alabama

- Huntingdon College Campus Historic District

=== Huston–Tillotson University ===
In Austin, Texas

- Administration Hall

=== Illinois Institute of Technology ===
In Chicago, Illinois

- Illinois Institute of Technology Academic Campus
- S.R. Crown Hall (NHL)

=== Illinois College ===
In Jacksonville, Illinois

- Beecher Hall, Illinois College

=== Illinois State University ===
In Normal, Illinois

- John W. Cook Hall

=== University of Illinois at Chicago ===
Chicago, Illinois

- Hull House (NHL)

=== University of Illinois at Urbana–Champaign ===
In Urbana and Champaign, Illinois

- Altgeld Hall
- Chemical Laboratory
- Library–University of Illinois at Urbana–Champaign
- Metal Shop
- Military Drill Hall and Men's Gymnasium
- Morrow Plots, University of Illinois (NHL)
- Mumford House
- Natural History Building
- Tina Weedon Smith Memorial Hall
- University of Illinois Astronomical Observatory (NHL)
- University of Illinois Experimental Dairy Farm Historic District
- Women's Gymnasium, University of Illinois at Urbana–Champaign
- Women's Residence Hall–West Residence Hall, University of Illinois at Urbana–Champaign

=== University of the Incarnate Word ===
In San Antonio, Texas

- University of Incarnate Word Administration Building

=== Indiana State University ===
In Terre Haute, Indiana

- Federal Hall

=== Indiana University (Bloomington) ===
In Bloomington, Indiana

- Legg House
- Millen House
- The Old Crescent
- Andrew Wylie House

=== Iowa State University ===
In Ames, Iowa

- The Farm House (Knapp–Wilson House) (NHL)
- Agriculture Hall
- Alumni Hall
- Christian Petersen Courtyard Sculptures, and Dairy Industry Building
- Engineering Hall
- Marston Water Tower

=== University of Iowa ===
In Iowa City, IA has 1 NHL and 1 other NRHP:

- Old Capitol (NHL)
- Pentacrest

=== Iowa Wesleyan University ===
	Landmark name	Image	Date listed	Location	City	Summary
1	Harlan–Lincoln House		May 25, 1973	101 W. Broad St. 40°58′18″N 91°32′57″W	Mount Pleasant, Iowa	Formerly served as the college president's house, an administrative building and it housed the art department. It is now a museum.
2	Old Main		March 26, 1973	Iowa Wesleyan College campus 40°58′31″N 91°32′34″W	Mount Pleasant, Iowa	

=== Johns Hopkins University ===
In Baltimore, Maryland

- Homewood Museum
- Evergreen Museum & Library

=== Johnson C. Smith University ===
In Charlotte, North Carolina

- Biddle Memorial Hall, Johnson C. Smith University

=== Judson College ===
In Marion, Alabama

- Judson College Historic District

=== Kansas State University ===
In Manhattan, Kansas

- Anderson Hall

=== Kean University ===
In Union, New Jersey

	Name on the Register	Image	Date listed	Location	City or town	Description
1	William Livingston House	William Livingston House	November 28, 1972 (#72000807)	Morris and North Aves. 40°40′40″N 74°13′41″W	Union	Liberty Hall, Kean University
2	James Townley House	James Townley House	May 14, 1979 (#79001530)	Morris Ave. and Green Lane; 40°40′54″N 74°14′07″W	Union	On the campus of Kean University

=== Kenyon College ===
In Gambier, Ohio

- Kenyon College

=== Knox College (Illinois) ===
In Galesburg, Illinois:

- Old Main, Knox College (NHL)

=== Lafayette College ===
In Easton, Pennsylvania

	Name on the Register	Image	Date listed	Location	City or town	Description
1	College Hill Residential Historic District	College Hill Residential Historic District	May 1, 1991 (#91000506)	Roughly bounded by McCartney Street, Pierce Street, Pardee Street, the Forks Township line and the Delaware River; 40°42′17″N 75°12′17″W	Easton	McKelvy House, owned by Lafayette College, is a contributing property
2	Zeta Psi Fraternity House	Zeta Psi Fraternity House	May 21, 2001 (#01000506)	49 South College Drive; 40°41′51″N 75°12′28″W	Easton	

=== LaGrange College ===
In LaGrange, Georgia

- College Home/Smith Hall

=== Lake Erie College ===
In Painesville, Ohio

- Administration Building, Lake Erie College

=== Lander University ===
In Greenwood, South Carolina

- Lander College Old Main Building

=== Lane College ===
In Jackson, Tennessee:

- Lane College Historic District and Boundary Increase

=== Lawrence University ===
In Appleton, Wisconsin:

- Main Hall

=== Lehigh University ===
In Bethlehem, Pennsylvania

	Name on the Register	Image	Date listed	Location	City or town	Description
1	Packer Memorial Chapel	Packer Memorial Chapel	November 20, 1979 (#79003234)	Packer Avenue, Lehigh University; 40°36′27″N 75°22′41″W	Bethlehem	

=== Lewis & Clark College ===
In Portland, Oregon:

- M. Lloyd Frank Estate

=== Limestone University ===
In Gaffney, South Carolina

- Winnie Davis Hall

=== Lincoln Memorial University ===
In Knoxville, Tennessee

- Old Knoxville City Hall

=== Lincoln University of Missouri ===
In Jefferson City, Missouri

- Lincoln Univ. Hilltop Campus Historic District

=== Linfield University ===
In McMinnville, Oregon

- Pioneer Hall (Oregon)

=== Longwood University ===
	Site name	Image	Date listed	Location	City	Summary
1	Robert Russa Moton High School	Robert Russa Moton High School	August 5, 1998 (#95001177)	Griffin Blvd. 37°17′28″N 78°23′52″W	Farmville, Virginia	Moton High School is the site of a 1951 student-led strike over conditions at the segregated school. The resulting lawsuit became part of and provided the most plaintiffs for Brown v. Board of Education. The school, now an award-winning museum affiliated with Longwood University, is the student birthplace of the American Civil Rights Movement.

=== Louisiana State University ===
In Baton Rouge, Louisiana

- The French House
- Louisiana State University, Baton Rouge
- LSU Campus Mounds

=== University of Louisville ===
In Louisville, Kentucky

- University of Louisville Belknap Campus

=== Luther College ===
	Landmark name	Image	Date listed	Location	City or Town	Summary
1	Koren Library		January 12, 1984	Luther College campus 43°18′38″N 91°48′14″W	Decorah, Iowa	Now known as Koren Hall
2	Luther College Farm		July 17, 1979	Luther College campus 43°19′04″N 91°48′07″W	Decorah, Iowa	

=== Lutheran Theological Seminary at Gettysburg ===
In Gettysburg, Pennsylvania

- Lutheran Theological Seminary–Old Dorm

=== University of Maine at Orono ===
In Orono, Maine

- University of Maine at Orono Historic District

=== Manhattanville University ===
In Purchase, New York

- Reid Hall, Manhattanville College

=== Mars Hill University ===
In Mars Hill, North Carolina

- Mars Hill College Historic District

=== Martin Luther College ===
In New Ulm, Minnesota

- Old Main, Dr. Martin Luther College

=== Mary Baldwin University ===
In Staunton, Virginia

- Hilltop
- Kable House
- Mary Baldwin College, Main Building

=== Macalester College ===
In Saint Paul, Minnesota

- Old Main, Macalester College

=== Manchester University ===
In North Manchester, Indiana

- Manchester University Historic District

=== Marycrest College ===
In Davenport, Iowa

- Marycrest College Historic District

=== University of Maryland, Baltimore ===
- College of Medicine of Maryland (NHL)

=== University of Massachusetts Lowell ===
In Lowell, Massachusetts

- Allen House

=== McDaniel College ===
In Westminster, Maryland

- Western Maryland College Historic District

=== McMurry University ===
In Abilene, Texas

- McMurry College Administration Building

=== Mercer University ===
In Macon, Georgia

- Mercer University Administration Building

=== Miami University ===
In Oxford, Ohio

- Elliott and Stoddard Halls
- Herron Gymnasium (demolished)
- Langstroth Cottage (NHL)
- Oxford Female Institute
- Oxford Female College (demolished)
- Sigma Alpha Epsilon Chapter House of Miami University
- William H. McGuffey House (NHL)
- Zachariah Price Dewitt Cabin

=== University of Michigan ===
In Ann Arbor, Michigan

- Detroit Observatory
- Newberry Hall
- President's House, University Of Michigan
- University Of Michigan Central Campus Historic District

=== Michigan State University ===
In East Lansing, Michigan

- Eustace Hall

=== Michigan Technological University ===
In Houghton, Michigan

- College Club House and Gymnasium

=== Middlebury College ===
In Middlebury, Vermont

- Emma Willard House

=== Miles College ===
In Fairfield, Alabama

- Miles Memorial College Historic District

=== Minnesota State University, Mankato ===
In Mankato, Minnesota

- Old Main, Mankato State Teachers College

=== University of Minnesota ===
- Soudan Underground Mine State Park (remote laboratory)

In Minneapolis, Minnesota

- University of Minnesota Old Campus Historic District
- Northrop Mall Historic District

=== University of Minnesota Duluth ===
- Duluth State Normal School Historic District, now known as the "Lower Campus"

=== University of Minnesota Morris ===
In Morris, Minnesota

- Morris Industrial School for Indians Dormitory
- West Central School of Agriculture and Experiment Station Historic District

=== Dakota College at Bottineau ===
In Bottineau, North Dakota

- Old Main (Dakota College at Bottineau)

=== University of Mississippi ===
In Oxford, Mississippi

- Lyceum-The Circle Historic District

=== Mississippi State University ===
In Starkville, Mississippi

- Montgomery Hall
- Textile Building

=== Missouri Western State University ===
In St. Joseph, Missouri

- Robidoux School

=== University of Missouri ===
In Columbia, Missouri

- Francis Quadrangle Historic District
- Sanborn Field and Soil Erosion Plots (NHL)

=== Monmouth College ===
In Monmouth, Illinois

- Ivory Quinby House

=== Monmouth University ===
In West Long Branch, New Jersey

	Name on the Register	Image	Date listed	Location	City or town	Description
1	Murry Guggenheim House	Murry Guggenheim House	March 28, 1978 (#78001778)	Cedar and Norwood Aves. 40°16′56″N 74°00′12″W	West Long Branch	Also known as Guggenheim Library
2	Shadow Lawn	Shadow Lawn	March 28, 1978 (#78001780)	Cedar and Norwood Aves. 40°16′46″N 74°00′19″W	West Long Branch	

=== University of Montevallo ===
In Montevallo, Alabama

- Alabama Girls' Industrial School

=== Moore College of Art and Design ===
In Philadelphia, Pennsylvania

- Philadelphia School of Design for Women

=== Morehead State University ===
In Morehead, Kentucky

- Morehead State University

=== Morgan State University ===
In Baltimore, Maryland

- Morgan State University Memorial Chapel

=== Morningside University ===
	Landmark name	Image	Date listed	Location	City or Town	Summary
1	Charles City College Hall		January 21, 1983	1501 Morningside Ave. 42°28′30.8″N 96°21′36.4″W	Sioux City, Iowa	
2	Morningside College Historic District		May 14, 1997	Roughly bounded by Vine, Morningside, Garretson, Peters, and S. Paxton Aves. and Sioux Trail; 42°28′28″N 96°21′42″W	Sioux City, Iowa	

=== Mundelein College ===
In Chicago, Illinois

- Mundelein College Skyscraper Building

=== Murray State University ===
In Murray, Kentucky

- Murray State University Historic Buildings

=== Nebraska Wesleyan University ===
In Lincoln, Nebraska

- Phi Kappa Tau Fraternity House
- Old Main, Nebraska Wesleyan University

=== University of New England ===
In Portland, Maine

- Westbrook College Historic District

=== New Jersey Institute of Technology ===
In Newark, New Jersey

- Newark Orphan Asylum

=== New York University ===
In New York, New York

- General Winfield Scott House

=== University of North Alabama ===
In Florence, Alabama

- Wesleyan Hall

=== North Carolina Agricultural and Technical State University ===
In Greensboro, North Carolina

- Agricultural and Technical College of North Carolina Historic District

=== North Carolina Central University ===
In Durham, North Carolina

- North Carolina Central University

=== University of North Carolina at Chapel Hill ===
- Old East
- Old Chapel Hill Cemetery
- Playmakers Theatre

=== University of North Carolina at Pembroke ===
In Pembroke, North Carolina

- Old Main, Pembroke State University

=== North Dakota State University ===
In Fargo, North Dakota

- North Dakota State University District

=== Northeastern University ===
In Boston, Massachusetts

- Students House

=== Northern Michigan University ===
In Marquette, Michigan

- Longyear Hall of Pedagogy – Northern Michigan University

=== Northwestern College ===
In Orange City, Iowa

- Zwemer Hall

=== Notre Dame College ===
In South Euclid, Ohio

- Its 1927 Administration Building, which once housed the entire college operation, was added to the NRHP as Notre Dame College of Ohio

=== University of Notre Dame ===
In South Bend, Indiana

- University of Notre Dame: Main and South Quadrangles

=== Notre Dame de Namur University ===
In Belmont, California

- Ralston Hall (NHL)

=== Oberlin College ===
In Oberlin, Ohio

- the whole thing (NHL)

=== Ohio University ===
In Athens, Ohio

- Manasseh Cutler Hall, Ohio University (NHL)

=== Ohio Wesleyan University ===
In Delaware, Ohio

- Austin Hall
- Edwards Gymnasium/Pfieffer Natatorium
- Monnett Hall, former listing
- Ohio Wesleyan University Student Observatory
- Sanborn Hall
- Selby Field
- Stuyvesant Hall
- University Hall – Gray's Chapel

=== University of Oklahoma ===
In Norman, Oklahoma

- Beta Theta Pi Fraternity House
- Bizzell Memorial Library (NHL)
- Boyd House
- Casa Blanca

=== Oregon State University ===
In Corvallis, Oregon

- Oregon State University Historic District

=== University of Oregon ===
In Eugene, Oregon

- Dads' Gates
- Deady and Villard Halls, University of Oregon (NHL)
- Johnson Hall
- University Hall
- University of Oregon Library and Memorial Quadrangle
- University of Oregon Museum of Art
- Villard Hall
- Women's Memorial Quadrangle Ensemble

=== University of the Ozarks ===
In Clarksville, Arkansas

- Raymond Munger Memorial Chapel – University of the Ozarks

=== Pacific University ===
In Forest Grove, Oregon

- Old College Hall

=== Palmer College of Chiropractic ===
	Landmark name	Image	Date listed	Location	City or Town	Summary
1	B.J. Palmer House		July 27, 1984	808 Brady St. 41°31′34″N 90°34′29″W	Davenport, Iowa	
2	Hiram Price/Henry Vollmer House		July 7, 1983	723 Brady Street; 41°31′39″N 90°34′25″W	Davenport, Iowa	Houses the Office of Strategic Development

=== Park Region Luther College ===
In Fergus Falls, Minnesota

- the whole thing (84000241)

=== Peace College ===
In Raleigh, North Carolina

- Peace College Main Building

=== University of Pennsylvania ===
In Philadelphia, Pennsylvania

- College Hall (University of Pennsylvania)
- Fisher Fine Arts Library (NHL)
- Pennsylvania Hospital (NHL)
- St. Anthony Hall House
- University of Pennsylvania Campus Historic District

=== The Pennsylvania State University ===
In State College, Pennsylvania

- Ag Hill Historic District
- Farmer's High School Historic District

=== University of Pittsburgh ===
In Pittsburgh, Pennsylvania has 5 NRHPs:

- Allegheny Observatory
- Cathedral of Learning
- Ford Motor Building
- Pittsburgh Athletic Association
- The Schenley Farms National Historic District includes 17 university owned contributing properties:
  - Allen Hall
  - Alumni Hall
  - Bellefield Hall
  - Clapp Hall
  - Frick Fine Arts Building
  - Gardner Steel Conference Center
  - Heinz Memorial Chapel
  - Music Building
  - O'Hara Student Center
  - Ruskin Hall
  - Schenley Quadrangle (consisting of 5 individual residence halls)
  - Stephen Foster Memorial
  - Thackeray Hall
  - Thaw Hall
  - Twentieth Century Club
  - University Club
  - William Pitt Union

=== University of Portland ===
In Portland, Oregon:

- West Hall

=== University of Puerto Rico, Río Piedras Campus ===
In San Juan, Puerto Rico

- Henry Klumb House
- Residencia de Señoritas Building
- Roosevelt Tower (La Torre) and The Quadrangle

=== University of Puerto Rico at Mayagüez ===
In Mayagüez, Puerto Rico

- Casa Solariega de Jose De Diego
- José de Diego Building

=== Pratt Institute ===
In Brooklyn, New York

- Pratt Institute Historic District

=== Princeton University ===
In Princeton, New Jersey

- Nassau Hall (NHL)
- Joseph Henry House (NHL)
- President's House (Princeton) (NHL)
- Princeton Battlefield (NHL)
- Prospect (Princeton) (NHL)

=== Principia College ===
In Elsah, Illinois

- Principia College Historic District (NHL) had 13 Bernard Maybeck buildings, 11 of which are still standing and in use

=== Randolph College ===
In Lynchburg, Virginia

- Randolph-Macon College Buildings

=== Randolph–Macon Woman's College ===
In Lynchburg, Virginia

- Main Hall, Randolph-Macon Women's College

=== Red River Valley University ===
In Wahpeton, North Dakota

=== Rensselaer Polytechnic Institute ===
In Troy, New York

- Old Troy Hospital (aka West Hall)
- W. & L. E. Gurley Building (NHL)
- Winslow Chemical Laboratory

=== Roanoke College ===
In Salem, Virginia

- Main Campus Complex, Roanoke College

=== Rollins College ===
	Landmark name	Image	Date listed	Location	City or Town	Summary
1	Knowles Memorial Chapel		December 8, 1997	1000 Holt Avenue; 28°35′32″N 81°20′54″W	Winter Park, Florida	

=== Rockefeller University ===
In New York, NY has 1 NHL:

- Founder's Hall, The Rockefeller University (NHL)

=== Roosevelt University ===
In Chicago, Illinois

- Auditorium Building (NHL)

=== Rutgers University ===
In New Brunswick, New Jersey

	Name on the Register	Image	Date listed	Location	City or town	Description
1	James Bishop House	James Bishop House	July 12, 1976 (#76001162)	College Avenue; 40°30′11″N 74°27′00″W	New Brunswick	Built 1852.
2	Demarest House	Demarest House	August 10, 1977 (#77000884)	542 George Street; 40°30′07″N 74°26′47″W	New Brunswick	Built in 1867, now the Center on Violence Against Women and Children, Rutgers University
3	Levi D. Jarrard House	Levi D. Jarrard House	April 22, 1982 (#82003282)	George St., Douglass College campus 40°29′11″N 74°26′16″W	New Brunswick	Known as College Hall, Douglass Campus, Rutgers University
4	New Jersey Hall	New Jersey Hall	February 24, 1975 (#75001144)	73 Hamilton Street; 40°29′58″N 74°26′51″W	New Brunswick	Located on the Voorhees Mall
5	Old Queens, Rutgers University	Old Queens, Rutgers University	May 11, 1976 (#76001164)	83 Somerset Street; 40°29′56″N 74°26′47″W	New Brunswick	Built 1809–1825. Oldest building at Rutgers University, also part of Queens Campus
6	Queens Campus, Rutgers University	Queens Campus, Rutgers University	July 2, 1973 (#73001113)	Bounded by College Avenue and George, Hamilton, and Somerset Streets; 40°29′54″N 74°26′46″W	New Brunswick	Includes Old Queens (1809), Van Nest Hall (1845), Daniel S. Schanck Observatory (1865), Geology Hall (1872), Kirkpatrick Chapel (1873), Winants Hall (1890).
7	Rutgers Preparatory School	Rutgers Preparatory School	July 18, 1975 (#75001145)	101 Somerset Street; 40°29′52″N 74°26′50″W	New Brunswick	Designed and built by architect Nicholas Wyckoff, former home (1830–1963) of Rutgers Preparatory School, the oldest independent school in New Jersey, established 1766. Building now known as Alexander Johnston Hall, Rutgers University.
8	Wood Lawn	Wood Lawn	March 8, 1978 (#78001772)	Douglass Campus; 40°28′54″N 74°25′59″W	New Brunswick	Used by the Eagleton Institute of Politics

=== University of the Sacred Heart ===
In San Juan, Puerto Rico

- Administration Building and chapel

=== Salem International University ===
In Salem, West Virginia

	Name on the Register	Image	Date listed	Location	City or town	Description
1	Salem College Administration Building	Salem College Administration Building	March 30, 1989 (#89000184)	223 W. Main St. 39°17′01″N 80°34′02″W	Salem	

=== San Diego State University ===
In San Diego, California

- Aztec Bowl
- San Diego State College

=== Santa Fe College ===
In Gainesville, Florida

- Old Bradford County Courthouse

=== Sheldon Jackson College ===
In Sitka, Alaska(NHL)

=== Shippensburg University ===
In Shippensburg, Pennsylvania

- Cumberland Valley State Normal School Historic District

=== St. Ambrose University ===
	Landmark name	Image	Date listed	Location	City or Town	Summary
1	Ambrose Hall		July 7, 1983	518 W. Locust St. 41°32′20″N 90°34′51″W	Davenport, Iowa	
2	Alumni House		July 7, 1983	1527 Brady Street; 41°32′09″N 90°34′26″W	Davenport, Iowa	Listed as the F.H. Miller House.

=== St. Augustine's University ===
In Raleigh, North Carolina

- St. Augustine's College Campus

=== St. Benedict's College ===
In St. Joseph, Minnesota

- St. Benedict's Convent and College Historic District

=== St. Catherine University ===
In Saint Paul, Minnesota

- Derham Hall and Our Lady of Victory Chapel

=== Saint Joseph College of Florida ===
In Jensen Beach, Florida

- See Florida Institute of Technology (Jensen Beach Campus) above

=== St. Lawrence University ===
In Canton, New York

- Herring–Cole Hall, St. Lawrence University
- Richardson Hall, St. Lawrence University
- St. Lawrence University – Old Campus Historic District

=== St. Olaf College ===
In Northfield, Minnesota

- Old Main, St. Olaf College
- Steensland Library

=== St. Edward's University ===
In Austin, Texas

- St. Edward's University Main Building and Holy Cross Dormitory

=== Saint Paul's College ===
In Lawrenceville, Virginia

- Saint Paul's College

=== Sam Houston State University ===
In Huntsville, Texas

- Sam Houston House

=== Scripps College ===
In Claremont, California

- Scripps College for Women

=== Seton Hall University ===
In South Orange, New Jersey

- Eugene V. Kelly Carriage House

=== Shaw University ===
In Raleigh, North Carolina

- Estey Hall

=== Simmons College of Kentucky ===
In Louisville, Kentucky

- Municipal College Campus, Simmons University

=== Simpson College ===
In Indianola, Iowa

- Science Hall

=== Smith College ===
In Northampton, Massachusetts

- Smith Alumnae Gymnasium

=== Snow College ===
In Ephraim, Utah

- Snow Academy Building

=== South College ===
In Knoxville, Tennessee

- Knoxville Business College

=== University of South Carolina ===
In Columbia, South Carolina

- Old Campus District

=== South Georgia College ===
In McRae, Georgia

- South Georgia College Administration Building

=== Southeastern Louisiana University ===
In Hammond, Louisiana

- McGehee Hall, Southeastern Louisiana State University

=== Southern Methodist University ===
In Dallas, Texas

- Dallas Hall

=== Southern Utah University ===
In Cedar City, Utah

- Old Main and Science Buildings

=== Southwestern University ===
In Georgetown, Texas

- Southwestern University Administration Building and Mood Hall

=== University of Southern Maine ===
In Gorham, Maine

- McLellan House

=== University of Southern Mississippi ===
In Hattiesburg, Mississippi

- The University of Southern Mississippi Historic District

=== Spring Hill College ===
	Site name	Image	Date listed	Location	City	Summary
1	Sodality Chapel		October 18, 1984	Spring Hill College30°41′30″N 88°8′13″W	Mobile, Alabama	
2	Spring Hill College Quadrangle		August 17, 1973	4307 Old Shell Rd. 30°41′35″N 88°8′13″W	Mobile, Alabama	This grouping of structures on the campus of Spring Hill College includes the Renaissance Revival style Administration Building, completed in 1869, and the Gothic Revival style St. Joseph's Chapel, completed in 1910.

=== Stanford University ===
In Palo Alto, California

- Hanna–Honeycomb House

=== Stephens College ===
In Columbia, Missouri

- Senior Hall
- Stephens College South Campus Historic District

=== Stetson University ===
In DeLand, Florida

- DeLand Hall
- Stetson University Campus Historic District

=== Stevens Institute of Technology ===
In Hoboken, New Jersey

- Morton Memorial Laboratory of Chemistry
- Edwin A. Stevens Hall
- William Hall Walker Gymnasium

=== Storer College ===
In Harpers Ferry, West Virginia

The entire campus of the now closed college is a contributing property to the Harpers Ferry National Historical Park.

=== Susquehanna University ===
In Pennsylvania

- Selinsgrove Hall and Seibert Hall

=== Swarthmore College ===
In Pennsylvania

- Benjamin West Birthplace (NHL)

=== Syracuse University ===
In Syracuse, NY has 15:

- Crouse College, Syracuse University
- Hall of Languages, Syracuse University
- Pi Chapter House of Psi Upsilon Fraternity
- Syracuse University-Comstock Tract Buildings

=== Talladega College ===
	Site name	Image	Date listed	Location	City or Town	Summary
1	Swayne Hall		December 2, 1974	Talladega College campus 33°25′46″N 86°7′3″W	Talladega, Alabama	
2	Talladega College Historic District		August 23, 1990	Junction of Battle St. and Martin Luther King Dr. 33°26′0″N 86°6′51″W	Talladega, Alabama	

=== University of Tampa ===
	Landmark name	Image	Date listed	Location	City or Town	Summary
1	Old School House		December 4, 1974	Lafayette Street on the University of Tampa campus 27°56′48″N 82°27′55″W	Tampa, Florida	
2	Tampa Bay Hotel		December 5, 1972	401 West Kennedy Boulevard; 27°56′46″N 82°27′51″W	Tampa, Florida	

=== University of Tennessee ===
- University of Tennessee Agriculture Farm Mound (address restricted, Knox County)

=== University of Tennessee at Chattanooga ===
In Chattanooga, Tennessee

- Clarence T. Jones Observatory

=== Tennessee Technological University ===
In Cookeville, Tennessee

- Henderson Hall

=== Texas Tech University ===
In Lubbock, Texas

- Texas Technological College Dairy Barn
- Texas Technological College Historic District

=== University of Texas at Austin ===
In Austin, Texas

- Battle Hall

=== Tougaloo College ===
In Madison County, Mississippi

- Tougaloo College
- Robert O. Wilder Building

=== Transylvania University ===
In Lexington, Kentucky

- Old Morrison (NHL)

=== Tulane University ===
In New Orleans, Louisiana

- Tulane University of Louisiana

=== Tuskegee University ===
	Site name	Image	Date listed	Location	City	Summary
1	Grey Columns		January 11, 1980	399 Old Montgomery Rd. 32°25′35″N 85°42′18″W	Tuskegee, Alabama	
2	Tuskegee Institute National Historic Site		October 15, 1966	1 mile northwest of Tuskegee on U.S. Route 80; 32°25′45″N 85°42′25″W	Tuskegee, Alabama	

=== Union College ===
In Schenectady, NY has 1 NHL:

- Nott Memorial Hall (NHL)

=== United States Military Academy grounds and facilities ===
In Highlands, New York

- United States Military Academy (NHL)

=== Upper Iowa University ===
In Fayette, Iowa

- College Hall

=== University of Utah ===
In Salt Lake City

- Carlson Hall
- Fort Douglas (NHLD)
- University of Utah Circle

=== Utah State University ===
In Logan, Utah

- Home Economics/Commons Building
- Old Main, Utah State University
- Women's Residence Hall

=== Utah Tech University ===
In St. George, Utah

- Main Building of Dixie College

=== Valparaiso University ===
In Valparaiso, Indiana

- Heritage Hall (Valparaiso University)

=== Vanderbilt University ===
In Nashville, Tennessee

- Gymnasium, Vanderbilt University
- Mechanical Engineering Hall, Vanderbilt University
- George Peabody College for Teachers (NHL)
- Dyer Observatory in Brentwood, Tennessee

=== Virginia Commonwealth University ===
In Richmond, Virginia

- Hunt–Sitterding House
- Scott House
- William Beers House
- Egyptian Building
- The Putney Houses
- William H. Grant House
- Benjamin Watkins Leigh House

=== Vassar College ===
In NY has 2 NHLs:

- Main Building (Vassar College) (NHL)
- Vassar College Observatory (NHL)

=== Virginia Intermont College ===
In Bristol, Virginia

- Virginia Intermont College

=== Virginia Military Institute ===
In Lexington, Virginia

- Barracks, Virginia Military Institute (NHL)
- Virginia Military Institute Historic District (NHL)

=== Virginia Union University ===
In Richmond, Virginia

- Virginia Union University

=== Virginia State University ===
In Ettrick, Virginia

- Vawter Hall and Old President's House

=== Virginia Tech ===
In Blacksburg, Virginia

- Solitude

=== Virginia University of Lynchburg ===
In Lynchburg, Virginia

- Virginia University of Lynchburg

=== University of Virginia ===
In Charlottesville, Virginia

- Clark Hall, University of Virginia
- Leander McCormick Observatory (on Mount Jefferson)
- The Rotunda (University of Virginia) (NHL)
- University Of Virginia Historic District (NHLD)

=== Voorhees University ===
In Denmark, South Carolina

- Voorhees College Historic District

=== Wartburg College ===
In Waverly, Iowa

- Old Main

=== Washington College ===
In Chestertown, Maryland

- Middle, East and West Halls

=== Washington University in St. Louis ===
In St. Louis, Missouri

- Washington University Hilltop Campus Historic District (NHL)

=== Washington and Lee University ===
In Lexington, Virginia

- Lee Chapel (NHL)
- Washington and Lee University Historic District (NHLD)

=== Wayne State University ===
In Detroit, Michigan

- Wayne State University Buildings

=== Wells College ===
In Aurora, Cayuga County, New York

- Aurora Village-Wells College Historic District

=== Wesleyan College ===
In Macon, Georgia

- Wesleyan College Historic District

=== Wesleyan University ===
In Middletown, CT has 2 NHLs and several other NRHPs:

- Alsop House (NHL)
- Coite–Hubbard House (aka President's house)
- Edward Augustus Russell House (aka Kappa Nu Kappa House)
- Samuel Wadsworth Russell House (NHL)

(Wesleyan University may also own some properties in Broad Street Historic District or other historic districts in Middletown).

=== West Chester University ===
In West Chester, Pennsylvania

- West Chester State College Quadrangle Historic District

=== West Liberty University ===
In West Liberty, West Virginia

	Name on the Register	Image	Date listed	Location	City or town	Description
1	Shaw Hall, West Liberty State College	Shaw Hall, West Liberty State College	December 27, 1996 (#96001528)	Bethany Pike, approximately 1.25 miles south of junction with Locust Grove Rd. 40°09′56″N 80°36′07″W	West Liberty	
2	Shotwell Hall, West Liberty State College	Shotwell Hall, West Liberty State College	December 27, 1996 (#96001529)	Bethany Pike, approximately 1.25 miles south of junction with Locust Grove Rd. 40°09′47″N 80°36′10″W	West Liberty	

=== West Virginia State University ===
In Institute, West Virginia

	Name on the Register	Image	Date listed	Location	City or town	Description
1	Canty House	Canty House	September 23, 1988 (#88001587)	WV 25; 38°22′57″N 81°45′48″W	Institute	
2	East Hall	East Hall	September 26, 1988 (#88001585)	West Quadrangle, West Virginia State University; 38°22′44″N 81°46′07″W	Institute	

=== West Virginia University ===
In Morgantown, West Virginia

	Name on the Register	Image	Date listed	Location	City or town	Description
1	Men's Hall	Men's Hall	February 5, 1990 (#89002309)	Prospect and High Sts. 39°37′59″N 79°57′10″W	Morgantown	
2	Elizabeth Moore Hall	Elizabeth Moore Hall	December 19, 1985 (#85003208)	University Ave. 39°38′06″N 79°57′20″W	Morgantown	
3	Oglebay Hall	Oglebay Hall	December 19, 1985 (#85003207)	University Ave. 39°38′14″N 79°57′16″W	Morgantown	
4	Stalnaker Hall	Stalnaker Hall	December 19, 1985 (#85003205)	Maiden Ln. 39°38′08″N 79°57′11″W	Morgantown	
5	Stewart Hall	Stewart Hall	June 25, 1980 (#80004034)	West Virginia University campus 39°38′03″N 79°57′16″W	Morgantown	
6	Woodburn Circle	Woodburn Circle	December 4, 1974 (#74002014)	University Ave., West Virginia University; 39°38′09″N 79°57′35″W	Morgantown	

=== West Virginia University Institute of Technology ===
In Montgomery, West Virginia

	Name on the Register	Image	Date listed	Location	City or town	Description
1	Main Building	Main Building	June 25, 1980 (#80004019)	West Virginia University Institute of Technology campus 38°10′45″N 81°19′31″W	Montgomery	

=== West Virginia Wesleyan College ===
In Buckhannon, West Virginia

	Name on the Register	Image	Date listed	Location	City or town	Description
1	Agnes Howard Hall	Agnes Howard Hall	August 18, 1983 (#83003253)	West Virginia Wesleyan College campus 38°59′22″N 80°13′13″W	Buckhannon	

=== Western Carolina University ===
In Cullowhee, North Carolina

- Joyner Building

=== Western Illinois University ===
In Macomb, Illinois

- Western Illinois State Normal School Building

=== Westchester Community College ===
In Valhalla, New York

- John Hartford House (NHL)

=== Western Kentucky University ===
In Bowling Green, Kentucky

- Henry Hardin Cherry Hall
- Van Meter Hall
- Western Kentucky University Heating Plant

=== Western Michigan University ===
In Kalamazoo, Michigan

- East Hall
- Western State Normal School Historic District

=== Westminster College, Missouri ===
In Fulton, Missouri

- Westminster College Gymnasium (NHL)

=== Westminster University (Utah) ===
In Salt Lake City

- Converse Hall

=== Willamette University ===
In Salem, Oregon

- Waller Hall

=== College of William and Mary ===
In Williamsburg, Virginia

- Wren Building (NHL)

=== Wilson College ===
In Chambersburg, Pennsylvania

- Wilson College

=== Winthrop University ===
In Rock Hill, South Carolina

- Tillman Hall
- Winthrop College Historic District
- Withers Building

=== University of Wisconsin–La Crosse ===
In La Crosse, Wisconsin

- LaCrosse State Teachers College Training School Building
- Main Hall/La Crosse State Normal School
- Physical Education Building/La Crosse State Normal School

=== University of Wisconsin–Madison ===
In Madison, Wisconsin has 16 (4 NHLs):

- Agricultural Chemistry Building
- Agricultural Dean's House
- Agricultural Engineering Building
- Agricultural Heating Station
- Agriculture Hall
- Bascom Hill Historic District
- Hiram Smith Hall and Annex
- Horticulture and Agricultural Physics and Soil Science Building
- Lathrop Hall
- North Hall, University of Wisconsin (NHL)
- Old U.S. Forest Products Laboratory
- Stock Pavilion
- University of Wisconsin Armory and Gymnasium (NHL)
- University of Wisconsin Dairy Barn (NHL)
- University of Wisconsin Field House
- University of Wisconsin Science Hall (NHL)

=== University of Wisconsin–Oshkosh ===
In Oshkosh, Wisconsin

- Oshkosh State Normal School Historic District
- Oviatt House
- William E. Pollock Residence

=== Wofford College ===
In Spartanburg, South Carolina

- Wofford College Historic District

=== College of Wooster ===
In Wooster, Ohio

- College of Wooster

=== Yale University ===
In New Haven, Connecticut has 4 NHLs, and an NRHP historic district:

- Connecticut Hall (NHL)
- James Dwight Dana House (NHL)
- Hillhouse Avenue Historic District
- Othniel C. Marsh House (NHL)
- Yale Bowl (NHL)

Grove Street Cemetery and Mory's, both listed on the NRHP, are on the campus but are independent of Yale.

=== Yankton College ===
In Yankton, South Dakota

- Yankton College Conservatory
- Yankton College Historic District

=== Young Harris College ===
In Young Harris, Georgia

- Young Harris College Historic District

== National Historic Landmarks by state ==
=== Alabama ===
- Foster Auditorium, University of Alabama
- Swayne Hall, Talladega College
- Tuskegee Airmen National Historic Site, Tuskegee, Alabama
- Tuskegee Institute National Historic Site, Tuskegee University

=== California ===
- Gilman Hall Room 307

=== Florida ===
- Mary McLeod Bethune Home
- Tampa Bay Hotel

=== Kentucky ===
- Lincoln Hall, Berea College

=== Indiana ===
- Eleutherian College Classroom and Chapel Building
- Hinkle Fieldhouse

=== Illinois ===
- S.R. Crown Hall
- George Herbert Jones Laboratory
- Morrow Plots
- Old Main, Knox College
- Principia College Historic District
- University of Illinois Observatory

=== Iowa ===
- Iowa Old Capitol Building

=== Massachusetts ===
- Massachusetts Hall, Harvard University
- Memorial Hall (Harvard University)
- Old Harvard Yard
- Sever Hall
- University Hall (Harvard University)

=== Mississippi ===
- Oakland Memorial Chapel

=== Missouri ===
- Sanborn Field and Soil Erosion Plots
- Westminster College Gymnasium

=== New Jersey ===
- Joseph Henry House, Princeton University
- Nassau Hall, Princeton University
- President's House (Princeton), Princeton University
- Princeton Battlefield, Princeton University
- Prospect (Princeton), Princeton University

=== New York ===
==== New York State (excluding NYC) ====
- W. & L. E. Gurley Building
- Morrill Hall
- Main Building (Vassar College)
- Vassar College Observatory
- Nott Memorial Hall
- Elihu Root House
- United States Military Academy

==== New York City only ====
- Cooper Union
- Low Memorial Library
- Philosophy Hall
- Pupin Hall
- Founder's Hall, The Rockefeller University

=== Ohio ===
- Cincinnati Observatory

=== Pennsylvania ===
- Old West, Dickinson College
- Grey Towers Castle
- Old Library

=== South Carolina ===
- Chappelle Administration Building, Allen University
- Fort Hill, Clemson University
- College of Charleston Historic District, College of Charleston

=== West Virginia ===
- Old Main, Bethany College
- Alexander Campbell Mansion
