= Agnes Howard Hall =

- U.S. National Register of Historic Places
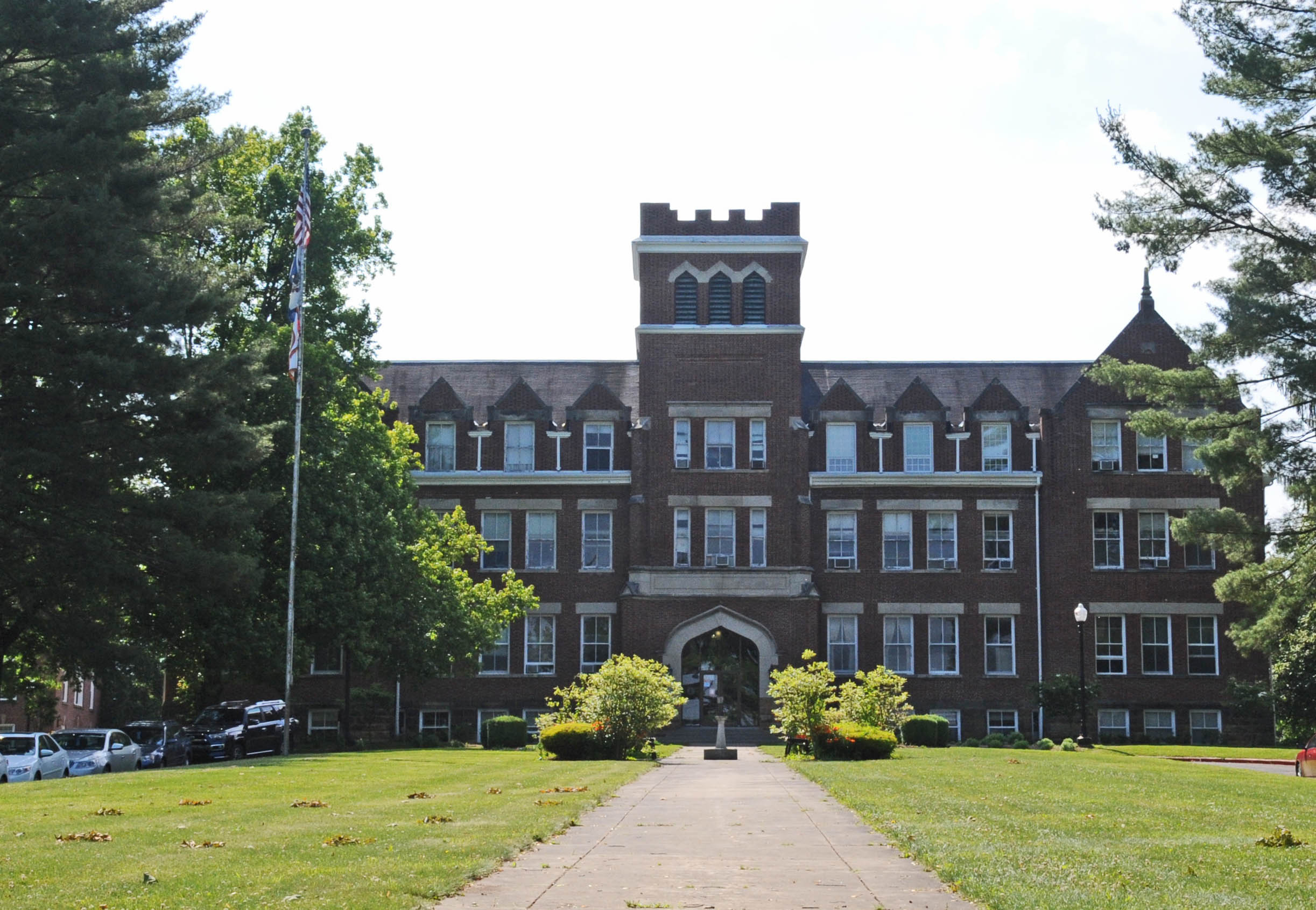

- Location within West Virginia Location within the United States
- Location: West Virginia Wesleyan College Campus, Buckhannon, West Virginia
- Coordinates: 38°59′22″N 80°13′13″W
- Area: 1 acre (0.40 ha)
- Architect: Geisy, M.F.; Reger, Carl
- Architectural style: Late Victorian
- NRHP reference No.: 83003253
- Added to NRHP: August 18, 1983

Agnes Howard Hall, also known as Ladies Hall or "Aggie," is a historic dormitory building located on the campus of West Virginia Wesleyan College at Buckhannon, Upshur County, West Virginia. It was built in 1895, and is a five-story brick building primarily used as a residence hall. It features an eclectic design with three tower caps and multiple hip roofs. An addition was completed in 1929 and extensive renovations occurred in 1952. It contains 77 sleeping rooms and 26 main bathrooms, along with office areas for residence assistants, lounge areas, kitchen facilities, and maintenance storage rooms. It was the first dormitory constructed at West Virginia Wesleyan College and the oldest on campus. It was officially named Agnes Howard Hall in 1920, in memory of a young woman who had died while a student at Wesleyan.

Picture shown here is not Agnes Howard Hall. It is the Administration Building

It was listed on the National Register of Historic Places in 1983.

== See also ==
- National Register of Historic Places listings at colleges and universities in the United States
