= Stalnaker Hall =

- U.S. National Register of Historic Places
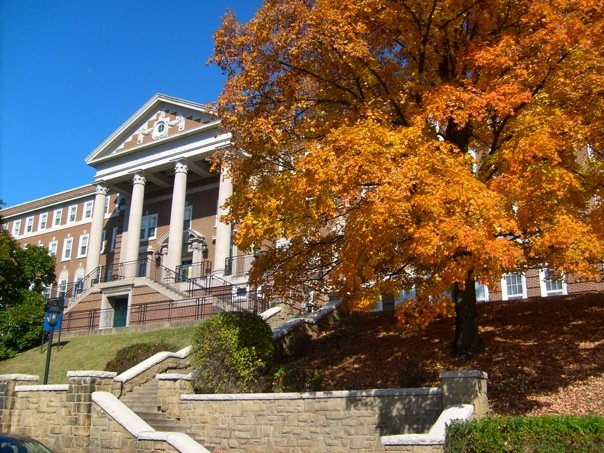
- Stalnaker Hall, November 2008

- Location within West Virginia Location within the United States
- Location: Maiden Ln., Morgantown, West Virginia
- Coordinates: 39°38′8″N 79°57′11″W
- Area: 1.5 acres (0.61 ha)
- Built: 1918
- Architectural style: Classical Revival
- MPS: West Virginia University Neo-Classical Revival Buildings TR
- NRHP reference No.: 85003205
- Added to NRHP: December 19, 1985

Stalnaker Hall, also known as Woman's Hall, is a historic dormitory building associated with the West Virginia University, located in Morgantown, Monongalia County, West Virginia. Constructed in 1918, it is a three-story, brick building on a high basement, with Classical Revival detailing. Two-story additions were built between 1935 and 1939. The front facade features four Corinthian order columns that support a pediment with decorative concrete work. It was named for Elizabeth Stalnaker, professor of philosophy and psychology in the early 20th century.

It was listed on the National Register of Historic Places in 1985.

== See also ==
- National Register of Historic Places listings at colleges and universities in the United States
