= Men's Hall =

- U.S. National Register of Historic Places
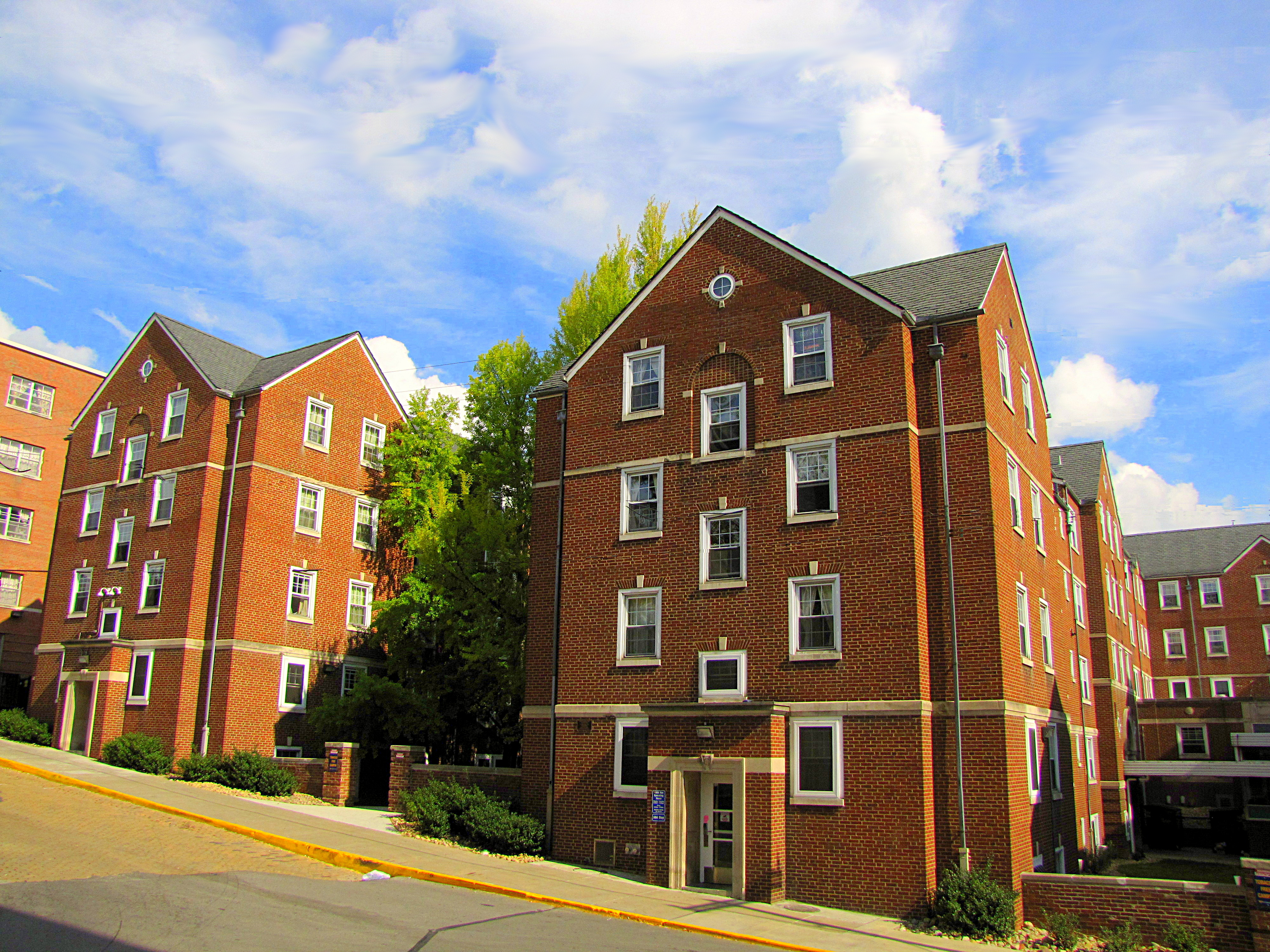

- Location within West Virginia Location within the United States
- Location: Prospect and High Sts., Morgantown, West Virginia
- Coordinates: 39°37′59″N 79°57′10″W
- Area: 0.8 acres (0.32 ha)
- Built: 1935
- Built by: Baker & Coombs
- Architect: Warne-Tucker-Silling
- Architectural style: Late 19th And 20th Century Revivals
- MPS: West Virginia University MPS
- NRHP reference No.: 89002309
- Added to NRHP: February 5, 1990

Men's Hall, also known as Boreman Hall South, is a historic dormitory associated with the West Virginia University and located at Morgantown, Monongalia County, West Virginia. It was built in 1935, and is a five-story, E-shaped red brick building with Classical Revival detailing. It sits on a reinforced concrete foundation and has a slate covered gable roof. When documented in 1989, it housed 350 students in 329 rooms. It was the first dormitory built for men on campus. Its construction was funded in part by the Works Progress Administration. During World War II, it was used as an Air Force barracks.

It was listed on the National Register of Historic Places in 1989.

== See also ==
- National Register of Historic Places listings at colleges and universities in the United States
