= Residencia de Señoritas Building =

- Residencia de Señoritas Universidad de Puerto Rico, Río Piedras
- U.S. National Register of Historic Places
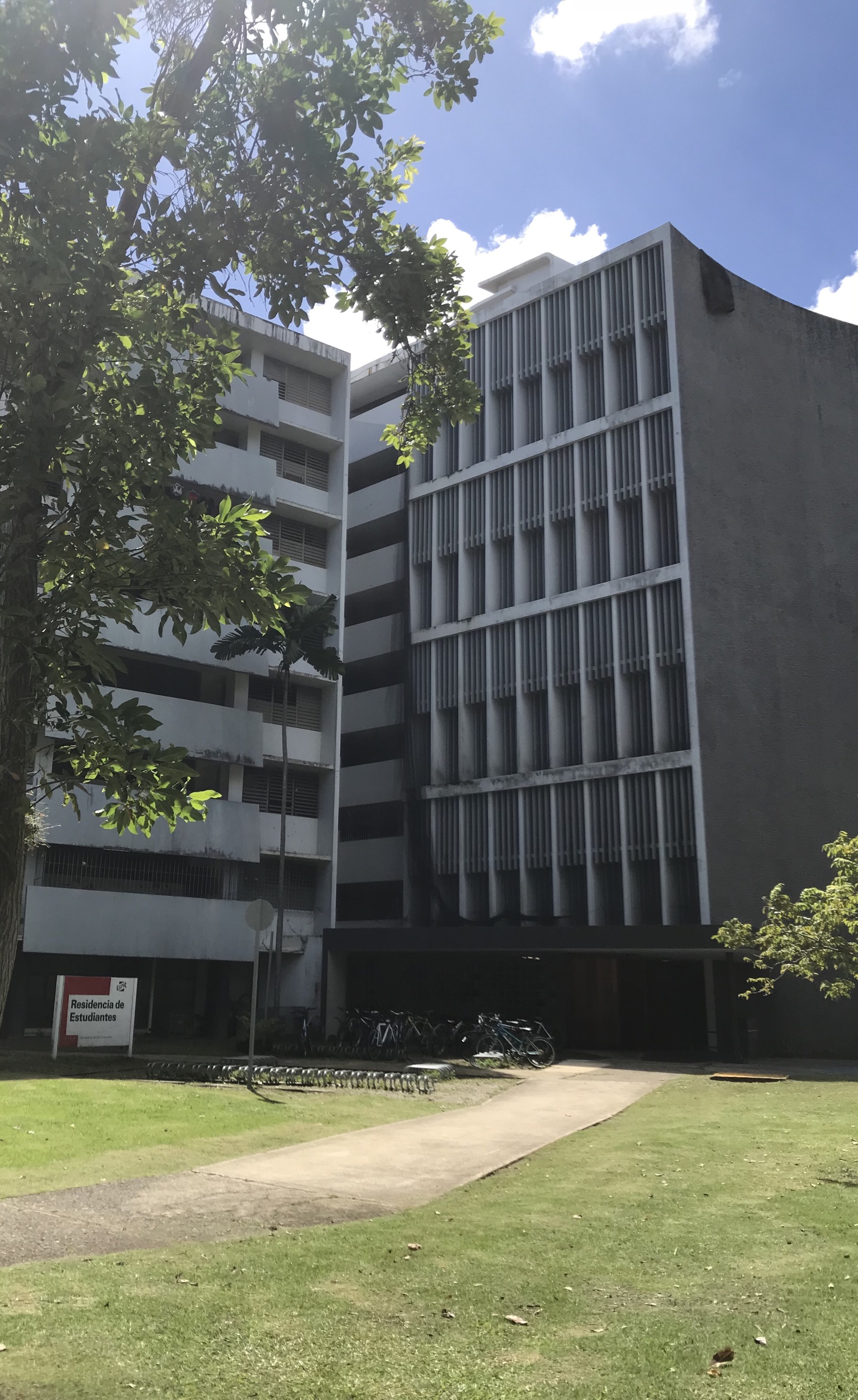
- The former residence hall in 2018

- Location within Puerto Rico
- Location: Near the intersection of Gándara and Barbosa Aves. University of Puerto Rico, Río Piedras Campus in San Juan, Puerto Rico
- Coordinates: 18°24′07″N 66°02′51″W
- Built: 1960
- Architect: Henry Klumb
- Architectural style: International
- NRHP reference No.: 100002695
- Added to NRHP: July 23, 2018

The Ladies Residence Hall of the University of Puerto Rico, Río Piedras (Spanish: Residencia de Señoritas de la Universidad de Puerto Rico, Río Piedras), is a historic Henry Klumb-designed building and former female dormitory of the University of Puerto Rico, Río Piedras campus (UPRRP). The Residencia de Señoritas was designed by famed architect Henry Klumb, a student of Frank Lloyd Wright, in the International Style. The building, commissioned by university chancellor Jaime Benítez Rexach, was constructed to accommodate a rapidly increasing student enrollment during a post-World War II developmental period induced by Operation Bootstrap (Operación Manos a la Obra). Although the residence hall was originally intended to be female-only, it became open to both male and female students. It was added to National Register of Historic Places in 2018 due to its distinction as a superb example of International mid-century modern style in Puerto Rico.

== See also ==
- Architecture of Puerto Rico
- Education in Puerto Rico
- University and college buildings listed on the National Register of Historic Places
