= Academy Hall (Pennsylvania Western University – Edinboro) =

- U.S. National Register of Historic Places
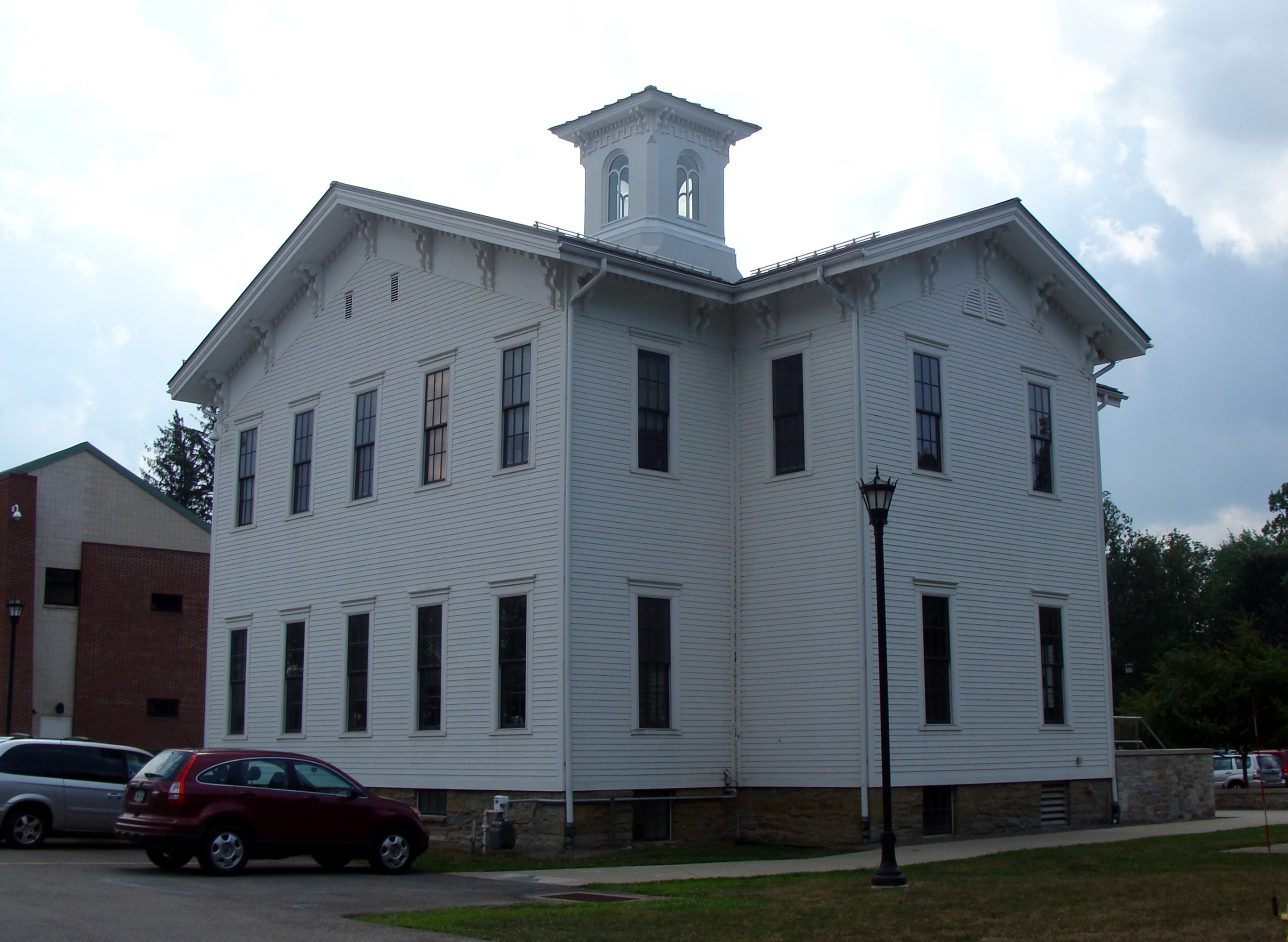

- Location within Pennsylvania Location within the United States
- Location: High and Normal Streets; Edinboro, Pennsylvania
- Coordinates: 41°52′19.3″N 80°7′41.2″W
- Built: 1857
- Architect: Nathaniel C. Austin
- Architectural style: Italianate
- NRHP reference No.: 06001055
- Added to NRHP: November 21, 2006

Academy Hall is an academic building on the campus of Pennsylvania Western University, Edinboro (PennWest Edinboro) in Edinboro, Pennsylvania. Originally named Austin Hall after its architect, the hall has since seen a variety of names that reflected its use at the time, including Literary Hall, Commercial Hall, and Music Hall. Built in 1857, Academy Hall is the oldest building at the university and the oldest normal school building in Pennsylvania. It was listed on the National Register of Historic Places in 2006.

== Design ==
Academy Hall is a two-story, Italianate-style structure located at the intersection of High and Normal Streets at PennWest Edinboro. The hall is 40 by 50 feet (10 m × 20 m), with 10 by 24 feet (3 m × 7 m) wings containing stairwells on the north and south sides. A cupola with a low, pyramidal roof and arched windows is perched atop the building. Beneath the brackets and dentil on the cupola is "Greek key fretwork".

The exterior of Academy Hall has remained unaltered since its construction, save for the addition of a new basement and foundation when it was moved in 1880, and the removal of its chimneys in 1885. During renovations in 2006 and 2007, parts of the first floor ceiling were removed to make way for the installation of a mezzanine. The cupola also functions as a skylight.

== History ==
In 1855, the citizens of Edinboro elected to establish an academy in the community, as the nearest secondary school at the time was in Waterford, 10 miles (20 km) away. The community applied for a charter in 1856, and succeeded in raising $3,000 for the purchasing of 1 acre (0.4 ha) and the construction of an academy building. The contract for the building was awarded to Nathaniel C. Austin, a local architect and carpenter. Austin Hall was completed in 1857 and was dedicated on December 14, 1857, the day before classes began. The school opened as Edinboro Academy.

During its construction, the Pennsylvania General Assembly passed the Normal School Act of 1857. The trustees of Edinboro Academy decided to pursue certification as a normal school under the act. An additional 9 acres (4 ha) were purchased and three more buildings erected: an assembly hall and two dormitories. The school officially became Northwest State Normal School on January 23, 1861. It was the second such school in Pennsylvania, the first being in Millersville.

Academy Hall was moved approximately 200 yards (200 m) northeast to its present location in 1880. It was renamed Literary Hall the same year when its second floor became used primarily by the school's literary societies. From 1912 to 1917, the hall was used by business courses and classes for "secretarial skills" and was called Commercial Hall. In 1917, the building was used by music students and was referred to as Music Hall. The college's alumni office took residence of Music Hall in 1965, and renamed it Academy Hall.

Academy Hall was left vacant in 1996. It underwent a $2.4 million restoration that was completed when it was rededicated on January 18, 2007 as part of the 150th anniversary celebration of the founding of the school. The hall now houses the university's admissions office.

== See also ==
- List of the oldest buildings in Pennsylvania
- National Register of Historic Places listings at colleges and universities in the United States
- National Register of Historic Places listings in Erie County, Pennsylvania

== Sources ==
- Erwin, Ericka (January 19, 2007). "Where it all began: EUP restores, rededicates historic building". Erie Times-News. pp. 1B–2B.
- Obringer, Dave (December 2005). National Register of Historic Places Registration: Pennsylvania SP Academy Hall. National Archives and Records Administration. (Downloading may be slow.)
