= William Beers House =

Historic house in Virginia, United States

- U.S. National Register of Historic Places
- Virginia Landmarks Register
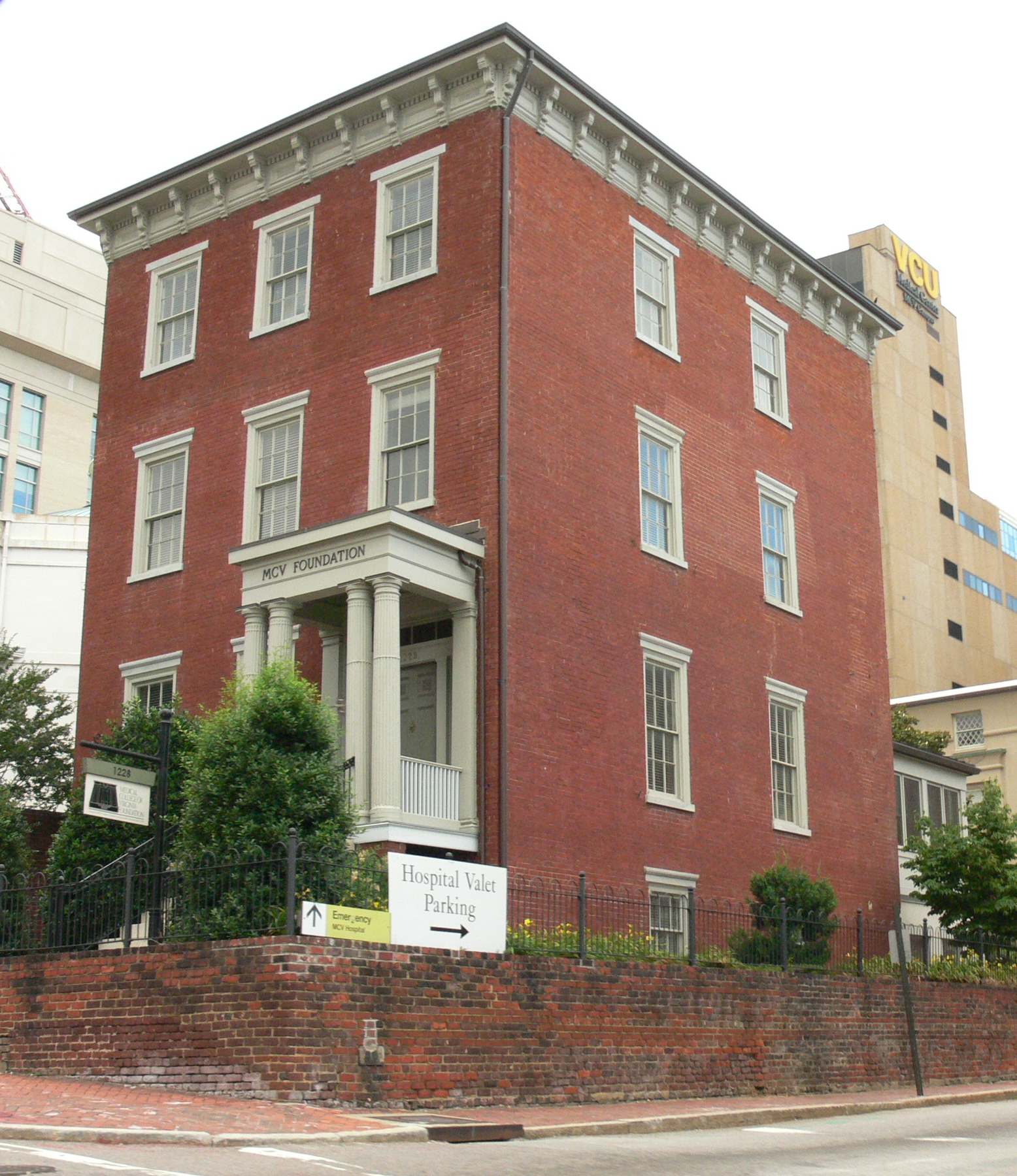
- Beers House, May 2011

- Location within Virginia Location within the United States
- Location: 1228 E. Broad St., Richmond, Virginia
- Coordinates: 37°32′19″N 77°25′48″W
- Area: 0.1 acres (0.040 ha)
- Built: 1839, 1860
- Built by: Beers, William
- Architectural style: Greek Revival, Italianate
- NRHP reference No.: 69000346
- VLR No.: 127-0356

Significant dates
- Added to NRHP: April 16, 1969
- Designated VLR: November 5, 1968

William Beers House, also known as the Beers House, is a historic home located in Richmond, Virginia. It was built in 1839, and is a three-story, three-bay, Greek Revival style brick dwelling crowned by an Italianate bracketed cornice and shallow hipped roof. It features an entrance with sidelights and pilasters framed by a porch containing coupled Greek Doric order columns. The house was enlarged to a full three stories in 1860. In 1965 the house was acquired by the Medical College of Virginia.

It was listed on the National Register of Historic Places in 1969.
