= Mary McLeod Bethune Home =

Historic house in Florida, United States

- U.S. National Register of Historic Places
- U.S. National Historic Landmark
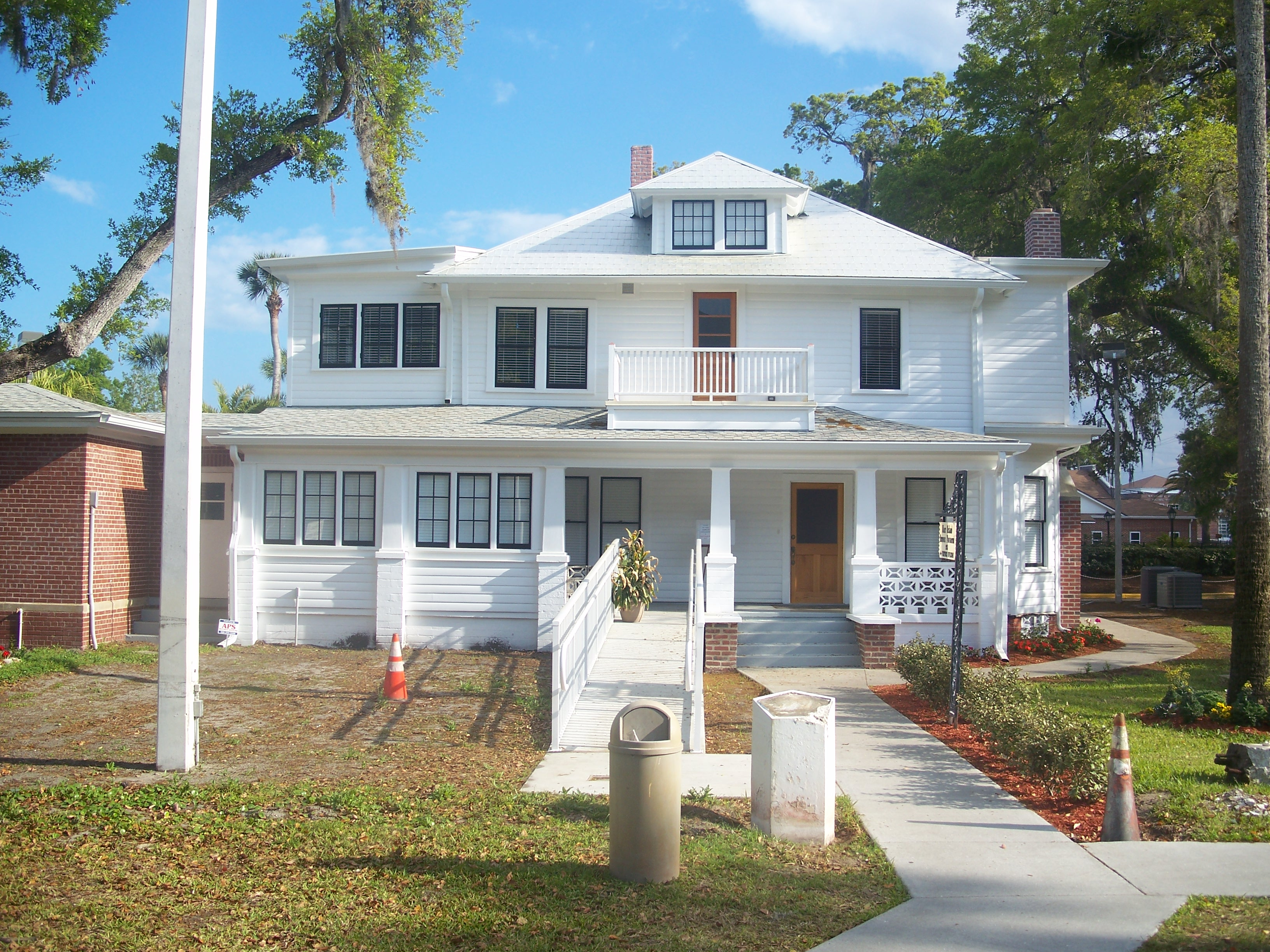
- The home in March, 2011

- Location within Volusia County Location within Florida Location within the United States
- Location: Daytona Beach, Florida
- Coordinates: 29°12′44.59″N 81°1′55.55″W
- Area: less than one acre
- Built: 1904
- NRHP reference No.: 74000655

Significant dates
- Added to NRHP: December 2, 1974
- Designated NHL: December 2, 1974

The Mary McLeod Bethune Home is a historic house on the campus of Bethune-Cookman University in Daytona Beach, Florida. Built in the early-1900s, it was home to Mary McLeod Bethune (1875–1955), a prominent African-American educator and civil rights leader, from 1913 until her death. It was designated a United States National Historic Landmark in 1974 It is now managed by the Mary McLeod Bethune Foundation as a historic house museum.

== Description and history ==
The Mary McLeod Bethune Home is located on the northeast side of the Bethune-Cookman campus, west of Doctor Martin Luther King Jr. Boulevard. It is a modest two-story frame house. Stylistically, it is an American Foursquare, with wings extending to the sides, and a hip-roof porch across the front. The house is not architecturally distinguished, and is typical of its period of construction. A brick addition, added in 1953, houses papers and documents of the Bethune Foundation.

The house was built about 1904–05, and was purchased by the Daytona Educational and Industrial Training School (now Bethune-Cookman University) in 1913 as the residence of Mary McLeod Bethune, the school's founder. Bethune, an African-American born to formerly enslaved parents, achieved nationwide notice for her success in establishing the school, and went on to play an important role in the advance of education and civil rights, particularly in the years between World War I and World War II. She was a good friend of Eleanor and Franklin Delano Roosevelt, and acted as an advisor to Roosevelt during his presidency in the 1930s.

The Mary McLeod Bethune Foundation was founded in 1953 to preserve her legacy, and is now responsible for the house's maintenance. It is normally open to the public as a historic house museum, interpreting Bethune's life. It closed in 2006 for significant $720,000 renovation and conservation, and reopened in April 2011.

== Gallery ==
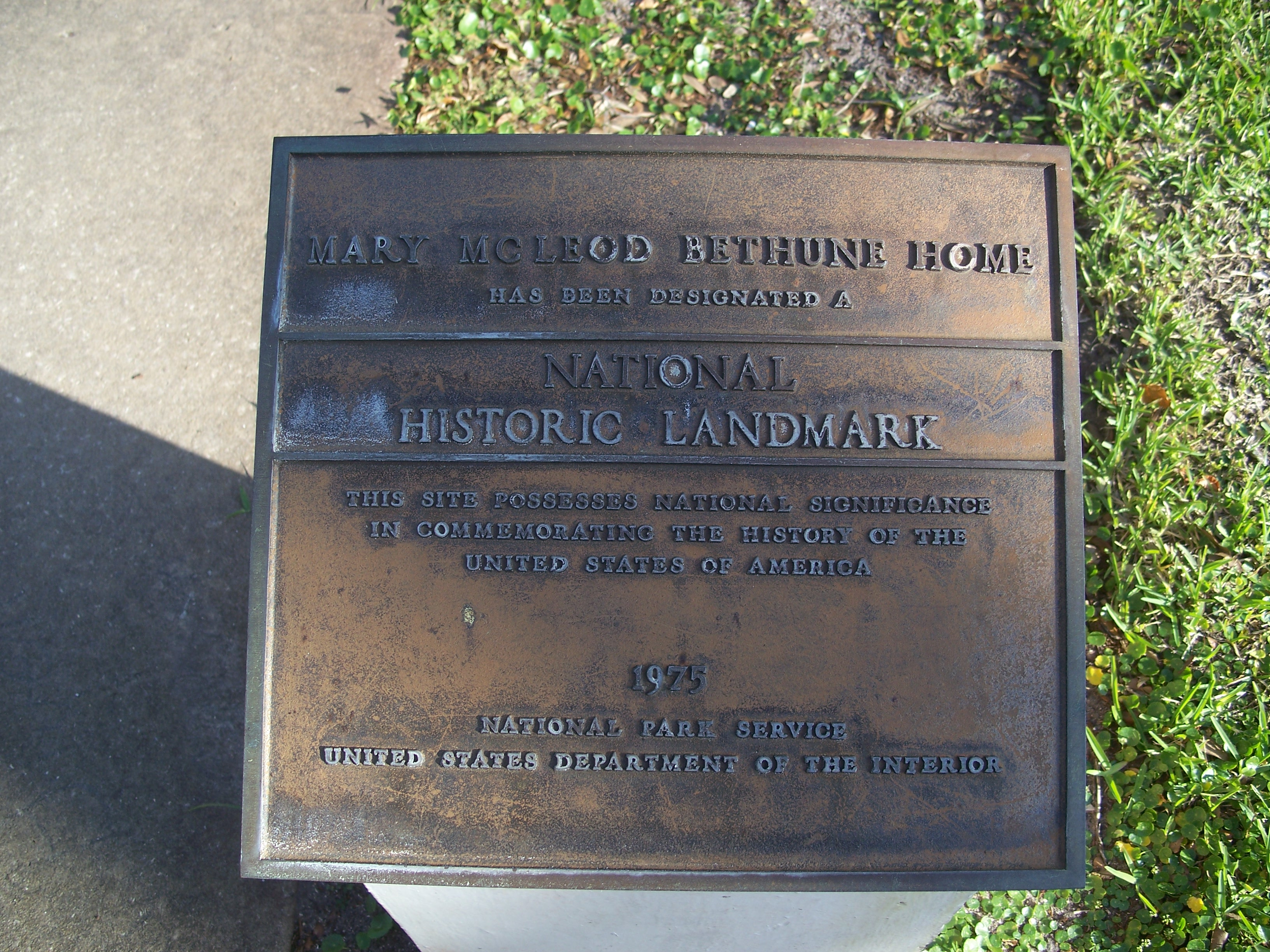
National Historic Landmark plaque

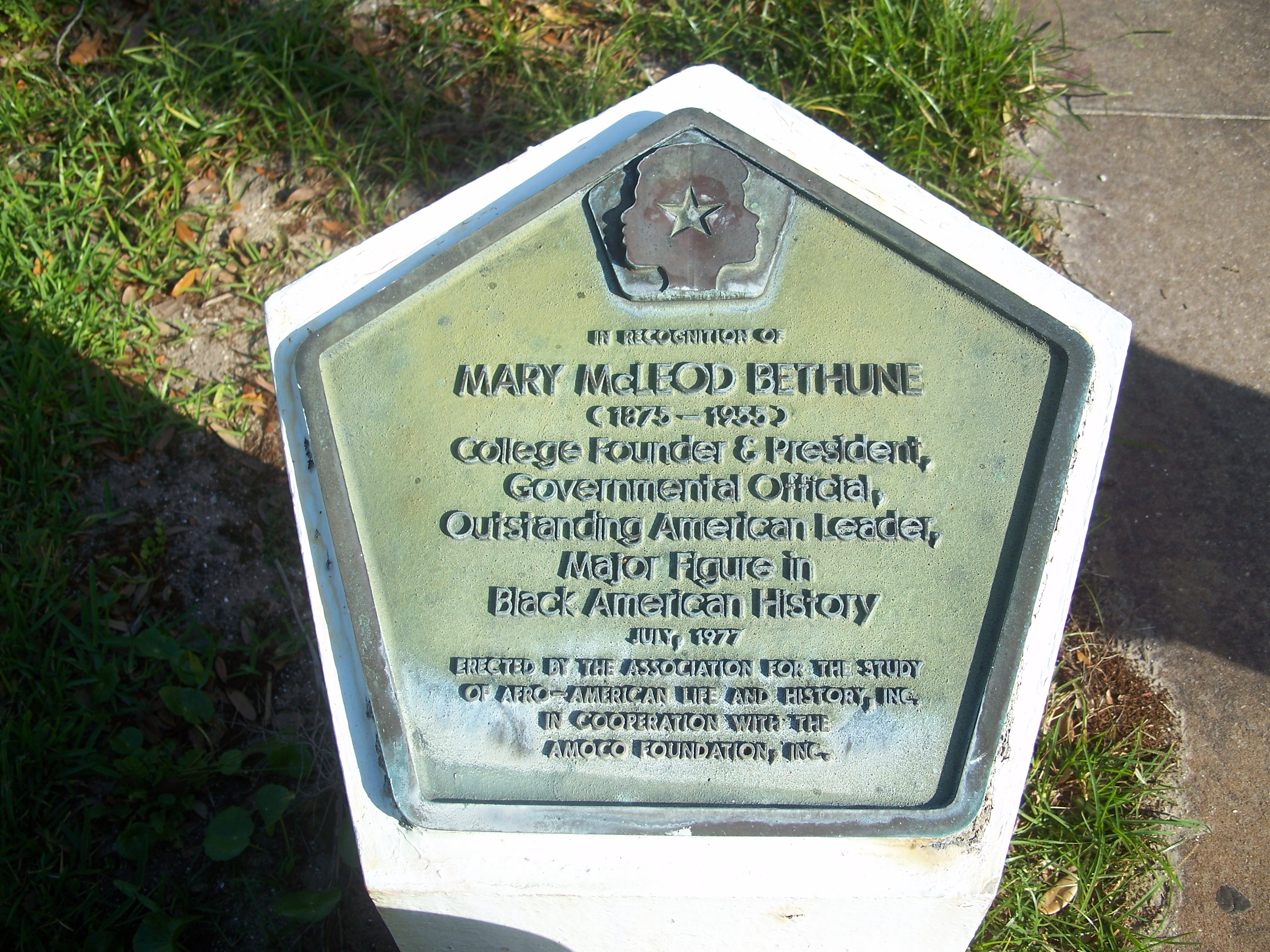
Commemorative plaque

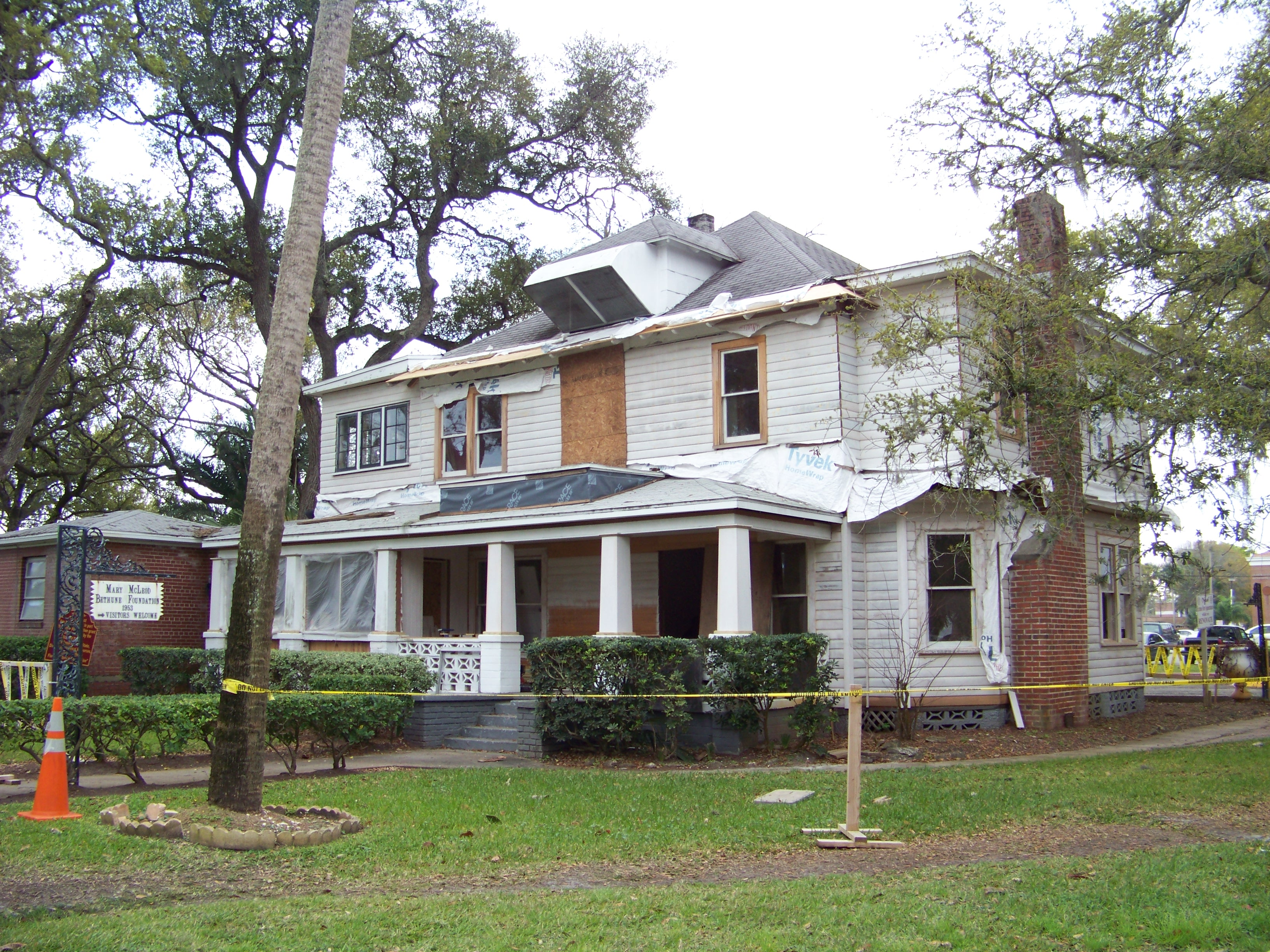
During renovations in March 2008

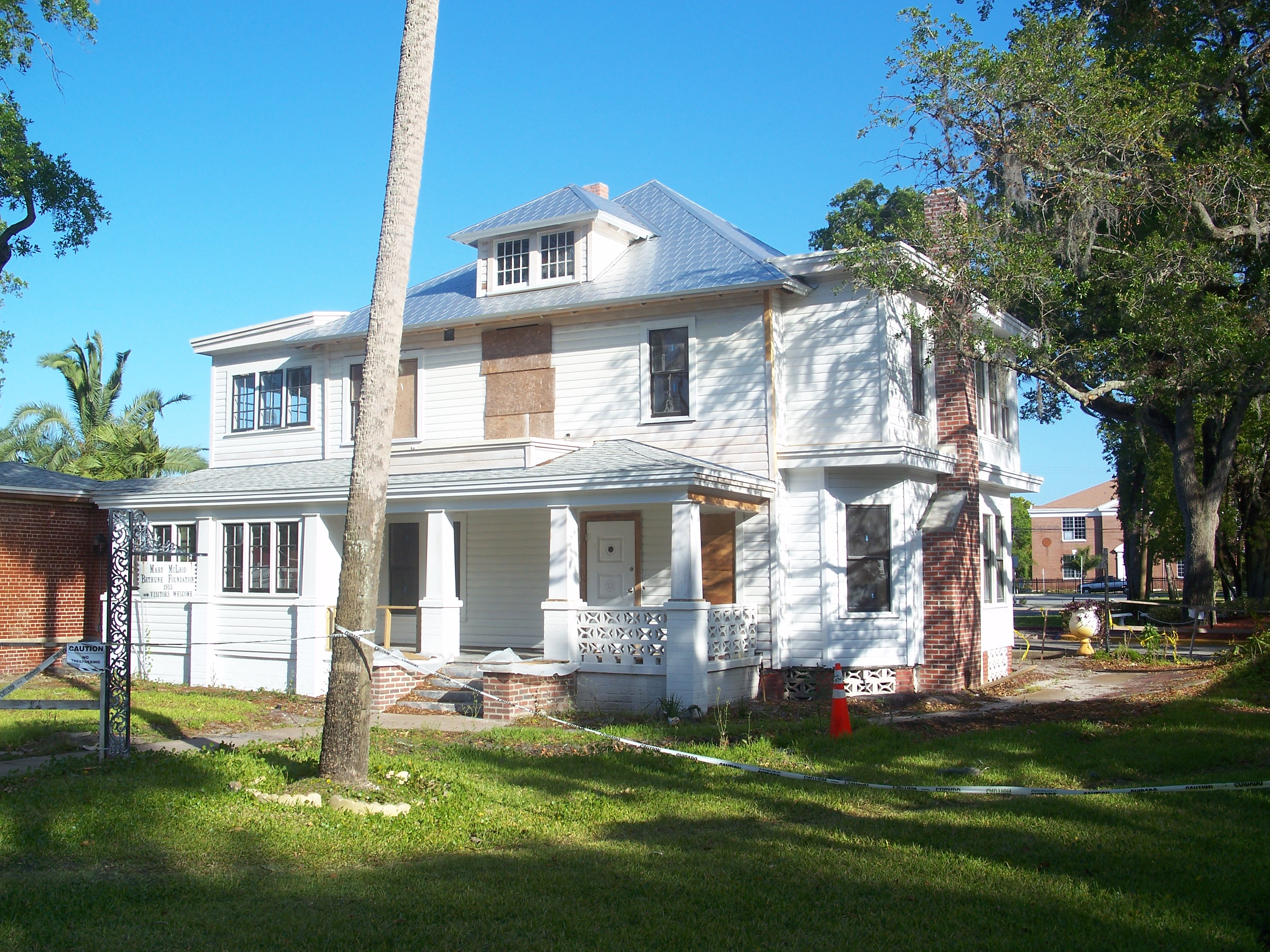
In 2009

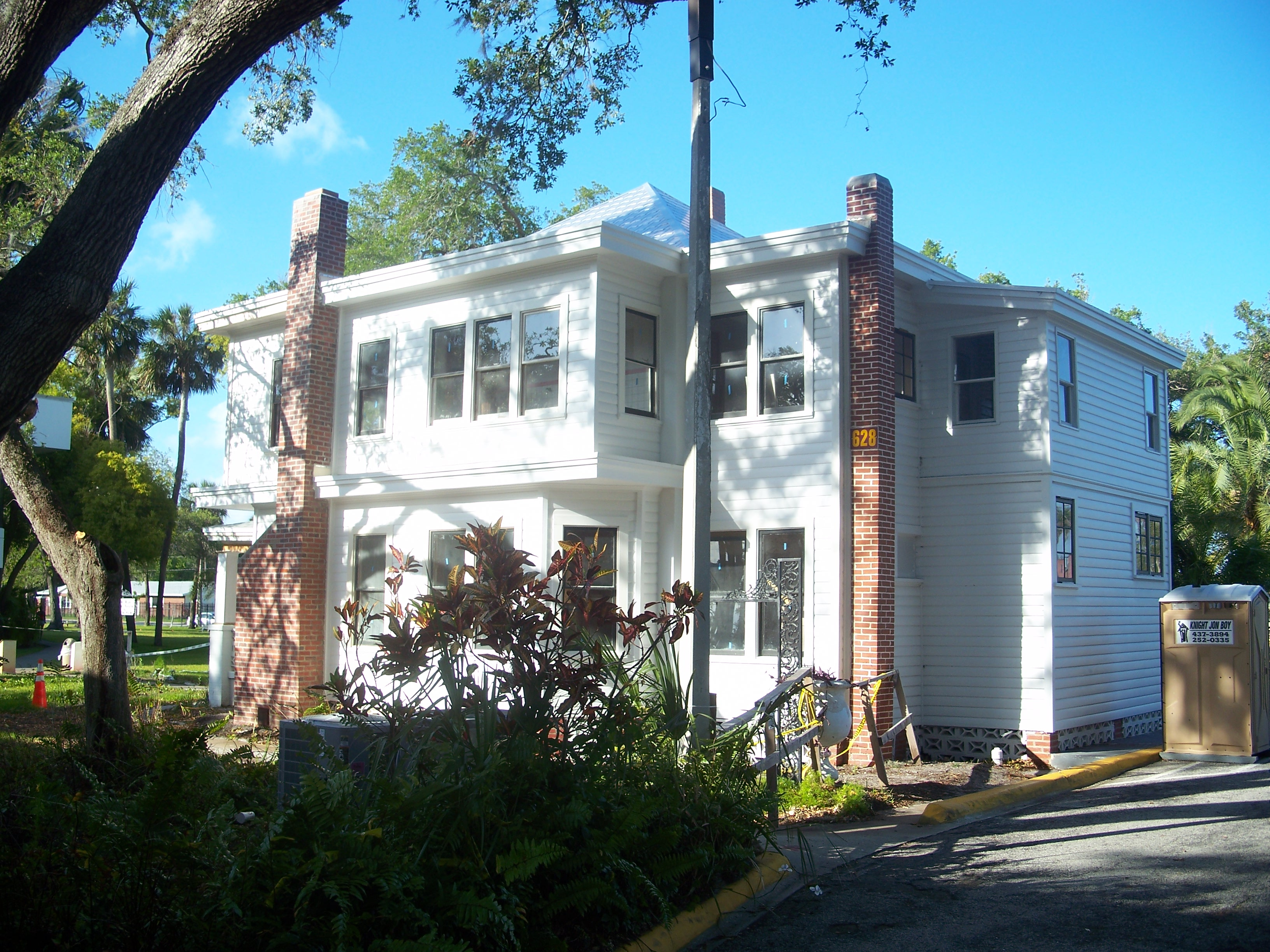
In 2009
