= Founder's Hall (Rockefeller University) =

- Founder's Hall, The Rockefeller University
- U.S. National Register of Historic Places
- U.S. National Historic Landmark
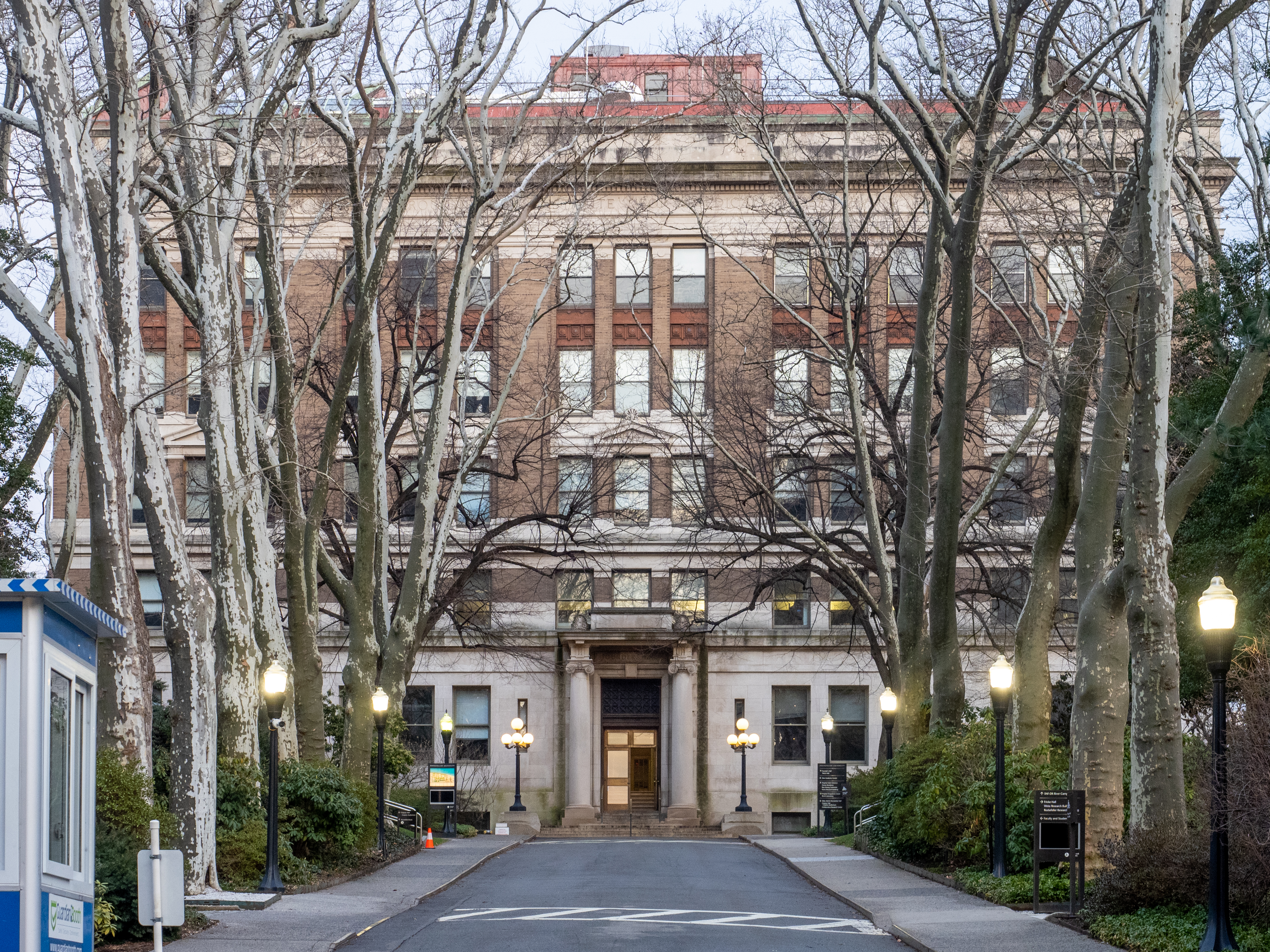

- Location within Manhattan Location within New York Location within the United States
- Location: 66th Street and York Avenue, Manhattan, New York City, New York
- Coordinates: 40°45′47″N 73°57′18″W
- Area: less than one acre
- Built: 1906
- Architect: Shepley, Rutan & Coolidge
- Architectural style: Classical Revival
- NRHP reference No.: 74001269

Significant dates
- Added to NRHP: September 13, 1974
- Designated NHL: May 30, 1974

Founder's Hall was the first building built on the campus of Rockefeller University at 66th Street and York Avenue, in Manhattan, New York City. Built between 1903 and 1906, it represents an instance of one of John D. Rockefeller's largest scale efforts at philanthropy, and housed the nation's first major biomedical research laboratory. Construction costs for Founder's Hall, which included an animal housing facility and a powerhouse, were $276,000. It was declared a National Historic Landmark in 1974. The building is now mainly used for school offices.

== Description and history ==
Founder's Hall is located near the center of the campus of Rockefeller University on Manhattan's Upper East Side, between the end of 66th Street and FDR Drive. It is a steel-framed five-story building, its exterior finished in gray brick with limestone trim. It has Classical Revival styling, with broad pilasters separating groups of window bays, and an entrance with a portico supported by Ionic columns. It was built in 1903 to a design by the architectural form Shepley, Rutan & Coolidge.

John D. Rockefeller (1839–1937) amassed one of the greatest fortunes of the late 19th century in the oil business, from which he retired in 1897. His efforts at philanthropy were formally guided from 1891 by Frederick T. Gates, a Baptist minister who had previously (1889) recommended to Rockefeller that he establish the University of Chicago. Much of Rockefeller's early philanthropy was on a comparatively small scale, and it was soon clear that larger-scale endeavors needed to be organized to properly guide his charitable giving. Gates suggested to Rockefeller that he establish a medical research institute that would be on a par with major European institutions of the period. In June 1902, Rockefeller made a commitment of $1 million to establish such an institute. In 1903 he purchased the former Schermerhorn estate, which is now the university's core campus. Founder's Hall was one of the first three buildings on the campus, housing its principal research laboratories.

== See also ==
- List of National Historic Landmarks in New York City
- National Register of Historic Places listings in Manhattan from 59th to 110th Streets
