= Chi Omega Greek Theatre =

- Chi Omega Greek Theatre; University of Arkansas, Fayetteville
- U.S. National Register of Historic Places
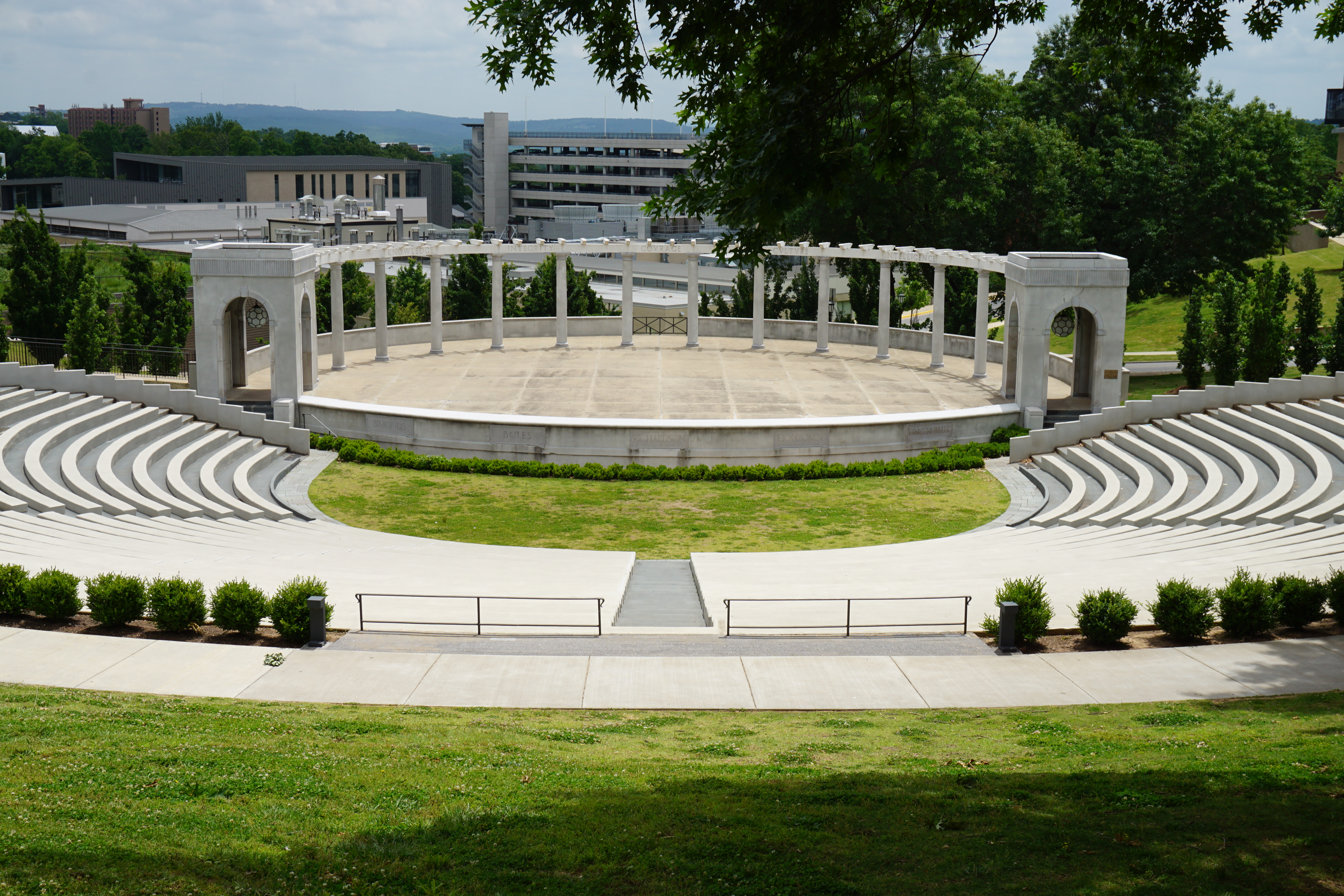

- Location within Arkansas Location within the United States
- Location: Dickson St., Fayetteville, Arkansas
- Coordinates: 36°4′0″N 94°10′24″W
- Area: less than one acre
- Built: 1930
- Architect: Jamieson and Spearl
- Architectural style: Greek
- MPS: Public Schools in the Ozarks MPS
- NRHP reference No.: 92001101
- Added to NRHP: September 4, 1992

The Chi Omega Greek Theatre is a structure on the University of Arkansas campus in Fayetteville, Arkansas. It was a gift to the university from Chi Omega, and it was completed in 1930. The structure was added to the National Register of Historic Places in 1992.

== Construction ==
Mary Love Collins, national president for 42 years, and Dr. Charles Richardson, one of the founding members of the Chi Omega women's fraternity, had the dream of one day building a replica of the Theatre of Dionysus at the foot of the Acropolis in Greece at the University of Arkansas. The first chapter (Psi) of Chi Omega was established at the university in 1895, and the national organization gave back to the university in 1930 by completing Love and Richardson's dream. Young-Bryan Construction Company was contracted in 1930 for the job, at a cost of $31,225. University president John C. Futrall accepted the gift on June 28, 1930.

== Uses ==
The university uses the Chi Omega Greek Theatre for concerts, commencements, convocations, plays, and pep rallies.

Each fall Cross Church hosts a kick-off worship service for college students on the first Wednesday of classes. The event is called C3 at the Greek and draws over 2,000 students every year.

During World War II, a crowd of over 6,000 gathered to watch the Army Air Corps Band. This is believed to be the largest crowd in the theatre's history.

== See also ==
- National Register of Historic Places listings in Washington County, Arkansas
