= Lincoln Hall, Berea College =

- U.S. National Register of Historic Places
- U.S. National Historic Landmark
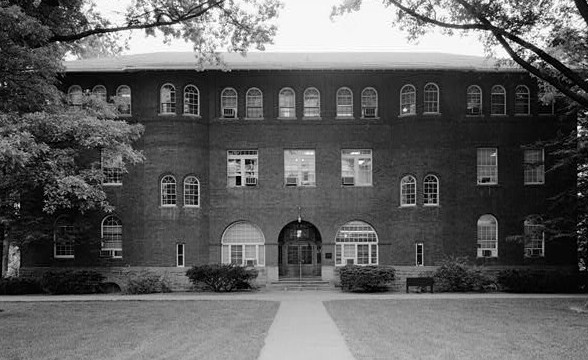
- Lincoln Hall, Berea College in 1980

- Location within Kentucky Location within the United States
- Location: Berea College campus, Berea, Kentucky
- Coordinates: 37°34′19″N 84°17′26″W
- Area: less than one acre
- Built: 1887
- NRHP reference No.: 74000892
- Added to NRHP: December 2, 1974

Lincoln Hall is the administrative center of Berea College in Berea, Kentucky. Built in 1887 and named in honor of Abraham Lincoln, it was declared to be a U.S. National Historic Landmark in 1974 in recognition of the college's role as the first school of higher education in the nation established to provide a racially integrated educational environment.

== Description and history ==
Lincoln Hall is centrally located on the campus of Berea College, just northwest of the junction of Chestnut and Prospect Street, on the south side of the campus's central quadrangle. It is a three-story brick building, covered by a hip roof and exhibiting modest Romanesque architectural features. It was built in 1887, originally with first floor for classrooms and offices, with second floor for classrooms and a library, and with third floor for laboratories, a museum and meeting rooms. It was funded by donation from Roswell C. Smith, founder of Century Magazine. As the college grew, uses of the hall changed. By 1974, the building was used for the President's office and other administrative functions, a role it continues to play today.

Berea College was founded in 1855 by John Gregg Fee, but was closed during the American Civil War due to threatened violence against its principles of racial integration. It is significant as the first college established in the United States expressly for the goal of educating black and white students together, a principle it upheld until the early 20th century. In 1904, the state passed a law forcing Berea to segregate, resulting in the landmark Berea College v. Kentucky case in which the law was upheld.

== See also ==
- List of National Historic Landmarks in Kentucky
- National Register of Historic Places listings in Madison County, Kentucky
