= Hiram Price/Henry Vollmer House =

Historic house in Iowa, United States

- U.S. National Register of Historic Places
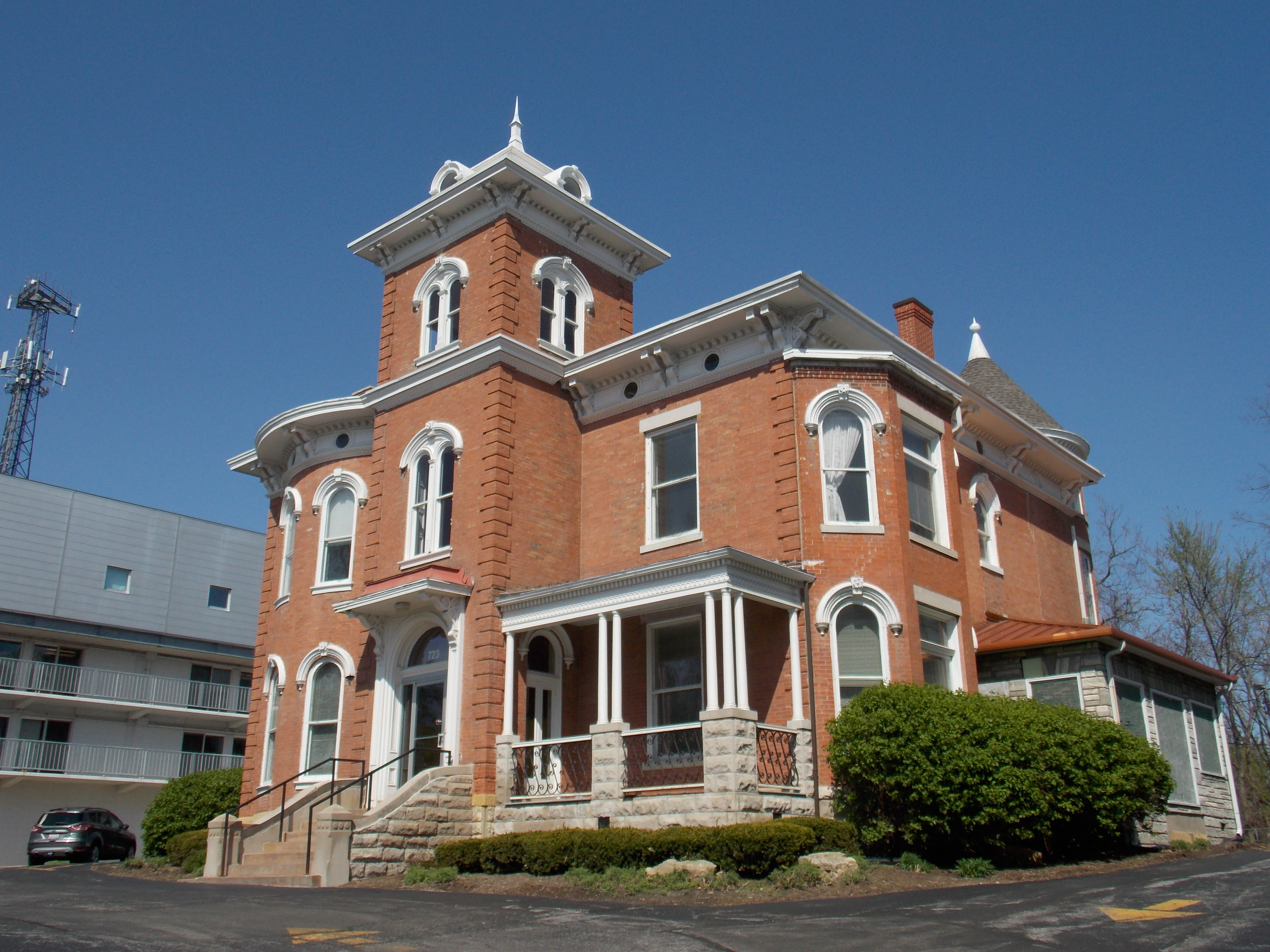

- Location within Iowa Location within the United States
- Location: 723 Brady St. Davenport, Iowa
- Coordinates: 41°31′39″N 90°34′25″W
- Area: less than one acre
- Built: 1870
- Architectural style: Italianate
- MPS: Davenport MRA
- NRHP reference No.: 83002487
- Added to NRHP: July 7, 1983

The Hiram Price/Henry Vollmer House is a historic building located on the Brady Street Hill in Davenport, Iowa, United States. It was listed on the National Register of Historic Places in 1983. The home is named for two members of the United States House of Representatives who lived in the house, Hiram Price and Henry Vollmer, who both represented Iowa's 2nd congressional district. The building is now a part of the campus of Palmer College of Chiropractic where it houses the Office of Strategic Development.

== Hiram Price ==
Hiram Price (1810–1901) was a native of Washington County, Pennsylvania, and moved to Davenport in 1844. He was a businessman in the city and became involved in local politics. Price was an advocate of the Temperance Movement and worked to pass the prohibition of liquor in the state of Iowa. He also was involved in establishing the railroads in Iowa. Politically, he was a Democrat until they tried to force slavery in Kansas. At that time he helped to form the Republican Party in Iowa. He supported Iowa's governor, Samuel Kirkwood, by raising both men and money to support the Union cause during the Civil War. Price represented the second district of Iowa in Congress twice, from 1861 to 1869 and from 1877 to 1880. In 1881 he was appointed Commissioner of Indian Affairs by President James Garfield. He died in Washington, D.C., in 1901. He was buried in Oakdale Cemetery in Davenport.

== Henry Vollmer ==
Henry Vollmer (1867–1930) was a native of Davenport who worked as an attorney and served the city as its mayor from 1892 to 1896. During his five terms as mayor the streets in the older part of town were paved and the current city hall was built. The city was also able to weather the financial panic of 1893. Vollmer won a special election in 1914 to the House of Representatives to fill the seat of Irvin S. Pepper, who died in office. Unlike Price, Vollmer did not support the prohibition of alcohol. He died in California.

== Architecture ==
The house was built by Price in 1870. It is a two-story Italianate structure built of brick. The dominant feature of the house is the three-story entrance tower. The arched windows have decorative hoods. Bracketed eaves and a hipped roof cap the house. An unusual feature of the house is the bowed front wing on the north side. The corners of the house and tower are quoined. The veranda on the south side of the front main level was enclosed and covered with permastone at one time. It has since been restored.
