= Joseph Henry House =

- U.S. National Register of Historic Places
- U.S. National Historic Landmark
- U.S. Historic district – Contributing property
- New Jersey Register of Historic Places
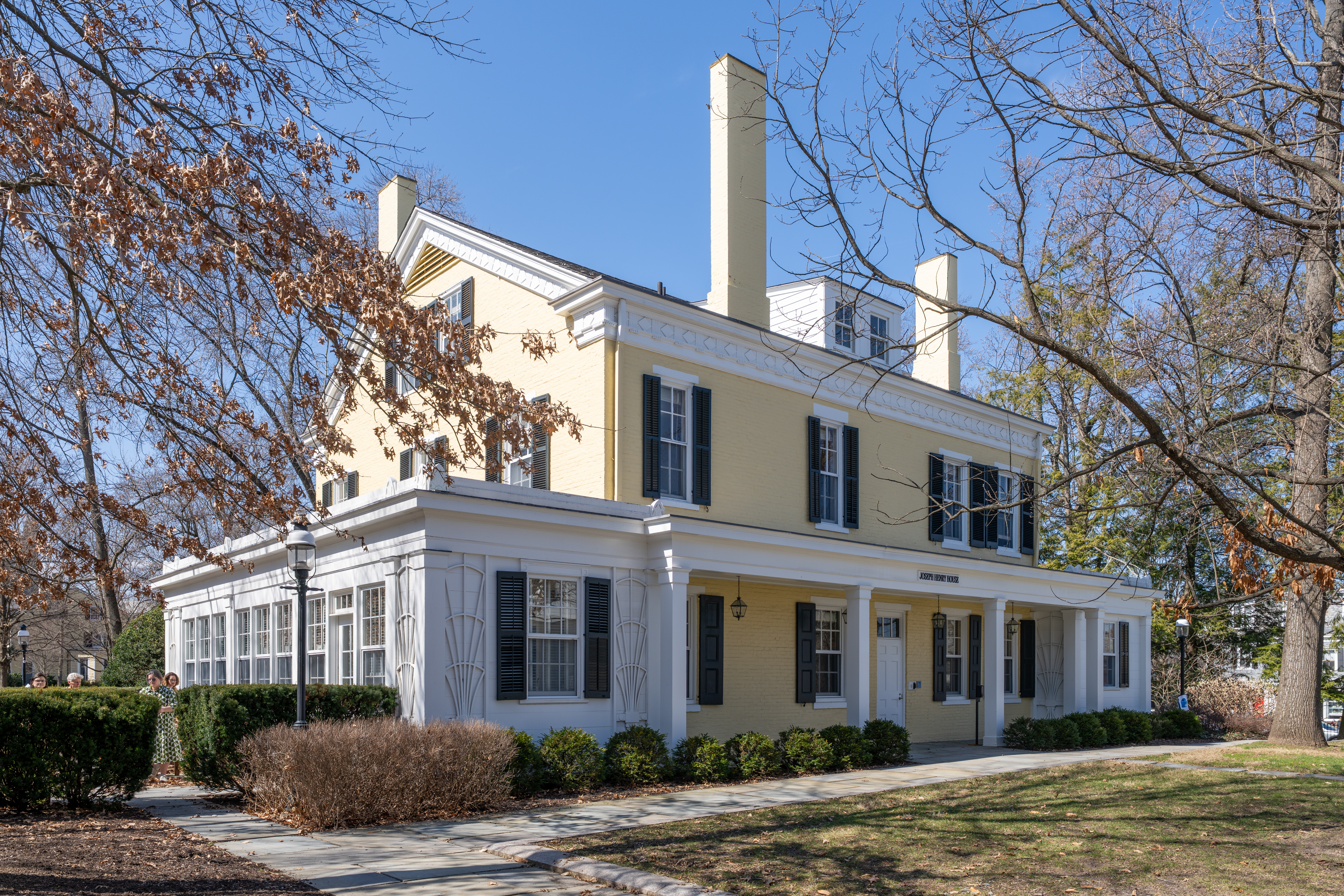

- Location within Mercer County, New Jersey Location within New Jersey Location within the United States
- Location: Princeton University campus, Princeton, New Jersey
- Coordinates: 40°20′57.73″N 74°39′31.96″W
- Area: less than one acre
- Built: 1836
- Part of: Princeton Historic District (ID75001143)
- NRHP reference No.: 66000464
- NJRHP No.: 1735

Significant dates
- Added to NRHP: October 15, 1966
- Designated NHL: January 12, 1965
- Designated NJRHP: May 27, 1971

The Joseph Henry House is a historic building located on the campus of Princeton University in Princeton, Mercer County, New Jersey, United States. Joseph Henry, a prominent American physicist who worked in electromagnetics, designed the house in 1836 and lived there from its completion in 1838 until taking a position as the first secretary of the Smithsonian Institution in 1848. The construction of the house was offered to the young physicist as part of the University's attempt to hire him away from the Albany Academy in an attempt to raise Princeton's profile. After Henry's departure, the house served as the official housing of the Dean of the College, the University's senior undergraduate academic officer, from 1909 to 1961.

The Henry house has been moved repeatedly throughout its history, first in 1870 to a site behind East College, again in 1925 to the corner of Washington Road and Nassau Street to accommodate the construction of the Princeton University Chapel, and finally in 1946 to its present location. The Henry house now stands along the northern edge of the University's campus adjacent to Chancellor Green and serves the home of Princeton's Adlinger Center for the Humanities. The house was declared a National Historic Landmark in 1965.

The house is a 2 1/2-story brick building with a gabled roof. It has an asymmetrical five-bay facade, with a single-story open porch extending across the front and single-story wings extending to the sides. The roof is pierced by several irregularly placed chimneys. The main entrance is roughly centered on the facade, with a three-light transom window above.

== See also ==
- List of National Historic Landmarks in New Jersey
- National Register of Historic Places listings in Mercer County, New Jersey
