= List of university and college presidents' houses in the United States =

This is a list of notable official residences of university and college presidents in the United States. For the world-wide list, see List of university presidents' houses.

== Alabama ==
- President's Mansion (University of Alabama)
- President's House, Marion Institute, of Marion Military Institute, Marion, Alabama, NRHP-listed in Perry County
- President's House (Auburn, Alabama), Auburn University

== Arizona ==
- President's House (Tempe, Arizona), Arizona State University

== Arkansas ==
- President's House (Conway, Arkansas), Hendrix College
- President's House (Southern Arkansas University), Magnolia, Arkansas

== California ==
- Hoover House - President of Stanford University
- Blake House - President of the University of California system (1967-2008)
- Selden Williams House - President of the University of California system (2022–Present)
- Chancellor's House, College Park - Chancellor of UC Davis
- Tierney University House - Chancellor of UC Irvine
- University House - Chancellor of UC Santa Barbara
- Geisel University House - Chancellor of UC San Diego
- University House - President of the University of California system (1911-1958); Chancellor of UC Berkeley (1965–Present)
- Chancellor's Residence - Chancellor of UCLA
- University House - Chancellor of UCSF
- University House, San Luis Obispo - President of Cal Poly

== District of Columbia ==
- F Street House - George Washington University
- President's House - Gallaudet College

== Florida ==
- President's House (University of Florida)
- President's House (Florida State University)

== Georgia ==
- President's House (University of Georgia)

== Illinois ==
- Presidents House, University of Chicago, Chicago, Illinois
- Presidents House, University of Illinoiis Urbana Champaign

== Indiana ==
- Bryan House (Bloomington, Indiana), Indiana University
- Allison Mansion, Marian University
- Westwood House (West Lafayette, Indiana), Purdue University

== Iowa ==
- President's Cottage, William Penn University, Oskaloosa, Iowa
- Presidents Residence, University of Iowa, Iowa City, Iowa

== Kentucky ==
- President's Home (Bowling Green, Kentucky), NRHP-listed in Warren County

== Louisiana ==
- President's Home, Northwestern State University, NRHP-listed in Natchitoches Parish
- Dodd College President's Home, NRHP-listed in Caddo Parish

== Massachusetts ==
- Brandeis University President's House, Newton, Massachusetts
- President's House (Harvard) (1912-1971)
- Elmwood, Harvard University (1971–Present)
- Hillside, University of Massachusetts Amherst

== Michigan ==
- President's House, University of Michigan

== Minnesota ==
- Eastcliff, University of Minnesota, Saint Paul

== New Hampshire ==
- President's House (Keene State College), New Hampshire

== New Jersey ==
- President's House (Princeton University), New Jersey
- President's House (Rutgers), New Brunswick, New Jersey

== New Mexico ==
- President's House (University of New Mexico), Albuquerque, New Mexico, NRHP-listed in Bernalillo County
- Nason House, formerly the University President's House at New Mexico State University (1916-1980)

== New York ==
- Hamilton Fish House, a/k/a Stuyvesant Fish House, Nicholas and Elizabeth Stuyvesant Fish House - President of Cooper Union
- President's House (Columbia University)

== Ohio ==
- President's House (Heidelberg University), Tiffin, Ohio, NRHP-listed in Seneca County

== Oklahoma ==
- Boyd House (University of Oklahoma), Norman, Oklahoma, known as President's House and as OU White House

== Oregon ==
- McMorran House, Eugene, Oregon, one University of Oregon's buildings

== Pennsylvania ==
- Chancellor's Residence (University of Pittsburgh)
- President's House (Bucknell University)
- President's House (Washington & Jefferson College), Washington, Pennsylvania

== Rhode Island ==
- President's House (Naval War College), Newport, Rhode Island

== South Carolina ==
- President's House (Clemson University), South Carolina
- Harbison College President's Home, Abbeville, South Carolina
- President’s House, University of South Carolina (part of NRHP-listed Old Campus district)

== Tennessee ==
- Samuel Rexinger House, Austin Peay State University, Clarksville, Tennessee
- Shelbridge, East Tennessee State University, Johnson City, Tennessee

== Texas ==
- Albritton House at Baylor University, Waco Texas
- President's House (Commerce, Texas), NRHP-listed in Hunt County
- President's House at Texas College, Tyler, Texas, NRHP-listed in Smith County

== Utah ==
- Westminster College President's House, NRHP-listed in Salt Lake City

== Virginia ==
- President's House (College of William & Mary), Williamsburg, Virginia
- Vawter Hall and Old President's House, Virginia State University
- Brompton (Fredericksburg, Virginia), University of Mary Washington
- Carr's Hill, University of Virginia, Charlottesville, Virginia

== West Virginia ==
- President's House (Bluefield State College), West Virginia
- Young-Noyes House, University of Charleston

== See also ==
- List of university presidents' houses (world-wide list)
- List of governors' residences in the United States
