= President's House =

President's House or Home or Manision may refer to:

== Armenia ==
- President's House, Yerevan

== Pakistan ==
- Presidential Palace, Islamabad
- President's House, Karachi, former residence
- President's House, Dacca, former residence

== Sri Lanka ==
- President's House, Colombo

== Trinidad and Tobago ==
- President's House, Trinidad and Tobago

== United States ==
=== Residences of the President of the United States ===
- President's House (Philadelphia), home of Washington and Adams
- President's House (Ninth Street), mansion intended for the president of the United States in Philadelphia

=== College and university presidents' houses ===
Alabama

- President's House, Marion Institute, Marion
- President's Mansion (University of Alabama)

Arizona

- President's House (Tempe, Arizona), Arizona State University

Arkansas

- President's House (Southern Arkansas University), Magnolia

Florida

- President's House (University of Florida), Gainesville

Georgia

- President's House (University of Georgia), Athens

Kentucky

- President's Home (Bowling Green, Kentucky), NRHP-listed in Warren County

Louisiana

- President's Home, Northwestern State University, NRHP-listed in Natchitoches Parish
- Dodd College President's Home, NRHP-listed in Caddo Parish

Massachusetts

- Brandeis University President's House, Newton
- President's House (Harvard), Cambridge

Michigan

- President's House, University of Michigan

New Hampshire

- President's House (Keene State College)

New Jersey

- President's House (Princeton University)
- President's House (Rutgers), New Brunswick

New Mexico

- President's House (University of New Mexico), Albuquerque
- Nason House, formerly the University President's House at New Mexico State University

==== New York ====
- President's House (Columbia University)

Ohio

- President's House (Heidelberg University), Tiffin, NRHP-listed in Seneca County

Oklahoma

- Boyd House (University of Oklahoma), Norman, known as President's House and as OU White House

Pennsylvania

- President's House (Bucknell University)
- President's House (Washington & Jefferson College), Washington

Rhode Island

- President's House (Naval War College), Newport

South Carolina

- President's House (Clemson University)

Texas

- President's House (Commerce, Texas), NRHP-listed in Hunt County
- President's House at Texas College, Tyler, NRHP-listed in Smith County

Utah

- Westminster College President's House, NRHP-listed in Salt Lake City

Virginia

- President's House (College of William & Mary), Williamsburg

West Virginia

- President's House (Bluefield State College)

Washington, D.C.

- President's House (Gallaudet College)

== See also ==
- Official residence, lists houses of head of state for each country world-wide
- List of university and college presidents' houses
  - List of university and college presidents' houses in the United States
- Harbison College President's Home, Abbeville, South Carolina
- President's Pavilion, Kandy, Sri Lanka
- Beit HaNassi, residence of the president of Israel
- Rashtrapati Bhavan, residence of the president of India
- Rastrapati Bhawan, residence of the president of Nepal
- White House, residence of the President of the United States
- Vawter Hall and Old President's House, Virginia State University
- Governor's House (disambiguation)
