= University President's House =

University President's House or College President's House may refer to:

- Dodd College President's Home, NRHP-listed in Caddo Parish
- Brandeis University President's House, Massachusetts
- University President's House (Las Cruces, New Mexico)
- Harbison College President's Home, Abbeville, South Carolina
- Westminster College President's House, Salt Lake City, Utah, NRHP-listed in Salt Lake City

== See also ==
- List of university and college presidents' houses
  - List of university and college presidents' houses in the United States
- President's House (disambiguation)
