= Virginia State Trojans =

Athletics teams of Virginia State University

- University: Virginia State University
- Nickname: Trojans
- NCAA: Division II
- Conference: CIAA (primary)
- Athletic director: Tiffani-Dawn B. Sykes
- Location: Ettrick, Virginia
- Varsity teams: 20 (10 men's, 10 women's)
- Football stadium: Rogers Stadium (Capacity 7,909)
- Basketball arena: VSU Multi-Purpose Center
- Baseball stadium: Whaley Colbert Field
- Softball stadium: VSU Softball Field
- Tennis venue: VSU Tennis Complex
- Colors: Orange and blue
- Mascot: Troy the Trojan
- Website: govsutrojans.com

The Virginia State Trojans (also VSU Trojans) are the athletic teams that represent Virginia State University, located in Petersburg, Virginia, in NCAA Division II intercollegiate sports. The Trojans compete as members of the Central Intercollegiate Athletic Association for 14 of their varsity sports. Virginia State has been a member of the CIAA since 1920.

== Sports sponsored ==
The Trojans field 10 men's and 10 women's sports teams, including:

Men's sports	Women's sports
Baseball	Basketball
Basketball	Bowling
Cross country	Cross country
Football	Lacrosse
Golf	Soccer
Lacrosse	Softball
Soccer	Tennis
Tennis	Track and field^{1}
Track and field^{1}	Volleyball
^{1} – includes both indoor and outdoor
