= Robert Prentiss Daniel =

African-American psychologist, scholar and college president

President of Shaw University
- In office 1936–1950
- Preceded by: William Stuart Nelson
- Succeeded by: William Russell Strassner

President of Virginia State College
- In office 1950–1968
- Preceded by: James Hugo Johnston Jr.
- Succeeded by: James Franklin Tucker

Personal details
- Born: November 2, 1902 Ettricks, Virginia, U.S.
- Died: January 5, 1968 (aged 65) Petersburg, Virginia, U.S.
- Spouses: Blanche Ardell Taylor (1929); Marie Plummer Orsot (1966–1968)
- Education: Virginia Union University Columbia University
- Profession: Scholar, Educator
- Scientific career
- Fields: Psychology

Robert Prentiss Daniel (November 2, 1902 – January 5, 1968) was an African-American psychologist, scholar, and college president. Born in Ettrick, Virginia to Charles James and Carrie Daniel, he was the sixth of eight children.

== Personal life ==
In September 1929, Daniel married Blanche Ardell Taylor of Richmond. Taylor died before her husband, and in December 1966, Daniel remarried to North Carolina socialite Marie Plummer Orsot.

== Academic career ==
Robert P. Daniel graduated magna cum laude from Virginia Union University with a Bachelor of Arts in 1924. He was valedictorian and his class secretary. Upon graduation, he worked as an instructor of mathematics and freshman English for two years, and in 1926 he worked as an assistant professor of education. Daniel attended Columbia University for his graduate schooling, receiving a master's degree in education in 1928 and a Ph.D. in educational psychology in 1932. Concurrently and until 1936, he worked as a professor of education and psychology and Director of the Extension Division at Virginia Union University. Between 1932 and 1936, Daniel worked at Virginia Union University as Director of the Division of Educational Psychology and Philosophy. During the summers of 1935 and 1936, Daniel worked as a visiting professor of education at Hampton Institute in Virginia.

In 1936, at 33 years old, Daniel became President of Shaw University in North Carolina.

In 1950, the Virginia State Board of Education elected Daniel as president of Virginia State College, where he worked until his death in 1968.

== Notable scholarship ==
Robert P. Daniel made significant contributions to educational psychology and Black psychology throughout his career. His premier scholarship "A Psychological Study of Delinquent Negro Boys" was published in 1932 in The Journal of Negro Education. The first contribution in its field, Daniel discusses perceived differences in character and personality traits of "behavior-problem" and "non-problem" Black boys. He administered seven tests which measured mental ability, neurotic instability, personality, personal aptitudes, moral knowledge, and trustworthiness. By comparing the results of the aforementioned tests between the problems and non-problem boys, he concludes that the two groups exhibited differences in the things they do and the degree they feel. Daniel aimed for his work to be a foundation in the field of Black youth delinquency and personality traits.

Daniel coauthored the article "The Curriculum of the Negro College," with his brother Walter G. Daniel. They review Black education and discuss an inconsistency apparent in Black schools: as a group, they are ten to thirty years behind American educational norms, but their courses are almost identical to those offered at White colleges. Daniel and Daniel argue that the college accreditation process prevents Black higher education from experimenting with different methods and course structure for Black students. Daniel and Daniel fault America's racial caste system for hindering Black students' success and argue for the need for differentiation from White educational norms in Black college education. They suggest increased financial support, institutional resources and professional leadership in Black colleges to achieve the highest quality of work, learning, and scholarship.

In 1960, as President of Virginia State College, Daniel published "Relationship of the Negro Public College and the Negro Private and Church- Related College," which describes the status of Black higher education . Private and college-related colleges, first established by White missionaries during Reconstruction, preceded publicly funded Black institutions. Publicly funded colleges, while having a slower establishment, became the choice higher education option for the majority of Blacks by the mid-1940s. In examining this change, Daniel explains that lower cost, more extensive curricula, and better faculties and facilities than specialized private- or church-related colleges explain the rise in enrollment at publicly funded Black colleges. Daniel concludes that despite the different routes Black youth take in attaining higher education, their success in life is dependent on an individual's ability to make their lives "count for good." He charges Black institutions with being adept at handling a nation and world that is constantly changing and work to excel in all academic fields.

== List of publications ==
- A Psychological Study of Delinquent Negro Boys
- Personality Differences Between Delinquent and Non-Delinquent Negro Boys
- Basic considerations for valid interpretations of experimental studies pertaining to racial differences
- Negro-White Differences in Non-Intellectual Traits, and in Special Abilities
- One Consideration of Redirection of Emphasis of the Negro College
- The Impact of War Upon the Church-Related College and University
- The Curriculum of the Negro College
- Relationship of the Negro Public College and the Negro Private and Church- Related College

== Contributions ==
Robert P. Daniel was affiliated with a number of professional organizations, including the American Psychological Association, National Association for the Study of Negro Life, American Association of School Administrators, American Teachers Association, and the National Education Association. Between 1936 and 1950, he served as a member of the executive committee of the North Carolina Inter-Racial Commission. In 1948, he was awarded the Distinguished Service Award in Education from the National Urban League.

In 1953, Daniel was nominated as president of the Conference of Presidents of Negro Land Grant Colleges.

As an ordained Baptist minister, Daniel served on various church governing boards. He served as a member commission on Interracial Activities National council for Boy Scouts of America. He was also an active member of the YMCA.
