= Marion Military Institute =

Public military junior college in Marion, Alabama, US

- Motto: Truth, Honor, Service
- Type: Public military junior college
- Established: 1842; 184 years ago
- Founder: James T. Murfee
- Parent institution: Alabama Community College System
- Accreditation: SACS
- Academic affiliations: AMCSUS
- President: Colonel David J. Mollahan, USMC (Ret.)
- Commandant: Colonel Edwin W. Passmore, USA (Ret.)
- Faculty: 23 full-time; 5 part-time
- Students: 308
- Location: Marion, Alabama, United States; 32.6237°N 87.3211°W
- Campus: 160 acres (0.65 km^{2}); Rural
- Colors: Orange and black
- Sporting affiliations: NJCAA Division I – ACCC
- Mascot: Tigers
- Website: marionmilitary.edu

Marion Military Institute, the Military College of Alabama, (MMI, sometimes Marion Institute, Marion Military, or simply Marion) is a public military junior college in Marion, Alabama. Founded in 1842, it is the official state military college of Alabama and the nation's oldest military junior college.

Marion Military Institute is one of only four military junior colleges in the United States. MMI's programs include the Army's two-year Early Commissioning Program (ECP), an Army Reserve Officers Training Corps program through which qualified cadets can earn a commission as a second lieutenant after only two years of college. MMI's ECP is one of the country's leading U.S. Army commissioning programs. The Service Academy Program (SAP) is a freshman year of academic and physical preparation for students who wish to attend one of the service academies in the United States. It is designated, endorsed, and selected by all five service academies. MMI also offers Marine Corps Platoon Leaders Course (PLC), the first two years of Air Force Reserve Officer Training Corps, or the Leadership Education Program (LEP) for those not intending to pursue military service. Over the years, MMI has produced more than 200 generals and admirals in the United States Armed Forces.

MMI is accredited by the Southern Association of Colleges and Schools Commission on Colleges to award Associate of Arts and Associate of Science degrees. It has association memberships in the Association of Military Colleges and Schools of the United States and the Alabama College Conference.

Marion Military Institute is an Alabama Historical Marker. It is the home of two National Register of Historic Places - the MMI Chapel and Lovelace Hall, and the President's House. The Alabama Military Hall of Honor (the Old Marion City Hall), created by executive order of Gov. George Wallace in 1975, is also on campus.

== History ==
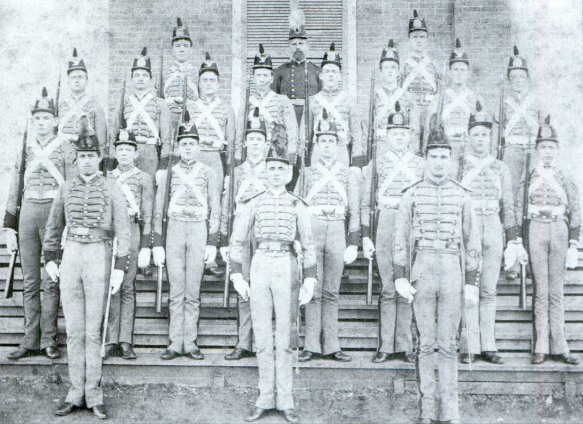
Believed to be J.T. Murfee (middle of the back row) with cadets of B company

Marion Military Institute traces its origins back to 1842 with the creation of Howard College in Marion, Alabama by the Alabama Baptist Convention. During the American Civil War, South Barracks (later known as Lovelace Hall), built in 1854, and the chapel, built in 1857, served the Confederacy as Breckenridge Military Hospital from 1863 to 1865. Along with the President's House (built 1912), these buildings are listed on the National Register of Historic Places.

In 1887, the decision was made to move Howard College (now Samford University) to Birmingham. The then President of Howard College, Colonel J. T. Murfee, LL.D., and a handful of faculty and students decided to remain in Marion, Alabama and immediately reorganized and founded Marion Military Institute, a military preparatory high school and college. It was modeled after Murfee's alma mater - Virginia Military Institute. Although built as a military college, H. O. Murfee, MMI's second president, believed that Marion was destined to become the "American Eton". Under his leadership, MMI achieved national recognition. President William Howard Taft served as President of the board of trustees. Then president of Princeton University, Woodrow Wilson was the guest speaker at the convocation for the class of 1905. However, the plan to pattern the school after Eton College was interrupted by World War I. The military nature of MMI was again emphasized due to the outbreak of the war. In 1916, United States Army ROTC program was first offered at MMI, when the institute was designated as an "Honor Military School with Distinction" by the United States Department of War.

The U.S. Army Early Commissioning Program was established at MMI in 1968, and in 1971, MMI became coeducational. In March 2006, the Alabama state legislature passed a resolution placing MMI under the auspices of the Alabama Department of Postsecondary Education. MMI became "the State Military College of Alabama". As part of the transition to a public institution, Marion phased out its high school program. In May 2009, the last high school class graduated from Marion Military Institute's Preparatory School Program, a program that traced its origins back to 1887.

In 2011, an MMI counselor Reginald Marable filed a lawsuit against the school after not being retained. Marable claimed he was harassed and fired for bringing up allegations that the school was discriminating against black students, including the idea that race mixing was forbidden. The United States District Court Southern District of Alabama ruled in the school's favor. In 2014, the plaintiff lost again on appeal, the court noting that racial animus was not a sufficient reason for ruling in the plaintiff's favor.

== Cadet structure ==
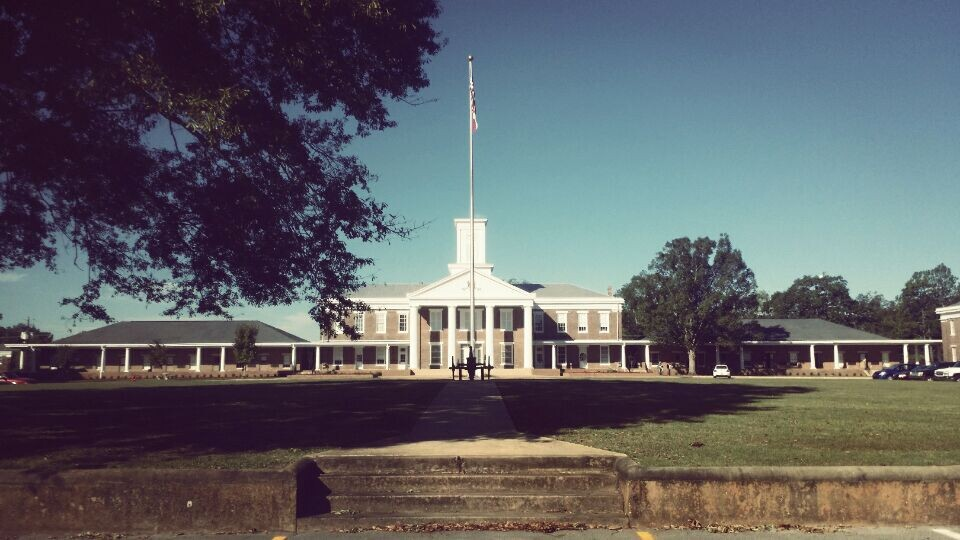
MMI Chapel

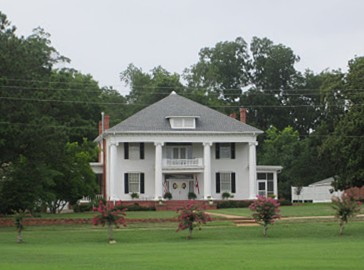
President's House, Marion Institute, built 1912

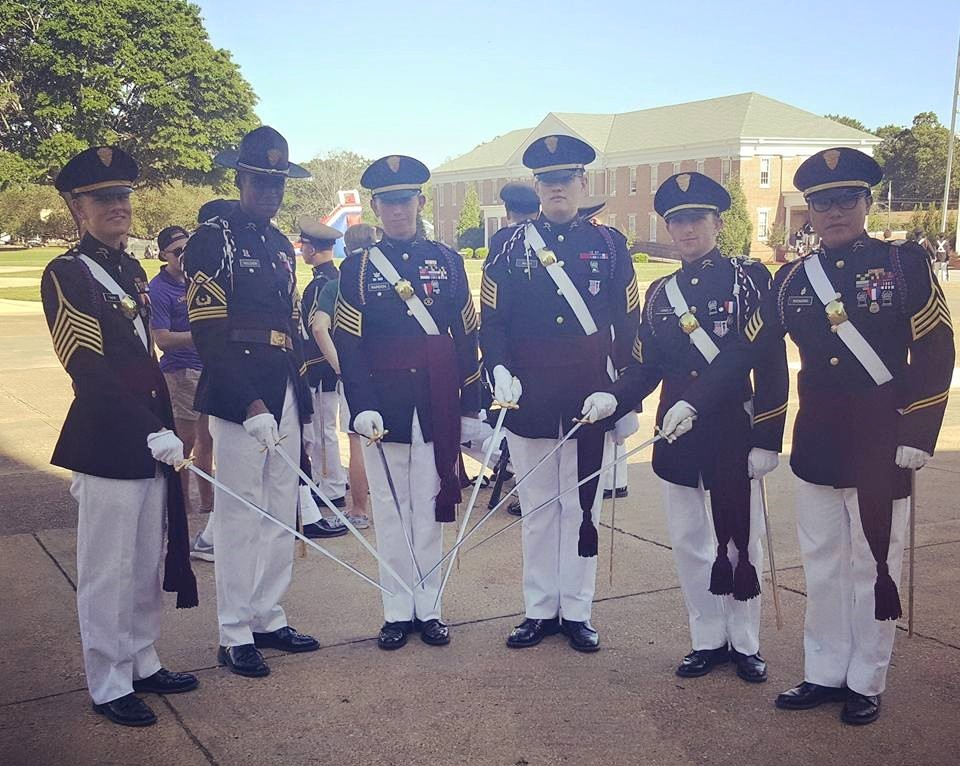
The HQ of the Corps of Cadets after Alumni Weekend parade 2016

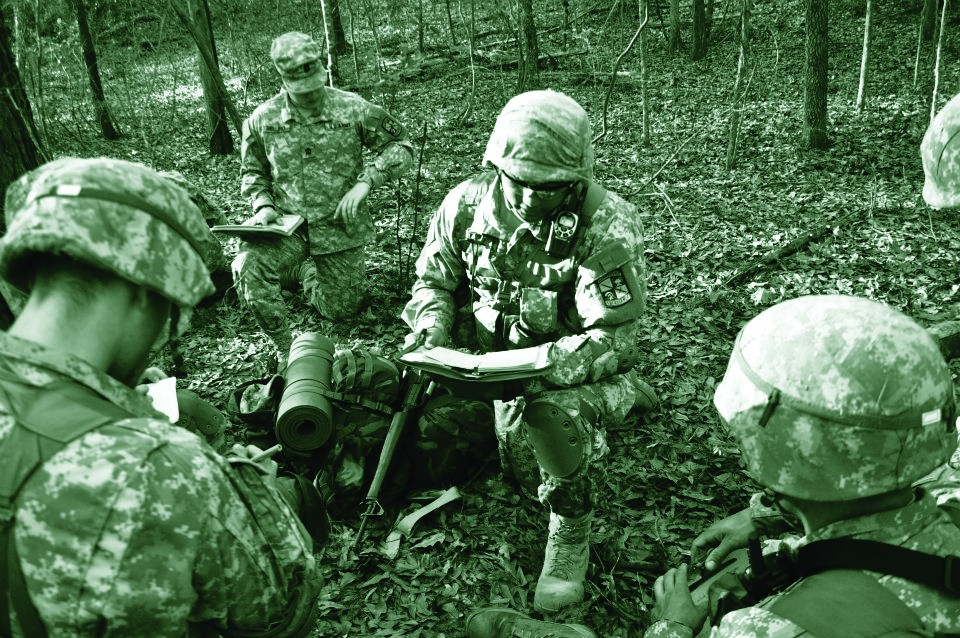
Senior cadets help juniors prepare for their LDAC in 2013.

The Corps of Cadets is organized into a battalion consisting of the Headquarters staff and six companies including Band, A, B, C, D, and E. A cadet lieutenant colonel exercises command and control of headquarters and five companies of cadets as the battalion commander. Each company has a cadet captain commanding, a cadet first lieutenant executive officer, two cadet second lieutenant platoon leaders, a cadet first sergeant, and two cadet sergeant first class platoon sergeants. Each platoon normally has three to four squads and each squad is led by a cadet staff sergeant.

Class A uniform rank insignia	Class B, C and ACU rank insignia	Cadet rank	Position
		Lieutenant Colonel	Battalion Commander
		Major	Battalion XO, S3; Honor Council Chair
		Captain	Company Commanders; Battalion S1, S2, S4, S5, and S3 Assistant
		First Lieutenant	Company XO; Battalion Chaplain; Organizational Commanders (Knights, Swamp Fox, and Honor Guard)
		Second Lieutenant	Platoon Leader
		Command Sergeant Major	Battalion Sergeant Major
		First Sergeant	Company First Sergeant
		Sergeant First Class	Platoon Sergeant
N/A		Staff Sergeant	Squad Leader; Assistant S5
N/A		Sergeant	Barracks NCO
N/A		Corporal	Guidon
N/A		Private First Class	Cadet
N/A	N/A	Recruit	New Recruits

== Athletics ==
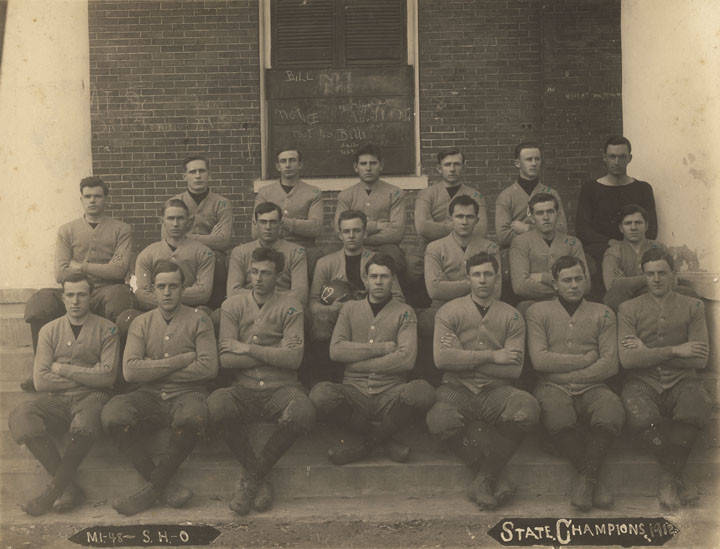
MMI football team, the state champion of 1912

Marion Military Institute athletics is nicknamed "Tigers". It is a member of Alabama Community College Conference (ACCC/Region XXII), which is a part of National Junior College Athletic Association (NJCAA) Division I. Currently, MMI has varsity teams for baseball, men's basketball, softball, tennis, cross country, and golf. The school colors were originally pink and green when established, but they were changed to orange and black following Woodrow Wilson's appearance at the MMI convocation. Marion adopted the tiger as the mascot in tribute to Princeton University.

After 15 consecutive winning games, MMI men's basketball team made history to capture school's first ACCC Basketball Championships in 2015–2016 season. They also represented Region XXII at the NJCAA Men's National Basketball Championships, but lost to McLennan Community College (70-78) in the first round. Marion Military Institute men's tennis team showed its dominance in the state of Alabama by holding the NJCAA Region XXII Championship five years in a row from 2011 to 2016. In 2013, the school hired former MLB player Matt Downs as the head coach of the baseball team. In 2016, Christopher Lawrence, former personal trainer of Javier Arenas and Kirani James, became the Marion's cross country coach.

Marion Military Institute also had a football team, which captured the state championship in 1912. On November 28, 1918, MMI earned a 101–0 victory over Howard College Football Team at home. This is MMI Football's largest margin of victory and the second largest margins of defeat in the history of Samford University Football Team. In the 1922 season, MMI cadets were defeated 0-110 by the University of Alabama at Tuscaloosa, Alabama in what still stands as the school record for largest margin of victory and as the Crimson Tide's only 100 point game.

== List of presidents ==
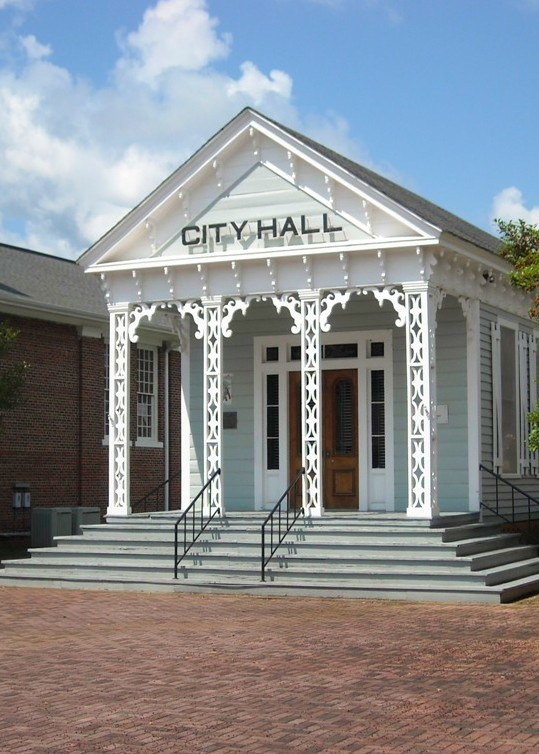
Alabama Military Hall of Honor

16 individuals have been president of Marion Military Institute:

No.	Portrait	Name	Term	Notes
1		J.T. Murfee	1887–1906	Former lieutenant colonel, CSA; First captain and standing 1st in VMI Class of 1853
2		H.O. Murfee	1906–1919	
3		W.L. Murfee	1919–1944	
4	–	J.T. Murfee II	1944–1953	
5	–	Linton H. Baer	1953–1954	
6	–	Robert Calhoun Provine	1954–1958	
7		Cato D. Glover	1958–1959	Admiral, USN (Ret.)
8	–	Paul B. Robinson	1959–1973	
9		Draper Kauffman	1974–1976	Rear admiral, USN (Ret.)
10	–	Thomas H. Barfield	1976–1983	Major general, USA (Ret.); Class of 1935
11	–	Clyde W. Spence	1983–1990	Major general, USA (Ret.); Class of 1946
12	–	Joseph L. Fant III	1990–1994	Major general, USA (Ret.); Class of 1947
13		Wayne T. Adams	1994–1998	Brigadier general, USMC (Ret.); Class of 1960
		vacancy	1998–2000	
14		Robert F. Foley	2000–2004	Lieutenant general, USA (Ret.); Medal of Honor recipient
15	–	James H. Benson	2004–2009	Colonel, USMC (Ret.)
16		David J. Mollahan	2009–present	Colonel, USMC (Ret.)

== Notable alumni ==
=== Early Commissioning Program ===
- Robert W. Bennett, U.S. Army brigadier general, 61st Adjutant General of the Army
- Jeff Brandes, Republican member of the Florida Senate
- Emerson Brooks, actor, NAACP Image Award winner
- Scott L. Efflandt, U.S. Army major general, former Fort Hood Commander
- Clark W. LeMasters, Jr., U.S. Army major general, 36th Chief of Ordnance and 35th TACOM LCMC Commanding General
- Terry F. Moorer, judge of the United States District Court for the Southern District of Alabama
- Shawn Morelli, Paralympic gold medalist in cycling
- Raymond F. Shields Jr., U.S. Army major general, commander of New York Army National Guard

=== Service Academy Program ===
- Paul D. Adams, U.S. Army general
- John Bahnsen, U.S. Army brigadier general and decorated veteran of the Vietnam War
- José M. Cabanillas, U.S. Navy rear admiral
- Robert E. Hogaboom, Chief of Staff of United States Marine Corps
- Bruce K. Holloway, USAF general, Vice Chief of Staff US Air Force, CinC Strategic Air Command
- Harold Houser, U.S. Navy rear admiral and the 35th governor of American Samoa
- Clayton C. Jerome, USMC naval aviator
- Alexander Kreiser, USMC brigadier general, China Marine, and naval aviator
- Halley G. Maddox, U.S. Army major general
- Merlin O'Neill, 10th commandant of the Coast Guard
- William W. Outerbridge, U.S. Navy rear admiral who fired the first shots in defense of the United States during World War II
- Jacob E. Smart, USAF general
- Thomas Walker, U.S. Navy vice admiral, first commanding officer of the USS Constellation (CV-64)

=== Others ===
- Mike Carey, member of the United States House of Representatives
- Bernard Ford, former NFL player
- Miller Reese Hutchison, electrical engineer. Inventor of Klaxton Horn and hearing aids. Associate of Thomas Alva Edison
- Maston E. O'Neal, Jr., member of the United States House of Representatives
- Jimmy Rane, founder and CEO of Great Southern Wood Preserving
- Eugene Sledge, United States Marine, professor, and author
- Tom Stagg, judge for the United States District Court for the Western District of Louisiana
- Dwight Stone, former NFL player
- Robert H. York, U.S. Army lieutenant general

== See also ==
- Judson College
