= Gallaudet College Historic District =

Historic district in Washington, D.C., United States

- U.S. National Register of Historic Places
- U.S. National Historic Landmark District
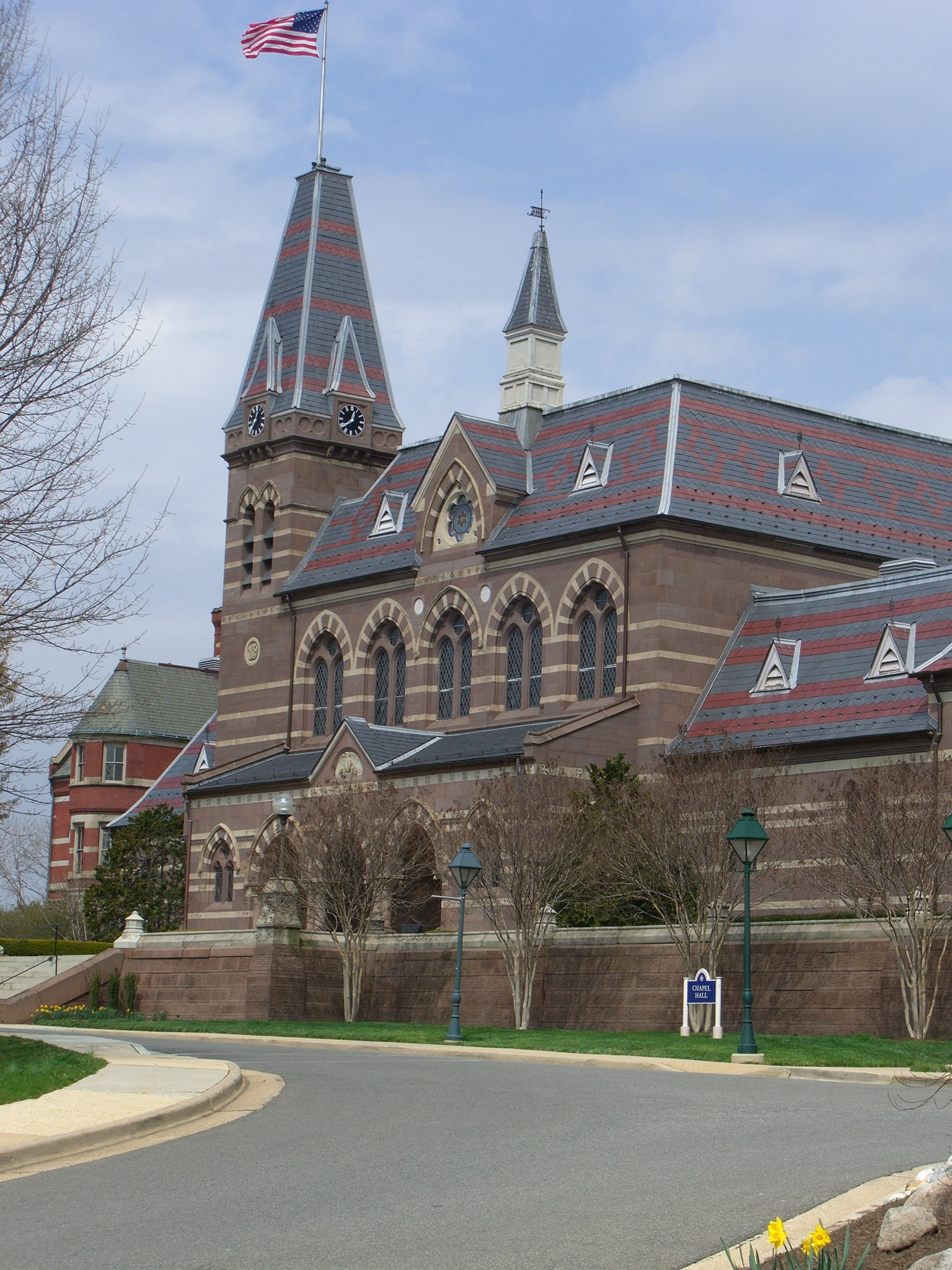

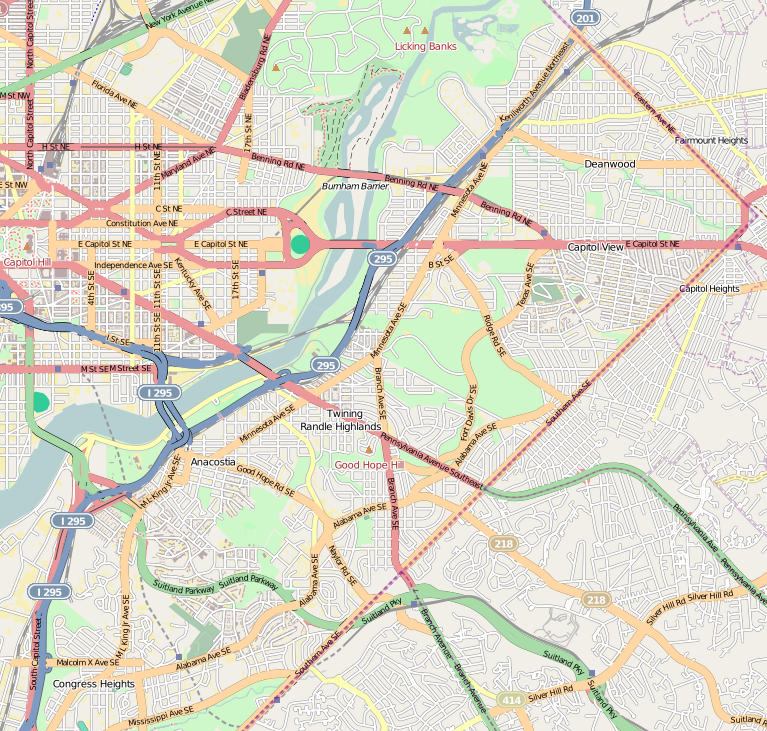
- Location within Washington, D.C. Location within the United States
- Location: Florida Ave. and 7th St., NE., Washington, D.C.
- Coordinates: 38°54′22″N 76°59′46″W
- Area: 15 acres (6.1 ha)
- Built: 1866–1867
- Architect: Frederick C. Withers (original); Vaux, Withers & Co.; French, Daniel Chester (increase)
- Architectural style: Gothic
- NRHP reference No.: 66000856 (original); 74002160 (increase)

Significant dates
- Added to NRHP: October 15, 1966
- Boundary increase: September 10, 1974
- Designated NHLD: December 21, 1965

The Gallaudet College Historic District is a National Historic Landmark District encompassing the historic early campus of Gallaudet University in Washington, D.C. Gallaudet is the first school of higher education to be devoted to the education of the deaf and hard of hearing. Its campus was planned by Frederick Law Olmsted and Calvert Vaux, and its Gothic buildings were designed by Frederick C. Withers. The main Gallaudet College building was listed on the National Register of Historic Places in 1966 and designated a National Historic Landmark in 1965. The landmarked area was increased to cover the southern part of the campus, and was renamed as a historic district in 1974.

== Description and history ==
An early school for the deaf was founded in 1857 by Amos Kendall, and was located on 8th Street NE. Edward Gallaudet, a superintendent of that school, envisioned a larger federally chartered institution, and in 1864 founded the Columbia Institution for the Deaf and Dumb, which was renamed in honor of his father in 1894. The master plan for the school's Washington campus was developed by the Olmsted, Vaux & Co. in 1866, and its first three buildings were designed by Vaux & Withers. Most of the master plan was carried out by 1878; a significant portion of that area has retained historic integrity and looks much as it did at its completion. The main exception is areas to the north and east, where the college (later university) has expanded.

The historic district covers about 15 acres (6.1 ha) of the Gallaudet campus, which is now about 90 acres (36 ha) in size. It is roughly L-shaped, bounded on the south by Florida Avenue and the east by Fowler and Kendall Halls. From Kendall Hall the boundary runs west, between Edward Miner Gallaudet and College Hall, north to the Old Gymnasium, and then west and south to include Faculty Row. The district includes Chapel Hall, a major example of Collegiate Gothic architecture and the President's House, an elaborate example of High Victorian Gothic design, both designed by Frederick Withers as part of the original master plan.

== See also ==
- List of National Historic Landmarks in Washington, D.C.
- National Register of Historic Places listings in Northeast Quadrant, Washington, D.C.
