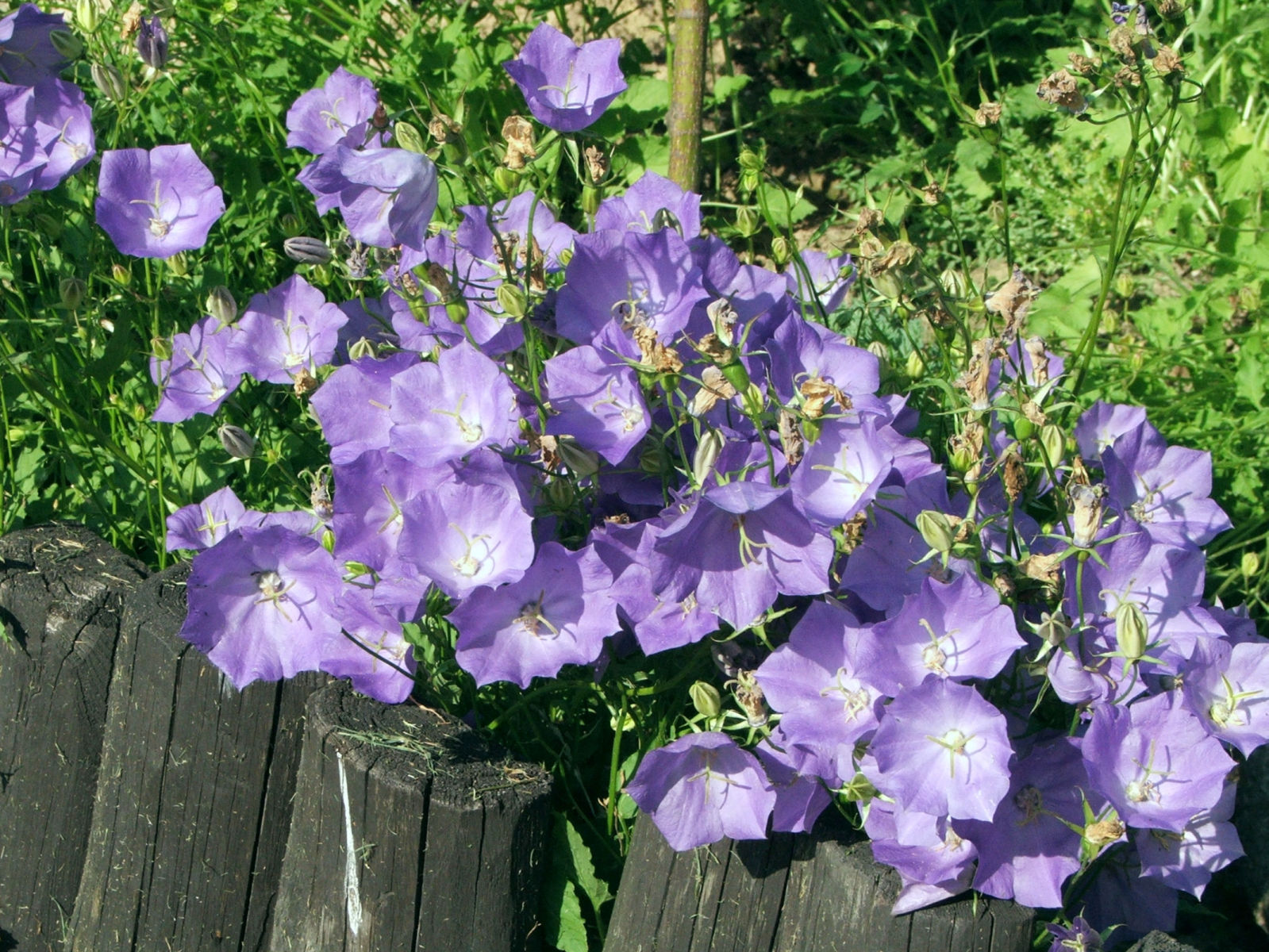

Scientific classification
- Kingdom: Plantae
- Clade: Tracheophytes
- Clade: Angiosperms
- Clade: Eudicots
- Clade: Asterids
- Order: Asterales
- Family: Campanulaceae
- Genus: Campanula
- Species: C. carpatica

Binomial name
- Campanula carpatica Jacq.

Synonyms
- Campanula carpatica f. dasycarpa (Schur) Tacik; Campanula carpatica f. subpilosa (Schur) Tacik; Campanula carpatica subsp. turbinata (Schott, Nyman & Kotschy) Nyman; Campanula cordifolia Vuk.; Campanula dasycarpa Schur; Campanula hendersonii Anon.; Campanula oreophila Schur; Campanula pseudocarpatica Schur; Campanula reniformis Schur; Campanula turbinata Schott, Nyman & Kotschy; Neocodon carpaticus (Jacq.) Kolak. & Serdyuk.

= Campanula carpatica =

Species of flowering plant in the bellflower family

Campanula carpatica, the tussock bellflower or Carpathian harebell, is a species of flowering plant in the family Campanulaceae.

== Description ==
Campanula carpatica is a low-growing herbaceous perennial. Plants possess basal leaves and thin, white rhizomes. Stems grow up to 45 cm (18 in) long. Flowers are solitary and stand on stalks ranging from 10–15 cm (3.9–5.9 in) long. Flowers are purple in colour and plants bloom from June to August.

== Distribution ==
=== Native Range ===
Campanula carpatica is native to parts of Europe including the Czech Republic, Romania, Slovakia, Ukraine, Poland and Western Russia. It can also be found growing within the Carpathian Mountains of Central Europe.

=== Introduced Range ===
Campanula carpatica has also been introduced into areas outside of its natural range. This species was introduced further into Europe in Hungary, Denmark, Belgium, France, Norway and the United Kingdom. The species was also introduced into North America where it has been recorded in the states of Connecticut and Michigan.

== Habitat ==
Campanula carpatica naturally grows in elevated, mountainous habitat where they grow in and amongst rocks.

== Cultivation ==
It was introduced to the Royal Botanic Garden at Kew in 1774 by Nikolaus Joseph von Jacquin.

Several cultivars in shades of white, blue, pink and purple, have been developed for garden use.

This plant has gained the Royal Horticultural Society's Award of Garden Merit.
