= Chapel and Lovelace Hall, Marion Military Institute =

- U.S. National Register of Historic Places
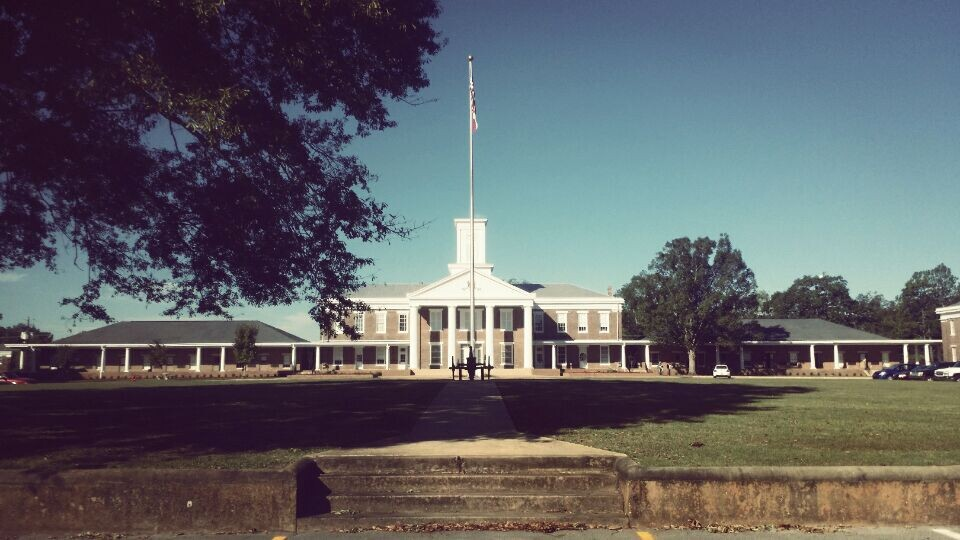

- Location within Alabama
- Location: AL 14, Marion, Alabama
- Coordinates: 32°37′25″N 87°19′19″W
- Area: 1.6 acres (0.65 ha)
- Built: 1854
- Architect: Noah K. Davis
- Architectural style: Classical Style, Greek Revival
- NRHP reference No.: 78000508
- Added to NRHP: September 13, 1978

The Chapel and Lovelace Hall, Marion Military Institute were listed on the National Register of Historic Places in 1978.

They are the two surviving buildings from the 1854–58 Howard College campus. Howard College moved in 1887 to Birmingham, Alabama and the Colonel James Thomas Murfee stayed behind to open Marion Military Institute. During the Civil War, the Chapel and Lovelace Hall, both built in 1857, were used as Breckinridge Military Hospital, treating both Union and Confederate soldiers.
