= President's Cottage =

Historic house in Iowa, United States

- U.S. National Register of Historic Places
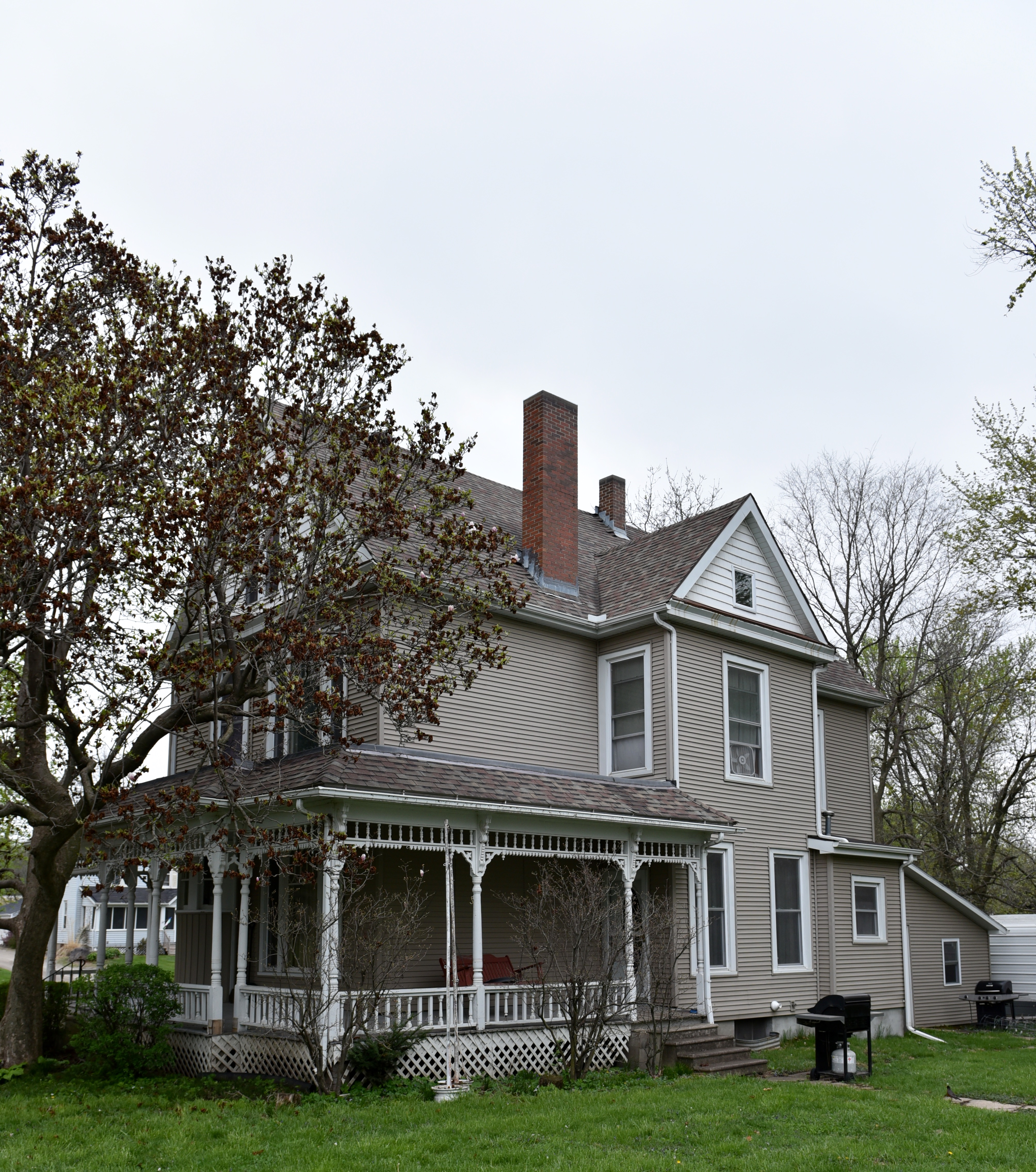

- Location within Iowa Location within the United States
- Location: 425 College Ave. Oskaloosa, Iowa
- Coordinates: 41°18′13″N 92°39′01″W
- Area: less than one acre
- Built: 1892
- MPS: Quaker Testimony in Oskaloosa MPS
- NRHP reference No.: 96000340
- Added to NRHP: March 28, 1996

The President's Cottage is a historic residence located in Oskaloosa, Iowa, United States. From 1892, when it was built, to 1918 this structure housed the president of William Penn College. It highlights the school's improved finances at the time of its construction, the importance it placed on its leadership, and its association with the Quaker testimony in Oskaloosa, which makes this house historic. The placement of the house on a corner lot at the end of College Avenue gave the campus a linear feel in the "Yale Row" concept of college design.

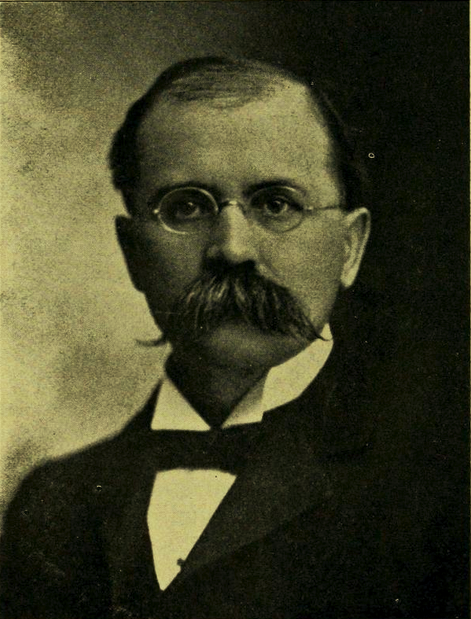
Absalom Rosenberger

Absalom Rosenberger and David M. Edwards and their families lived here during their presidencies. H. Edwin McGrew did not live in the house, and it is not certain whether some of the presidents lived here either because they already had homes in Oskaloosa. The college subsequently sold the house and it now serves as a private residence. The 2½-story frame structure features Queen Anne influences, a wrap-around front porch, and a gable-end roof with intersecting gables. It was listed on the National Register of Historic Places in 1996.
