= President's House (University of Georgia) =

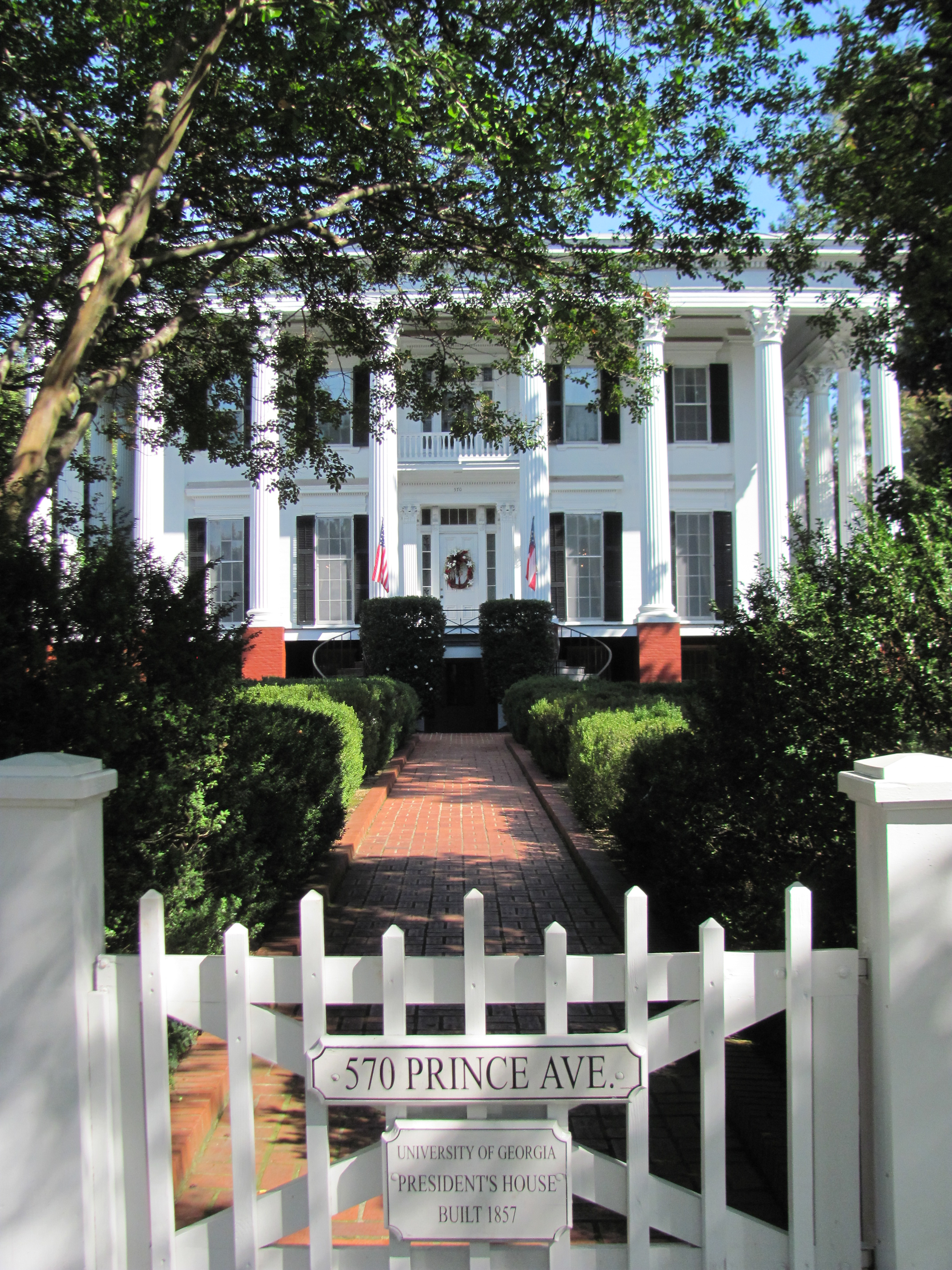
- President's House on Prince Avenue
- Interactive map of the President's House area

General information
- Type: Alumni Relations
- Architectural style: Greek Revival architecture
- Location: 570 Prince Ave, Athens, Georgia
- Coordinates: 33.9608°N 83.3781°W
- Completed: 1856

The President's House, also known as the Benjamin H. Hill House or the Grant-Hill-White-Bradshaw House, was erected in 1856 in Athens, Georgia. The mansion has served as University of Georgia president's residence since it was donated to the University System of Georgia in 1949.

John Thomas Grant constructed the house in 1856. Benjamin Harvey Hill, who served in both the House of Representatives and United States Senate, acquired the house in 1876. Later, James White, founder of the First National Bank of Athens, purchased the property in July 1883. However, his daughter, W. F. Bradshaw, inherited the house upon White's death during the same year.

The Bradley Foundation of Columbus, Georgia, acquired the property from Bradshaw's estate and in 1949 presented it to the University of Georgia as a home for its president. With the help of donations from the Bradley Foundation, the Georgia Board of Regents acquired the property in the early 1940s. The University of Georgia restored the house and grounds; Cooper, Bond, and Cooper were the architects in charge of remodelling, and Hubert B. Owens, A.S.L.A., designed the rear gardens. The front yard was refurbished in 1965.

The house is one of the oldest buildings in Athens, Georgia. The University of Georgia President's House was documented by the Historic American Buildings Survey and as of March 16, 1972 is listed on the National Register of Historic Places.

Michael F. Adams was the first President to relocate his residence off campus. The facility served as an Alumni building and special programs location on the University of Georgia campus. The university announced plans to sell the residence in 2023.

== See also ==
- Presidents Houses in the United States
- List of University of Georgia Presidents
