= Ettrick, Virginia =

- CDP
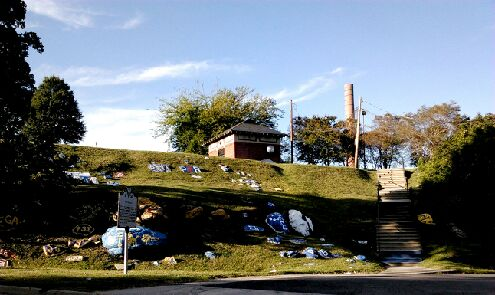
- Ettrick historic marker and steps to VSU, viewed from Campbell's Bridge over the Appomattox River

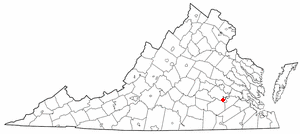
- Location of Ettrick, Virginia
- Coordinates: 37°14′34″N 77°25′32″W
- Country: United States
- State: Virginia
- County: Chesterfield

Area
  - Total: 3.0 sq mi (7.8 km^{2})
  - Land: 2.9 sq mi (7.6 km^{2})
  - Water: 0.077 sq mi (0.2 km^{2})
- Elevation: 105 ft (32 m)

Population (2020)
  - Total: 7,241
  - Density: 2,500/sq mi (950/km^{2})
- Time zone: UTC−5 (Eastern (EST))
  - Summer (DST): UTC−4 (EDT)
- FIPS code: 51-26128
- GNIS feature ID: 1496888

Ettrick is a census-designated place (CDP) in Chesterfield County, Virginia, United States. Per the 2020 census, the population was 7,241. The town is home to Virginia State University and the Petersburg Amtrak train station.

Most of Ettrick has a Petersburg mailing address, ZIP code 23803, although the community is not part of the city of Petersburg.

== History ==
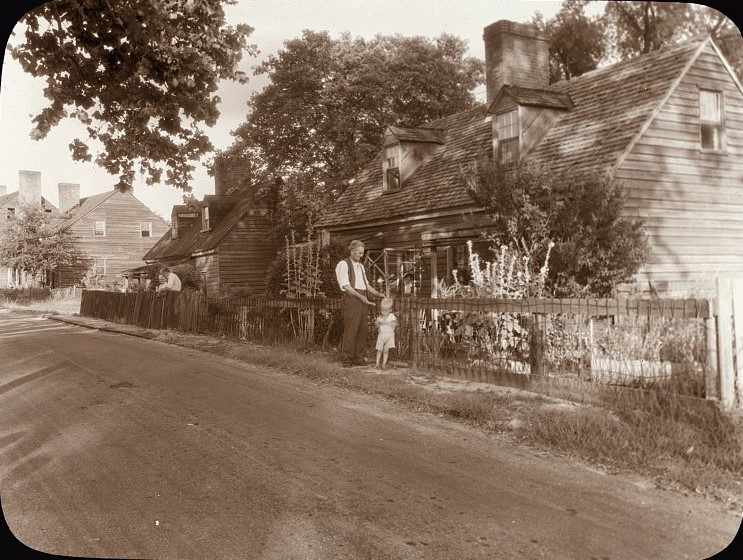
'On Ettricks' Appomattox River, by Frances Benjamin Johnston, 1933

Ettrick was named around 1765 by the foreign merchant Neil Buchanan, who dubbed the eventual village Ettrick Banks for its similarities to his native Ettrick area of Selkirk, Scotland.

Capt. Christopher Newport led expeditions in this area. Near Petersburg, which developed as an industrial city, Ettrick also developed industry. It had cotton mills, as it was on the Fall Line and could use water power.

During the American Civil War, the Confederate Army established a large hospital here. In the late nineteenth century, the biracial state legislature established the first state-supported black college, founded here in 1882 as Virginia Normal and Collegiate Institute (now Virginia State University). John Mercer Langston, who founded the Law School at Howard University, was its first president. He was elected as a US Congressman from Virginia from here. Vawter Hall and Old President's House was listed on the National Register of Historic Places in 1980.

One of the longstanding landmarks is Campbell's Bridge, first built around 1810. It has been reconstructed several times and is the only direct thoroughfare from the village across the river into Petersburg.

== Ettrick today ==
Currently there is an active Historical Society, gathering for many annual events including a "Burns Night", which celebrates the life's works of the Scottish poet Robert Burns. The evening includes a traditional dinner of haggis. Heritage Day is observed every second Saturday in April, complete with pipe and drums, food, clans, and Native American, Civil War, and pirate re-enactors.

== Geography ==
Ettrick is located at 37°14′34″N 77°25′32″W (37.242750, −77.425418).

According to the United States Census Bureau, the CDP has a total area of 3.0 square miles (7.8 km^{2}), of which 2.9 square miles (7.6 km^{2}) is land and 0.08 square miles (0.2 km^{2}), or 2.48%, is water.

== Demographics ==
Historical population
Census	Pop.	Note	%±
1980	4,890		—
1990	5,290		8.2%
2000	5,627		6.4%
2010	6,682		18.7%
2020	7,241		8.4%
U.S. Decennial Census; 2010 2020

=== Racial and ethnic composition ===
Ettrick CDP, Virginia – Racial and ethnic composition Note: the US Census treats Hispanic/Latino as an ethnic category. This table excludes Latinos from the racial categories and assigns them to a separate category. Hispanics/Latinos may be of any race.
Race / Ethnicity (NH = Non-Hispanic)	Pop 2000	Pop 2010	Pop 2020	% 2000	% 2010	% 2020
White alone (NH)	1,183	1,115	1,572	21.02%	16.69%	21.71%
Black or African American alone (NH)	4,187	5,160	4,957	74.41%	77.22%	68.46%
Native American or Alaska Native alone (NH)	18	16	19	0.32%	0.24%	0.26%
Asian alone (NH)	28	21	89	0.50%	0.31%	1.23%
Native Hawaiian or Pacific Islander alone (NH)	5	0	2	0.09%	0.00%	0.03%
Other race alone (NH)	5	13	31	0.09%	0.19%	0.43%
Mixed race or Multiracial (NH)	76	164	299	1.35%	2.45%	4.13%
Hispanic or Latino (any race)	125	193	272	2.22%	2.89%	3.76%
Total	5,627	6,682	7,241	100.00%	100.00%	100.00%

=== 2000 Census ===
As of the census of 2000, there were 5,627 people, 1,517 households, and 989 families residing in the CDP. The population density was 1,884.0 people per square mile (726.6/km^{2}). There were 1,673 housing units at an average density of 560.1/sq mi (216.0/km^{2}). The racial makeup of the CDP was 21.49% White, 75.14% African American, 0.32% Native American, 0.52% Asian, 0.09% Pacific Islander, 1.00% from other races, and 1.46% from two or more races. Hispanic or Latino of any race were 2.22% of the population.

There were 1,517 households, out of which 32.3% had children under the age of 18 living with them, 38.4% were married couples living together, 20.9% had a female householder with no husband present, and 34.8% were non-families. 26.0% of all households were made up of individuals, and 8.8% had someone living alone who was 65 years of age or older. The average household size was 2.51 and the average family size was 3.03.

In the CDP, the population was spread out, with 17.6% under the age of 18, 40.1% from 18 to 24, 20.6% from 25 to 44, 13.0% from 45 to 64, and 8.7% who were 65 years of age or older. The median age was 22 years. For every 100 females, there were 78.6 males. For every 100 females age 18 and over, there were 74.2 males.

The median income for a household in the CDP was $38,470, and the median income for a family was $43,357. Males had a median income of $33,241 versus $28,134 for females. The per capita income for the CDP was $13,251. About 6.7% of families and 11.2% of the population were below the poverty line, including 8.2% of those under age 18 and 6.8% of those age 65 or over.

== Education ==
Chesterfield County Public Schools is the school district for the whole county, including Ettrick. https://ettrickes.oneccps.org/ is in the CDP.

Most of Virginia State University is in Ettrick CDP.

== Notable people ==
- Robert Prentiss Daniel, born in Ettrick; African-American educator and college administrator, president of Virginia State University for 18 years
- James Farrior, plays for the Pittsburgh Steelers in the NFL and holds two Super Bowl rings
- Rudi Johnson, former All Pro running back for the Cincinnati Bengals in the NFL
- John Mercer Langston, first president of Virginia State University in 1882 and US Congressman from Virginia
- Lennie Pond, NASCAR Rookie of the year was born in Ettrick
- Robert 'Bob' Eanes, Chesterfield County's first Fire Chief. Born Ettrick.
