= Boyd House (University of Oklahoma) =

Historic house in Oklahoma, United States

- President's House, University of Oklahoma
- U.S. National Register of Historic Places
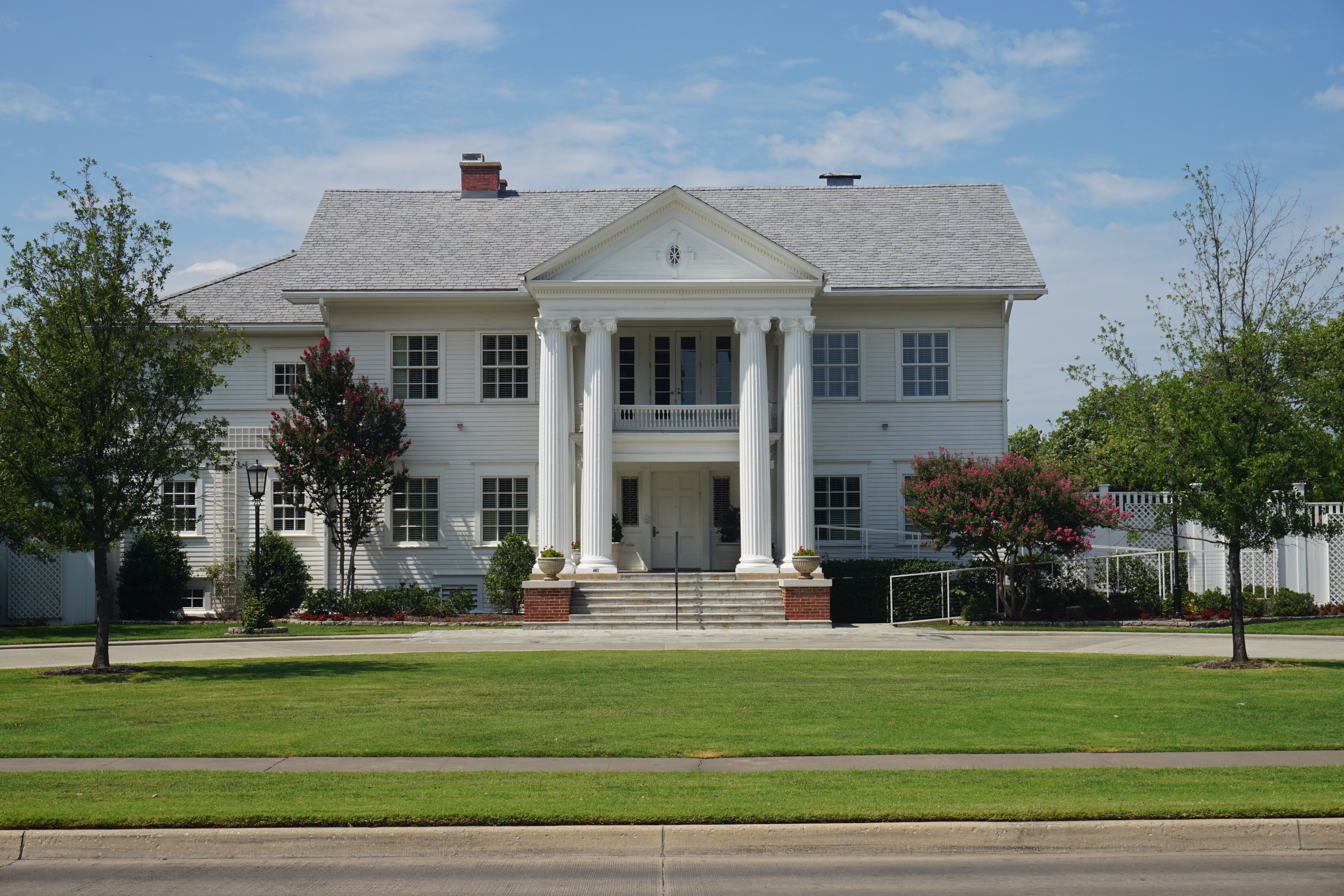
- Boyd House as viewed from Boyd Street

- Location within Oklahoma Location within the United States
- Location: 407 W. Boyd Street, Norman, Oklahoma
- Coordinates: 35°12′42″N 97°26′46″W
- Built: 1906
- Architect: David Ross Boyd
- Architectural style: Classical Revival
- NRHP reference No.: 76001558
- Added to NRHP: July 6, 1976

Boyd House, also known as the President's House and the OU White House, is the official residence of the president of the University of Oklahoma. The university's president, currently Joseph Harroz Jr., lives in Boyd House as a primary residence free of charge. In 1976, it was listed on the National Register of Historic Places as "President's House, University of Oklahoma".

== History ==
The house that came to be known as Boyd House was built in 1906 by OU's first president, David Ross Boyd, for approximately $7,000. In 1908, Boyd was forced out as university president. He leased the property to the university until 1914, when OU acquired it from Boyd in a property swap. Seven subsequent university presidents lived in the house. Stratton D. Brooks, the university's third president, remodeled the house over a period of seven years between 1915, and 1922 into its current Neoclassical Revival style, paying for its four Ionic columns out of his own pocket.

The house had no formal name; it was known as "The President's House", "The White House", or by the name of the occupant, i.e. "The Bizzell House". It hosted numerous significant historical figures, including Sir Alexander Fleming, John Philip Sousa, William Howard Taft, Harry S. Truman, and Niels Bohr.

In 1969 J. Herbert Hollomon, the university's eighth president, moved into a newer residence off campus that was purchased by the university for his use, and his successors continued to live in the same house. The old building sat vacant until 1971, when it became office space. It was used as the university's visitor center from 1979 to 1994. It was officially named Boyd House in 1982.

As a condition of his employment by the university, then-incoming OU president David L. Boren insisted on living in Boyd House. Boyd House reopened as the official presidential residence in November 1996 following a $2 million privately funded renovation and expansion.
