= President's House (Bluefield State College) =

Historic house in West Virginia, United States

- President's House, Bluefield State University
- U.S. National Register of Historic Places
- Location within West Virginia Location within the United States
- Location: Rock Street, Bluefield, West Virginia
- Coordinates: 37°16′05″N 81°14′09″W
- Architect: Garry & Sheffey; McMullen & Dye
- Architectural style: Colonial Revival
- NRHP reference No.: 99001400
- Added to NRHP: December 3, 1999

President's House, also referred to as Hatter Hall, is a historic home located on the campus of Bluefield State University at Bluefield, West Virginia. It was built in 1930 and named after President Hamilton Hatter, and is a brick, 2 1/2-story, Colonial Revival-style dwelling. It has one bay side wings and a hipped roof. Also on the property is a stone garage. The house was used as the residence for the college president until 1966.

It was listed on the National Register of Historic Places in 1999.
