= Vawter Hall and Old President's House =

Historic buildings in Virginia, US

- U.S. National Register of Historic Places
- Virginia Landmarks Register
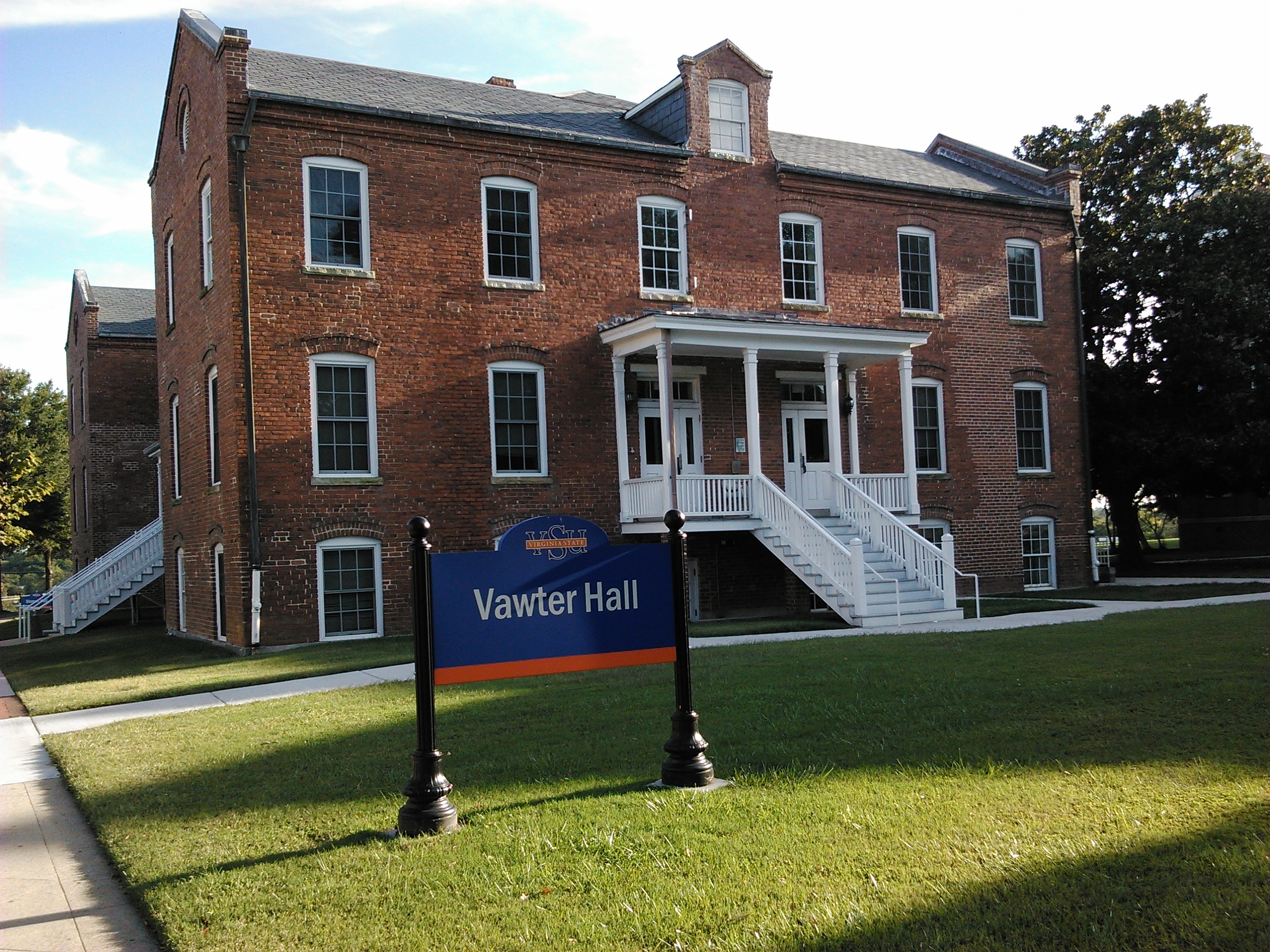
- Vawter Hall

- Location within Virginia Location within the United States
- Location: Virginia State University campus, Ettrick, Virginia
- Coordinates: 37°14′4″N 77°25′5″W
- Area: 3 acres (1.2 ha)
- Built: 1907
- Architectural style: Queen Anne
- NRHP reference No.: 80004180
- VLR No.: 020-5247

Significant dates
- Added to NRHP: May 07, 1980
- Designated VLR: February 19, 1980

Vawter Hall and the Old President's House are two of the oldest buildings at Virginia State University, the oldest state-supported college for blacks in the United States. Vawter Hall was built and named in 1908 in honor of the school's late rector and authority on industrial training, Charles E. Vawter. The school was originally chartered as the Virginia Normal and Collegiate Institute in 1882, created through an agreement with the Readjuster Party to found a state-supported school of higher learning for blacks.

It was listed on the National Register of Historic Places in 1980.
