= President's House (Columbia University) =

Coordinates: 40°48′23″N 73°57′34″W

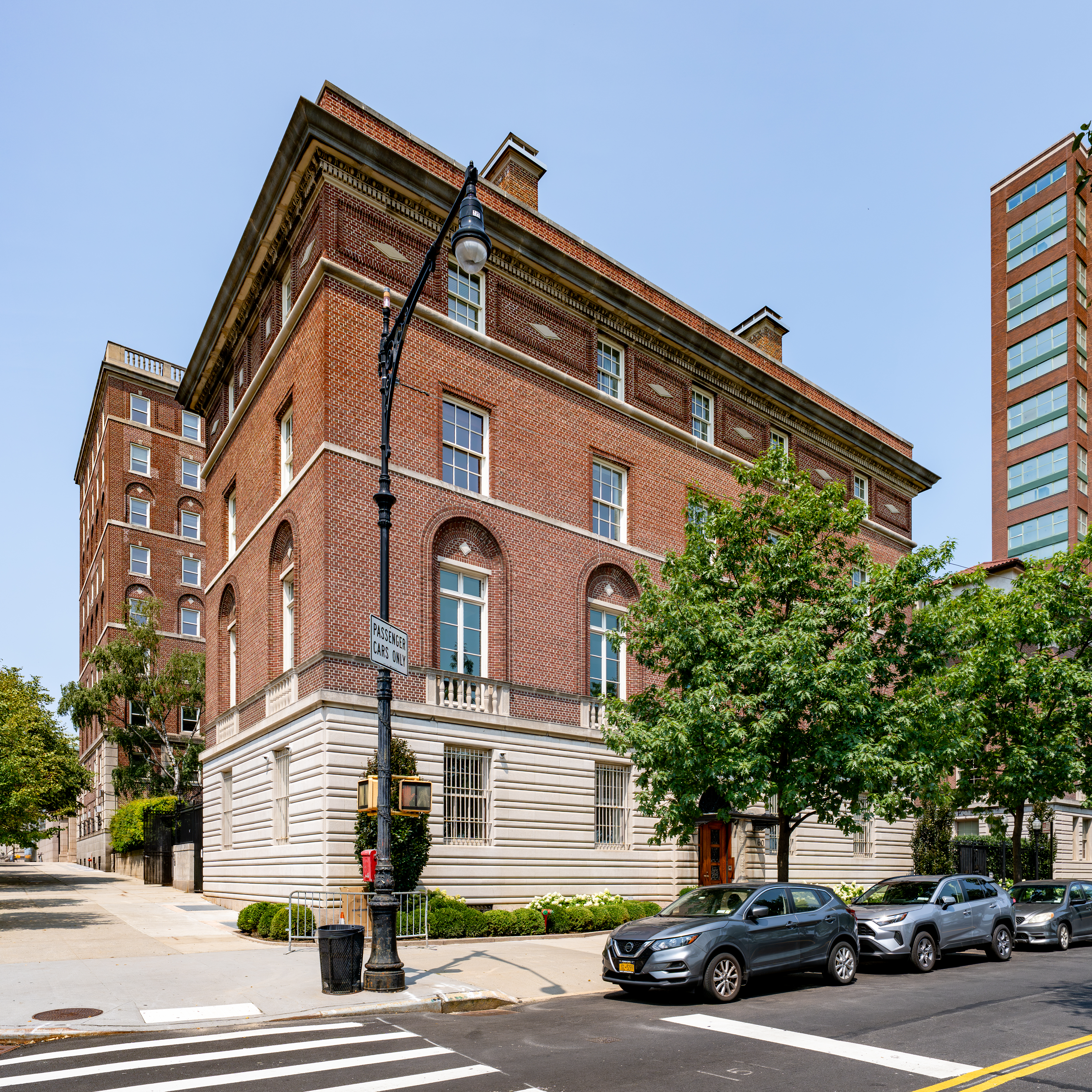
The Columbia University President's House at 60 Morningside Drive

The President's House at Columbia University is located at the intersection of 116th Street and Morningside Drive, on the university's Morningside Heights campus in Manhattan, New York City. Built in 1912 by McKim, Mead & White, it is the official residence of the president of Columbia University. It was first occupied by Nicholas Murray Butler, and with the exception of acting President Frank D. Fackenthal and President Michael Sovern, it has been the residence of every university president since its construction.

== History ==
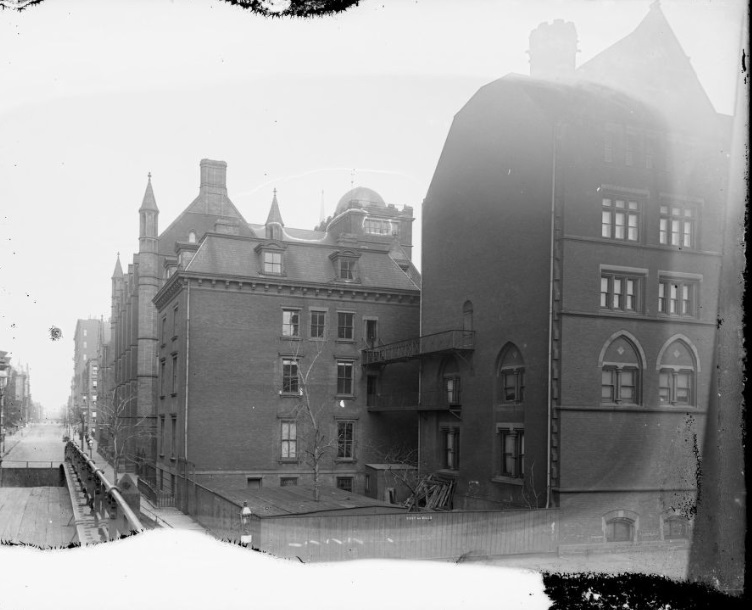
The President's House (1862–1897) at Columbia's midtown campus

At Columbia's midtown campus, where it was located from 1857 to 1897, a house for the president was built in 1862 near the corner of 49th Street and Fourth Avenue (later Park Avenue). It served as the home of both Charles King and Frederick Augustus Porter Barnard. It was the president's official residence until that campus's demolition.

A new official residence for the university president was originally planned upon the university's relocation from its former campus on Madison Avenue to its current location in Morningside Heights in 1897. Original designs for the campus layout by McKim, Mead & White included such a residence, either as a freestanding building or as part of an administration building. However, the building was not considered a priority for Columbia until 1909, when the university acquired the land for East Campus, on which the house is located. The plot was originally imagined as a new campus for the College of Physicians and Surgeons, though it was eventually decided that the president's residence would be built there through the efforts of Nicholas Murray Butler, out of a desire either not to live directly on campus or to take advantage of the view of Harlem from the site. Butler occupied the house for 33 years, and yielded it to incoming president Dwight D. Eisenhower, two years after his resignation.

Under Eisenhower, the house was run by his wife, Mamie Eisenhower, dubbed the "first lady" of Columbia University by Martin Teasley. The fifth floor penthouse, which was formerly used as a storage space, was converted to a studio for his amateur painting. The house served as Eisenhower's campaign headquarters during his 1952 presidential campaign. This decision drew criticism from some, including dean of the School of Journalism Carl W. Ackerman, who claimed that it made it appear as if Columbia had endorsed Eisenhower as an institution, and that the university was inadvertently funding his campaign by paying for the house's maintenance.

During the tenures of Frank D. Fackenthal and Michael I. Sovern, the President's House was unoccupied, with the latter opting instead to live in his Upper East Side apartment. The house, however, was still used to entertain guests of the university, became the residence of the sitting president again with the accession of President George Erik Rupp in 1993. Beginning under Rupp, and finishing during the tenure of Lee Bollinger, the house underwent a $23 million renovation.
