= President's House (Clemson University) =

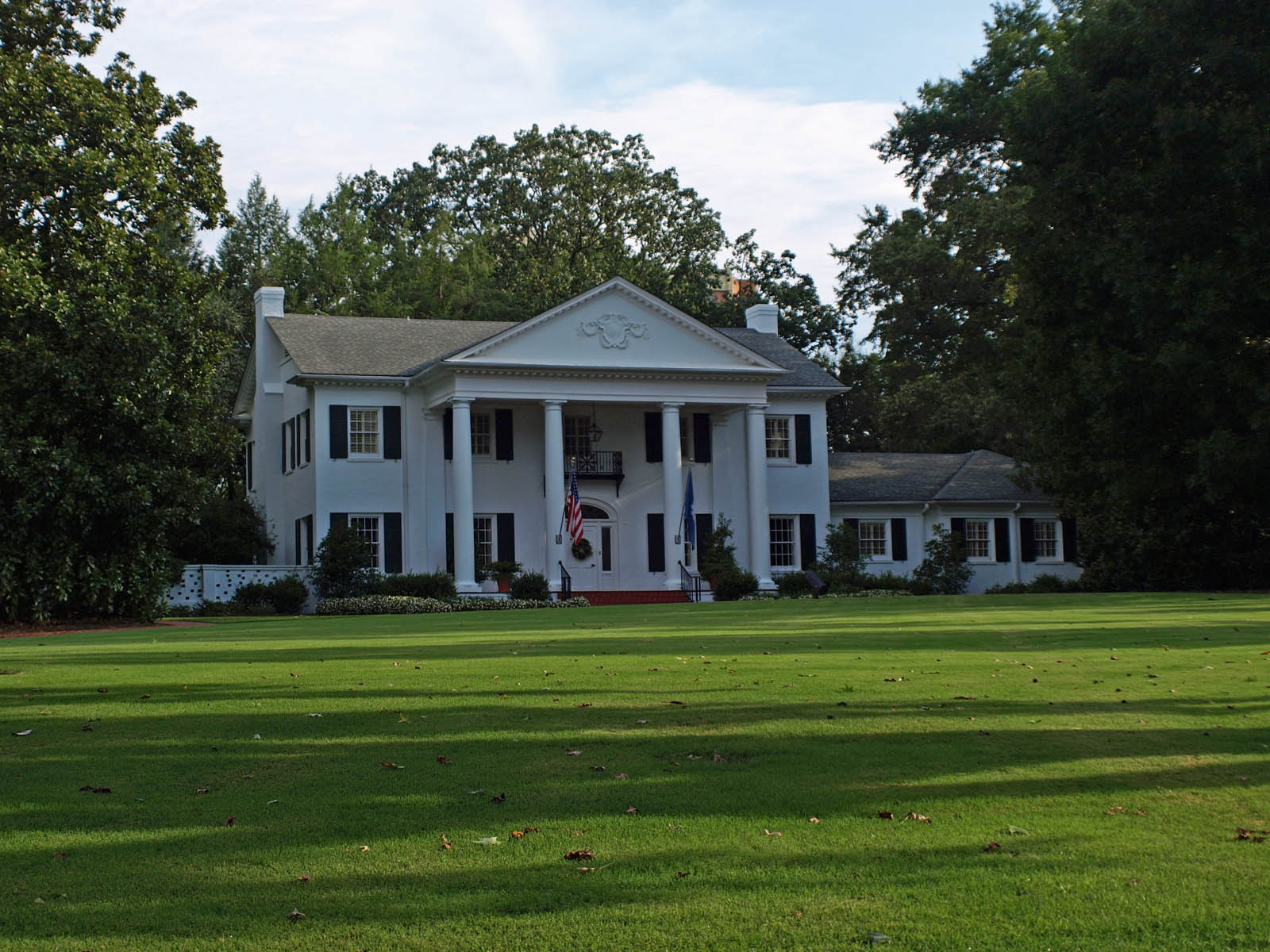
- President's House on Cherry Rd
- Interactive map of the President's House area

General information
- Type: President Home
- Location: Clemson University
- Coordinates: 34.678404°N 82.830950°W
- Completed: 1959

The President's House was built in 1959 to serve as the living quarters for the president at Clemson University in Clemson, South Carolina, USA. It has been the home to eight different Clemson presidents and is a key location on the university's campus. This is especially the case for new and incoming students because at the beginning of each year, new students are invited to a picnic on the president's lawn in front of the house. This gives students the chance to meet the president for the first time.

The house is located at 120 Cherry Road in Clemson. When arriving at campus from I-85 (SC) it is the first building people see. At night, the building has an image projected on to it in Clemson orange of the Tiger Paw logo.

== President's home ==
Built in 1959 to match the design of the Fort Hill Plantation, the mansion is approximately 7,553 square feet (701.7 m^{2}). The project, which was funded by the university, was built for the then president, Robert C Edwards, by the architects Charles W Fant & Sons Construction Company. The project was finished in fall 1959 and has been the home to every president of Clemson University since. The home has undergone construction in 1976 and 1998.

== Old president's home ==
The original president's home was completed in 1893. Built by Clemson's first president, Strode, Craighead was the first to actually live in the house. The second, third and fourth presidents of Clemson lived in this house, until Walter M. Riggs refused to leave his new, lavish home, for the designated president's house. After Riggs declined the offer to move into the president's house, the building was converted to Mell Apartments. In all, the Riggs’ house was an interim presidential residence for three Clemson presidents (Riggs, Sikes and Poole). During these years, it was considered faculty housing.

Mrs. Poole continued to live in the Riggs' house, even after her husband died. The following president, R. C. Edwards, moved into what is now the President's House. Shortly after Mrs. Poole died, the Riggs' house was torn down.
