= President's House (University of Florida) =

Earl and Christy Powell University House (Former President's House)
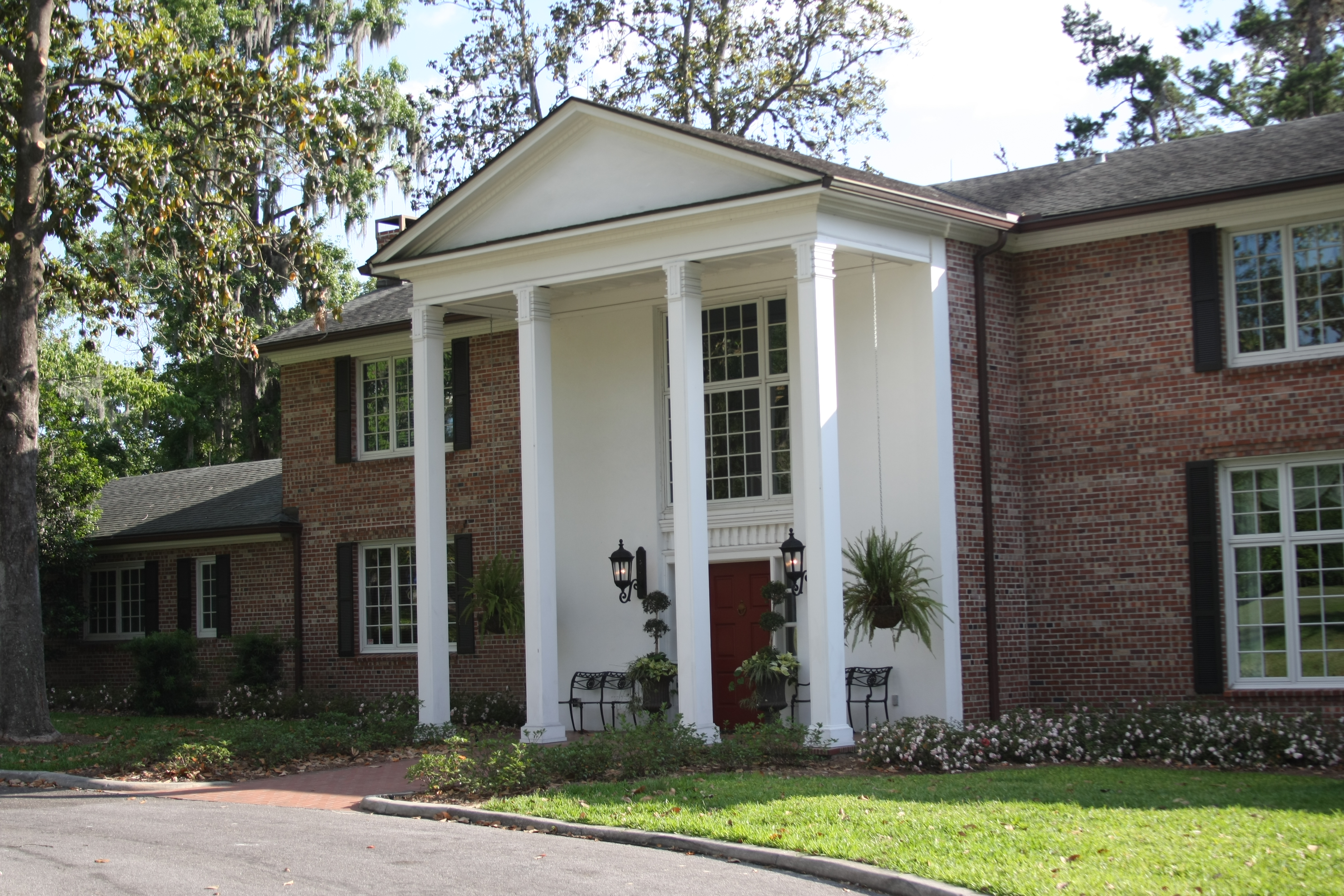
- Interactive map of the Earl and Christy Powell University House (Former President's House) area

General information
- Type: Housing and Alumni Relations
- Location: Main campus, University of Florida, Gainesville, Florida, United States
- Coordinates: 29.651159°N 82.353693°W
- Completed: 1953

Website
- Official website

The President's House was built in 1953 and served as the primary residence for every University of Florida president until 2006, when President Bernie Machen chose to relocate to a private residence off campus. It was replaced in 2015 with the Dasburg House which is the current residence of the President of UF. It was re-named Earl and Christy Powell University House. The facility now is open to UF organizations and groups that want to entertain, meet or hold a retreat there.
