= President's House, Marion Institute =

- U.S. National Register of Historic Places
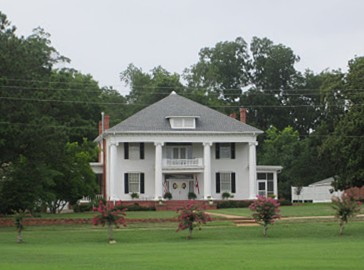

- Location within Alabama
- Location: 110 Brown St., Marion, Alabama
- Coordinates: 32°37′30″N 87°19′13″W
- Area: 1.9 acres (0.77 ha)
- Built: 1912
- Architectural style: Classical Revival
- NRHP reference No.: 79000401
- Added to NRHP: May 14, 1979

Constructed in 1912, it was built during the presidency of Hopson O. Murfee, the second president of the institute and son of the founder, James T. Murfee. The President's House, Marion Institute was listed on the National Register of Historic Places in 1979.

It is a two-story frame residence at Marion Military Institute.
