= President's House (Gallaudet College) =

Historic house in Washington, D.C., United States

- President's House, Gallaudet College
- U.S. National Register of Historic Places
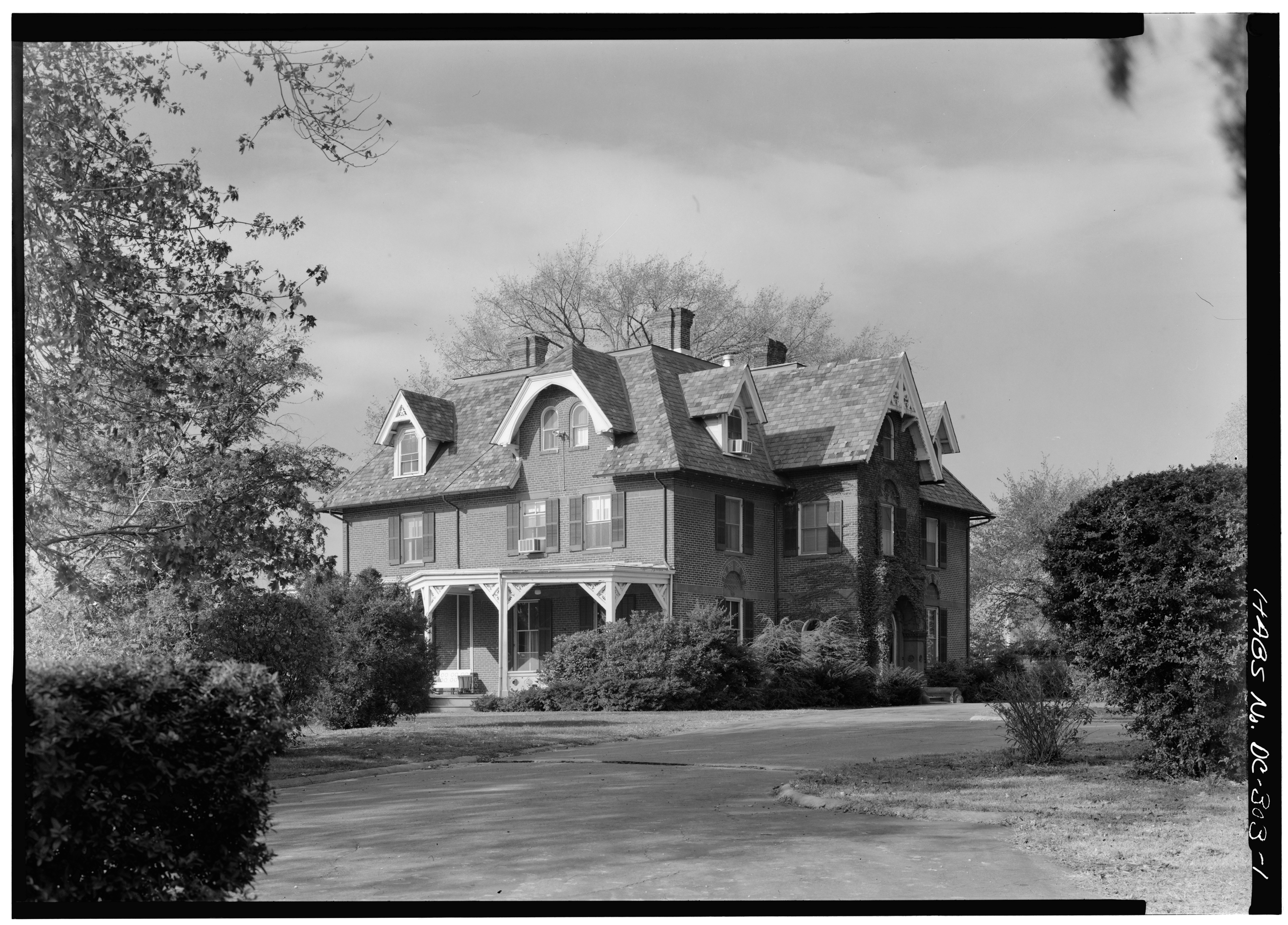

- Location within Washington, D.C.
- Location: 7th St. and Florida Ave., NE., Washington, D.C.
- Coordinates: 38°54′22″N 76°59′50″W
- Built: 1868
- Architect: Frederick Clarke Withers
- Architectural style: High Victorian Gothic
- NRHP reference No.: 74002172
- Added to NRHP: February 15, 1974

The President's House is a historic residence that was built in 1868. It is on the campus of Gallaudet University in Washington, D.C. On campus, it is known as the Edward Miner Gallaudet Residence, after the university's first president, who was the first to occupy the house. Commonly known as House 1 It is a 35-room High Victorian Gothic mansion. It was listed on the National Register of Historic Places in 1974. The house has continuously served as the residence for the university's president, making it closely tied to the leadership and development of Gallaudet University.

Architecture and Construction

The President's house was built using detailed construction plans developed in 1866, which emphasized the use of strong, high quality materials such as brick, stone, and slate. The building features thick masonry walls, a solid stone foundation, and a slate roof, all designed to ensure durability and long term use. The design reflects the high Victorian Gothic style, combining structural strength and decorative detail.

Construction documents show that careful attention was given to features such as drainage systems, window and door framings, and interior supports, highlighting the level of planning.

== See also ==
- Gallaudet College Historic District
