= Harbison College President's Home =

Historic house in South Carolina, United States

- U.S. National Register of Historic Places
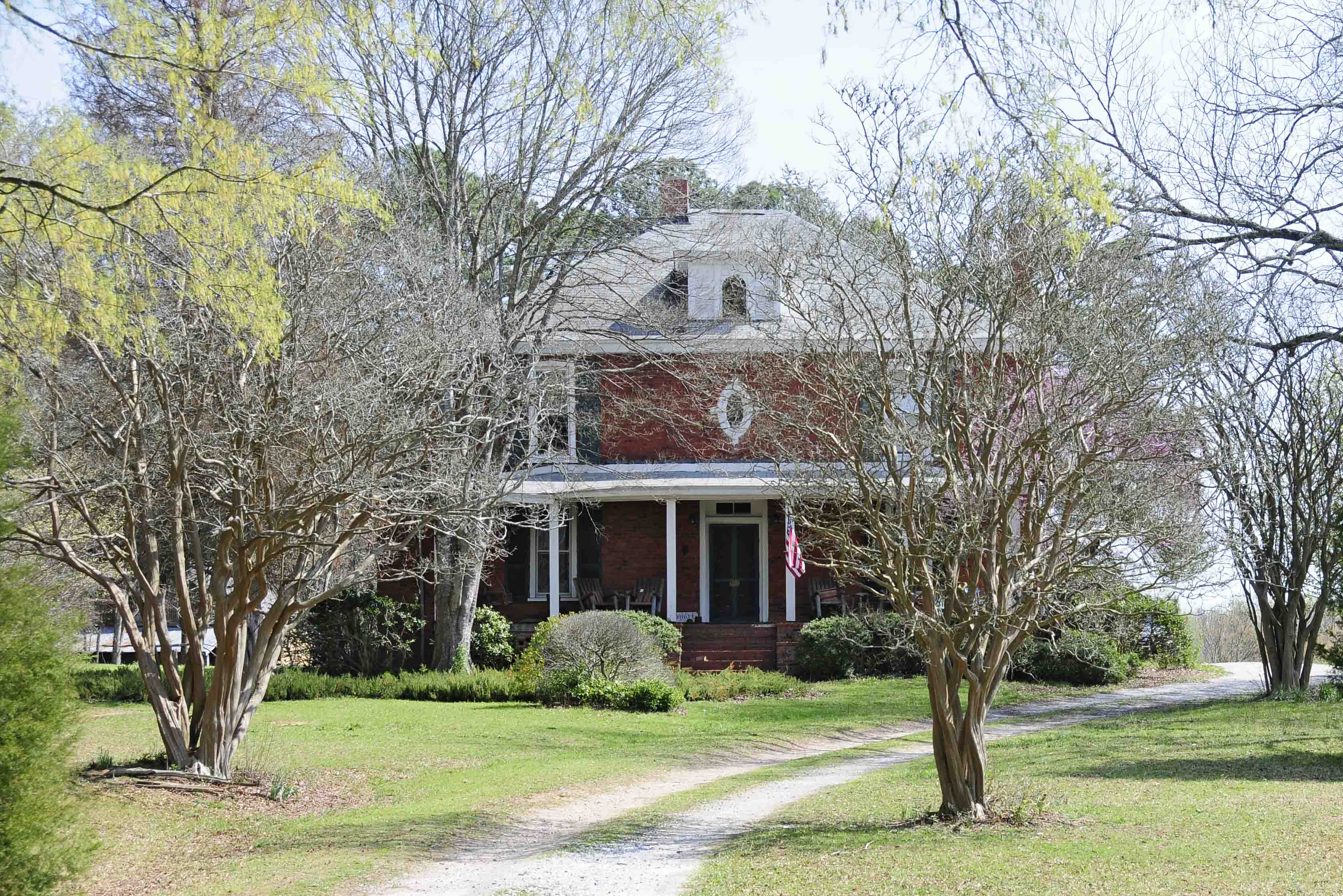

- Location within South Carolina Location within the United States
- Nearest city: Abbeville, South Carolina
- Coordinates: 34°11′45″N 82°23′5″W
- Area: 3 acres (1.2 ha)
- Built: 1906
- NRHP reference No.: 83002181
- Added to NRHP: January 13, 1983

The Harbison College President's Home near Abbeville, South Carolina was built in 1906. It was listed on the National Register of Historic Places in 1983.
