= Brandeis University President's House =

Historic house in Massachusetts, United States

- U.S. National Register of Historic Places
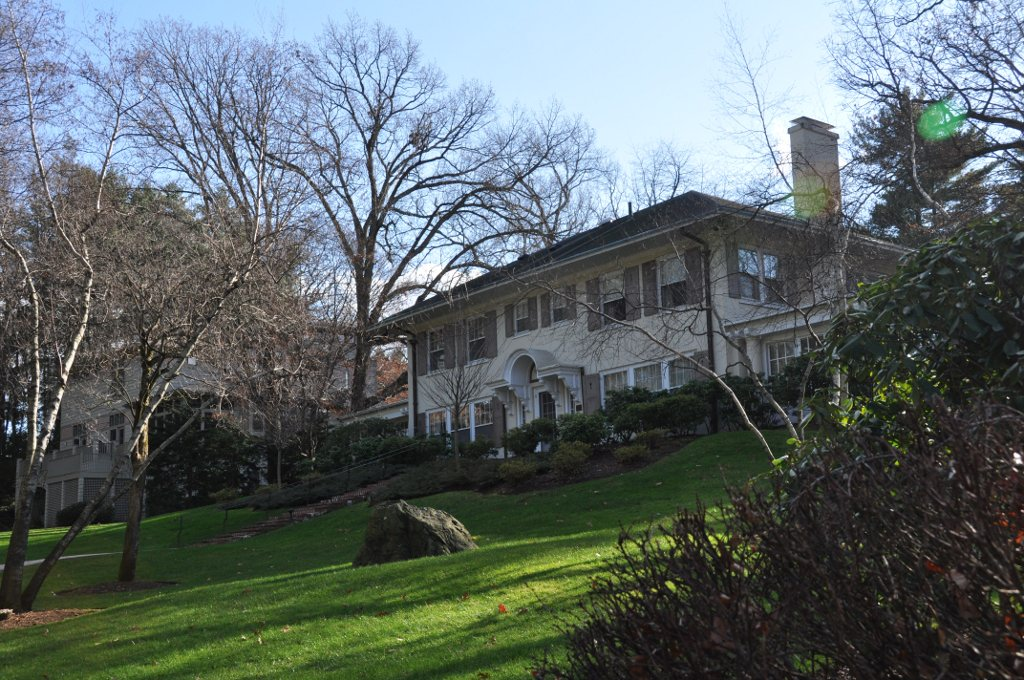

- Location within Massachusetts Location within the United States
- Location: 66 Beaumont Avenue, Newton, Massachusetts
- Coordinates: 42.3417689°N 71.2105884°W
- Area: 35,000 square feet (3,300 m^{2})
- Built: 1919; 107 years ago
- Architect: Dudley, W. Northrop
- Architectural style: Bungalow/Craftsman
- NRHP reference No.: 98000990
- Added to NRHP: August 19, 1998

The Brandeis University President's House, also known as the Leland Powers House, is an historic house on 66 Beaumont Avenue in Newton, Massachusetts. Built in 1913–14 for Leland Powers, it is a prominent large-scale example of American Craftsman architecture. It has served as the official residence of two presidents of Brandeis University as well as Roger Berkowitz, the CEO of Legal Sea Foods. The house was listed on the National Register of Historic Places in 1998.

== Description ==
The house stands in a subdivision known as Grove Hill Park, on the south side of the village of Newtonville. It is set at the northeast corner of Beaumont and Prospect streets, amid other houses of similar scale. It is a two-story L-shaped structure, oriented with its main facade to the north, presenting a side to Beaumont Street and the house rear to Prospect. It is covered by a hip roof with broad raking eaves, under which rafters are exposed. The main facade has bands of windows on either side of the center entrance, which has sidelight windows articulated by brackets supporting a projecting cornice, which transitions to a half-round shape that houses a transom window. The exterior is finished in stucco applied over rubble stone walls. The interior is decorated with Arts and Crafts features.

== History ==
The house was built in 1913–14 as the residence of Leland Powers. Powers, at the time a state legislator, was active in legislating against the rise of anarchist activity. The house was severely damaged by an anarchist bomb attack in 1919. Powers' family moved out of the house in 1921.

Brandeis University bought the house in 1948, the same year as its founding, in order to serve as the home of its first president, Abram L. Sachar. During Sachar's residence, the house was a center of entertainment related to the university, hosting high-profile guests.

Brandeis University sold the house in 1992 to Roger Berkowitz, the chief executive of Legal Sea Foods. The university repurchased the house in 1994 in order to serve as the official residence of Jehuda Reinharz, its seventh president. The university sold the house again in 2012.

== See also ==
- National Register of Historic Places listings in Newton, Massachusetts
