= List of university and college presidents' houses =

This is a list of official residences of university and college presidents.

== Canada ==
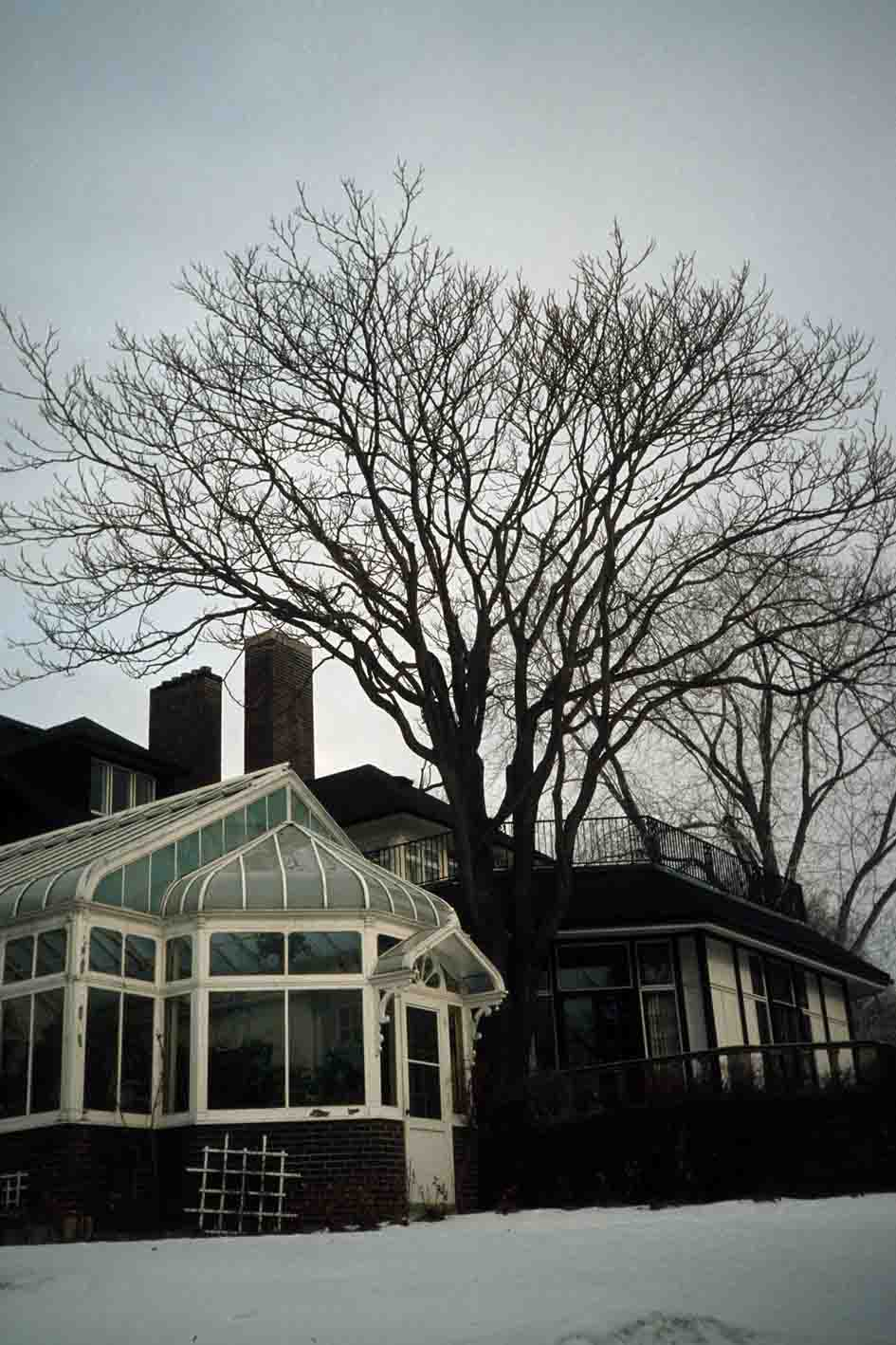
Main house and conservatory for the president of the University of Toronto

- 93 Highland Avenue, University of Toronto
