= Nason House =

- University President's House
- U.S. National Register of Historic Places
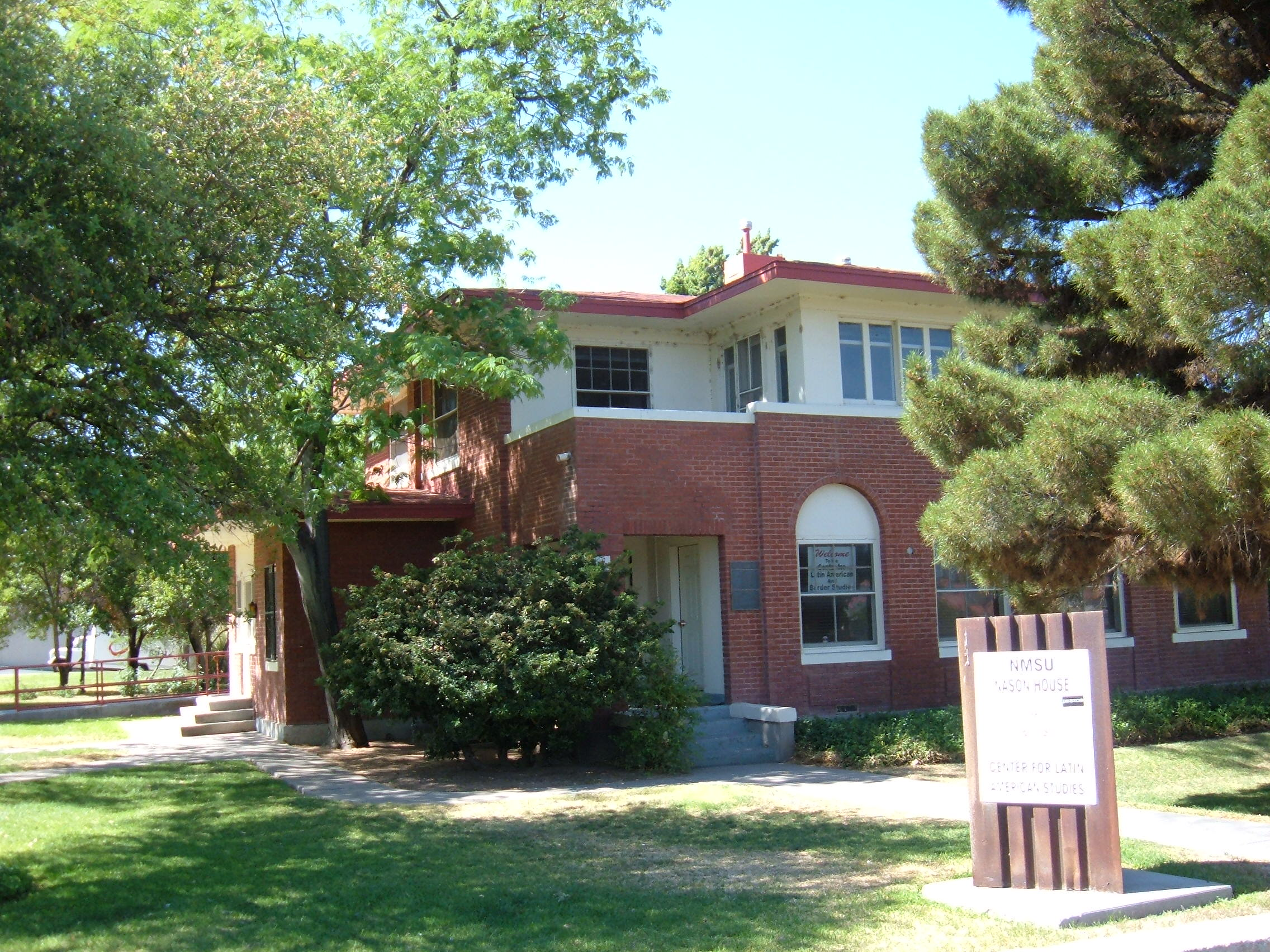

- Location within New Mexico Location within the United States
- Location: South of University Avenue between Espina and Solano, NMSU, Las Cruces, New Mexico
- Coordinates: 32°17′02″N 106°45′16″W
- Area: 0.1 acres (0.040 ha)
- Built: 1918
- Architectural style: Prairie School
- MPS: New Mexico Campus Buildings Built 1906-1937 TR
- NRHP reference No.: 88001549
- Added to NRHP: May 16, 1989

The Nason House, formerly the University President's House, is a historic house in Las Cruces, New Mexico, U.S. It was constructed as the official residence of the president of New Mexico State University. It was built on the NMSU campus in 1918. It was designed in the Prairie School architectural style. It has been listed on the National Register of Historic Places since May 16, 1989.

In 1980, a new residence was constructed for the University president, and this structure was refurbished to accommodate the Center for Latin American and Border Studies. In 1987, the building was renamed, dedicating it to Willoughby Nason, a university graduate student who died in 1979 before completing his thesis.
