= Agricultural Engineering Building =

Historic building in Wisconsin, U.S.

- U.S. National Register of Historic Places
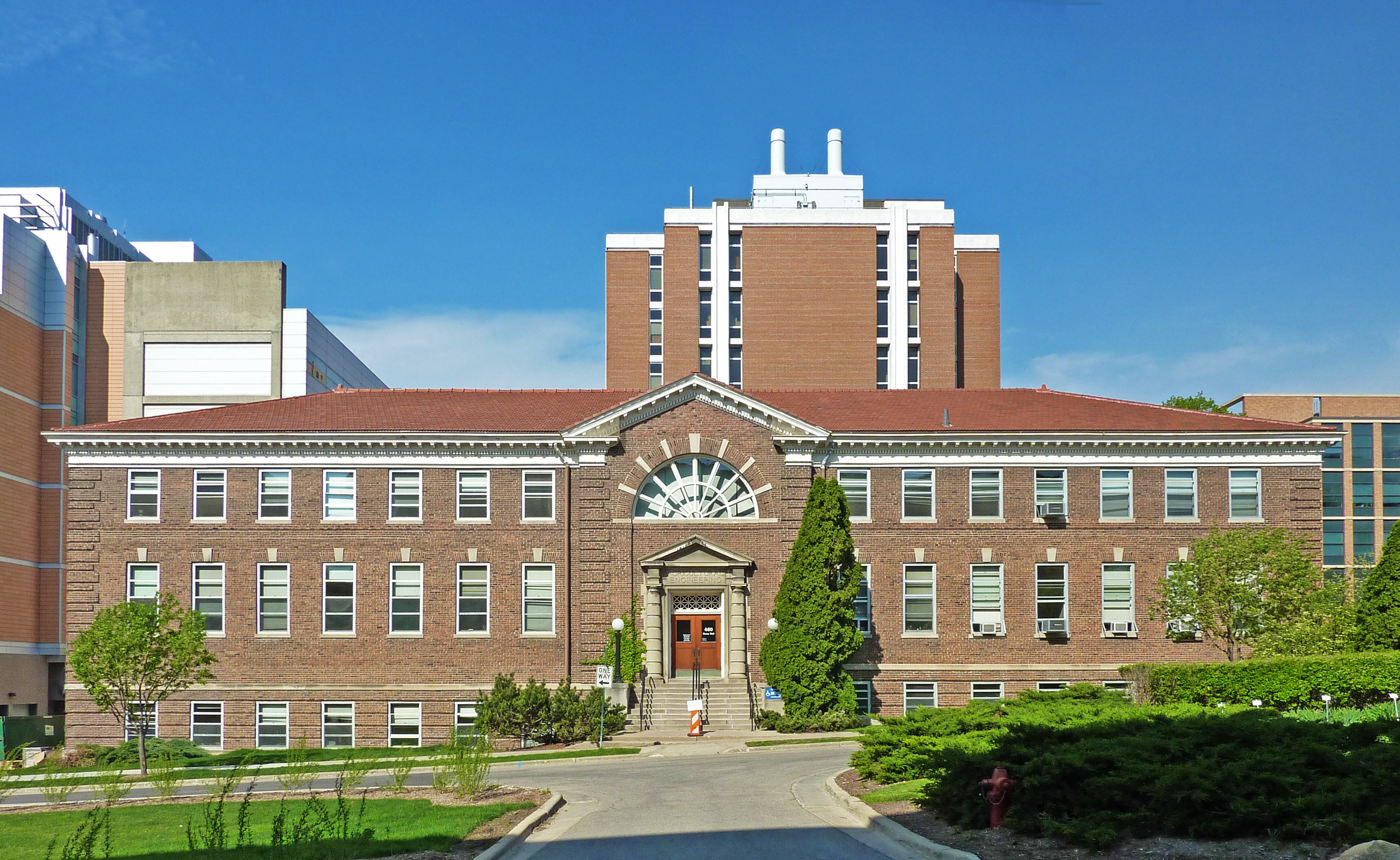
- Agricultural Engineering Building
- Location: 460 Henry Mall; Madison, Wisconsin
- Coordinates: 43°04′29″N 89°24′38″W
- Built: 1905–1907
- Architect: Arthur Peabody
- Architectural style: Colonial Revival/Georgian Revival
- NRHP reference No.: 85001404
- Added to NRHP: June 27, 1985

The Agricultural Engineering Building is a historic 1907 building in Madison, Wisconsin, which houses the Biological Systems Engineering Department (formerly Agricultural Engineering) of the University of Wisconsin–Madison. Over the years the building hosted important investigations into soil erosion, improvements on the first forage harvester, and Aldo Leopold's new Department of Wildlife Management, among other milestones. In 1985 the building was added to the National Register of Historic Places, and is now part of the Henry Mall Historic District.

The UW's College of Agriculture was founded in 1889, focusing in its first decades on research and sharing practical applications of that research with the state's farmers. The college pioneered the twelve-week Short Course in Agriculture and the Dairy Course, and various buildings were constructed before this one, including King Hall, the Dairy Barn, and Agriculture Hall.

The Department of Agricultural Engineering was established in 1904 to design "farm apparatus... developed from ongoing research conducted by the College of Agriculture." The new department's building was completed in 1907, designed by Arthur Peabody, the UW's new supervising architect. Peabody was a native son of Wisconsin, born in Eau Claire, who would go on over the next thirty years to design many of the UW's structures including the Stock Pavilion, the Field House at Camp Randall, and Memorial Union.

Peabody designed Agricultural Engineering a 2-story structure 45 by 150 feet, topped with a red-tiled hip roof. The style is Georgian Revival, with brick walls with quoins on the corners, first floor windows decorated with keystones, and a modillioned cornice. Entrances are through centered bays beneath large fanlight windows framed by pediments with cornice returns. Peabody designed the exterior to harmonize with the nearby Agricultural Journalism and Biochemistry buildings. Inside, the first floor initially housed labs, shops, offices, and lecture rooms. The upper floor was an open room where machinery was displayed.

Important events occurred in the Agricultural Engineering building. In 1907, the American Society of Agricultural and Biological Engineers (ASABE, formerly ASAE) was founded in the building. Edward Richard Jones, the first head of the department, investigated soil erosion in the building, leading to ways to reduce erosion. Floyd Waldo Duffee, the second head of the department, explored rural electrification with his Ripon Experimental Electrical Line, which reached six farms. He also designed improvements on the first forage harvester and co-designed a hot-air seed corn dryer with A.H. Wright of the Agronomy department. The Dept. of Ag Engineering also developed ventilated storage buildings, large capacity trench silos, and in 1943 started the first farm safety program in the US. In 1933 Aldo Leopold's new Department of Wildlife Management was created and for its first two years was housed in the building.

The building has changed little over the years. In 1985 it was placed on the NRHP for statewide significance in the field of engineering and for local significance in the field of architecture.
