= Stock Pavilion =

- U.S. National Register of Historic Places
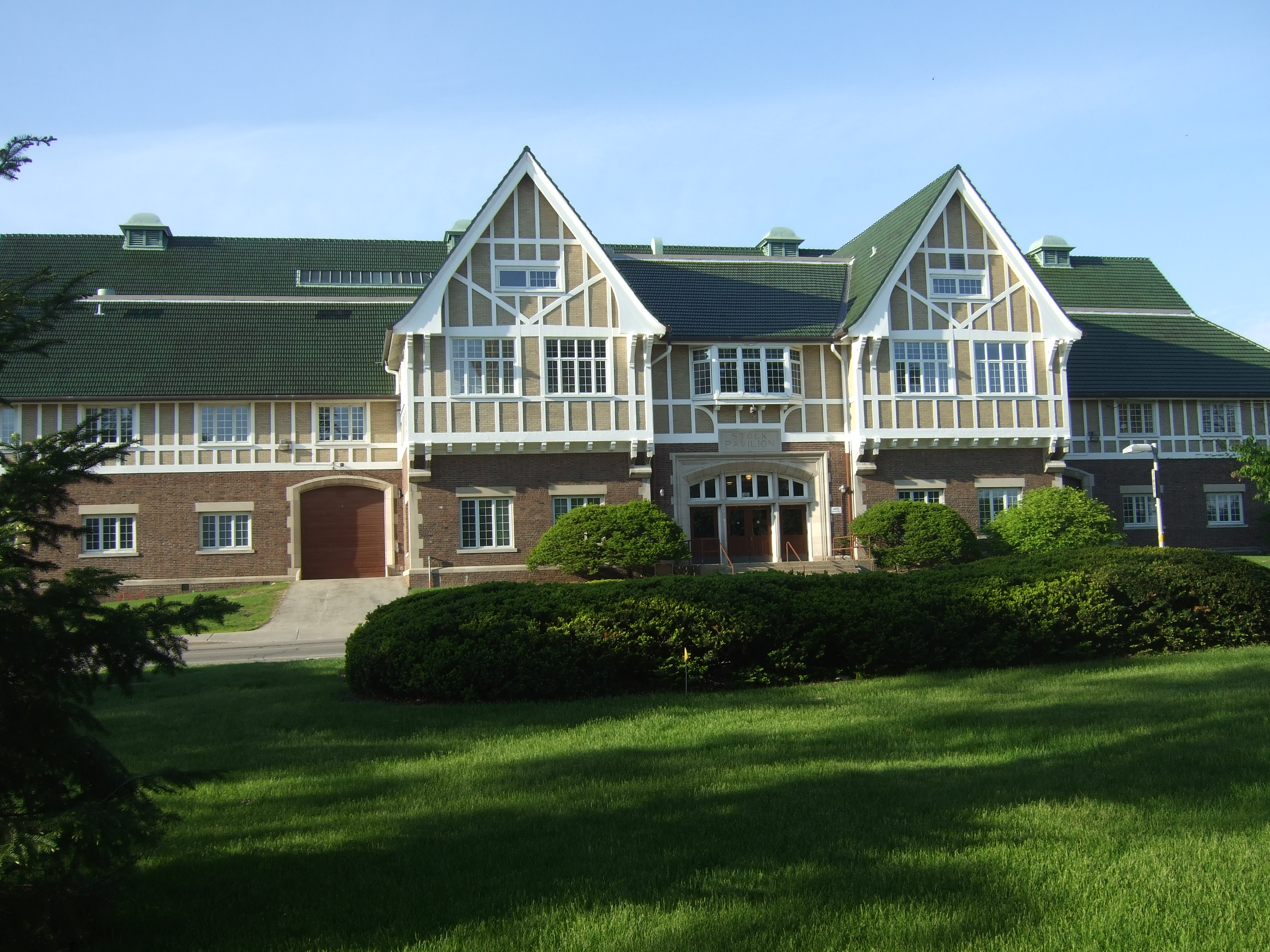
- Stock Pavilion
- Location: 1675 Linden Dr., University of Wisconsin Campus, Madison, Wisconsin
- Coordinates: 43°04′29″N 89°24′54″W
- Area: less than one acre
- Built: 1908-1909
- Architect: Warren Laird/Paul Philippe Cret/Arthur Peabody
- Architectural style: Tudor Revival
- NRHP reference No.: 85001504
- Added to NRHP: July 11, 1985

The Stock Pavilion is an exhibit hall built in 1908 at the University of Wisconsin–Madison, with its exterior styled like a medieval housebarn. In 1985 the building was added to the National Register of Historic Places for architectural significance.

== History ==
By 1900 agriculture was a big part of Wisconsin's economy. The vast majority of heavy fieldwork was still powered by horses, as tractors were just beginning to appear. Each February a big horse show and auction was held in the Dairy Barn pavilion and Agriculture Hall, but the show outgrew those venues. A committee was appointed to consider options. It included Frederick Pabst and other prominent horse breeders, and in 1906 they recommended that the legislature provide $80,000 for a new pavilion. Secretary of State Walter Houser also lobbied for the building and in 1907 the state legislature approved a special appropriation for it.

Gathering ideas for the new building, UW supervising architect Arthur Peabody and animal husbandry professor George Humphrey visited animal exhibition halls around the country. In 1908 Warren Powers Laird and Paul Philippe Cret produced a design for the pavilion and general contractor T.C. McCarthy started building it. The design was in a Tudor Revival style, suggesting a medieval housebarn with its rather steep gables and half-timbering in the upper facade. The building's footprint is 212 by 115 feet and it stands 3.5 stories high. The first story is clad in red brick, with concrete trim around the openings formed to resemble tabbed stonework. The upper walls are clad in yellow brick between false half-timbers. The roof is covered in green tiles, with vents and ribbons of skylights near the peak.

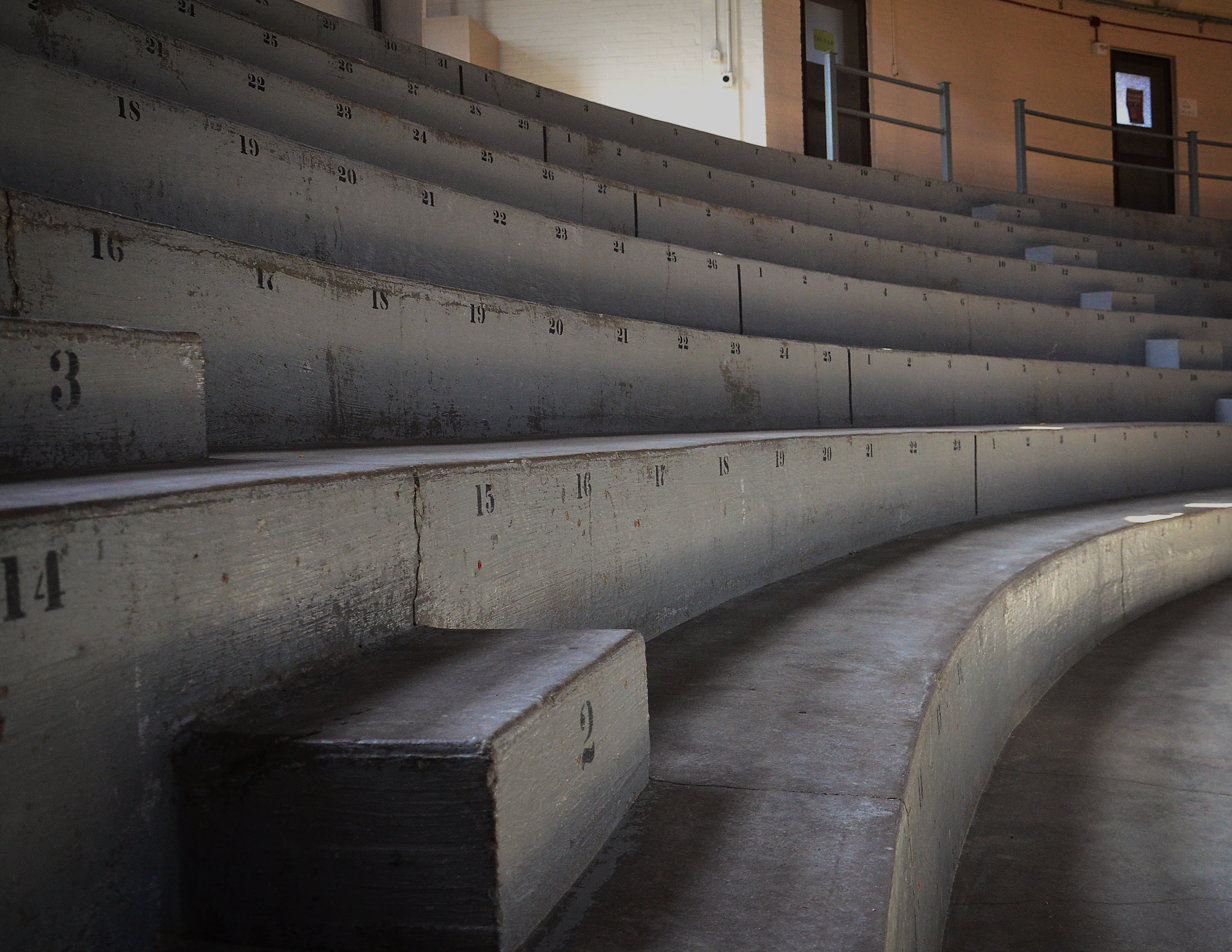
seating around the amphitheater

Inside, most of the space is taken by an elliptical earth-floored arena 164 by 66 feet. Around the arena are six tiers of concrete benches which can seat 2000 spectators. Beneath them are animal stalls and storage space. Tucked around the arena are two floors of classrooms, storage, and offices. When completed in 1908, the building won a prize as "the most desirable structure erected by any U.S. college in that year."

The pavilion was the largest auditorium in Madison from the time it was built until 1930, when the Field House was built. As such, it was used for numerous events not involving cattle, including football games, boy scout jamborees, UW commencements; concerts by Paderewski, Sergei Rachmaninoff, and the London Symphony Orchestra; and speeches by Theodore Roosevelt, William Howard Taft, Harry S. Truman, and civil rights leader Martin Luther King Jr. Including Philip La Follette during the formation of the National Progressives of America. The building was listed on the National Register of Historic Places in 1985 and on the State Register of Historic Places in 1989 - significant for its intact, stylish architecture.
