= Agriculture Hall (Madison, Wisconsin) =

- U.S. National Register of Historic Places
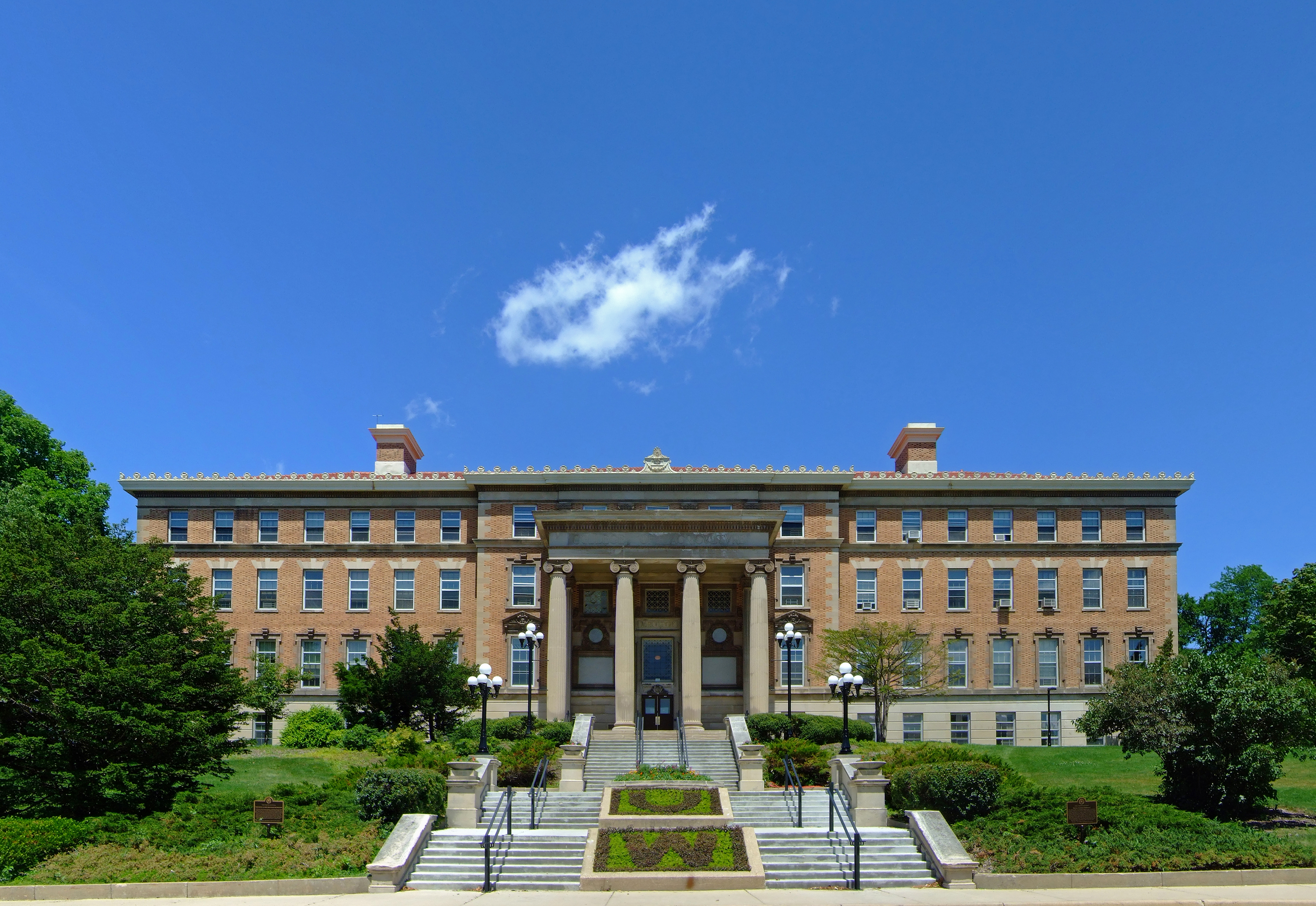
- Agriculture Hall
- Location: 1450 Linden Dr. Madison, Wisconsin
- Coordinates: 43.07564°N 89.41028°W
- Built: 1902-1903
- Architect: J. T. W. Jennings
- Architectural style: Beaux-Arts
- NRHP reference No.: 85000571
- Added to NRHP: March 14, 1985

Agriculture Hall is a Beaux Arts-style building on the campus of the University of Wisconsin–Madison built in 1903. In 1985 it was added to the National Register of Historic Places for its architecture and because it housed the first Department of Agricultural Economics in the U.S. and the first department of genetics.

The UW started its College of Agriculture in 1889. Early buildings were the 1892 Hiram Smith Hall, the 1894 King Hall, the 1897 Dairy Barn, and others. Between 1886 and 1901 the enrollment in the agricultural short course had multiplied ten-fold to 196, and the existing ag buildings were out of space. Dean William Henry pitched the need for another building and in 1901 the state legislature appropriated $150,000. J. T. W. Jennings, the UW's Supervising Architect at the time, designed the building and T.C. McCarthy supervised construction, which began in 1901.

The building is three stories tall, with a symmetric facade 200 feet wide, in Beaux Arts style, with a raised basement of limestone and the upper floors clad in red brick. The central entrance is shaded by a projecting 2-story portico with an entablature supported by four fluted Ionic columns, and the door is flanked on each side by a marble medallion in a fruit-and-vegetable wreath. Quoins decorate the ends of the front and a limestone cornice trims the top of the wall, which is sheltered by a red tile hip roof with two brick chimneys. The main block is 64 feet deep. Behind the main block is a 2-story octagonal wing which held a library in the basement and a 700-seat auditorium in the upper two stories, again with a red tile roof topped with a wooden cupola.

Inside the main entrance, one stair leads down to the basement and a marble staircase curves up to the piano nobile, where a central corridor runs the length of the building, with rooms opening on either side. A wooden dogleg staircase leads to the upper floors. Walls and ceilings are plastered and doors and windows are framed in dark wood.

Once the building was completed in 1903, it became the main building of the College of Agriculture, and some notable events took place within its walls. In 1909 the Department of Agricultural Economics was created there - the first such department in the U.S., founded by Dr. Henry Charles Taylor who is considered the father of agricultural economics. In 1910 the Department of Experimental Breeding was created in the building, headed by Leon Jacob Cole. Cole aimed to develop scientific rules that could be applied to practical breeding problems, keeping careful records while cross-breeding cattle, hybridizing corn, and improving barley, oats, soybeans and sweet clover. In 1918 this department of Experimental Breeding was renamed Department of Genetics - the first in the U.S.

In 1985 the building was placed on the NRHP for its fine architecture and some of the significant developments in the building. In 2001, the building was also honored by the UW Foundation with a commemorative marker.
