= J. T. W. Jennings =

American architect

John Thompson Williams Jennings (May 5, 1856 – July 9, 1944) was an American architect from Brooklyn. He was the Milwaukee Railroad's architect from 1885–93 and was part-time supervising architect for the University of Wisconsin from 1899 to 1906. He contributed to many prominent campus buildings.

== List of buildings designed or overseen ==
- Milwaukee Road depot (1889), Darlington, Wisconsin
- Milwaukee Road Railway depot (1890), Whitewater, Wisconsin

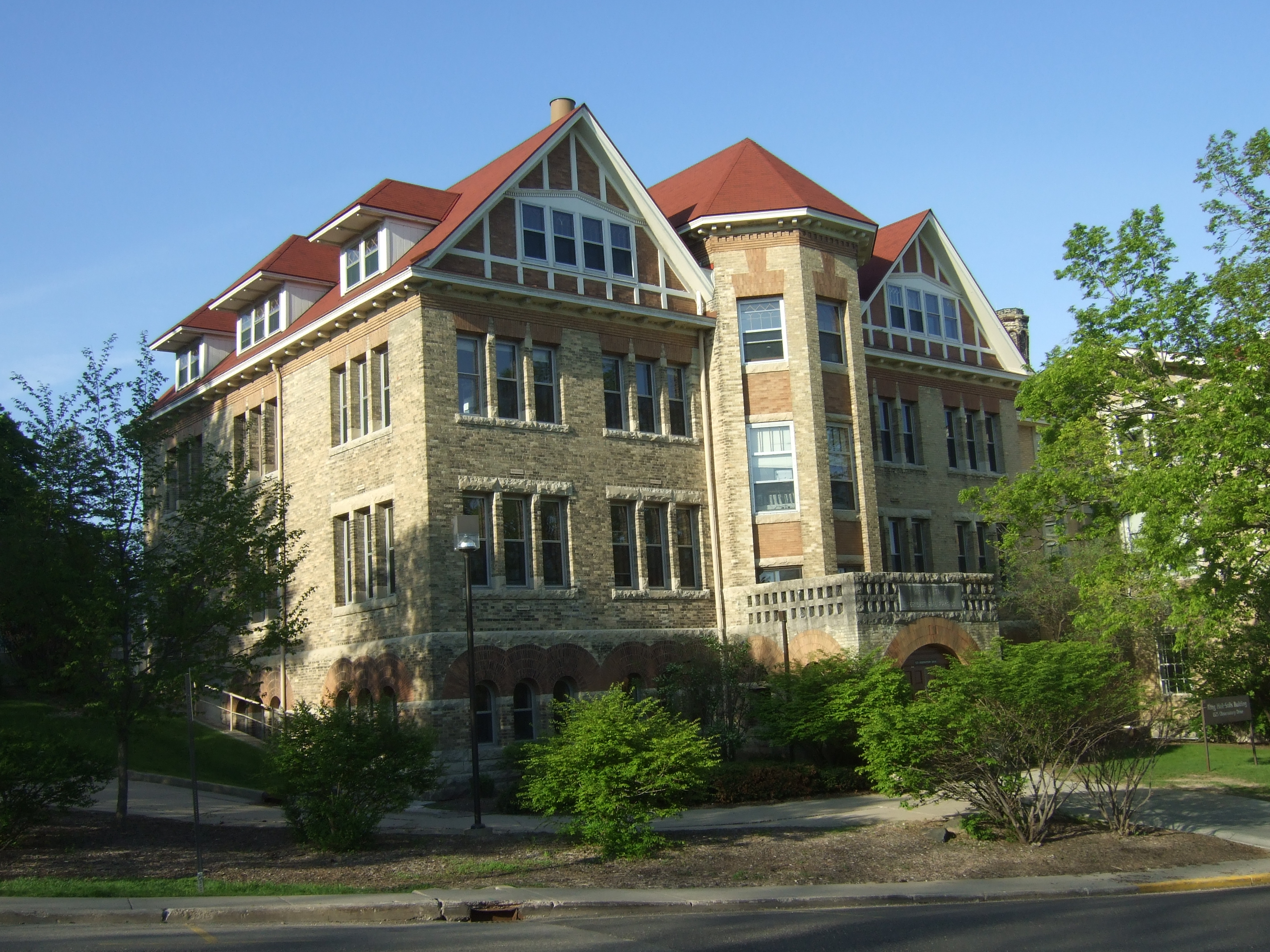
King Hall, Richardsonian Romanesque style, 1897

- University of Wisconsin–Madison King Hall, 1525 Observatory Drive, built in two stages as an expandable design (1894 and 1896)

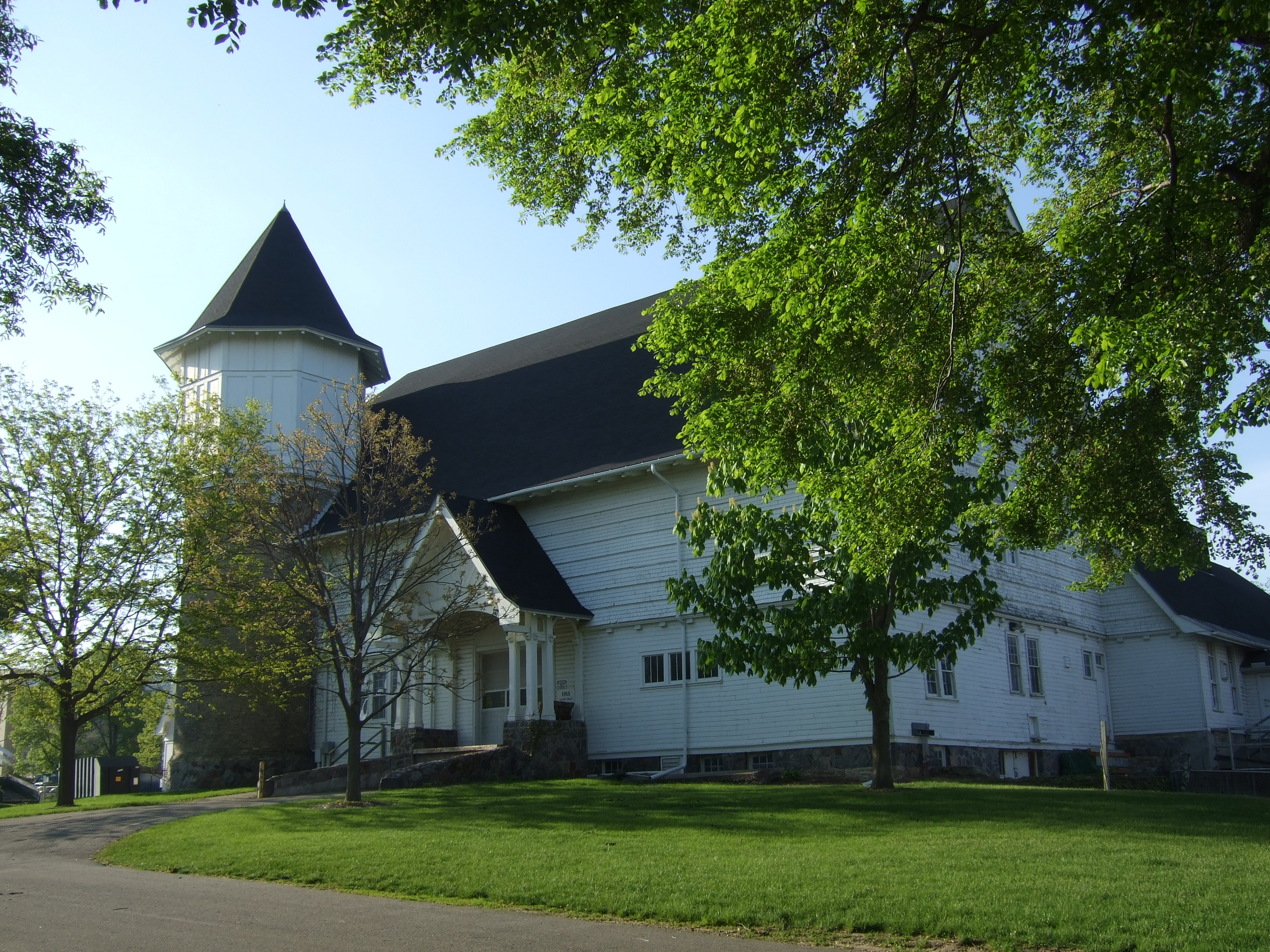
UW Dairy Barn, 1897

- University of Wisconsin–Madison Dairy Barn (1897), 1915 Linden Dr. Madison, Wisconsin
- University of Wisconsin–Madison Agricultural Bulletin Building (1899)

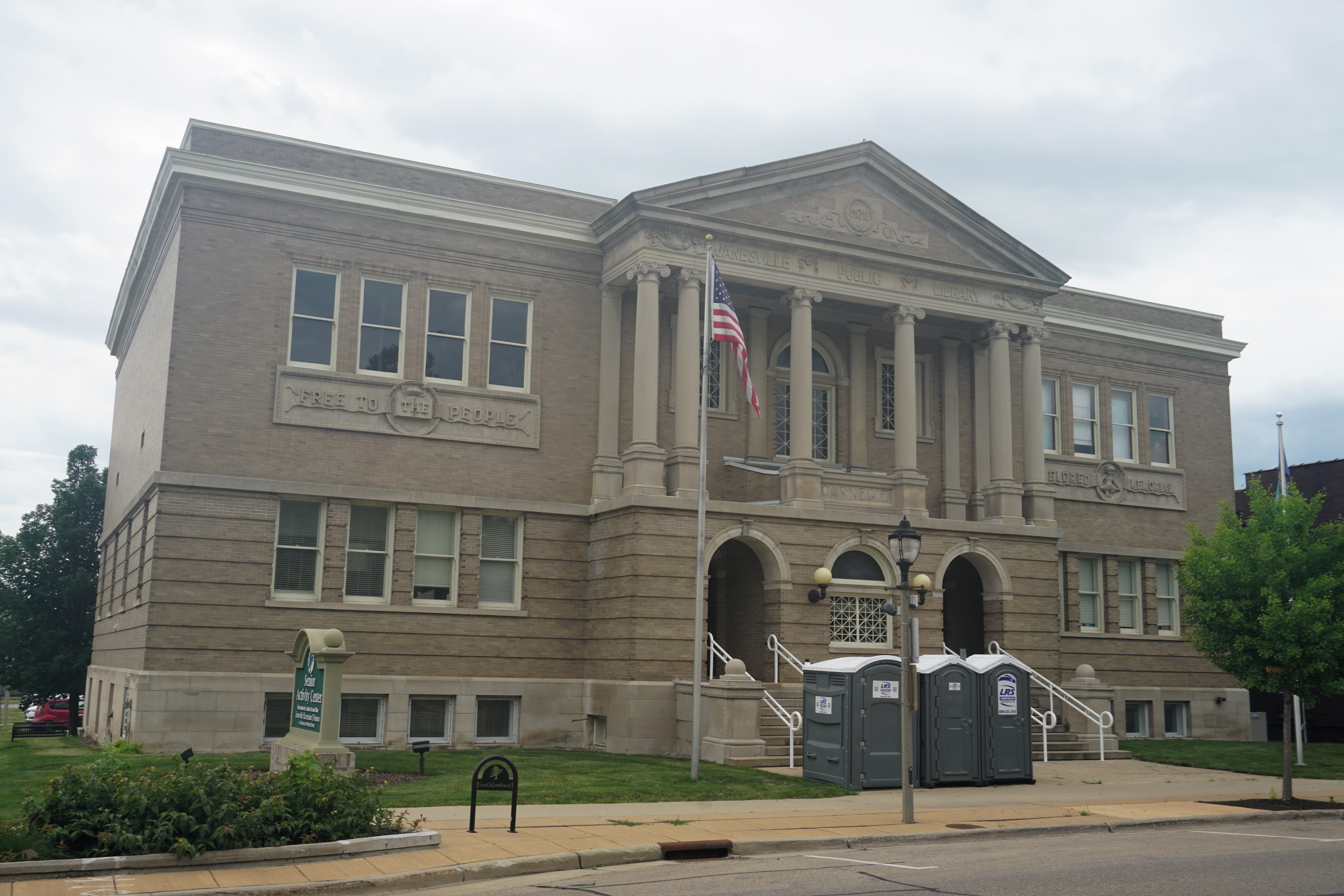
Janesville Public Library, Neoclassical, 1902

- Janesville Public Library (1902), S. Main Street, Janesville, Wisconsin

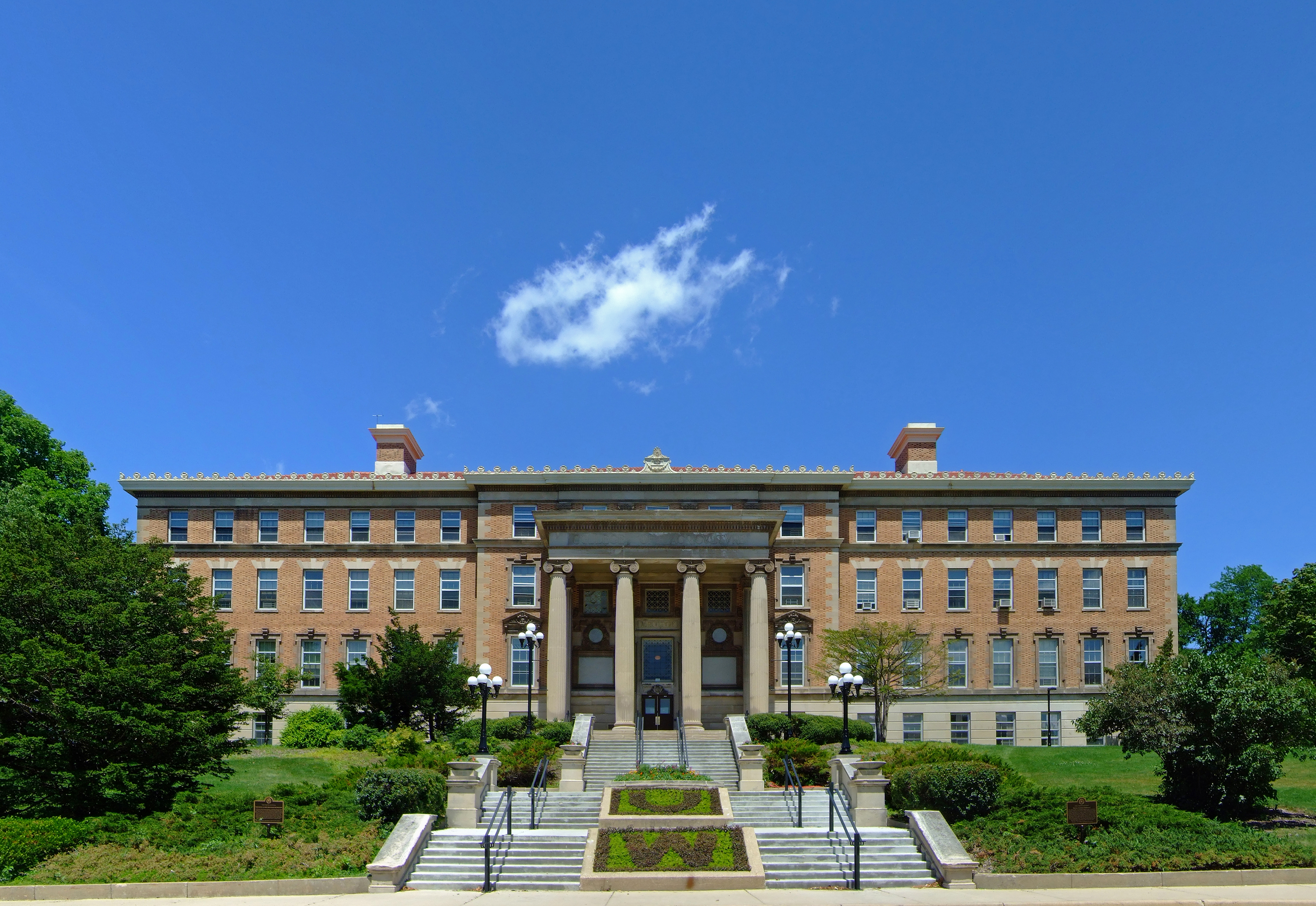
UW Agriculture Hall, Beaux-Arts style, 1902-1903

- University of Wisconsin–Madison Agriculture Hall (1903)

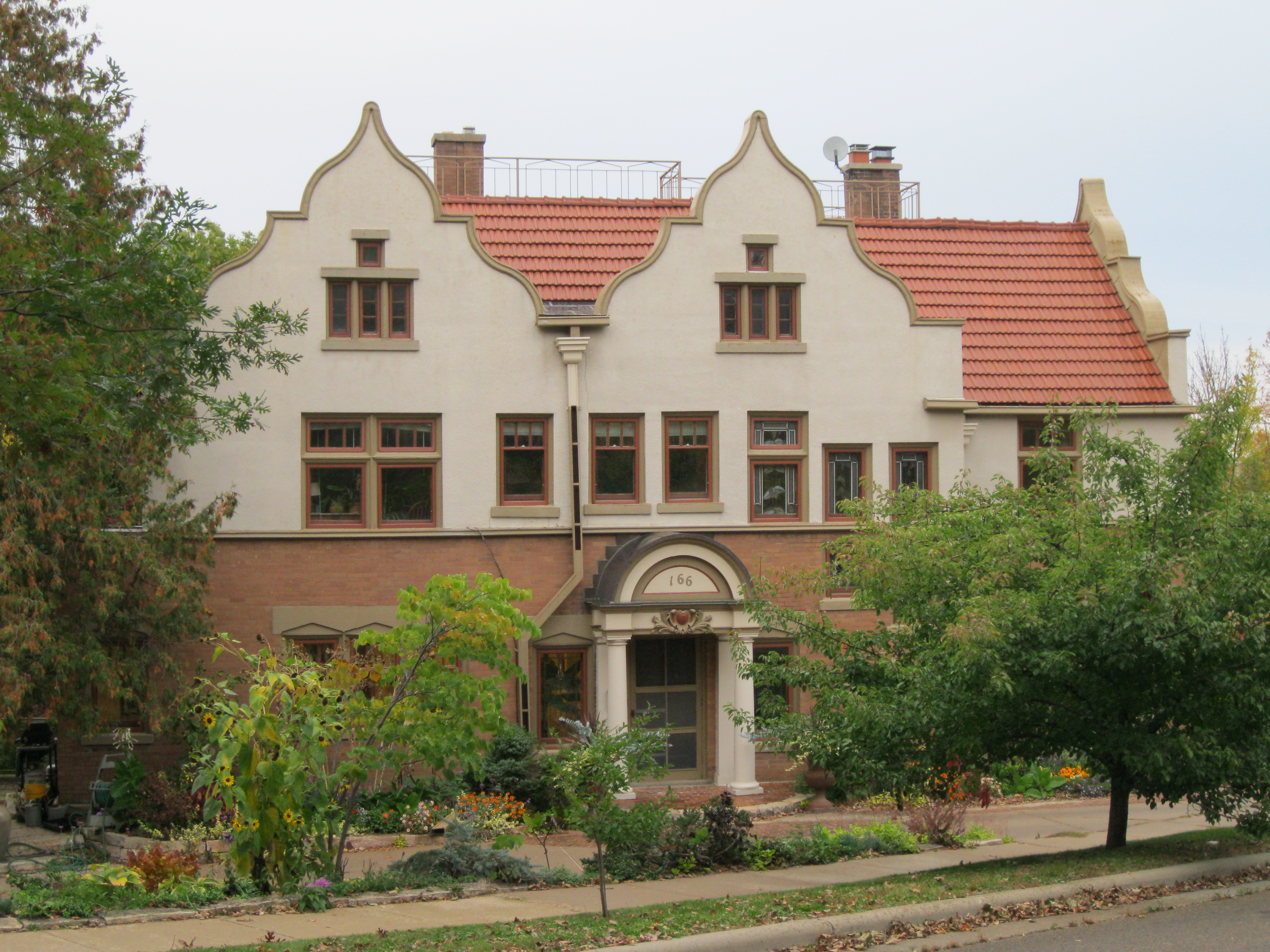
Turneaure house, Dutch Colonial Revival, 1905

- Frederick E. Turneaure house, 166 N Prospect Ave, Madison, (1905) Dutch Colonial Revival style, contributes to University Heights Historic District (Madison, Wisconsin)
- University of Wisconsin–Madison Engineering Building (Old Education)
- Dunn County Training and Agricultural School (with Claude and Starck) Menomonie, Wisconsin

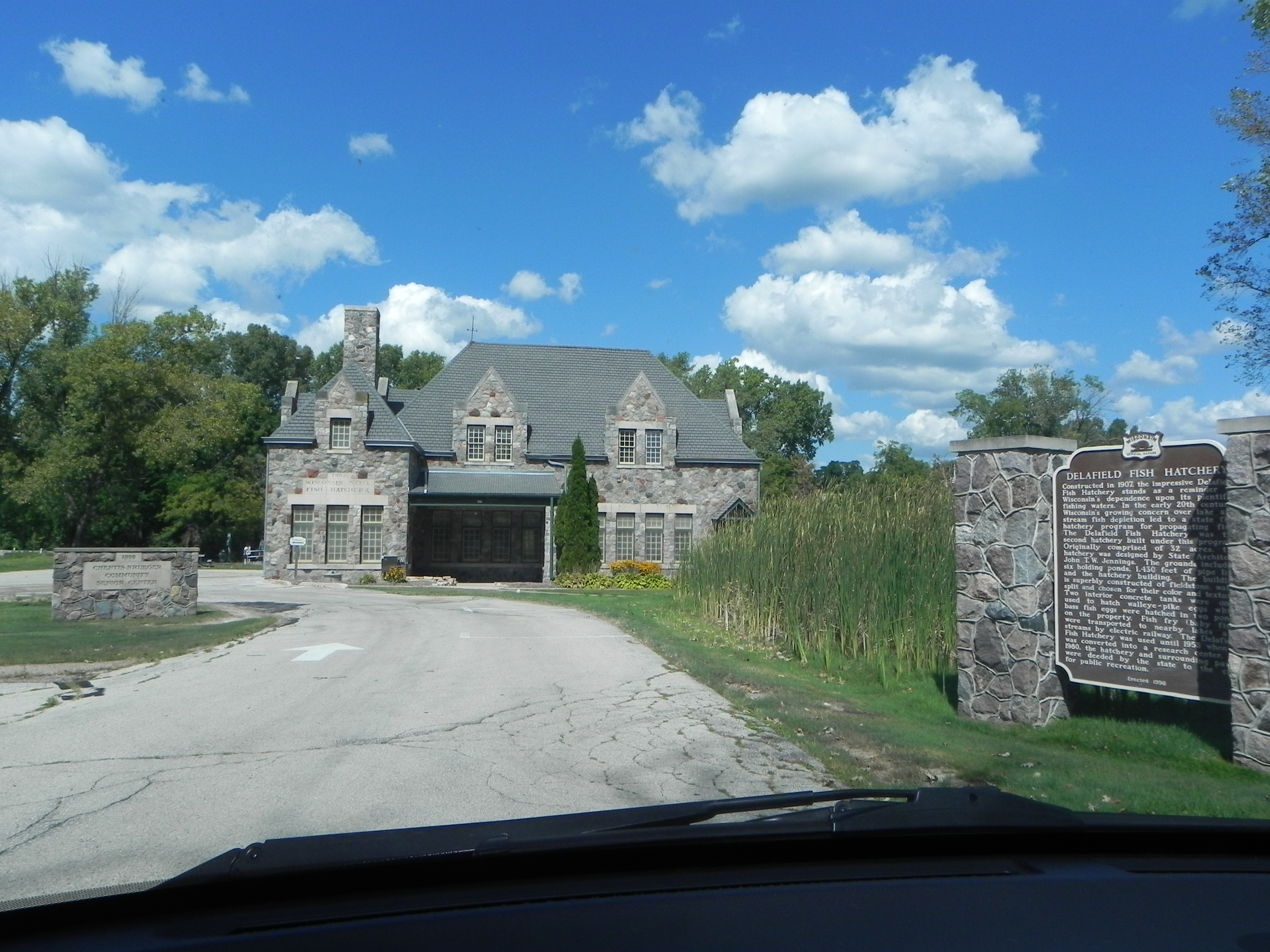
Delafield Fish Hatchery, Tudor Revival, 1907

- Delafield Fish Hatchery, 421 Main St., Delafield, Wisconsin, (1907)
