= Old U.S. Forest Products Laboratory =

- U.S. National Register of Historic Places
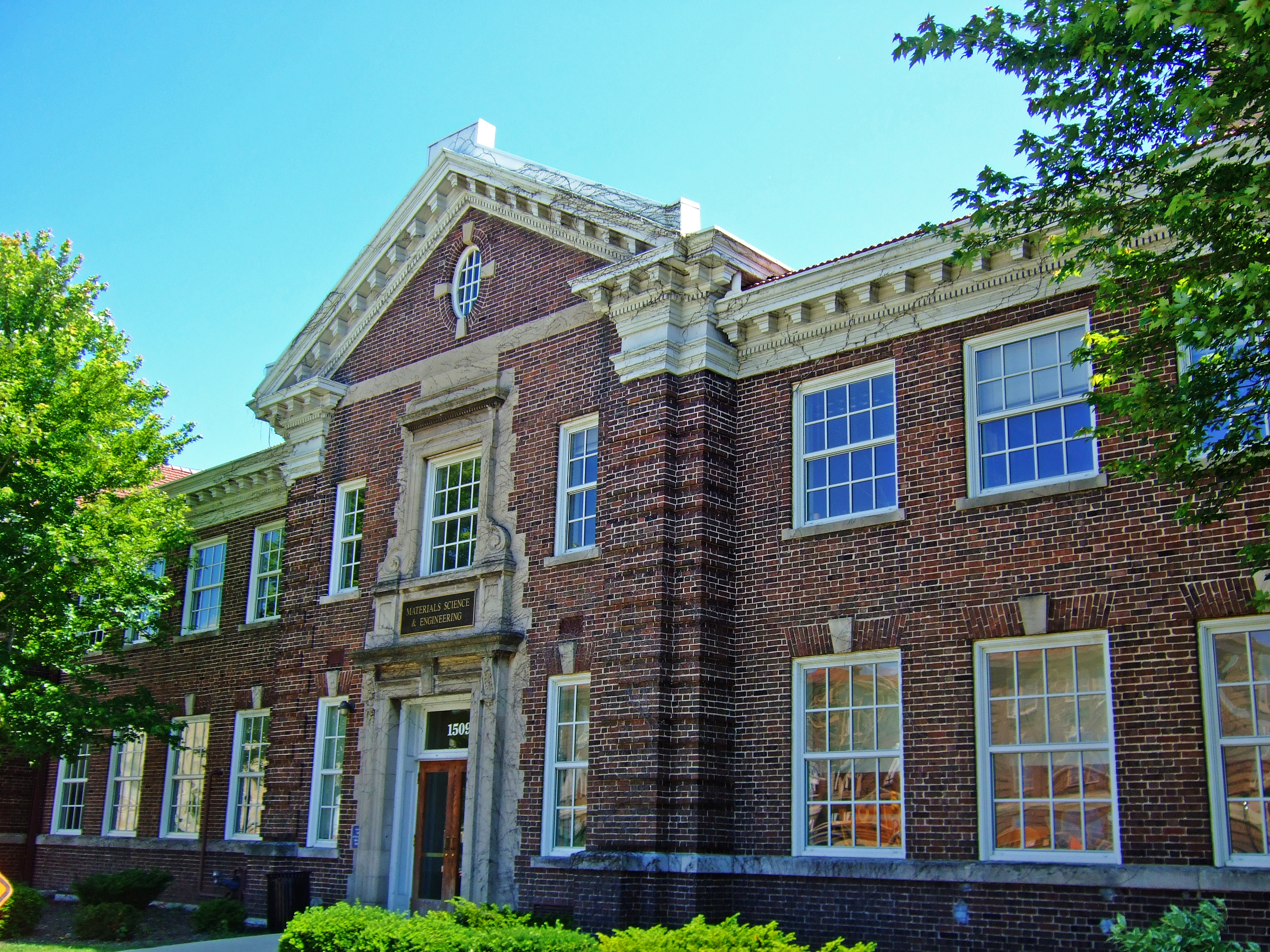
- Old U.S. Forest Products Laboratory
- Location: 1509 University Ave., University of Wisconsin campus, Madison, Wisconsin
- Coordinates: 43°04′23″N 89°24′40″W
- Area: less than one acre
- Built: 1910
- Architect: Albert F. Gallistel/Arthur Peabody
- Architectural style: Georgian Revival
- NRHP reference No.: 85002332
- Added to NRHP: September 12, 1985

The Old U.S. Forest Products Laboratory, built in 1910 in Madison, Wisconsin, housed a new national lab, and the first institution in the world created specifically to research wood and wood products. Research in this building produced breakthroughs in wood preservation, laminates, and paper production. The building itself is a good example of Georgian Revival-style architecture. In 1985 the building was added to the National Register of Historic Places.

== History ==
By the late 1800s, it was becoming clear to some that North America's forests were not inexhaustible, so it was important to find ways to use them more efficiently. In 1876 Congress authorized one person to study the matter. Five years later it created a Division of Forestry within the Department of Agriculture. That division eventually developed into the United States Forest Service.

By 1908 the Forest Service had various labs scattered around the country: Purdue and Yale, Washington, California, Oregon, Colorado, and Boston. That year the Service decided to consolidate those labs in one facility. The location was determined partly by a bidding competition in which Wisconsin beat universities like Yale and the University of Michigan. The UW was chosen for its rail connections, for its access to America's timber-producing regions, and for its reputation for scientific research.

The UW had agreed to provide a building for the lab. Albert F. Gallistel, working in the office of UW Supervising Architect Arthur Peabody, designed the building with technical input from McGarvey Cline, the Forest Service's Chief of the Office of Wood Utilization. They designed a building with a C-shaped footprint 182 by 90 feet on a poured concrete foundation. It displays the symmetry, red brick, and classical detail of Georgian Revival style, including these elements: quoins on the corners, heads on the quoins which suggest pilasters, and a modillioned cornice with cornice returns. The main entrance is framed in limestone. Above it is an elliptical window. The roof is covered in red tile. The multi-pane windows are typical of Georgian Revival style, and the first story ones are decorated with keystones.

In 1910 the various labs moved into the new unified Forest Products Laboratory at Madison. Timber physics, timber testing, and the pulp, paper and wood preservation labs moved into the first floor. Wood chemistry and wood distillation labs were on the second floor. The whole initially employed forty-five researchers.

For a few years the lab at Madison remained the world's only institution dedicated to research on wood and its uses. In those first years under McGarvey Cline and Howard Weiss, the lab's focus was on wood preservation. In 1911 Harry Tiemann patented a humidity-regulated dry kiln that improved the quality of dried wood and reduced waste. During WWI, with Carlile Winslow as director, research on glues and plywood at the lab helped the aircraft industry. During the 1920s the lab developed the "semi-chemical" process of reducing hardwoods to pulp for making paper, expanding the paper-making industry.

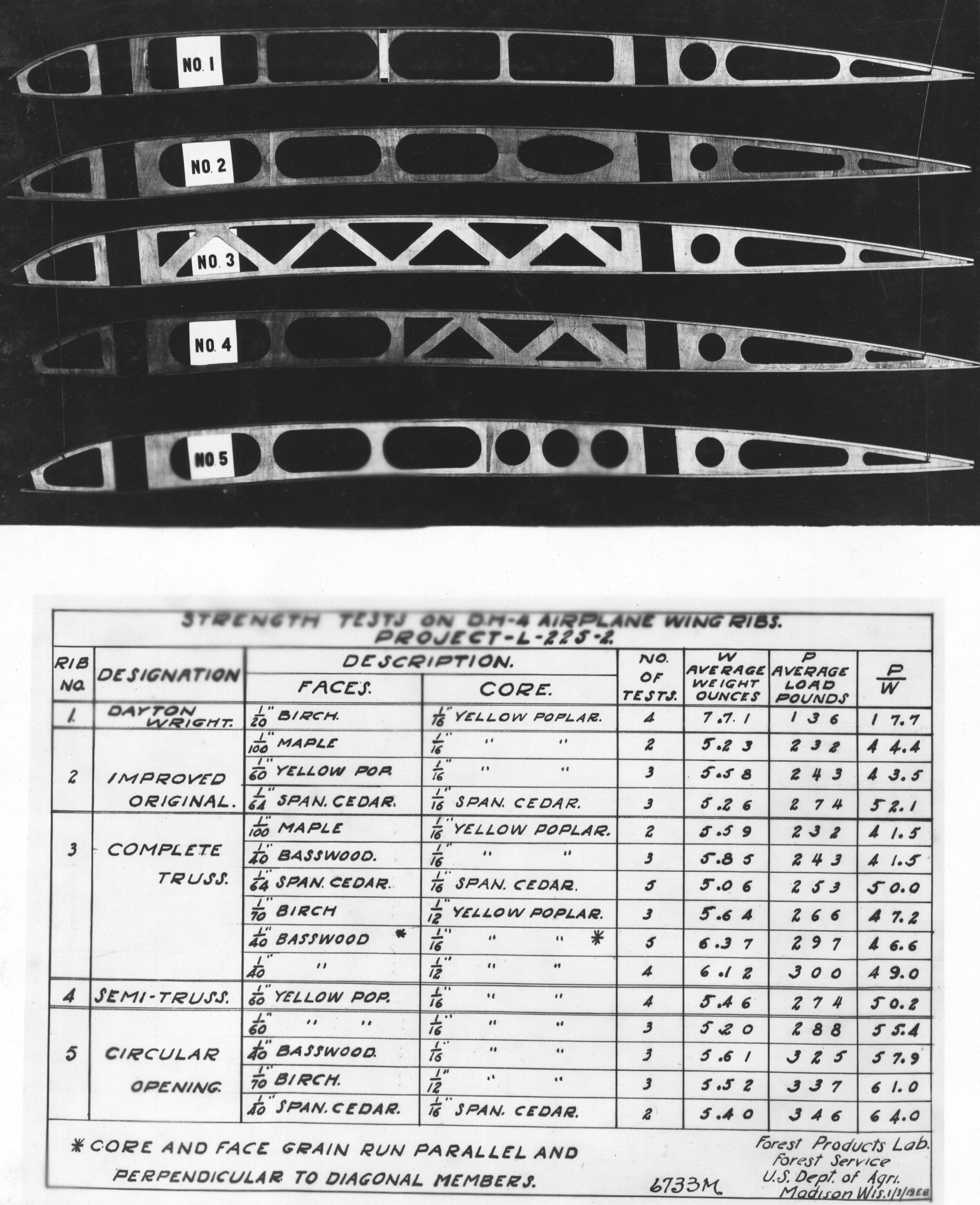
Results of strength tests for different designs of a DeHaviland wing rib during World War I.

This building housed the Forest Products lab until 1932, at which time operations were moved to a larger complex on Gifford Pinchot Drive. At that point the UW's Mining and Metallurgy moved into the building. That department has since been renamed Materials Science. The building was added on to in 1975 and 1996. In 1985 it was listed on the National Register of Historic Places and on the State Register of Historic Places in 1989.
