= Hiram Smith Hall and Annex =

- U.S. National Register of Historic Places
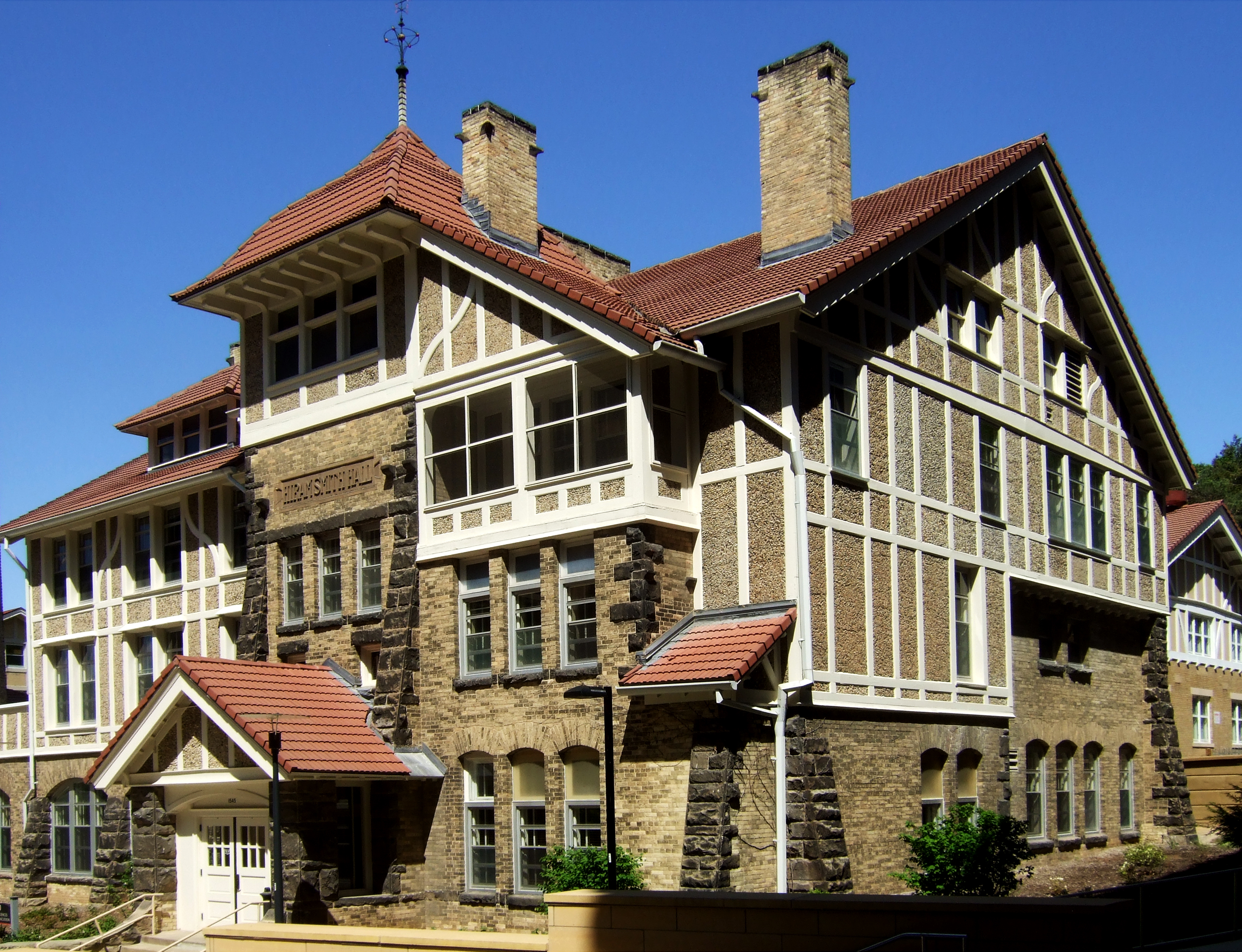
- Hiram Smith Hall and Annex
- Location: 1545 Observatory Dr., Univ. of WI, Madison, Wisconsin
- Coordinates: 43°04′33″N 89°24′42″W
- Area: less than one acre
- Architect: Ferry & Clas/Arthur Peabody
- Architectural style: Queen Anne
- NRHP reference No.: 85000573
- Added to NRHP: March 14, 1985

The Hiram Smith Hall and Annex is part of the University of Wisconsin-Madison College of Agricultural and Life Sciences. The hall was built in 1891 to house the first permanent dairy school in the western hemisphere, which had been established the year before. The annex was added in 1909 as the dairy school grew. In 1985 the pair were listed on the National Register of Historic Places.

== History ==
The University of Wisconsin (UW) was created in 1848, with its early buildings on the east side of Bascom Hill, facing the state capitol. Early on, the UW taught a classical curriculum, focusing on geography, English grammar, Latin and Greek. As years passed, that curriculum shifted to more practical subjects like the mechanical arts and agriculture.

At first the whole UW was housed in North Hall. South Hall was the next added. As more buildings were added, departments moved to them and in 1884 South Hall became Agriculture Hall. In 1886 the UW initiated its Short Course in Agriculture - twelve weeks of practical instruction for farmers, held in the winter when they weren't busy with crops. The UW's College of Agriculture was founded in 1889. The UW Dairy School was started the following year - a twelve-week practical course in butter and cheesemaking - the first permanent dairy school in the U.S. To house that Dairy School, Dean Henry and Stephen Babcock cobbled together a modest wooden building that looked like a house. Two students enrolled in the Dairy School in 1890 - the first year.

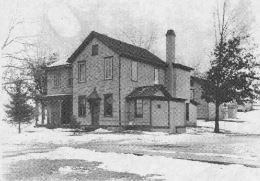
First Dairy Building, built 1890

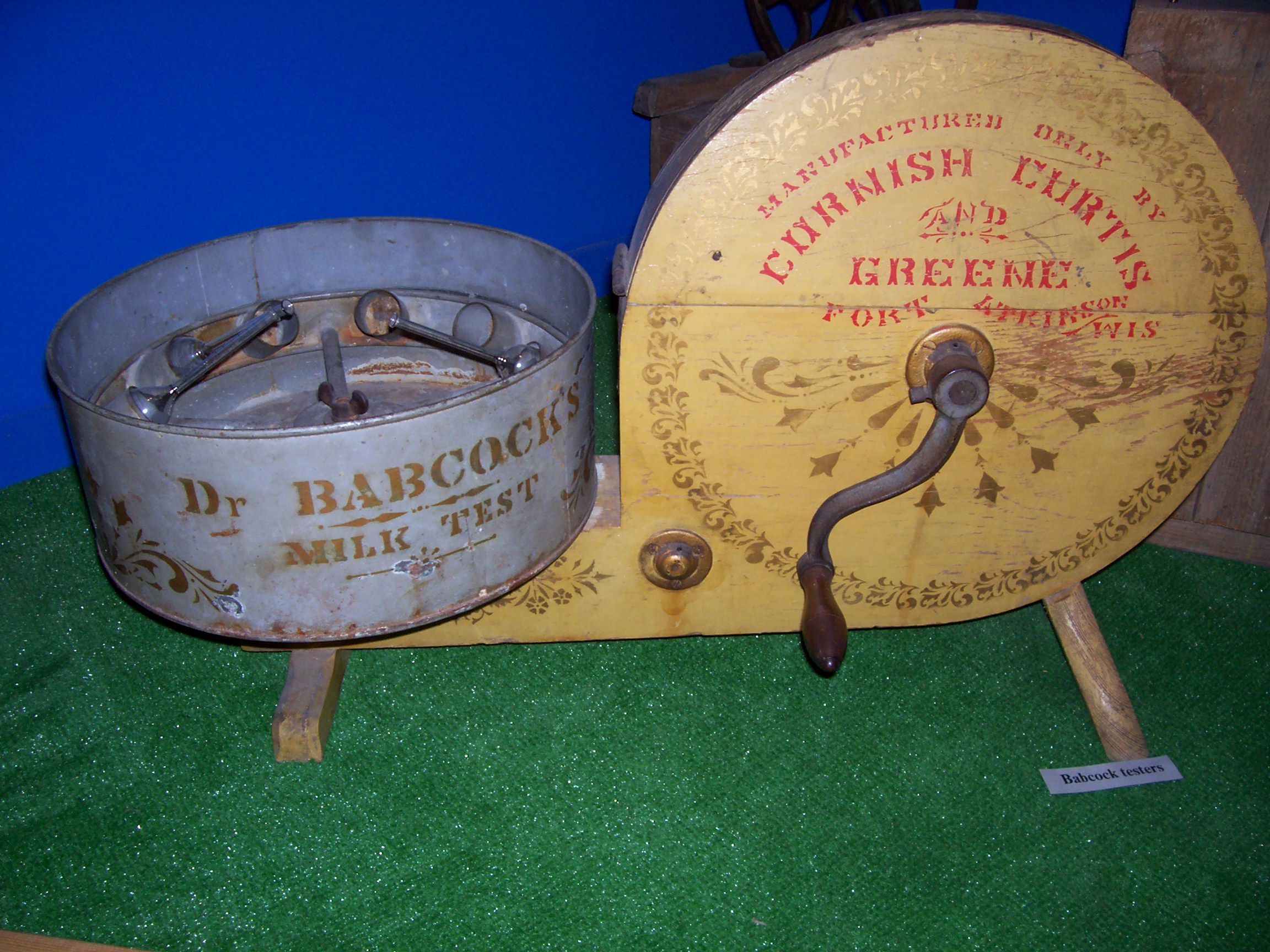
Early Babcock tester

But also in 1890 Stephen Babcock developed his test to determine the fat content in a sample of milk. This quick and simple test let creameries pay individual farmers more for better-quality milk, encouraging improvement of herds and cattle care, and helped the dairy industry grow.

The Babcock tester and the UW's short courses were economically valuable to the state and brought publicity, producing support for the UW's dairy endeavors. On this wave of good will, Dean Henry and farmer, legislator and UW Regent Hiram Smith persuaded the state legislature to approve funds to build a dairy instruction building on the UW campus. (One of Dean Henry's tactics was to have legislators observe students making butter and cheese in that first dairy building, to see how crowded it was.) It was good that the new building was approved, because enrollment in the dairy school leaped from two in 1890 to 75 in January 1891.

The new building was designed by George Ferry of Milwaukee. The lowest bid for construction was from T.C. McCarthy, who had previously supervised building of the 1885 Science Hall and the 1885 UW-Chemistry building, among other projects. Construction of Hiram Smith Hall began in the fall of 1891, with the contract specifying that the first floor be ready for students by January 1, 1892. McCarthy's firm achieved that ambitious goal, with 100 dairy students starting classes there in January. Construction of the upper floors continued for months into mid-1892.

Ferry designed the building's exterior in the Queen Anne style that was popular at the time. Typical of the style are the complex roof, the asymmetric facade and tower, the prominent chimneys, and the various surface textures. The half-timbering adds a Tudor Revival flavor. The picturesque building stands 3.5 stories tall, with its roof clad in red tile.

The building was full from the start. In 1901 a two-story north section was added to hold cheese and butter rooms. In 1909 another wing was added on the north for bottling equipment. Also in 1909 an annex building was added behind the main Smith Hall, designed by Arthur Peabody two stories tall. The annex and additions harmonized with the original building's style. The dairy department stayed in the building until 1951, when it moved to the new Babcock Hall. Agricultural journalism and poultry science occupied Smith Hall after. The Annex was occupied by veterinary science, then the poultry department, then the soils department. As of 2024 King Hall houses the Department of Life Sciences Communications.

In 1985 Smith Hall and the Annex were listed on the National Register of Historic Places. Smith Hall is considered significant at a national level as housing the first permanent dairy school in the U.S., and for its association with scientists Stephen Babcock and Harry Luman Russell. It is considered significant at a local level as a rare Queen Anne design for an education building on the UW campus. It is also the only education building on campus designed by Ferry and Clas. Both buildings were added to the State Register of Historic Places in 1989.
