= Arthur Peabody =

American architect (1858–1942)

Arthur Peabody (November 16, 1858 – September 6, 1942) was the campus architect for the University of Wisconsin from 1905 to 1915 and the state architect of Wisconsin from 1915 to 1938.

Peabody was born in Eau Claire, Wisconsin. He graduated from the University of Illinois in 1882. He designed or directed a number of Madison landmarks, including the Wisconsin State Office Building and the University of Wisconsin Memorial Union. He died in Madison, Wisconsin, on September 6, 1942.

== Buildings designed or overseen ==
- University Club, UW-Madison 803 State Street (1905-1906)
- Hydraulics Laboratory, UW-Madison, now the Water Science and Engineering Laboratory, 660 N. Park Street (1906)
- additions to Bascom Hall, UW-Madison, 500 Lincoln Drive (1906-1907, and 1924)
- Old Agronomy Building, UW-Madison, now Agricultural Journalism, 440 Henry Mall (1907)
- Agricultural Engineering Building, UW-Madison, 460 Henry Mall (1907)
- Stock Pavilion, UW-Madison, 1675 Linden Drive (1908)
- Litter Shed addition to the Dairy Barn, UW-Madison, 1915 Linden Drive (1908)
- Central Heating Station, UW-Madison, now the Service Building Annex, 1225 University Avenue (1908)
- Old U.S. Forest Products Laboratory, UW-Madison, now the Materials Science & Engineering Building, 1509 University Avenue (1909)
- Lathrop Hall, UW-Madison, 1050 University Avenue (1909)
- Dairy Annex, UW-Madison, now Hiram Smith Hall and Annex, 1545 Observatory Drive (1909)
- Birge Hall, UW-Madison, 430 Lincoln Drive (1910)
- additions to the Armory, UW-Madison, 716 Langdon Street (1911)
- additions to Chamberlin Hall, UW-Madison, 1150 University Avenue (1912)
- Home Economics Building, UW-Madison, now the Human Ecology Building, 1300 Linden Drive (1912)
- King Hall, UW-Madison, 1525 Observatory Drive
- Agricultural Chemistry Building, UW-Madison, now the Biochemistry Building, 420 Henry Mall (general contractor of a Laird and Cret design) (1912)
- Barnard Hall, UW-Madison, 970 University Avenue (supervisor of Laird and Cret design) (1912)
- additions to Wisconsin Historical Society building, 816 State Street (1912)
- Adams County Courthouse, 402 Main Street, Friendship, Wisconsin (1914)
- Sterling Hall, UW-Madison, 475 N. Charter Street (1915)
- setting for statue of Abraham Lincoln atop Bascom Hill, UW–Madison (1916)
- Camp Randall Field House, UW-Madison, 1450 Monroe Street (1916-1930)
- Infirmary, UW-Madison, now the School of Social Work Building, 1350 University Avenue (with Ferry and Clas) (1918, addition 1930)
- Bradley Memorial Hospital, UW-Madison, now the Bradley Memorial Building, 1215 Linden Drive (1918-1920)
- additions to North Hall, UW-Madison, 1050 Bascom Mall (1919)
- Wisconsin General Hospital, now the UW-Madison Medical Sciences Center, 1300 University Avenue (1924)
- Memorial Union, UW-Madison, 800 Langdon Street (1925)
- Van Hise Dormitories, UW-Madison: Tripp Hall, Adams Hall, and the Van Hise Refectory, now Carson Gulley Hall; 1510, 1520, and 1515 Tripp Circle (1926)
- St. Andrew's Episcopal Church, 1833 Regent Street (1927)
- Mechanical Engineering Building, UW-Madison, 1513 University Avenue (1930-1931)
- Wisconsin State Office Building, 1-29 W. Wilson Street (1932)
- Urben House, Mendota Mental Health Institute (1932)
- Carillon Tower, UW-Madison, 1180 Observatory Drive (1934)

== Gallery ==
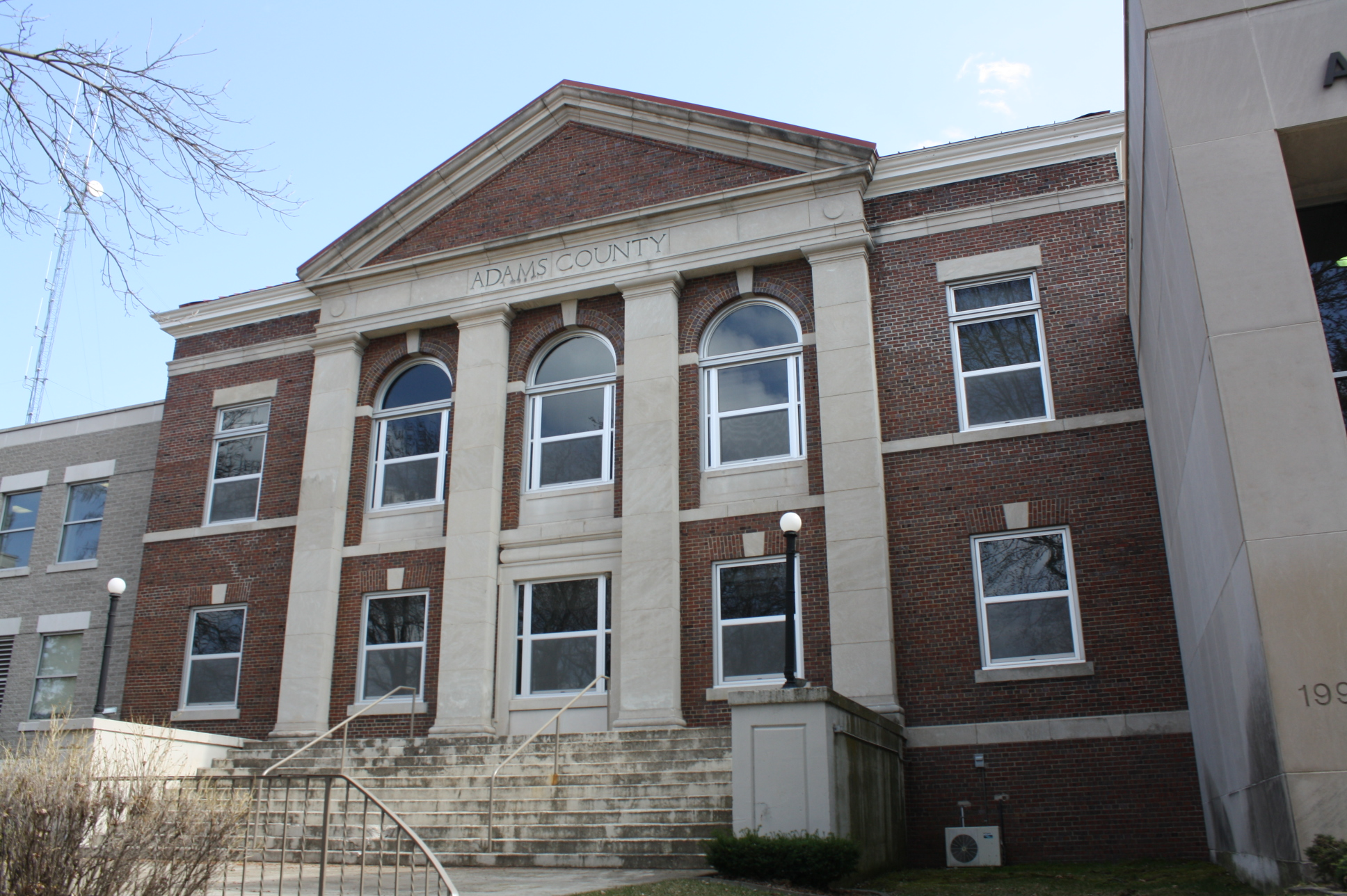
Adams County Courthouse

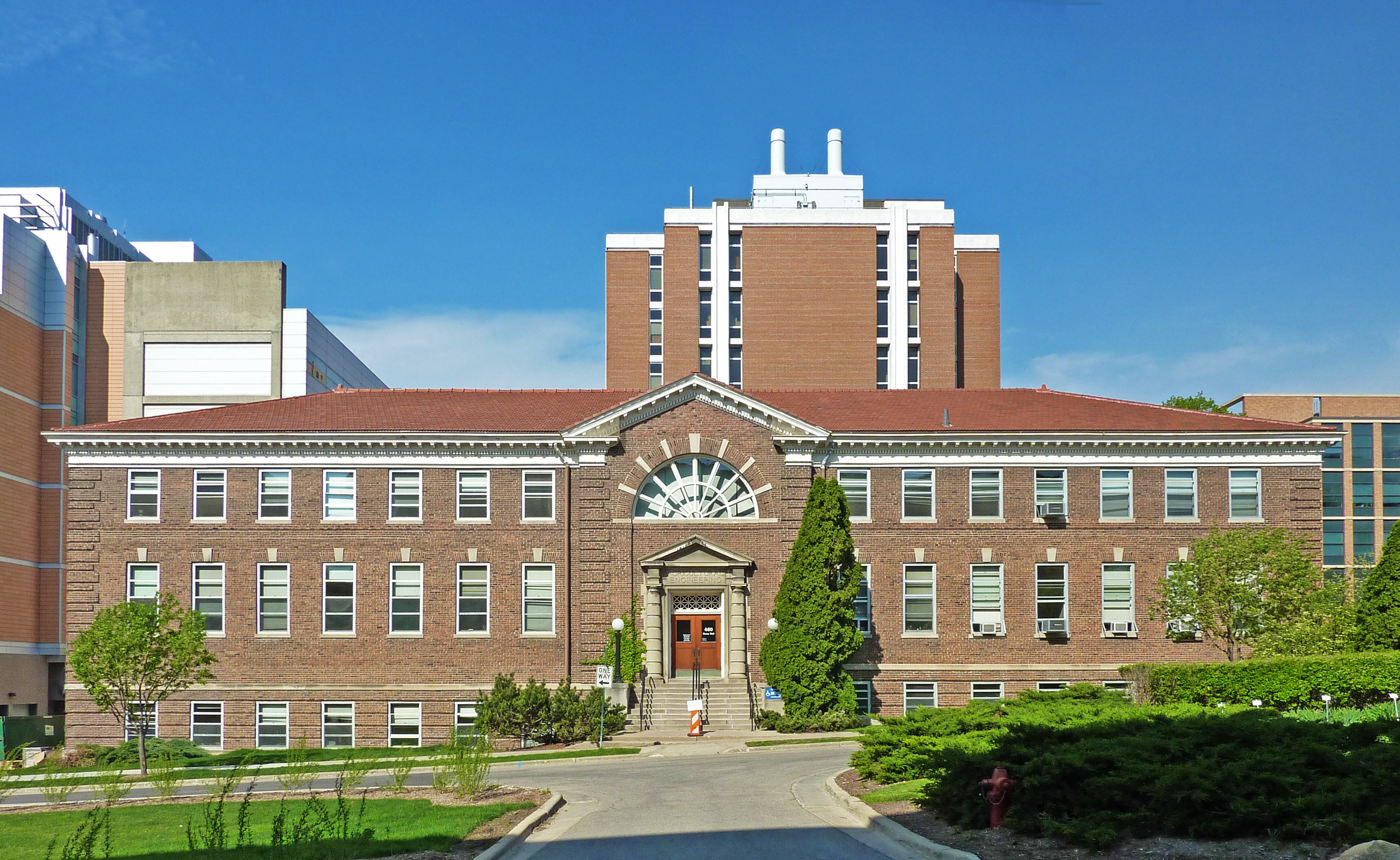
Agricultural Engineering

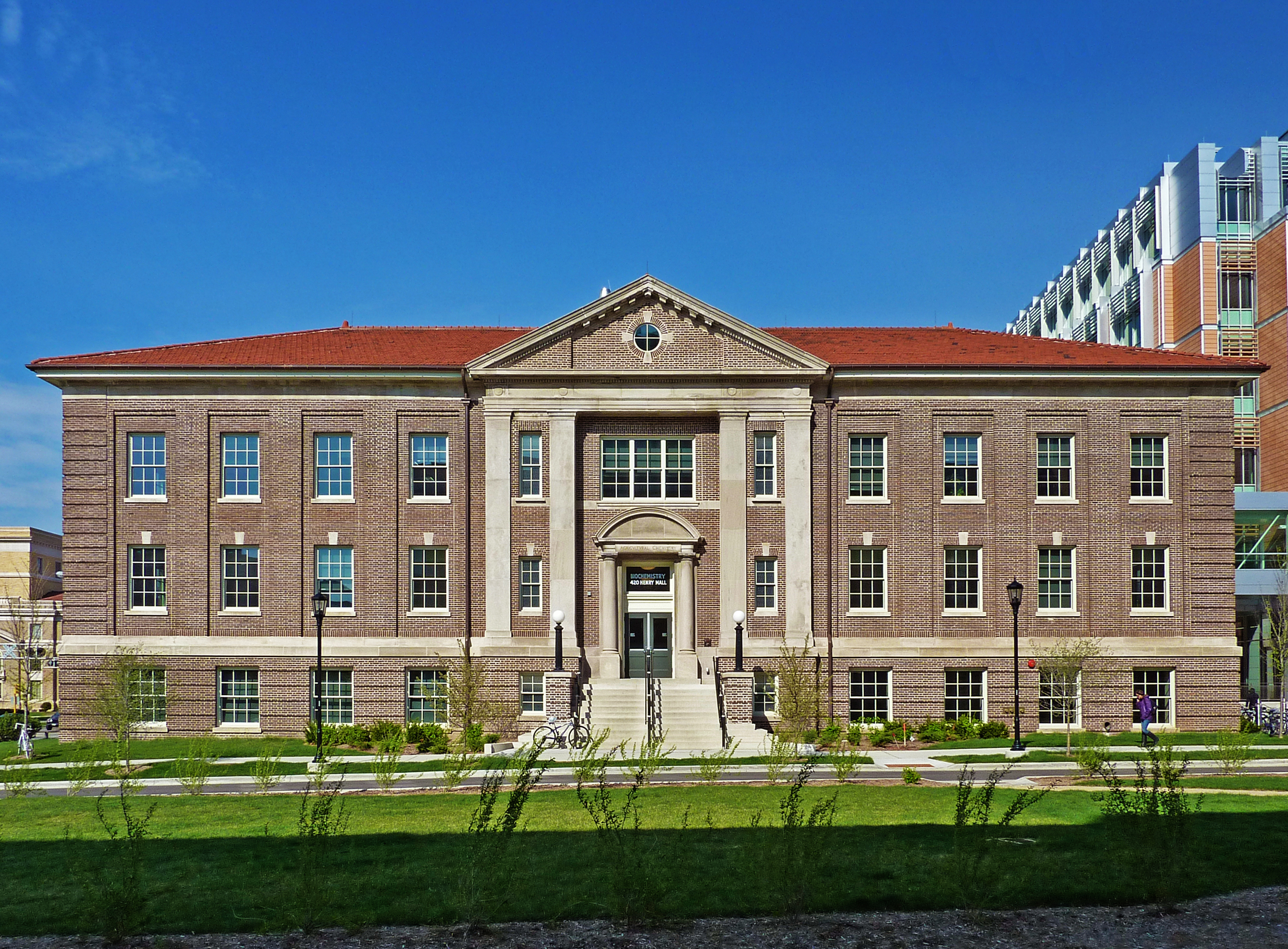
Biochemistry Building

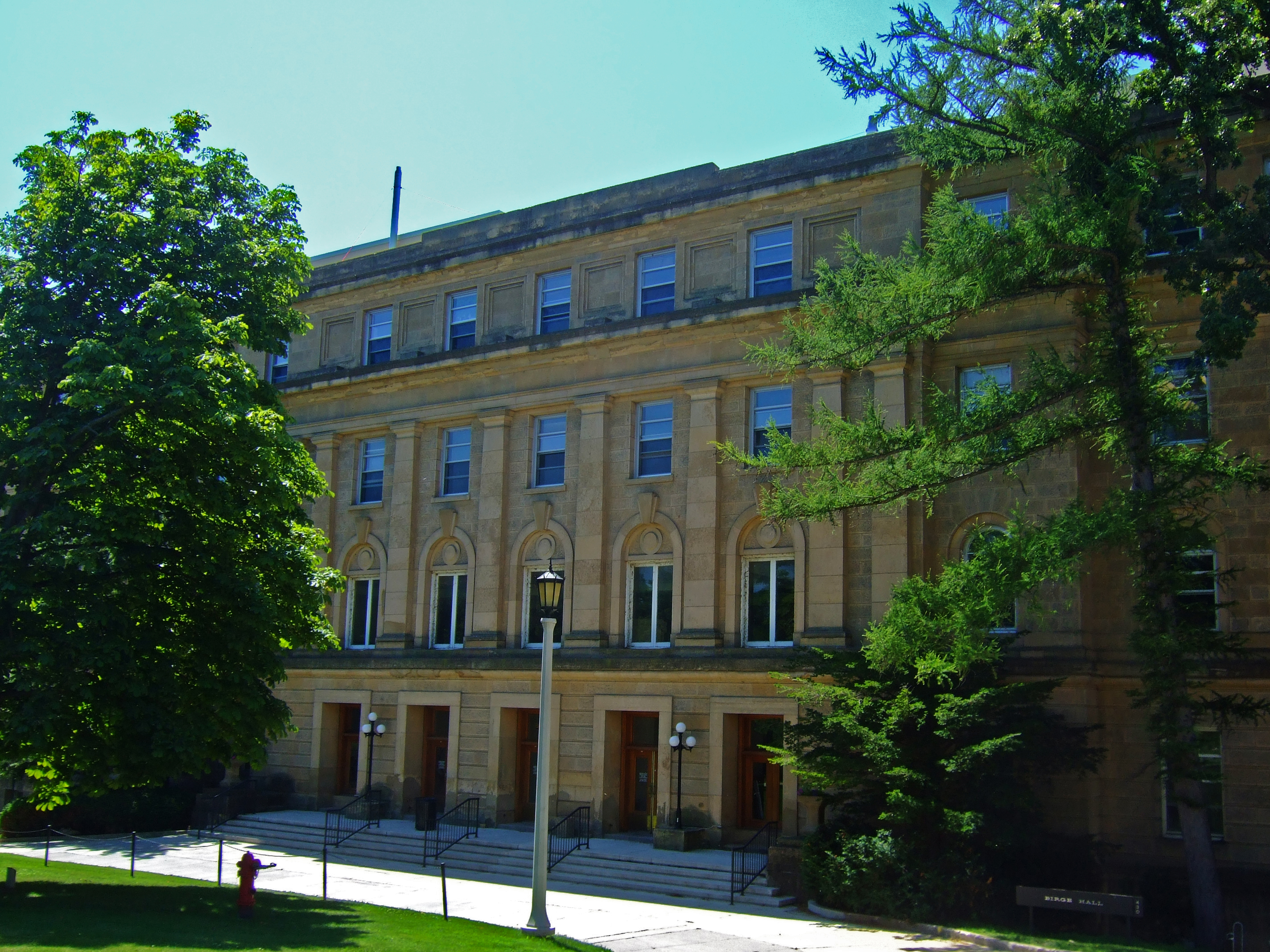
Birge Hall

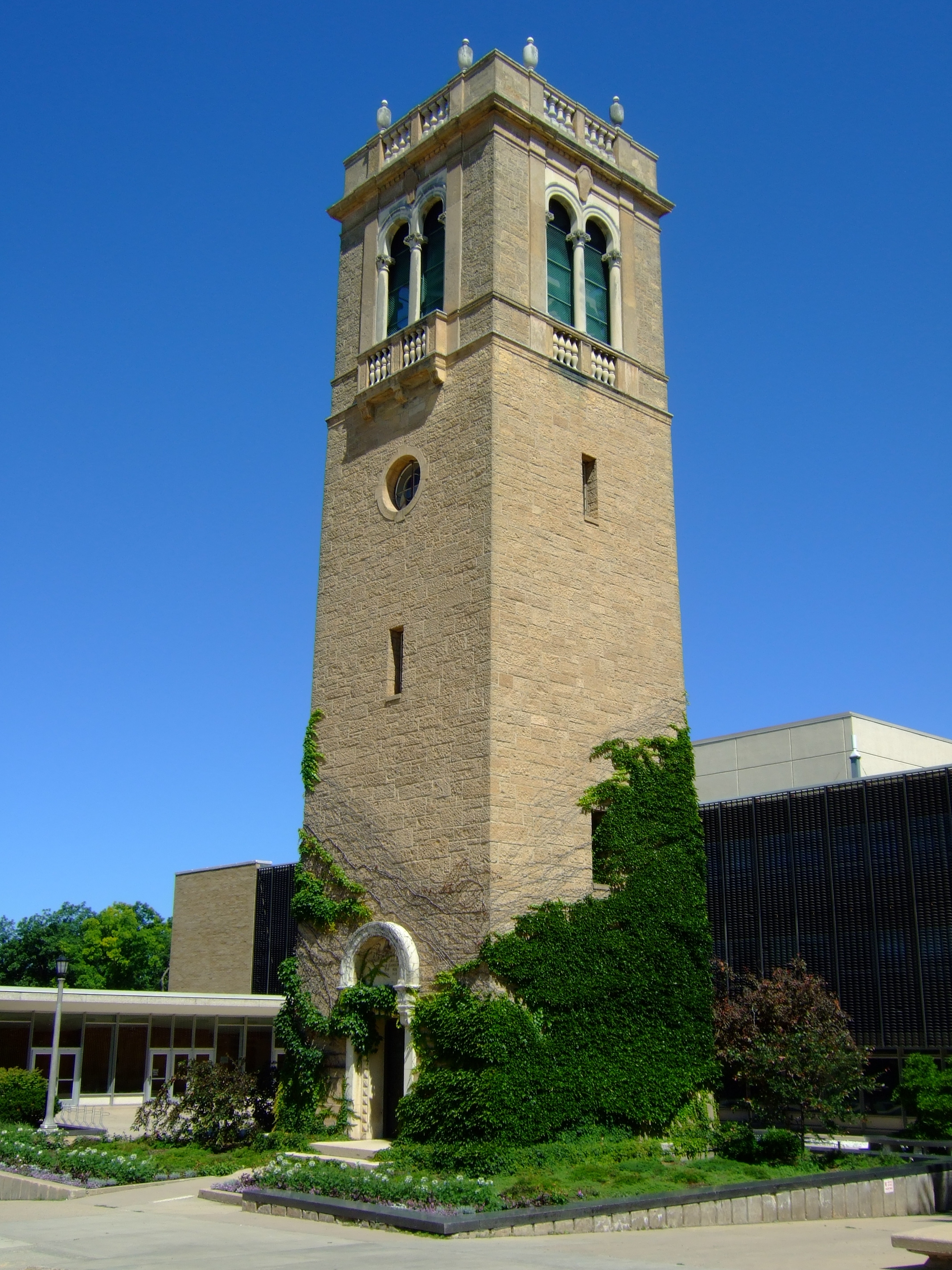
Carillon Tower

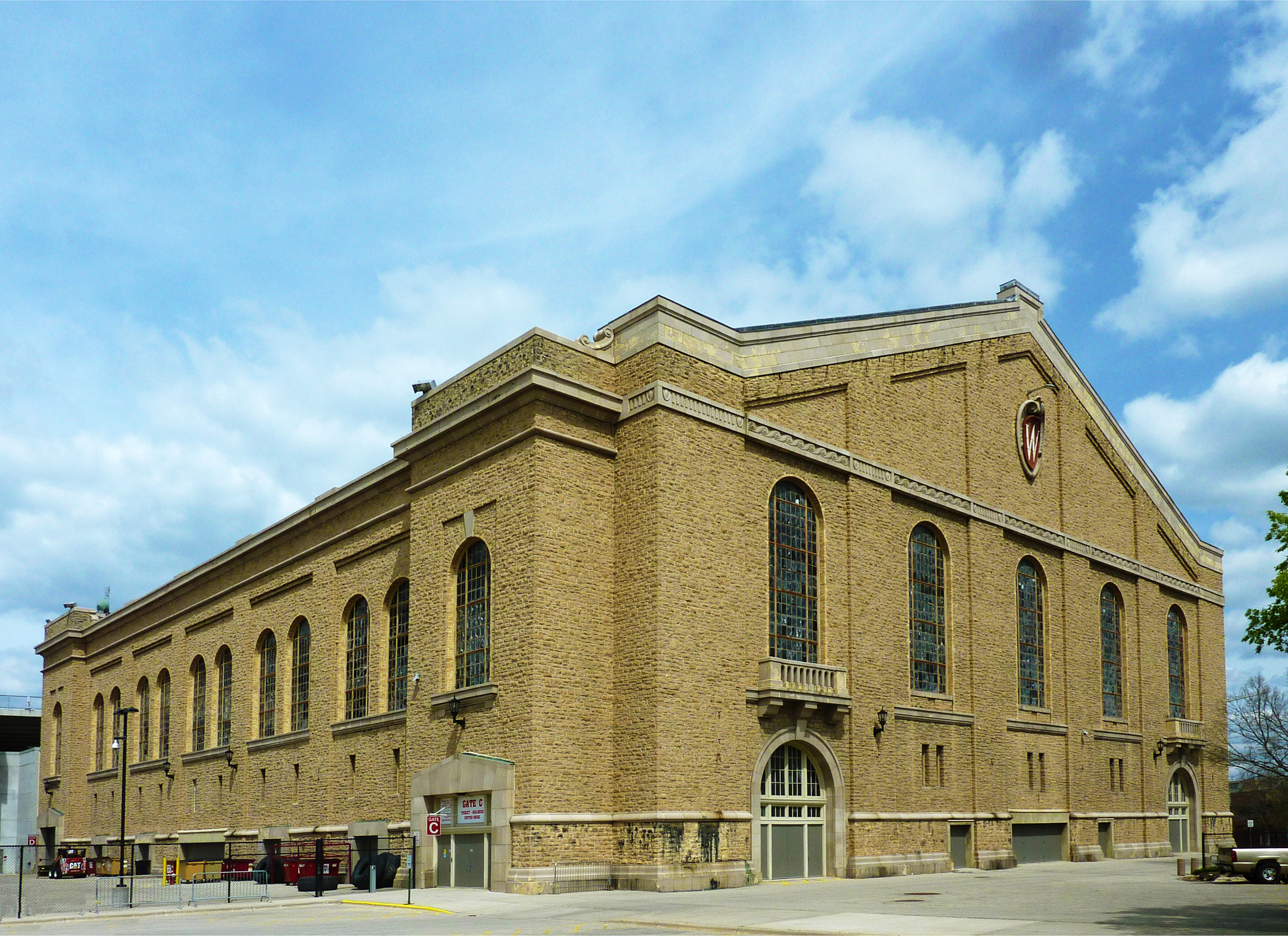
Field House

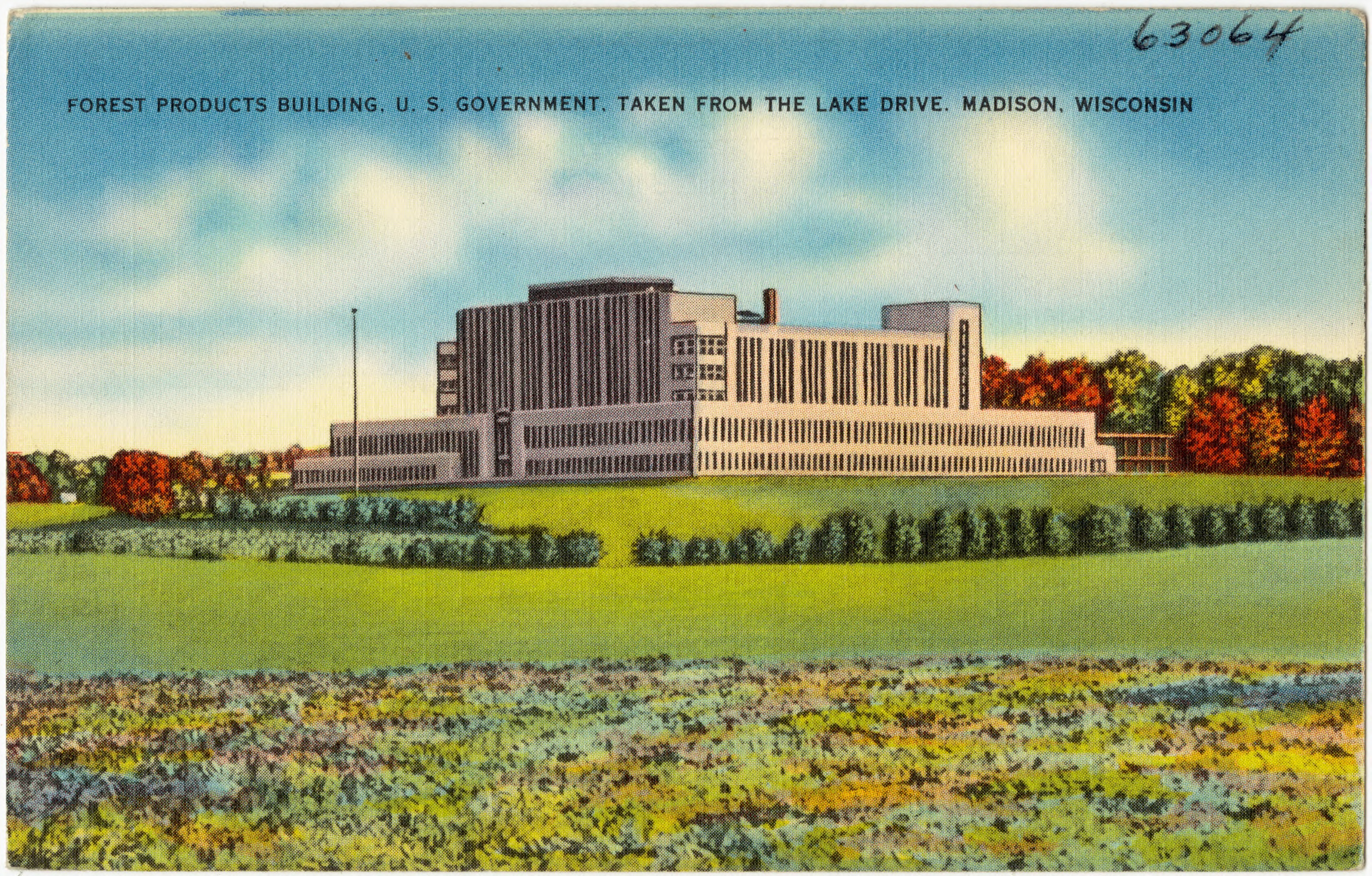
Forest Products Laboratory

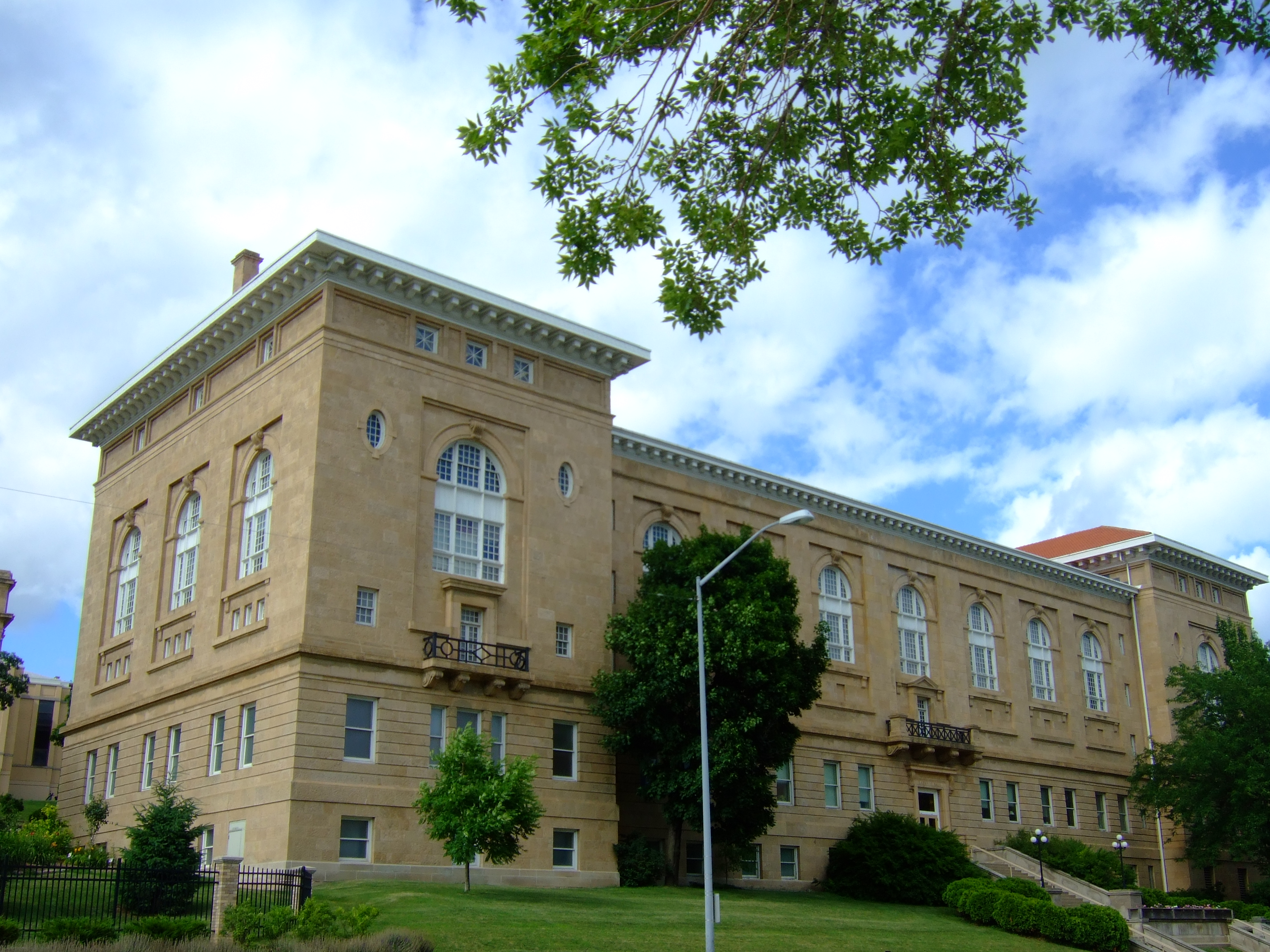
Lathrop Hall

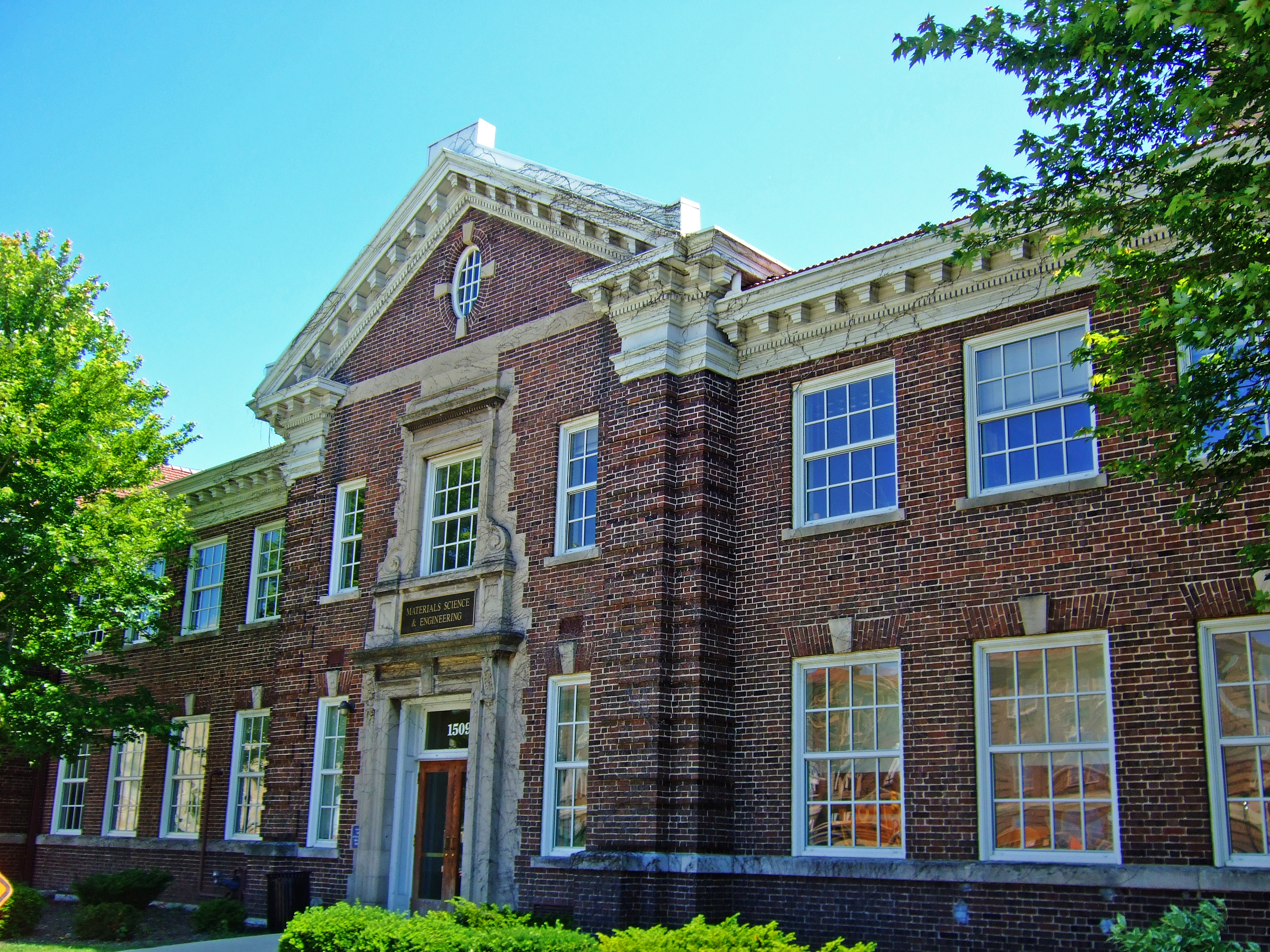
Materials Science & Engineering Building

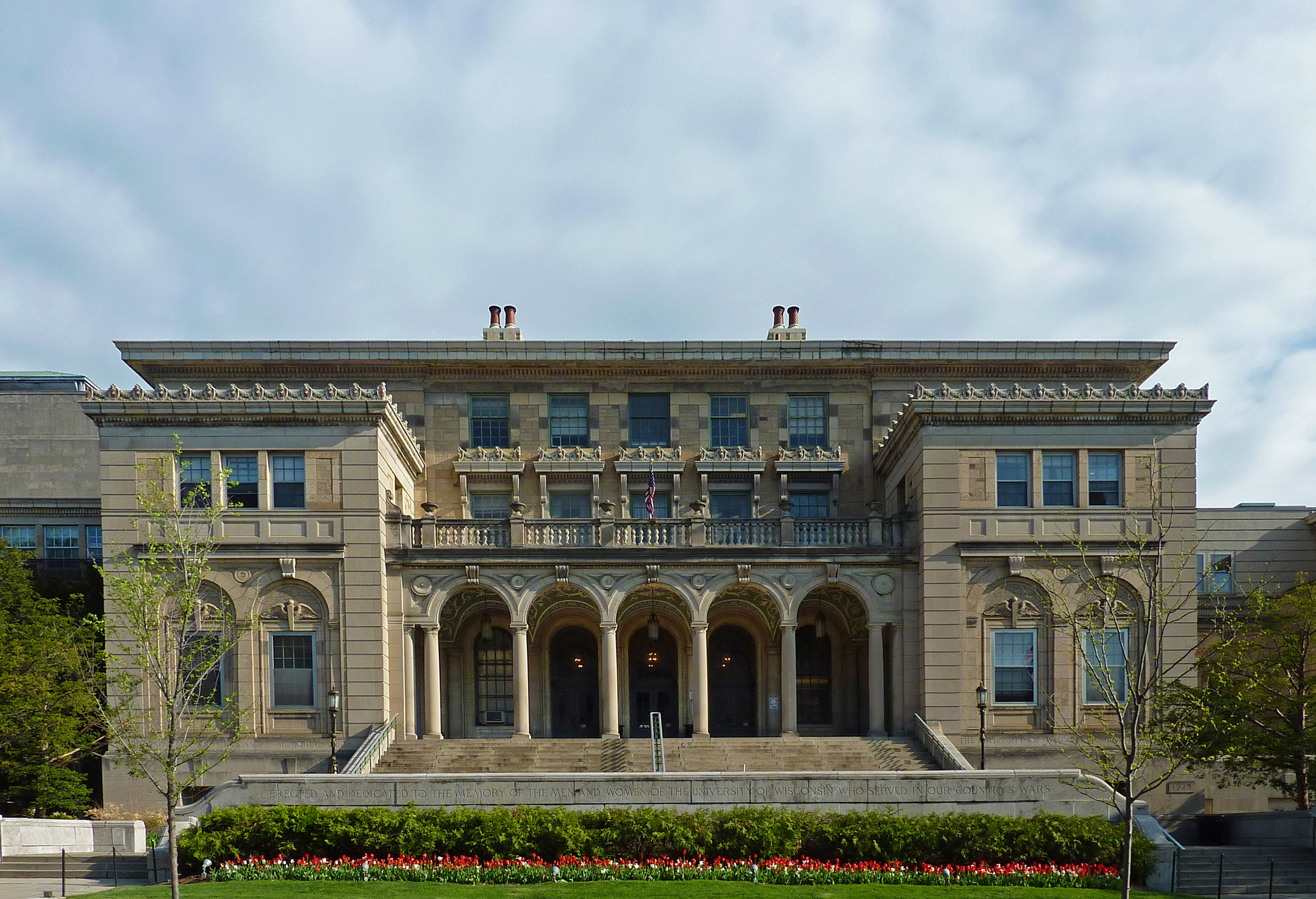
Memorial Union

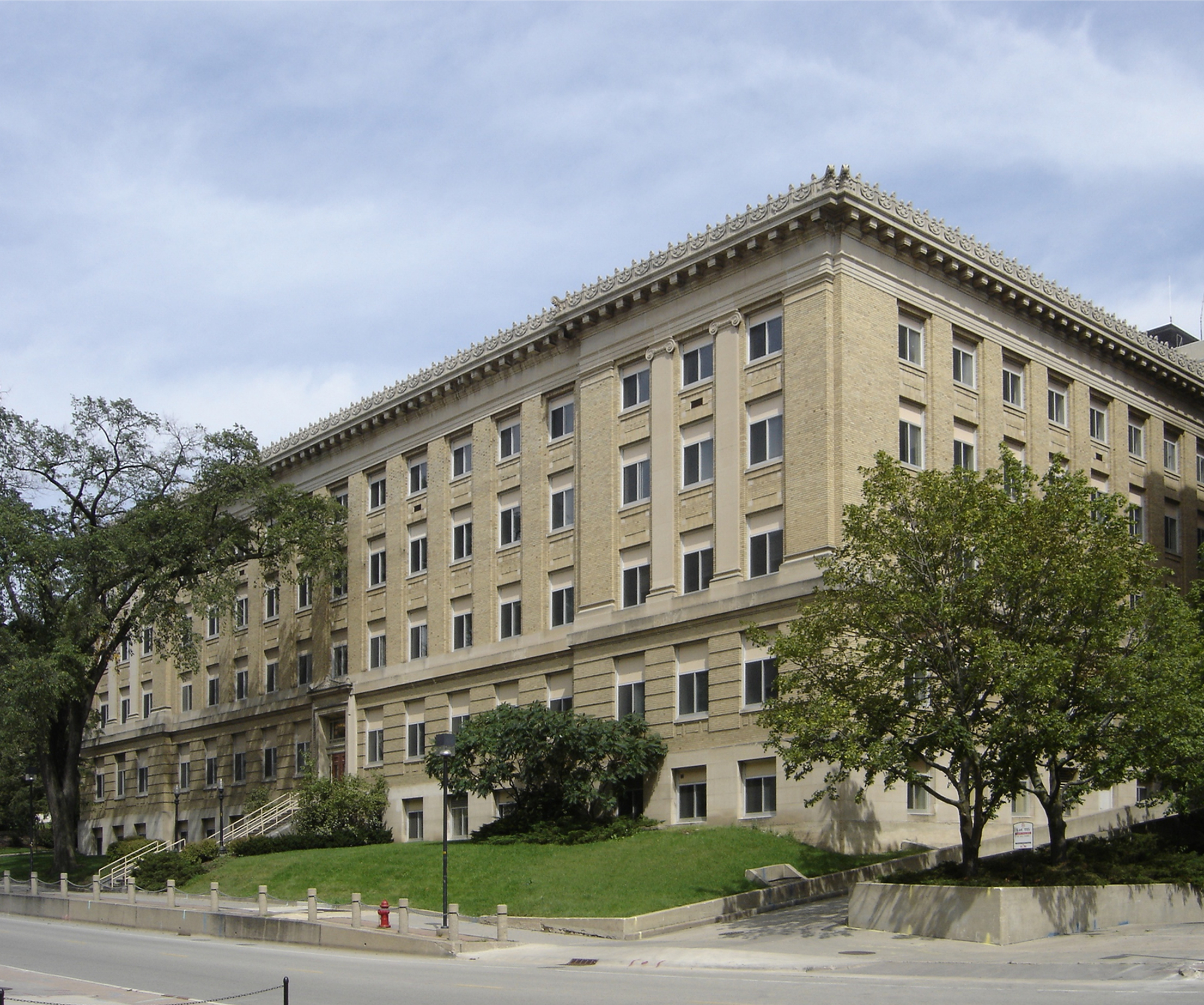
Sterling Hall

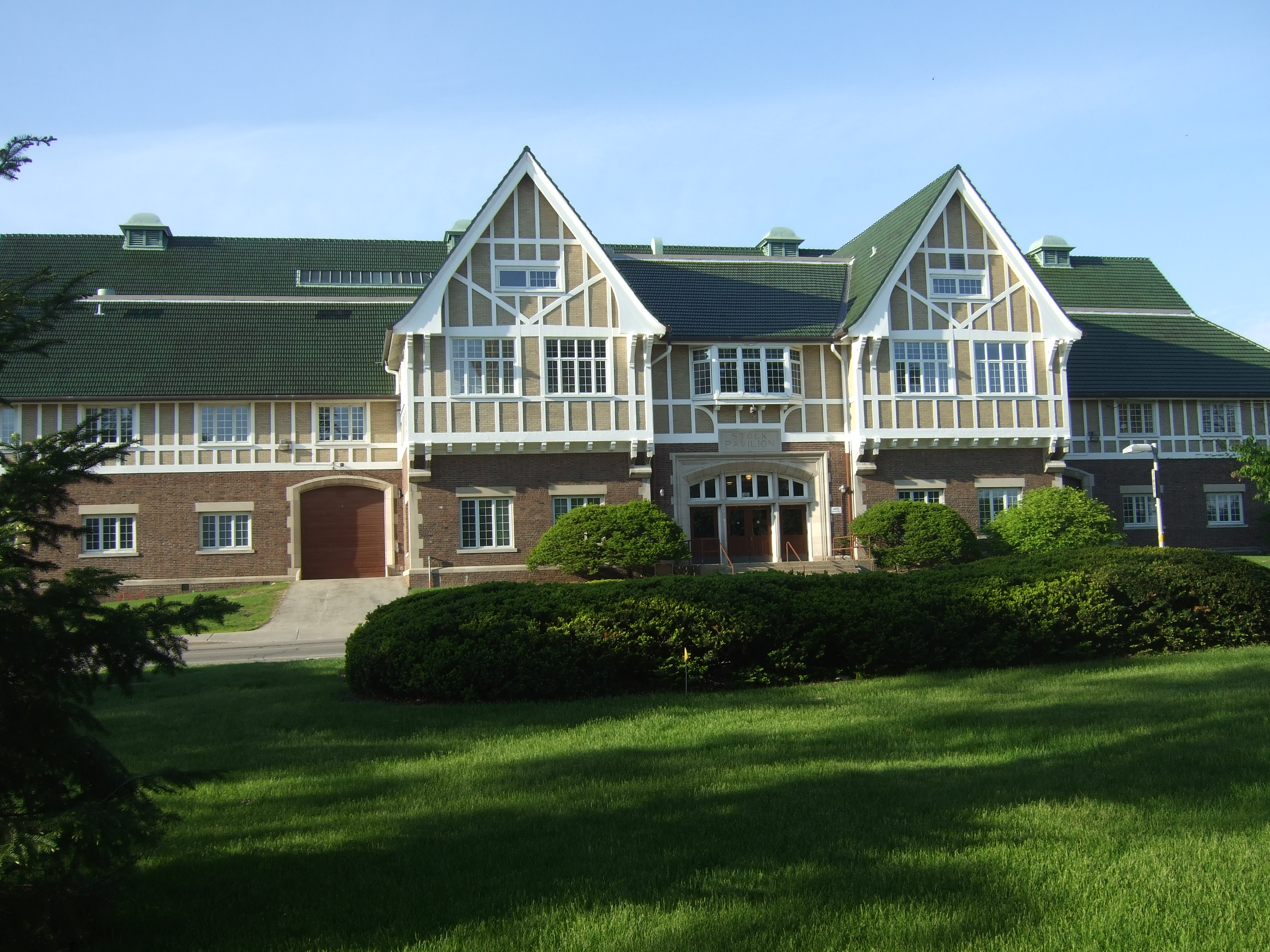
Stock Pavilion

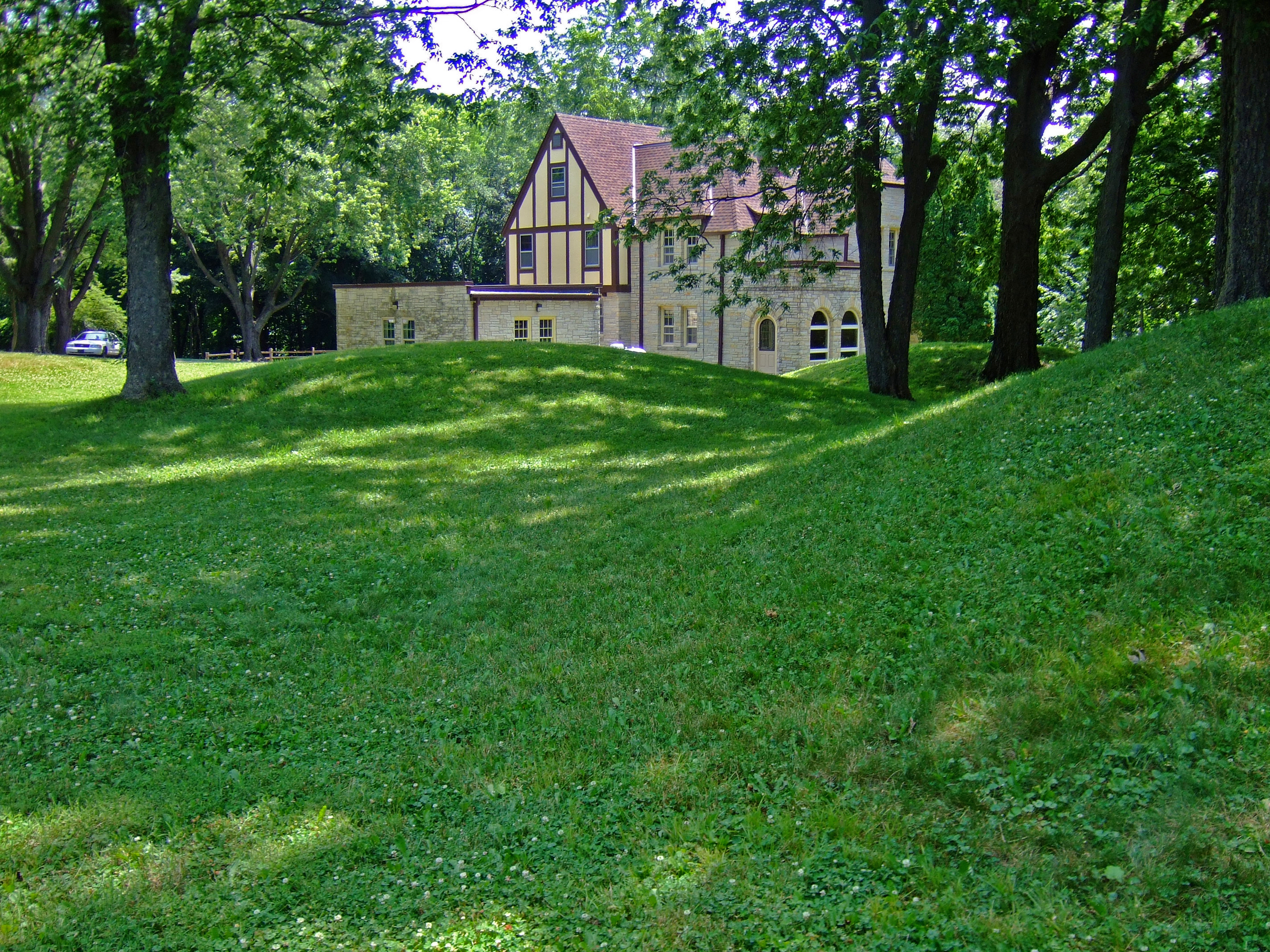
Urben House

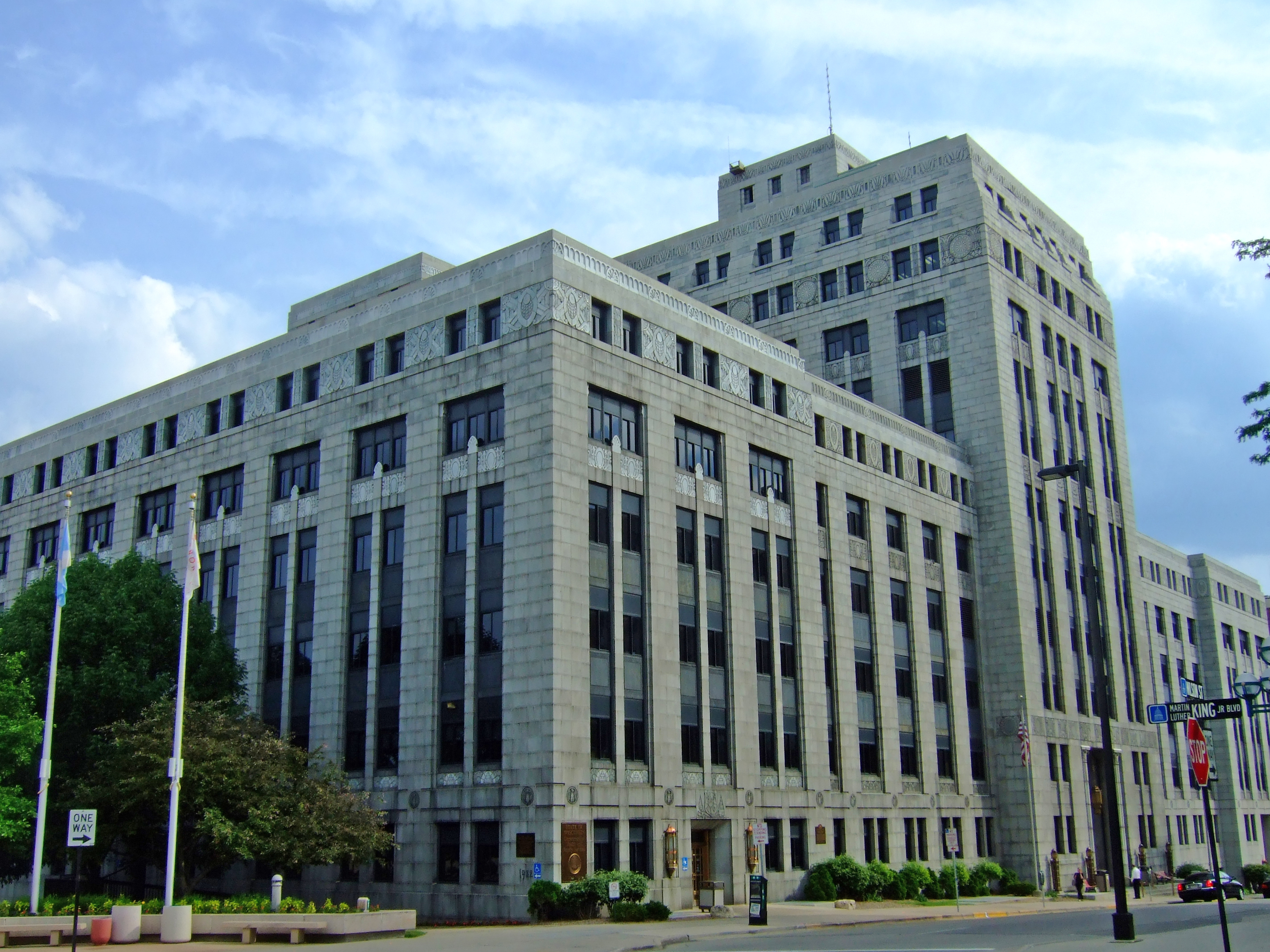
Wisconsin State Office Building

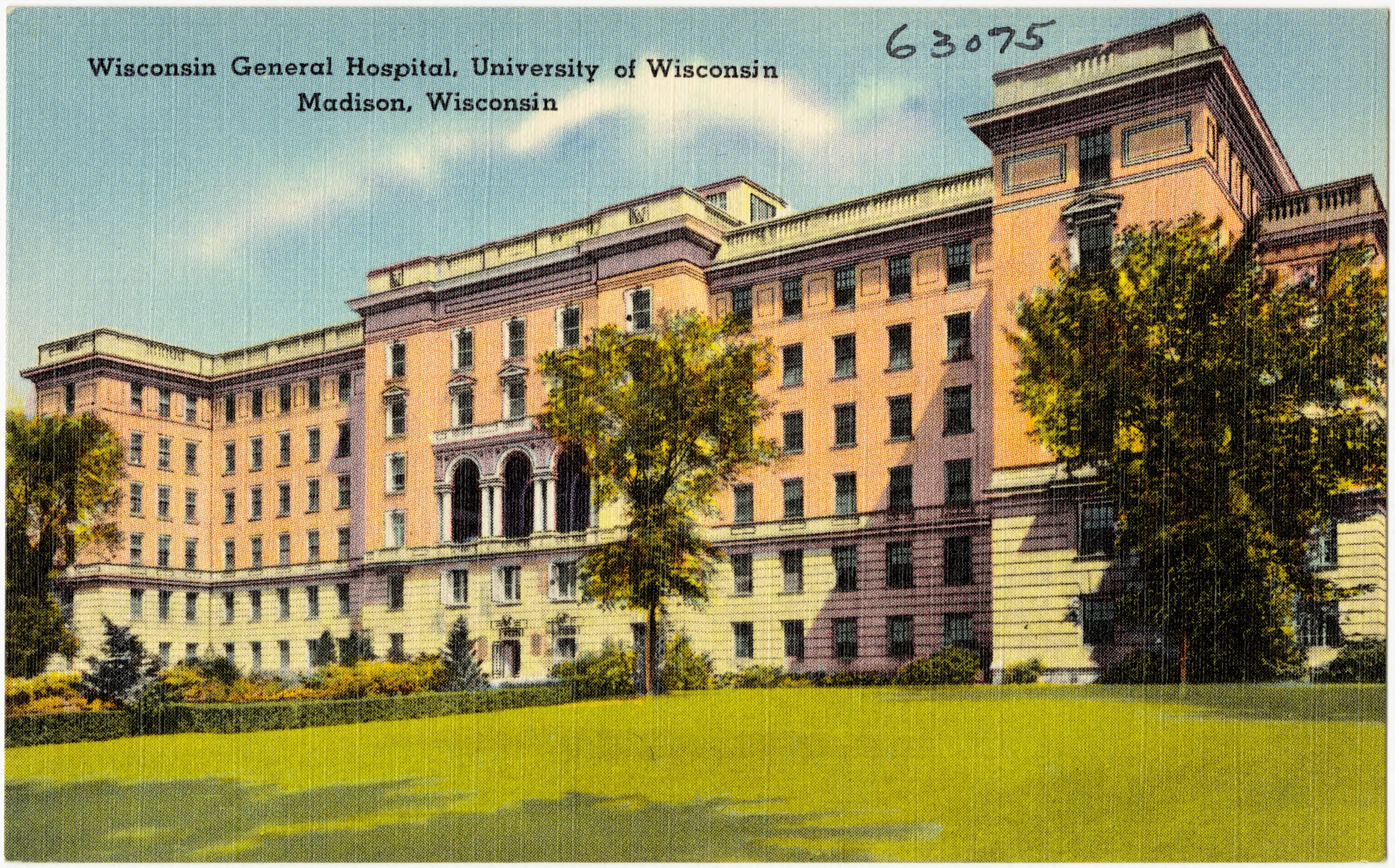
Wisconsin General Hospital
