= University of Wisconsin Dairy Barn =

- U.S. National Register of Historic Places
- U.S. National Historic Landmark
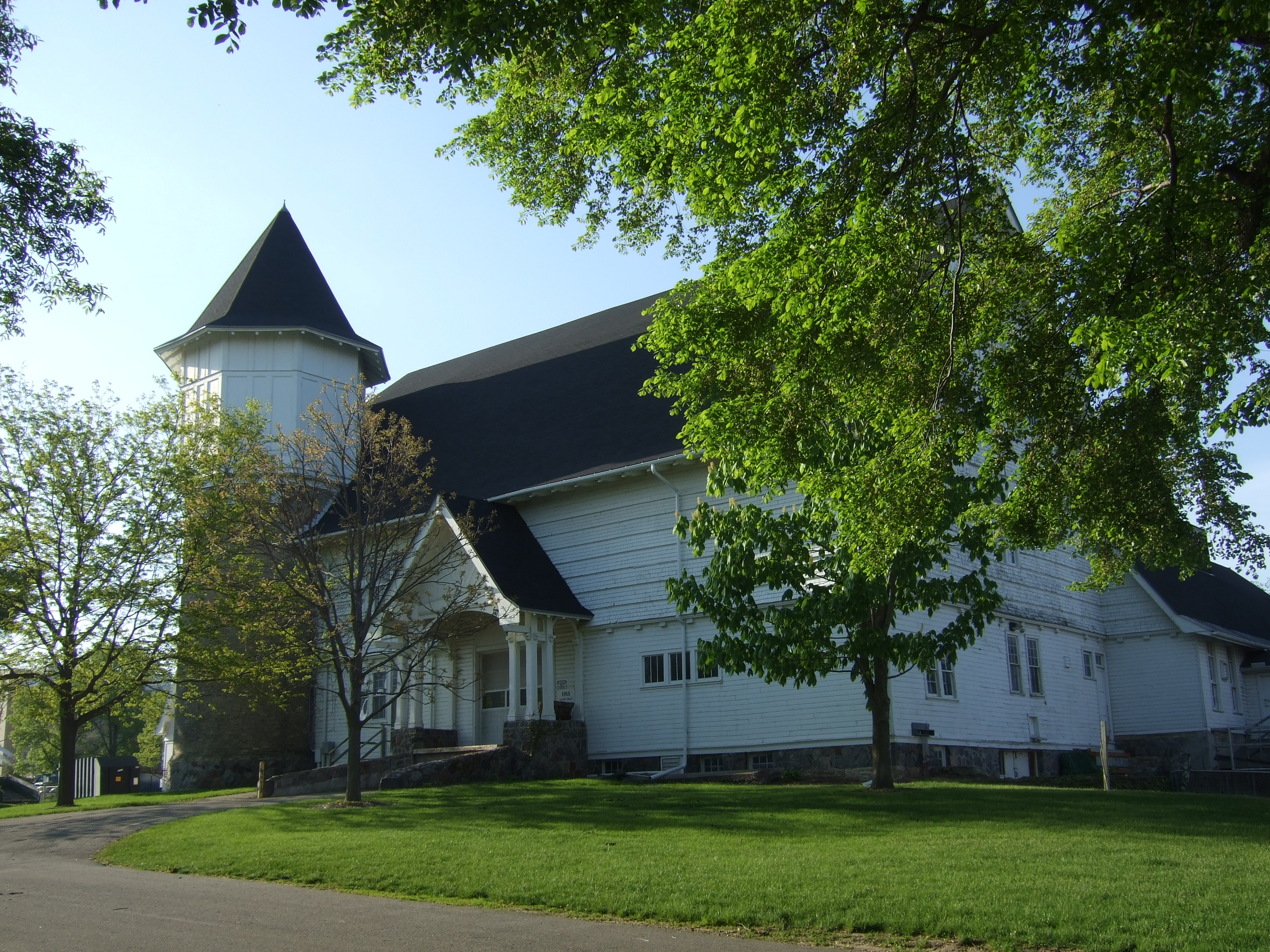

- Location within Wisconsin Location within the United States
- Location: 1915 Linden Dr., Madison, Wisconsin
- Coordinates: 43°4′28.37″N 89°25′5.76″W
- Built: 1897
- Architect: J.T.W. Jennings; Arthur Peabody
- Architectural style: Late 19th And 20th Century Revivals
- NRHP reference No.: 02000600

Significant dates
- Added to NRHP: May 31, 2002
- Designated NHL: April 5, 2005

The University of Wisconsin Dairy Barn is a building located on the campus of the University of Wisconsin–Madison. Built in 1897, the building played an important role in the field of dairy science during the 20th century. It has been used both as a teaching facility and as a site for agricultural research. It is significant for its association with the single-grain experiment, performed from 1907 to 1911 by Stephen Babcock. The UW Dairy Barn was declared a National Historic Landmark in 2005.

== Architecture ==
The main section of the dairy barn was the first part built, in 1897-1898. The exterior was designed by J.T.W. Jennings of Chicago, inspired by historical barns of Normandy, in the northwest of France. Elements of that style are the half-timbering and decorative brickwork. Original elements no longer present are cupolas, dormer windows, and decorative bargeboards. That original construction included the brick silo, two livestock barns attached at the rear, and between them a classroom and judging area.

Today's Dairy Barn is a complex of six attached buildings. The main dairy barn fronts the complex along Linden Avenue and is 86 by 50 feet (26 m × 15 m). A trio of buildings is attached at the rear (south): a 70 by 30 feet (21.3 m × 9.1 m) young livestock barn on the west, a 70 by 40 feet (21 m × 12 m) classroom and stock judging area in the center, and a 70 by 40 feet (21 m × 12 m) cow barn on the east. Also attached to the barn is a 60 by 35 feet (18 m × 11 m) litter shed, a 40 by 20 feet (12.2 m × 6.1 m) milk shed, and a 70 by 35 feet (21 m × 11 m) livestock barn. Tracks from the Chicago, Milwaukee, St. Paul and Pacific Railroad run just to the south of the complex.

== History ==
The University of Wisconsin, founded in 1848, initially offered a classical education, with studies focused on geography, English grammar, Latin and Greek. After the university accepted the land grant offered by the Morrill Act of 1862, it added more practical subjects. The UW added a farm west of campus, and a professor of agriculture was added in 1868, but the ag curriculum was still academic (trigonometry, physiology, political economy, etc.), and it attracted few students. In the 1880s the ag program began working with farmers, offering the Farmer's Institute, the Short Course, and the Dairy Course, to help people who were already farmers.

The University of Wisconsin College of Agriculture was founded in 1889. Founding dean William Arnon Henry moved the program from South Hall onto its own, four-building campus. Henry became a leading researcher and writer on feeding livestock, especially after the 1898 publication of his Feeds and Feeding. Stephen Moulton Babcock, the department chair of agricultural chemistry, convinced Henry to build a station to study cattle feeding. Initially, Henry refused because he did not believe a chemist could appropriately study the field. Babcock continued to petition the university for the building and finally animal husbandman W. L. Carlyle agreed in 1897.

Carlyle and Babcock set up an experiment testing if salt was required in a dairy cow's diet. When one of their eight salt-deprived cows died, the experiment was halted. In 1901, Henry consented to allow Babcock to oversee an experiment comparing feed types, though he limited it to two animals and the experiment had inconclusive results. In 1907, after establishing a long-term testing plan, Babcock started the single-grain experiment. Cattle received rations from a single plant, though they were balanced so that each animal received sufficient nutrients. By the time the experiment ended in 1911, it was clear that the corn-fed group was significantly healthier than those fed oats, wheat, or a mixture of the three. The study was published that June and catalyzed the international study of nutrition.

Other important research conducted in the barn complex include improvements to a Brucellosis test in 1912, measures against Johne's disease around 1917, discovery of causes of milk fever from 1932 to 1947, identifying animals for selective breeding in the early 20th century, artificial insemination technology in the 1930s, and gonadotropic hormone studies in the 1940s. Testing techniques for bovine tuberculosis were taught in the barn from 1898 to 1908, which led to eradicating the disease in Wisconsin.

In 2005 the UW Dairy Barn was granted National Historic Landmark status because its basement housed the cattle that participated in the single-grain experiment - a step toward our modern understanding of nutrition. Aside from that experiment, the Dairy Barn is eligible for listing on the National Register of Historic Places for other research and education efforts conducted in the building, partially listed above.

== See also ==
- List of National Historic Landmarks in Wisconsin
- National Register of Historic Places listings in Madison, Wisconsin
