= List of University of Connecticut people =

This is a list of notable alumni and faculty from the University of Connecticut

== Alumni ==
=== Academics ===
==== Academic administrators ====
- Stanley F. Battle – 12th chancellor: North Carolina A&T State University; 4th president: Coppin State University
- Raymond C. Bowen – 2nd president: La Guardia Community College; president: Shelby State Community College
- Scott S. Cowen – 14th president: Tulane University
- Thomas C. Duffy – former deputy dean: Yale School of Music
- Martha Piper – 14th president: University of British Columbia
- Joseph W. Polisi – 6th president: The Juilliard School
- William E. Trueheart – 7th president: Bryant University
- Gregory S. Woodward – 6th president: University of Hartford

==== Scholars and critics of literature, art and ethics ====
- Deborah Dancy – professor of painting
- Slawomir Dobrzanski – Kansas State University professor of music
- Bobbie Ann Mason – literary critic and novelist
- Michael North – literary critic
- Tim Page – Pulitzer Prize-winning music critic
- Elaine Scarry – Harvard literature professor

==== Scholars of law and political scientists ====
- Edward C. Banfield – political scientist
- Richard Dekmejian – political scientist
- Florence Roisman – law professor

==== Scholars of the natural sciences ====
- Willard H. Allen (BS, 1916) – poultry scientist and New Jersey secretary of agriculture
- Alan T. Busby (BA, 1918) – animal scientist and first African-American alumnus
- Kartik Chandran (PhD, 1999) – engineer and recipient of a MacArthur Fellowship
- Franklin Chang-Diaz (BS, 1973) – NASA astronaut and physicist
- Carol Lynn Curchoe – molecular biologist
- Margaret Flinter (BSN, PhD) – nurse practitioner and primary care leader
- David Grimaldi – entomologist
- Benjamin Hsiao – materials scientist
- David Lee – Nobel Prize-winning physicist
- Richard Mastracchio – NASA astronaut and engineer
- Lloyd S. Nelson (PhD, 1950) – statistician
- Luz Oliveros-Belardo – National Scientist of the Philippines
- Vijay P. Parashar – oral and maxillofacial radiologist
- Massimo Pigliucci – evolutionary theorist and philosopher
- Jeffrey Rosenfeld – neurosurgeon
- Edmund Ware Sinnott – professor of Botany and Genetics (1915–1928)
- Mika Tosca – climate scientist
- Vincenzo C. Vannicola – electrical engineer
- Talitha Washington – mathematician and STEM activist
- Yuwen Zhang – mechanical engineer

==== Scholars of the social sciences ====
- Kathleen Musante DeWalt – anthropologist
- Ramani Durvasula, PhD – clinical psychologist, media expert, and author
- Samih Farsoun – sociologist and Arab-American activist
- Howard S. Hoffman – experimental psychologist
- Kevin B. MacDonald – evolutionary psychology theorist
- Robert Remez – experimental psychologist
- Philip Rubin – cognitive scientist
- Horatio Strother (BA 1956; MA 1957) – historian and leading authority on the Underground Railroad in Connecticut
- Kevin Swick – educational theorist

=== Arts and entertainment ===
- Pam Arciero – puppeteer
- Jennifer Barnhart – actor and puppeteer
- Michael Bergin – supermodel
- Beau Billingslea – voice actor and former UConn football player
- Tanisha Brito – former Miss Connecticut and Miss Georgia USA
- Jackie Burns – Broadway actress
- Sharon Butler – painter and publisher of NYC art journalTwo Coats of Paint
- Mary Cadorette – actor
- Susanna Coffey (BFA 1977) – artist, educator, and National Academy of Design member
- Judy Collins – musician
- Lui Collins – folk singer-songwriter
- Tristan Couvares – reality TV star
- Scott DaRos – Emmy Award-winning animator
- Andrea Dromm – actress
- Justin Foley – drummer for Killswitch Engage
- Patrick Earl Hammie – contemporary figurative artist
- Matthew Jensen – artist and photographer
- Ned Kahn – environmental artist and MacArthur Fellowship recipient
- Jeremy Leven – author, director, producer, and screenwriter
- Michelle Lombardo – model
- Donny Marshall – television sports broadcaster
- Forrest McClendon – actor
- Moby – singer-songwriter, musician
- Bobby Moynihan – actor and comedian
- Julius R. Nasso – film producer
- Peter Niedmann – composer
- Ron Palillo – actor
- PangaeaPanga – speedrunner, streamer
- Denise Pelletier, BFA – ceramics, sculpture, and site-specific art
- Morris Pleasure – composer, musician
- Toni Press-Coffman – playwright
- Meg Ryan – actress
- Skip Schoolnik – film director and producer
- Leslie Silva – actress
- Rick Sternbach – Emmy-winning illustrator and visual effects artist
- Austin Stowell – actor
- Signe Margaret Stuart – abstract painter
- Oksana Tanasiv – artist
- Tony Todd – actor
- Diane Tuft – photographer
- Paige Turco – actress
- Brad Williams – puppeteer
- Dana Wilson – composer and jazz pianist
- Deborah Zlotsky – visual artist and educator
- Kim Zolciak – television personality

=== Authors, journalists and commentators ===
- Elizabeth Bear (Sarah Bear Elizabeth Wishnevsky) – author
- Richard Bernstein – journalist and author
- Michael Bradford – playwright, artistic director, and AUDELCO nominee
- Leslie Brody – non-fiction author
- P. W. Catanese – author
- Robert D. Kaplan – author and essayist
- Dawn Lundy Martin – poet, essayist, and activist
- Leigh Montville – sports journalist
- Les Payne (B.A., 1964) – Pulitzer Prize-winning journalist and co-founder of the National Association of Black Journalists
- Ann Lane Petry – novelist
- Randall Pinkston – news correspondent
- Joel Rosenberg – science fiction author
- Ron Roy (B.A. 1965) – children's literature author
- Lewis Turco – poet
- David Ushery – WNBC news anchor

=== Business and industry ===
- Doug Bernstein – co-founder: Melissa & Doug
- Scott Case (BS, 1992) – co-founder and former CTO: Priceline.com
- Robert Diamond – former CEO: Barclays; co-founder: Atlas Mara Limited
- Kimberly Eddleston – professor of Entrepreneurship & Innovation at D'Amore-McKim School of Business
- Clifford Grodd – former president and CEO: Paul Stuart
- Viren Kapadia – president and CEO: Gyrus Systems
- Bob Kaufman – co-founder of Bob's Discount Furniture
- Kathleen Murphy – investor at Fidelity Investments
- Timothy Shriver – chairman: Special Olympics; member of Kennedy family
- William S. Simon – former executive vice president: Walmart
- Annie Withey – co-founder of Smartfood and Annie's Homegrown
- Vincent Zarrilli – founder of The Pot Shop

=== Civic leaders and activists ===
- Lottie B. Scott – civic leader and African-American civil rights advocate

=== Diplomacy, government, law, and politics ===
==== Elected officials ====
- Bryan Anderson – alder of New Haven (1992–1994) and alderman of Milford (2011–2019)
- Chuck Benedict – Wisconsin State Assemblyman (2004–2010)
- Francisco L. Borges – Connecticut state treasurer (1987–1993)
- Natalie Braswell (BA 2000, MPA 2002, JD 2007) – Connecticut state comptroller (2021–2023)
- Thomas W. Bucci – 49th mayor of Bridgeport, Connecticut (1985–1989)
- Shari Cantor – mayor of West Hartford, Connecticut (2016–present)
- Eric D. Coleman – former Connecticut state senator (1995–2017)
- Joe Courtney – U.S. representative for CT-2
- Emilio Q. Daddario – former U.S. representative for CT-1 (1959–1971)
- Andy Dinniman – Pennsylvania state senator for the 19th district (2006–present)
- Art Feltman – former Connecticut state representative (1997–2009)
- John Fetterman (MBA 1993) – U.S. senator from Pennsylvania (2023–present), lieutenant governor of Pennsylvania (2019–2023)
- Sam Gejdenson – former U.S. representative for CT-2 (1981–2001)
- Robert Giaimo – former U.S. representative for CT-3 (1959–1981)
- Dorothy Goodwin (PhD 1957) – former Connecticut state representative (1974–1984)
- Bernard F. Grabowski – former U.S. representative for CT-6 (1963–1967)
- Edward M. Kennedy, Jr. – Connecticut state senator (2015–2019); member of Kennedy family
- Mike Lawlor – former Connecticut state representative (1987–2011)
- Martin Looney – Connecticut state senator, pres. pro tem. (1993–present)
- Konstantina Lukes – former mayor of Worcester, Massachusetts (2007–2010)
- Shaun McNally – former Connecticut state representative (1987–1992)
- Chris Murphy – U.S. senator for Connecticut (2013–present)
- Lewis Rome – Connecticut State Senate leader (1973–1979) and Republican Party nominee in the 1982 Connecticut gubernatorial election
- William St. Onge – former U.S. representative for CT-2 (1963–1970)
- Ronald A. Sarasin – former U.S. representative for CT-5 (1973–1979)
- Pedro Segarra – former mayor of Hartford, Connecticut (2010–2015)
- Kevin B. Sullivan – former Connecticut state senator, pres. pro tem. (1987–2004)
- David J. Valesky – New York state senator (2005–2018)
- Robert Ward – minority leader of the Connecticut House of Representatives (1995–2007)
- Elmer Watson (BS 1929) – Connecticut State Senate majority leader (1957–1959)

==== Judges and attorneys ====
- Bethany Alvord – judge: Connecticut Appellate Court
- Vanessa Lynne Bryant – U.S. district judge: D. Conn.
- Carol Ann Conboy – associate justice: New Hampshire Supreme Court (2009–2017)
- Alfred V. Covello – chief U.S. district judge: D. Conn. (1992–2003)
- John A. Danaher III – judge: Connecticut Superior Court
- Gregory D’Auria – associate justice: Connecticut Supreme Court
- Alexandra Davis DiPentima – chief judge: Connecticut Appellate Court
- Christopher F. Droney – U.S. circuit judge: 2d Cir.
- Fernande R.V. Duffly – associate justice: Supreme Judicial Court of Massachusetts (2011–2016)
- Dennis G. Eveleigh – associate justice: Connecticut Supreme Court
- Lubbie Harper Jr. – associate justice: Connecticut Supreme Court (2011–12)
- Wesley W. Horton – Connecticut appellate court lawyer
- Denise R. Johnson – associate justice: Vermont Supreme Court (1990–2011)
- Joette Katz – associate justice: Connecticut Supreme Court (1992–2011)
- Christine Keller – judge: Connecticut Appellate Court (2013–present)
- Douglas Lavine – judge: Connecticut Appellate Court (2006–present
- Robert J. Lynn – associate justice: New Hampshire Supreme Court
- Seth Marnin – New York Court of Claims; first openly transgender male judge in the U.S.
- Andrew J. McDonald – associate justice: Connecticut Supreme Court
- Thomas Joseph Meskill – chief U.S. circuit judge: 2d Cir. (1975–1993); governor of Connecticut (1971–1975)
- Kevin J. O'Connor – 15th U.S. associate attorney general (2008–2009)
- Richard N. Palmer – associate justice: Connecticut Supreme Court
- Rosemary S. Pooler – U.S. circuit judge: 2d Cir.
- Mickey Sherman – criminal defense attorney
- Christine S. Vertefeuille – associate justice: Connecticut Supreme Court (2000–2010)
- William A. Webb – U.S. magistrate judge: E.D.N.C. (1999–2014)
- Omar A. Williams – U.S. district judge: D. Conn.

==== Diplomats, government officials and party leaders ====
- Richard Calder – former senior official at the CIA
- Miguel Cardona – CT commissioner of education; US secretary of education (2021-25)
- Bill Curry – former counselor to the president in Clinton administration (1995–1997)
- Charles A. Duelfer – former special apaidvisor: director of Central Intelligence
- J. Michael Farren – former dep. White House counsel in George W. Bush administration (2007–2009)
- C. Frank Figliuzzi – former assistant director for Counterintelligence at the FBI (2011–2012)
- Louis O. Giuffrida – former director: FEMA (1981–1985)
- Eliot A. Jardines – former asst. dep. director of National Intelligence for Open Source (2005–2008)
- Jerold Mande (BA 1978) – former USDA deputy under secretary for Food Safety; lead designer of the Nutrition facts food label
- Mark J. Marcus – former commissioner: Connecticut Department of Children and Families (1970s–80s)
- Brett H. McGurk – special presidential envoy for the Global Coalition to Counter ISIL, National Security Council coordinator for the Middle East and North Africa
- Alfonso Múnera Cavadía – Colombian ambassador to Jamaica and Guyana and former secretary general of the Association of Caribbean States (2012–2016)
- Sam Webb – former chairman: Communist Party USA (2000–2014)

==== Foreign officials ====
- Hajim al-Hassani – former speaker of the Iraqi National Assembly under the Iraqi Transitional Government
- Bona Arsenault – former member of Parliament of Canada (1945–1957)
- Tansu Çiller – 22nd prime minister of Turkey (1993–1996)

=== Military ===
- Francis J. Evon Jr. – adjutant general of Connecticut, major general
- Willis Nichols Hawley – United States Army first sergeant
- Samuel Jaskilka – United States Marine Corps general
- Carl Kimmons – United States Navy officer; first person to rise through the ranks from mess attendant to commissioned officer
- Charles D. Luckey – United States Army lieutenant general
- Kenneth North – United States Air Force brigadier general
- Robert W. RisCassi – United States Army general
- Regina Rush-Kittle – United States Army Reserve command sergeant major
- Cornelius E. Ryan – United States Army major general
- Paul A. Yost Jr. – United States Coast Guard commandant

=== Sports ===
==== Baseball ====
- Nick Ahmed – MLB shortstop for the Arizona Diamondbacks
- Matt Barnes – MLB pitcher for the 2018 World Series Champion Boston Red Sox
- Jesse Carlson – MLB pitcher for the Toronto Blue Jays
- Rajai Davis – MLB outfielder for the Cleveland Indians
- Walt Dropo – former all-star Major League Baseball first baseman, 1950 MLB Rookie of the Year Award winner (American League)
- Billy Eppler – MLB general manager
- Jeff Fulchino – MLB pitcher for the Houston Astros
- Jason Grabowski – former Major League Baseball player
- Dan Iassogna – Major League Baseball umpire
- L. J. Mazzilli – Minor League Baseball player
- Charles Nagy – former all-star Major League Baseball pitcher
- Mike Olt – MLB infielder
- Jim Penders – UConn baseball coach
- Bob Schaefer – bench coach for the Los Angeles Dodgers and former manager for the Kansas City Royals
- Rollie Sheldon – former MLB pitcher, member of the 1961 and 1962 World Series Champion New York Yankees
- George Springer – MLB outfielder for the Houston Astros, 2017 World Series Champion and Most Valuable Player
- Pete Walker – former Toronto Blue Jays pitcher and current Toronto Blue Jays pitching coach
- Gary Waslewski – MLB pitcher

==== Men's basketball ====
- Brendan Adams (born 2000) – basketball player in the Israeli Basketball Premier League
- Jalen Adams (born 1995) – basketball player for Hapoel Jerusalem in the Israeli Basketball Premier League
- Jeff Adrien – power forward for the Charlotte Bobcats
- Chuck Aleksinas – former center for the Golden State Warriors
- Ray Allen – fifth pick in the 1996 NBA draft Inducted to the Basketball Hall of Fame as part of the class of 2018
- Hilton Armstrong – 12th pick in 2006 NBA draft, (New Orleans Hornets) forward/center
- Josh Boone – 23rd pick in the 2006 NBA draft (New Jersey Nets)
- Denham Brown – 40th pick in the 2006 NBA draft (Seattle SuperSonics)
- Scott Burrell – first American draft pick for MLB and NBA, played in the NBA 1995–2001
- Caron Butler – tenth pick in 2002 NBA draft, (Los Angeles Clippers) guard
- Uri Cohen-Mintz (born 1973) – Israeli player in the Israeli Basketball Premier League and for the Israeli national basketball team
- Andre Drummond – ninth overall pick in the 2012 NBA draft by the Detroit Pistons
- Jerome Dyson (born 1987) – player for Hapoel Jerusalem of the Israeli Basketball Premier League
- Khalid El-Amin – former Chicago Bulls guard
- Harrison Fitch – UConn's first African-American basketball player
- Rudy Gay – NBA; eighth overall pick in 2006 NBA draft, Memphis Grizzlies guard
- Tate George – former basketball player for the New Jersey Nets and Milwaukee Bucks
- Ben Gordon – third pick in 2004 NBA draft, Charlotte Bobcats guard
- Daniel Hamilton – 56th pick in 2016 NBA draft, Oklahoma City Thunder
- Richard Hamilton – seventh pick in 1999 NBA draft, Detroit Pistons guard
- Toby Kimball – former NBA forward, played for six teams, spent most of his career with the San Diego Rockets
- Travis Knight – former NBA player, 29th pick in 1996 NBA draft, center
- Bruce Kuczenski – former NBA forward/center
- Jeremy Lamb – former NBA guard/forward, 12th pick in the 2012 NBA draft
- Ater Majok – 58th pick in the 2011 NBA draft by the Los Angeles Lakers
- Donyell Marshall – fourth pick in 1994 NBA draft
- Shabazz Napier – 24th overall pick in the 2014 NBA draft, Portland Trail Blazers
- Emeka Okafor – second pick in 2004 NBA draft, center
- Kevin Ollie – former NBA guard, former UConn basketball head coach
- Worthy Patterson – St. Louis Hawks and Scranton Miners guard
- Tom Penders – head men's basketball coach at the University of Houston
- A. J. Price – 52nd pick on the 2009 NBA draft, point guard for the Washington Wizards
- Rodney Purvis – guard for the Orlando Magic
- Clifford Robinson – basketball player for the New Jersey Nets
- Stanley Robinson – 59th pick in the 2010 NBA draft by the Orlando Magic
- Adama Sanogo (born 2002) – Malian basketball player in the Israeli Basketball Premier League
- Doron Sheffer – former Israeli basketball superstar
- Chris Smith – former Minnesota Timberwolves guard
- Bob Staak – former Wake Forest University and NBA coach
- Hasheem Thabeet – second pick in the 2009 NBA draft to the Memphis Grizzlies
- Corny Thompson – former NBA forward for the Dallas Mavericks
- Charlie Villanueva – seventh pick in 2005 NBA draft, (Detroit Pistons) forward
- Christian Vital (born 1997) – player in the Israeli Basketball Premier League
- Jake Voskuhl – center currently playing for the Charlotte Bobcats
- Kemba Walker – ninth pick in the 2011 NBA draft by the Charlotte Bobcats
- Marcus Williams – 22nd pick in 2006 NBA draft, (New Jersey Nets) guard

==== Women's basketball ====
- Svetlana Abrosimova – WNBA, Minnesota Lynx, the Connecticut Sun and the Seattle Storm
- Ashley Battle – WNBA, New York Liberty
- Sue Bird – retired from the WNBA after a 20-year career with the Seattle Storm; first overall pick in the 2002 WNBA draft; five-time Olympic champion
- Paige Bueckers – WNBA, Dallas Wings; first overall pick in the 2025 WNBA draft
- Swin Cash – WNBA, Seattle Storm; second overall pick in the 2002 WNBA draft
- Tina Charles – WNBA, Connecticut Sun; first overall pick in the 2010 WNBA draft
- Azzi Fudd – WNBA, Dallas Wings; first overall pick in the 2026 WNBA draft
- Kalana Greene – WNBA, Connecticut Sun
- Charde Houston – WNBA, Minnesota Lynx
- Asjha Jones – WNBA, Connecticut Sun
- Rebecca Lobo – WNBA player; ESPN analyst
- Renee Montgomery – former WNBA player; now an executive and part-owner of her final WNBA team, the Atlanta Dream
- Jessica Moore – WNBA, Los Angeles Sparks
- Maya Moore – first overall pick in the 2011 WNBA draft, WNBA Minnesota Lynx
- Shea Ralph – WNBA, Utah Starzz; current head coach at Vanderbilt University
- Jennifer Rizzotti – WNBA; University of Hartford women's head coach
- Nykesha Sales – WNBA Connecticut Sun
- Kelly Schumacher – WNBA player for the Indiana Fever
- Breanna Stewart – WNBA, first overall pick in 2016 WNBA draft, Seattle Storm
- Ann Strother – WNBA, Atlanta Dream
- Ketia Swanier – WNBA, Phoenix Mercury
- Diana Taurasi – first overall pick in the 2004 WNBA draft, five-time Olympic champion, Phoenix Mercury
- Barbara Turner – Mersin Büyükşehir Belediyesi S.K. Women's Basketball
- Tamika Williams – WNBA Connecticut Sun; head coach of the Indian National Team
- Kara Wolters – WNBA center for the Houston Comets; analyst for Connecticut radio network

==== Football ====
- Andrew Adams – Tennessee Titans safety
- Deon Anderson – former Dallas Cowboys fullback
- Will Beatty – New York Giants offensive tackle
- Tyvon Branch – Oakland Raiders safety
- Cody Brown – NFL linebacker
- Donald Brown – running back for the Indianapolis Colts
- Darius Butler – Indianapolis Colts cornerback
- Gardner Dow – center; died from head trauma during the 1919 season opener
- Marcus Easley – Buffalo Bills wide receiver
- Kirk Ferentz – Iowa Hawkeyes football head coach
- Alfred Fincher – New Orleans Saints linebacker
- Nick Giaquinto – NFL tailback, member of the Super Bowl XVII champion Washington Redskins
- Byron Jones – Dallas Cowboys cornerback
- Brian Kozlowski – former NFL fullback/tight end
- Greg Lloyd, Jr. – Indianapolis Colts linebacker
- Robert McClain – Atlanta Falcons cornerback
- Eric Naposki – NFL and Barcelona Dragons linebacker and convicted murderer
- Dan Orlovsky – Tampa Bay Buccaneers quarterback
- Kendall Reyes – San Diego Chargers defensive end
- Sam Rutigliano – former Cleveland Browns head coach
- Anthony Sherman – Kansas City Chiefs fullback
- Shane Stafford – Arena Football League quarterback
- Donald Thomas – New England Patriots guard
- Jordan Todman – Jacksonville Jaguars running back
- Lawrence Wilson – New Orleans Saints linebacker

==== Men's hockey ====
- Todd Krygier – NHL left-winger
- Maxim Letunov – NHL center
- Cole Schneider – AHL and NHL right-winger
- Tage Thompson – NHL center

==== Men's soccer ====
- Andre Blake – goalkeeper for Philadelphia Union and Jamaica national football team
- Kevin Burns – midfielder for the Columbus Crew
- Chukwudi Chijindu – striker for Chivas USA
- George Fochive – midfielder for the Portland Timbers
- Josh Ford – goalkeeper for Seattle Sounders FC
- Chris Gbandi – former player for FC Dallas
- Julius James – defender for the Columbus Crew
- Andrew Jean-Baptiste – defender for the NY Red Bulls
- Cyle Larin – striker for Beşiktaş and Canada men's national soccer team
- Damani Ralph – former Chicago Fire player and FC Rubin Kazan striker
- Bobby Rhine – former player for FC Dallas
- Toni Stahl – midfielder for the Fort Lauderdale Strikers
- Shavar Thomas – soccer player for the Philadelphia Union
- Kwame Watson-Siriboe – defender for the Chicago Fire
- O'Brian White – striker for Seattle Sounders FC

==== Women's soccer ====
- Niki Cross – forward for Houston Dash of the National Women's Soccer League
- Rachel Hill – forward for Orlando Pride of the NWSL
- Stephanie Labbé – Olympic bronze medalist, Canadian goalkeeper
- Sara Whalen (born 1976) – Olympic silver medalist

==== Other ====
- Dan Cramer – mixed martial artist for Bellator and UFC Fighting Championships
- Noah Dines – professional skier and world record holder for most human powered vertical feet skied in a single calendar year (3,590,097 feet)
- Emily Durgin – professional distance runner
- Bonnie Stoll – professional racquetball player and fitness trainer

== Faculty ==
=== Current ===
- Yaakov Bar-Shalom – electrical engineer (Board of Trustees Distinguished Professor, Marianne E. Klewin Professor in Engineering)
- Gina Barreca – humor author, contributor to The Hartford Courant (professor of English Literature and feminist theory)
- Jc Beall – Board of Trustees Distinguished (professor of Philosophy)
- Robert L. Birmingham – professor of Law
- Richard D. Brown – professor of History (1971–2007); professor emeritus (2007–present)
- Ann Charters – Beat scholar (professor of English)
- Kenneth Fuchs – Grammy-winning composer (School of Fine Arts)
- Johann Peter Gogarten – evolutionary biologist
- Lewis Gordon – world philosopher (professor of Philosophy)
- Robert A. Gross – historian
- Wally Lamb – author (associate professor of Creative Writing)
- Richard Normand Langlois – economist (professor of Economics)
- Cato T. Laurencin – engineer, physician (university professor of Chemical and Biomolecular Engineering)
- Guozhen Lu – professor of Mathematics
- Earl MacDonald – composer, musician (director of Jazz Studies)
- Ronald Mallett – researcher in time travel (professor of Physics)
- Radenka Maric – engineer (professor of Sustainable Energy; University President)
- Samuel Martinez – cultural anthropologist (professor of Anthropology)
- Ross Miller – literary critic and biographer
- Ruth Millikan – philosopher of language (emeritus professor of Philosophy of the Division of Orthodontics at University of Connecticut School of Dental Medicine
- Chiara Mingarelli – gravitational-wave astrophysicist (professor of Physics)
- Letitia Naigles – professor of Psychological Sciences
- Olu Oguibe – professor of Painting and author
- Sam Pickering – teacher portrayed by Robin Williams in Dead Poets Society (professor of English)
- Joseph Renzulli – gifted education theorist
- Julian Rotter – psychologist (emeritus professor of Psychology)
- Merrill Singer – medical anthropologist (professor of Anthropology)
- Bette Talvacchia – art historian (Board of Trustees Distinguished Professor of Art History Emeritus)
- Mark C. Urban – biologist (associate professor of Ecology and Evolutionary Biology)

=== Former ===
Note: Years and official titles are given when possible.

- Jamie Homero Arjona – professor of Romance and Classical Languages (1932–1967)
- Alexinia Baldwin – PhD alumna and professor of Education (1988–2003)
- Frank Ballard – puppeteer and professor of Dramatic Arts (1956–1989)
- Ann Beattie – novelist and short story writer
- Susan Porter Benson – historian and professor of History (1993–2005)
- Albert Francis Blakeslee – botanist (when it was Connecticut Agricultural College)
- James M. Bobbitt – professor of Chemistry (1956–1991)
- Taylor L. Booth – professor of Computer Science and Engineering
- Weston A. Bousfield – professor of Psychology (1939–1971)
- Arthur Bronwell – professor of Electrical Engineering (1962–1977); dean of the School of Engineering (1962–1970)
- Roger Buckley – professor of History and director of the Asian American Studies Institute
- Francelia Butler – author and expert on children's literature (professor of English, 1968–1992)
- Lien Chan – former vice president of the Republic of China (assistant professor of Political Science, 1967–1968)
- Roger Crossgrove – artist and professor of Art Emeritus (1968–1988)
- Roy D'Andrade – developer of cognitive anthropology
- Irving Gilman Davis – professor of Economics (1919–1939)
- Victor Denenberg – developmental psychobiologist
- Josephine Dolan – UConn's first professor of nursing (1944–1976)
- Richard Eberhart – poet
- James C. Faris – anthropologist (professor of Anthropology and Near Eastern Studies)
- Estelle Feinstein – historian at UConn Stamford (professor of History, 1957–1989)
- Harry L. Garrigus – animal scientist (professor of Animal Husbandry, 1900–1942)
- Brison D. Gooch – historian of 19th-century Europe, taught at UC prior to 1973
- Alfred Gurdon Gulley – professor of Horticulture (1894–1917)
- Eleanor Krohn Herrmann (1935–2012) – professor of Nursing (1987–1997)
- Evan Hill – professor of Journalism (1965–1983)
- Nafe Katter – professor of Theatre (1957–1997)
- J. A. Scott Kelso – neuroscientist (professor of Psychology and Biobehavioral Sciences)
- Susan Kinsolving – poet
- Myron W. Krueger – computer scientist (professor of Computer Science, 1974–85)
- Everett Carll Ladd – political scientist, director of the Roper Center for Public Opinion Research (1964–1999)
- Glenn J. Lesniak – U.S. Army major general
- Alvin Liberman – speech scientist (professor of Psychology)
- Jerauld Manter – professor of Ornithology and Entomology (1912–1953)
- Henry Ruthven Monteith – professor of History and English (1900–1922)
- Marilyn Nelson – professor emeritus of English (1978–) and 2001–06 poet laureate of the State of Connecticut
- Ovide F. Pomerleau – psychologist (professor of Psychiatry [Psychology], 1979–1985)
- Richard Popkin – philosophy historian
- Johnnie Hines Watts Prothro – nutritionist (associate professor of Home Economics, 1963–1967)
- John R. Reed – academic and writer
- Gideon Rodan – biochemist and osteopath (School of Dental Medicine, 1970–1985)
- Charles Schlueter – trumpeter
- Harold Seidman – political scientist and public administration expert (professor of Political Science, 1971–1984)
- Edmund Ware Sinnott – botanist and prolific author (professor of Botany and Genetics, 1915–1928)
- James A. Slater – entomologist (professor of Entomology, 1953–1988)
- Hale Smith – composer (professor of Music, 1970–1984)
- Avo Sõmer – composer and music theorist (professor of Music, 1962–2000)
- M. Estella Sprague – professor of Home Economics (1917–1926); dean of the Division of Home Economics (1920–1926)
- Walter Stemmons – professor of journalism and university editor, 1918–1954
- Ian Stewart – mathematician (visiting professor of Mathematics, 1977–1978
- Lyman Maynard Stowe – physician and first dean of the UConn School of Medicine
- George Safford Torrey – botanist (professor of Botany, 1915–1956)
- Harleigh Trecker – professor of Social Work (1951–1977); dean, School of Social Work, (1968–1977)
- Albert E. Van Dusen – historian; professor of History (1949–1983) and Connecticut state historian (1952–1985)
- Alexey von Schlippe – painter (professor of Art, Avery Point campus, 1963–1982)
- Charles E. Waring – physical chemist (professor of Chemistry, 1946–1979)
- Rex Warner – author and translator (professor of Classics, 1962–1973)
- Helen Turner Watson – nursing educator (associate professor of Nursing, 1965–1983)
- Albert E. Waugh – professor of Economics (1924–1965), provost of the University (1950–1965)
- Sidney Waxman – horticulturist (professor of Ornamental Horticulture, 1957–1991)
- Nathan Whetten – sociologist (professor of Sociology, 1932–1970; dean of the Graduate School, 1940–1970)
- Edwina Whitney – college librarian (1900–1934), assistant professor of German (1926–1934)
- Carolyn Ladd Widmer – dean of the School of Nursing (1942–1967)
- Rollin Williams – professor of Social Work (1957–1985)
- Kenneth G. Wilson – professor of English (1951–1989)
- Wayne Worcester – author and journalist (professor of Journalism)
- Fujia Yang – physicist (visiting professor of Physics)
- Xiangzhong "Jerry" Yang – world animal cloning leader and director of the Center for Regenerative Biology (professor of Animal Science)
- Feenie Ziner – children's literature writer (professor of English, 1974–1994)

== Presidents of the University of Connecticut ==
The following persons have served as president of the University of Connecticut:

No.	Image	President	Term start	Term end	Ref.
Principals of Storrs Agricultural School (1881–1893)
1		Solomon Mead	1881	1882	
acting		Henry P. Armsby	1882	1883	
Presidents of Storrs Agricultural College (1893–1899)
1		Benjamin F. Koons	1883	1898	
Presidents of Connecticut Agricultural College (1899–1933)
2		George Washington Flint	1898	1901	
3		Rufus W. Stimson	1901	1908	
acting		Edwin O. Smith	1908	1908	
4		Charles L. Beach	1908	1928	
acting		Charles B. Gentry	1928	1929	
5		George A. Works	1929	1930	
Presidents of Connecticut State College (1933–1939)
6		Charles C. McCracken	1930	1935	
acting		Charles B. Gentry	1935	1935	
Presidents of the University of Connecticut (1939–present)
7		Albert N. Jorgensen	1935	1962	
8		Homer D. Babbidge, Jr.	1962	1972	
acting		Edward V. Gant	1969	1969	
acting		Edward V. Gant	1972	1973	
9		Glenn W. Ferguson	1973	1978	
acting		Edward V. Gant	1978	1979	
10		John A. DiBiaggio	1979	1985 (Note: Resigned to lead Michigan State University.)	
11		John T. Casteen III	1985	1990 (Note: Resigned to lead the University of Virginia.)	
acting		Harry J. Hartley	1987	1987	
acting		Harry J. Hartley	August 1990	December 1990	
12		Harry J. Hartley	December 1990	September 30, 1996	
13		Philip E. Austin	October 1, 1996	September 13, 2007	
14		Michael J. Hogan	September 14, 2007	June 10, 2010 (Note: Resigned to lead the University of Illinois system.)	
acting		Philip E. Austin	June 11, 2010	July 14, 2011	
15		Susan Herbst	July 15, 2011	July 31, 2019	
16		Thomas C. Katsouleas	August 1, 2019	June 30, 2021	
acting		Andrew Agwunobi	July 1, 2021	January 31, 2022 (Note: Resigned to lead Humana.)	
interim		Radenka Maric	February 1, 2022	September 28, 2022	
17		Radenka Maric	September 28, 2022	present	

Table notes:
