= Spintria =

Ancient Roman tokens depicting erotic scenes

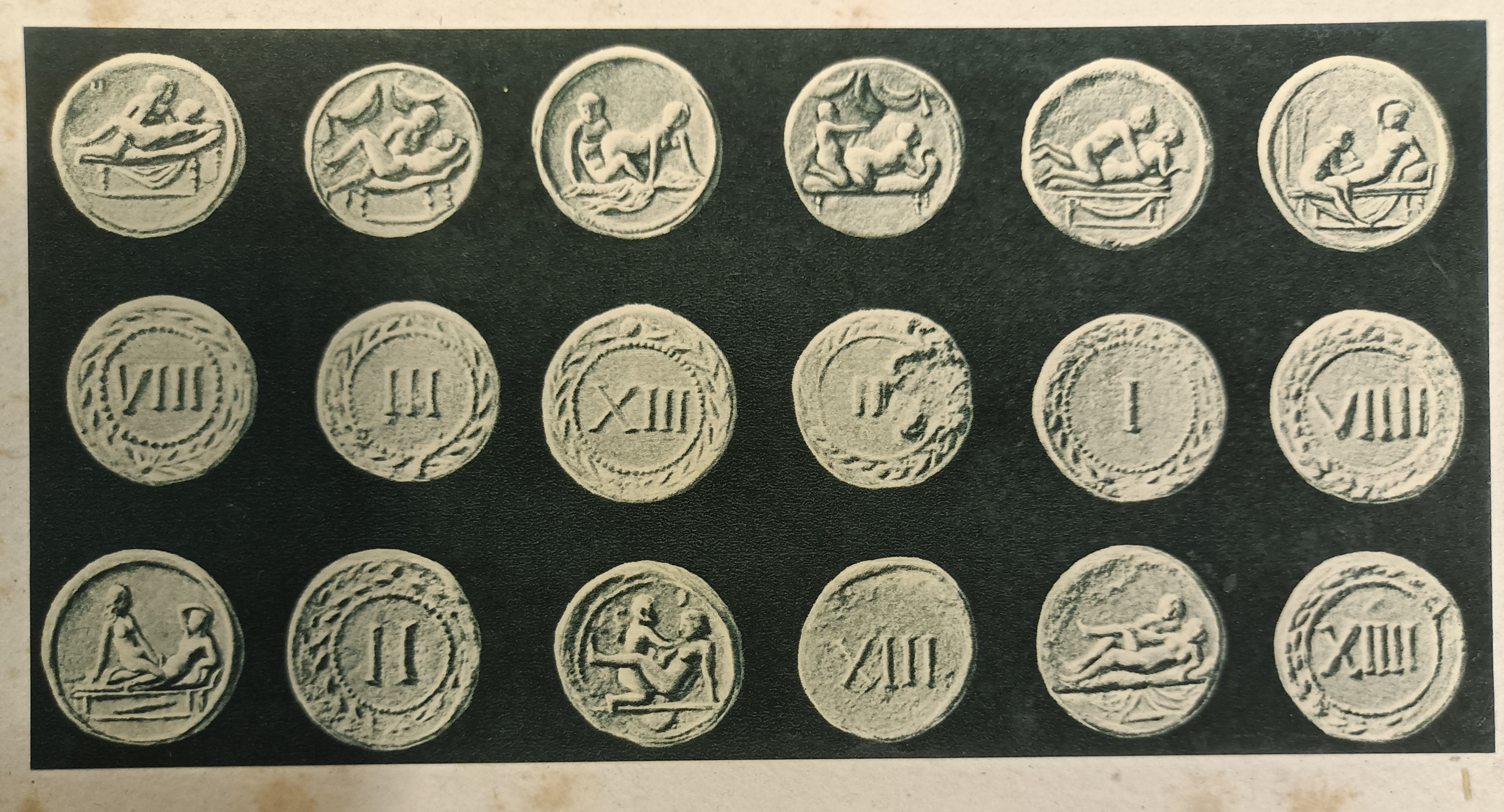
A set of spintria tokens found in Rome, dating from around 22 to 37 CE

A spintria (plural, spintriae) is a small bronze or brass Roman token that typically has a sexual image on one side, and a numeral ranging from I to XVI on the other. They are about 24 mm in diameter. The scenes of couples are typical expressions of sexuality in ancient Rome as found in other explicit art, depicting both female-male and male-male sex acts.

Known spintriae were all produced at a single location. Of the two sets found, the production of the first dates from 22 to 37 CE and the second from 30 to 79 CE. They show no wear from circulation.

Certainty about their use has eluded scholars, who have offered conjectures ranging from brothel passes, "locker room" tokens at the baths, or gaming pieces.

== Name ==
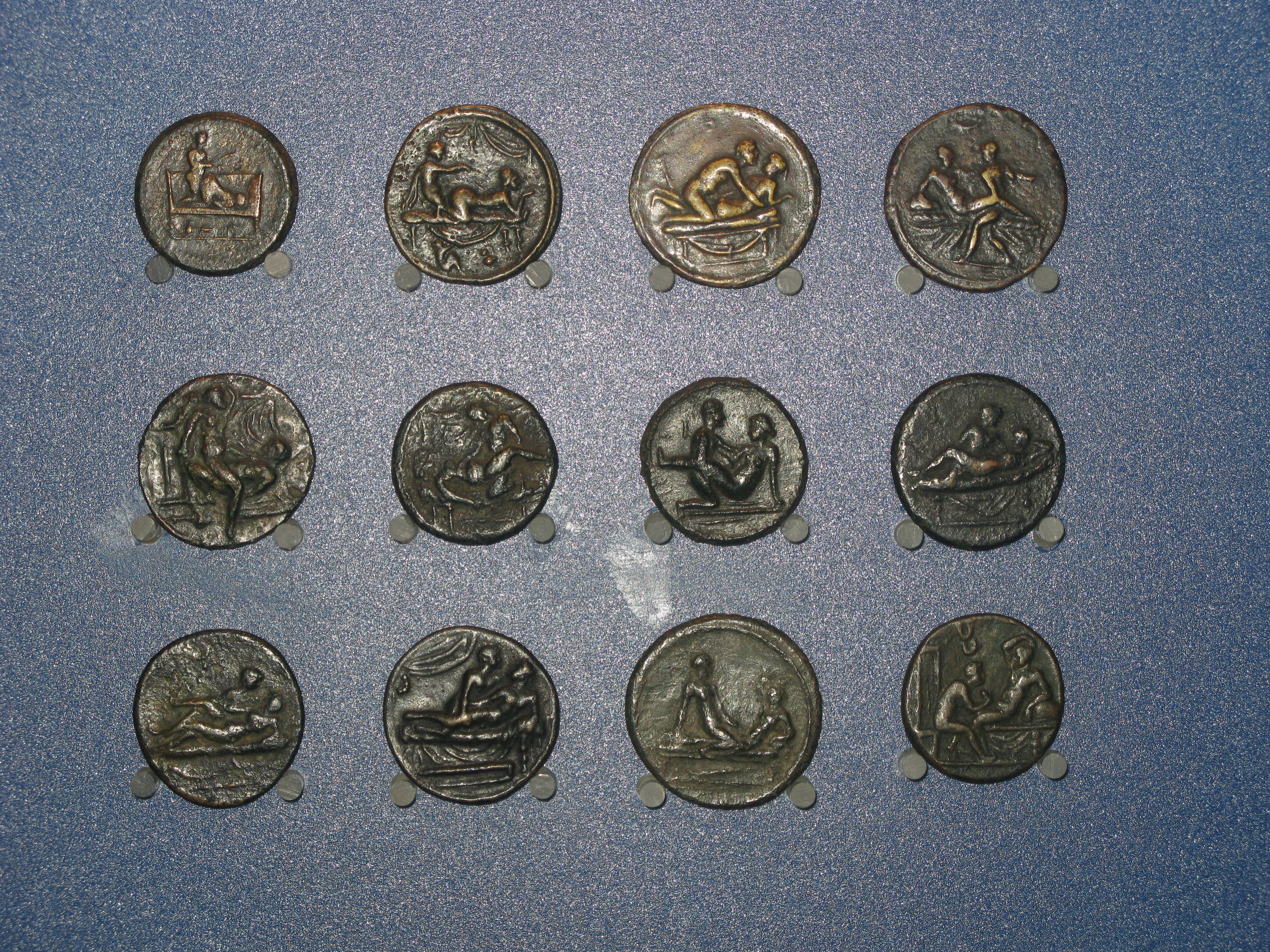
A second set of spintriae (Hunterian Museum and Art Gallery, Glasgow)

According to Bette Talvacchia, the tokens were first called spintriae in the 1559 treatise Sopra le Medaglie Antiche ("Discourse Concerning Ancient Medals") by Sebastiano Errizo, published in Venice. In antiquity, Suetonius had used the word spintria to refer to a young male prostitute offering anal sex, from Greek sphinktḗr (σφιγκτήρ), sphincter. In the 16th century, the name was transferred from the person to the act, and then to the tokens representing the act – or the place where outrageous acts occurred, such as Tiberius' gardens on the isle of Capri.

== Use ==
Some scholars, following Friedlander's (1886) suggestion that the tokens were used to obtain entry to brothels ("auf die man in Bordelle Einlass erhielt"), have argued that spintriae were used to pay prostitutes, although none offer any supporting evidence. Buttrey is dismissive of the brothel token idea, asserting "there is no evidence for any of this". Currently, only Simonetta and Riva are supporters of the brothel token hypothesis, which is also popular with the media; other scholars pursue alternate lines of enquiry (Buttrey; Campana; Duggan; Fishburn; etc.). Under Caracalla, an equestrian was sentenced to death for bringing a coin with the emperor's likeness into a brothel; he was spared only by the emperor's own death. There is no direct ancient evidence, however, to support the theory that spintriae were created as tokens for exchange in place of official coinage.

Spintriae also do not have wearing that is on coins that have been in mass circulation and there are also relatively few compared with the amount of official coins that exist. The spintriae were also all produced at a single location from around 22–37 CE or 30–79 CE and this is a short period of time.

Another idea is that they were used as game pieces for playing a board game and the idea was that the number that appears on the token was relevant to playing the board game. Duggan notes there are no archaeological finds to confirm the spintriae were gaming pieces.

Another idea is that they were used as locker tokens in the dressing room of the suburban baths. On the walls of the suburban baths in Pompeii there are frescos that have been painted with sexual scenes that are the same or similar to the ones on the tokens. On these sexual scenes painted on the frescos there were also "...accompanying numerals, as appear on the reverses" of the tokens. It is speculated that the sexual scenes and numerals on the tokens related to the wall paintings of sexual scenes and numerals. According to this theory, the token would give a person access to a place to put their clothing. Possibly they may have put their clothing inside the box that was sitting on the wooden shelf in the dressing room.

Another idea is that they were possibly an attempt at increasing revenue. This attempt may have been related to the prohibition of carrying coins into brothels that had an image of the emperor on them. After a short amount of time they may have been able to see that if it were to continue it could have adverse effects for brothels or bring them to a standstill, and they ceased being used.

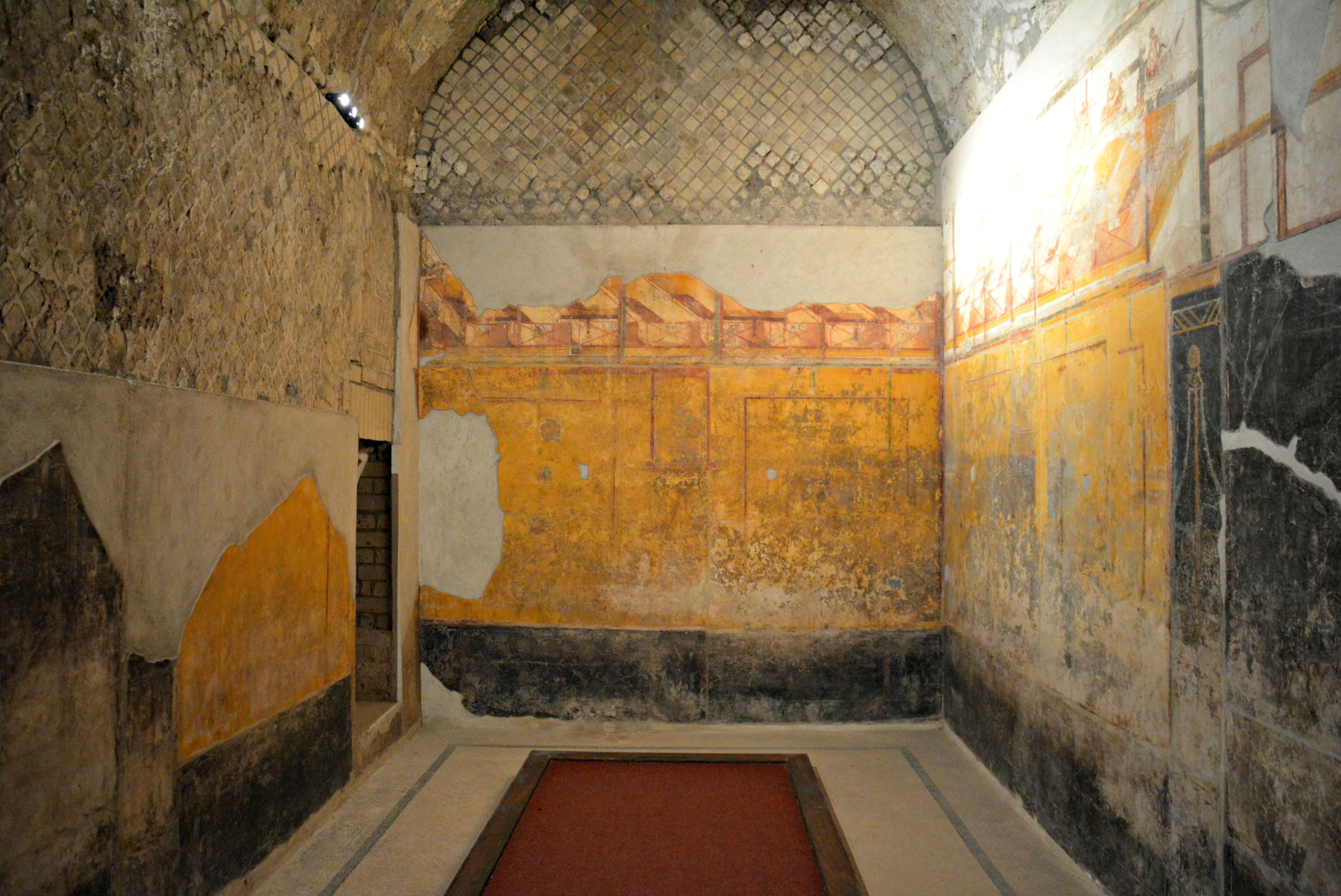
Dressing room in the Suburban Baths at Pompeii, with scenes similar to spintriae

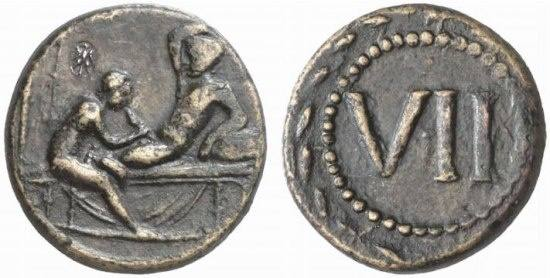
Spintria showing fellatio

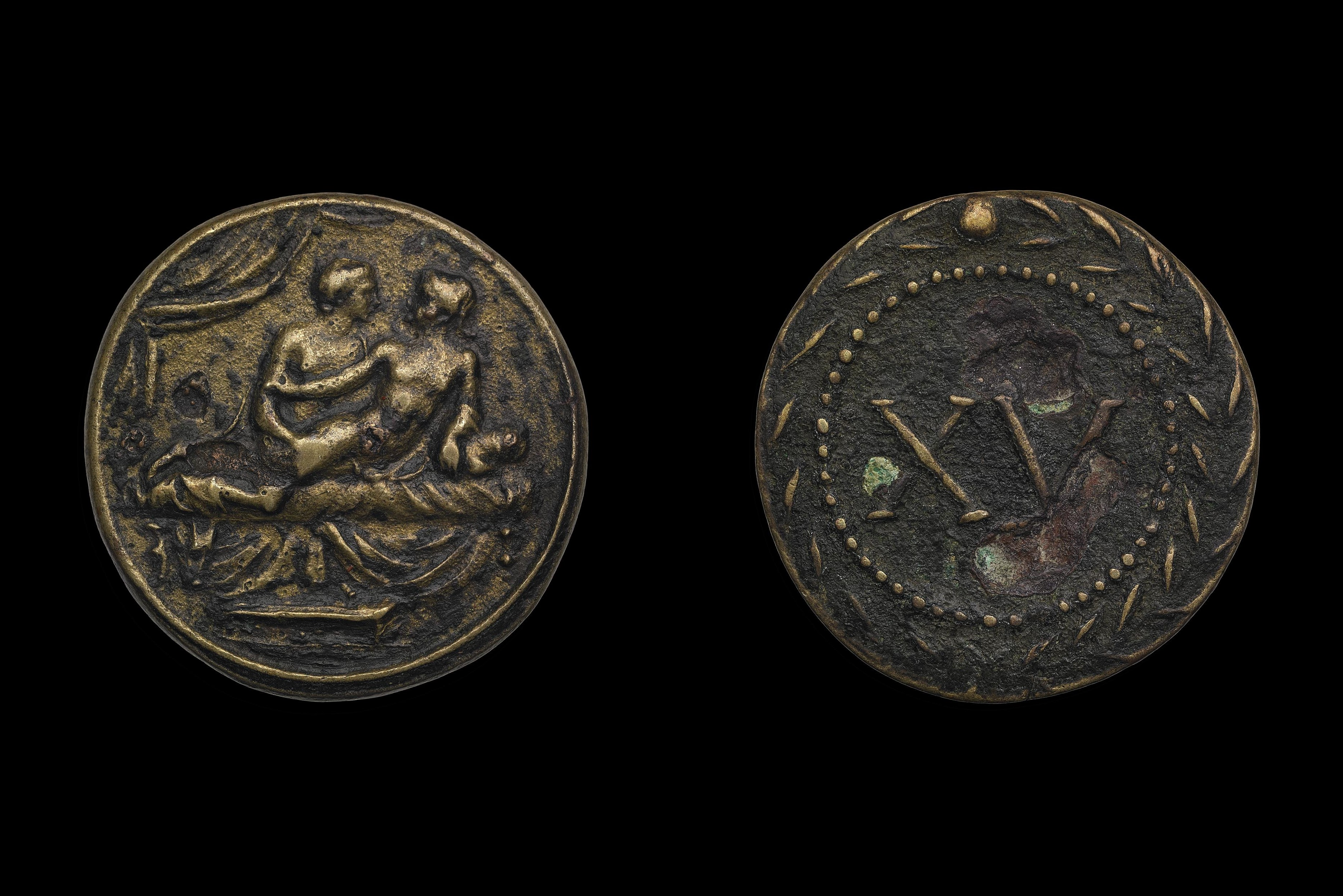
Spintria with sex between two males on a bed, with the numeral XV on the reverse

== Gallery ==
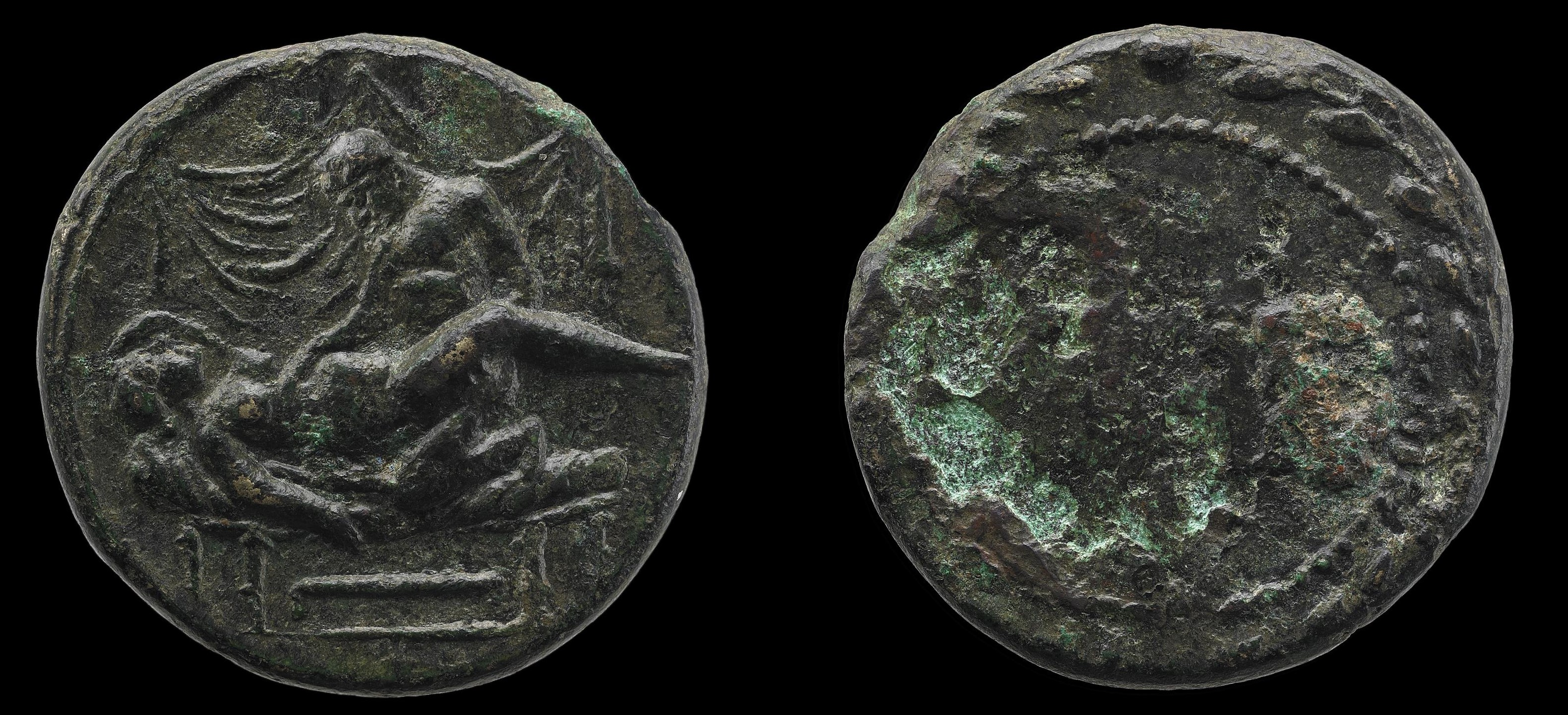
Female-male sex on a bed, likely with a numeral on the corroded reverse

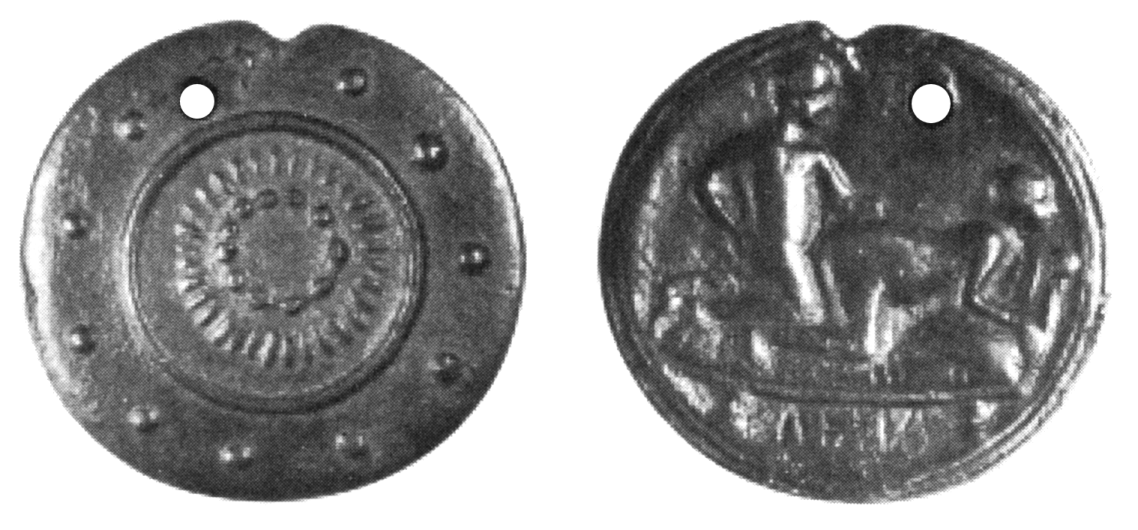
Perforated token (2nd century CE), found in a Celto-Germanic region (Saarland)

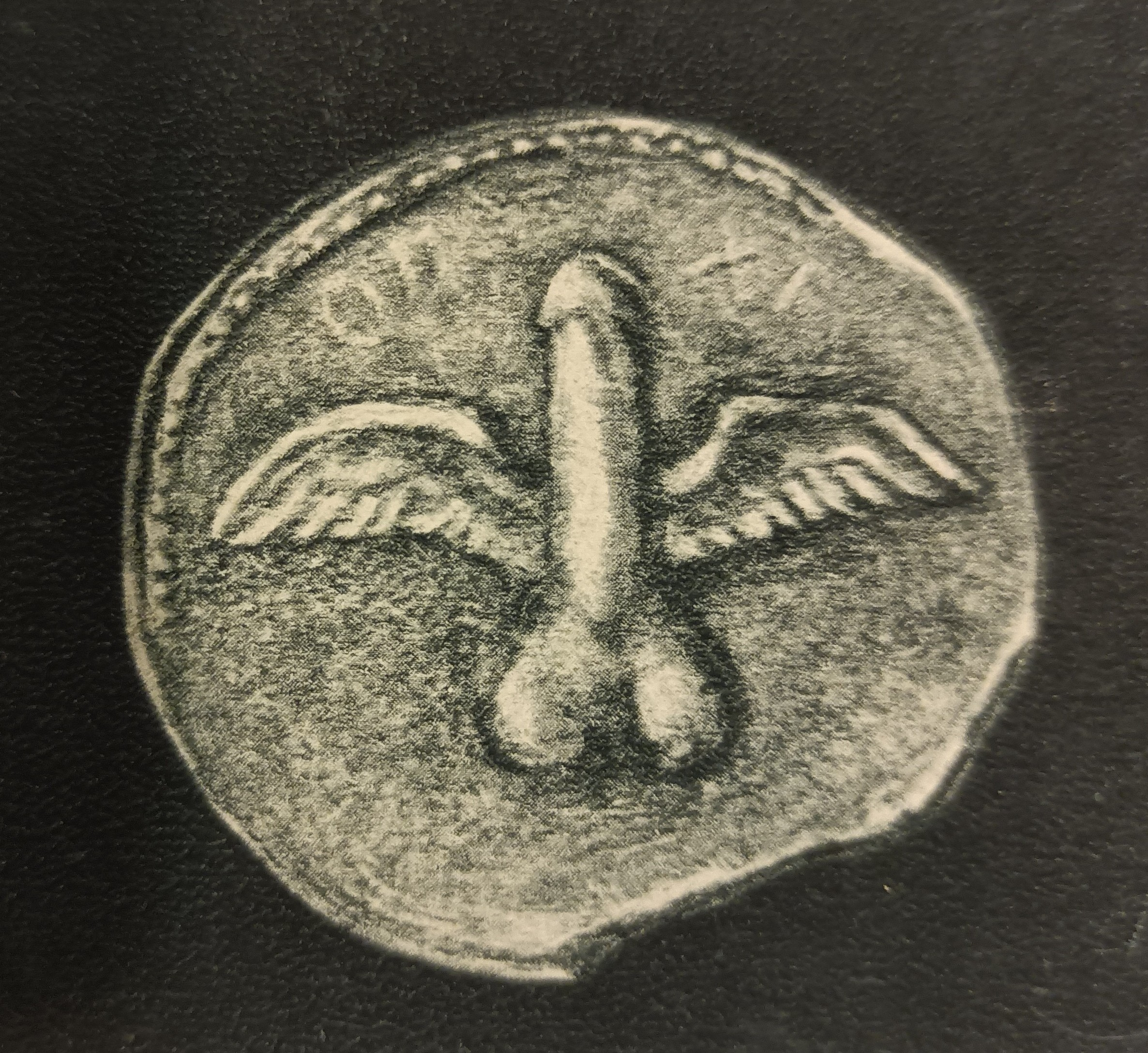
Drawing of a phallic token found in Rome

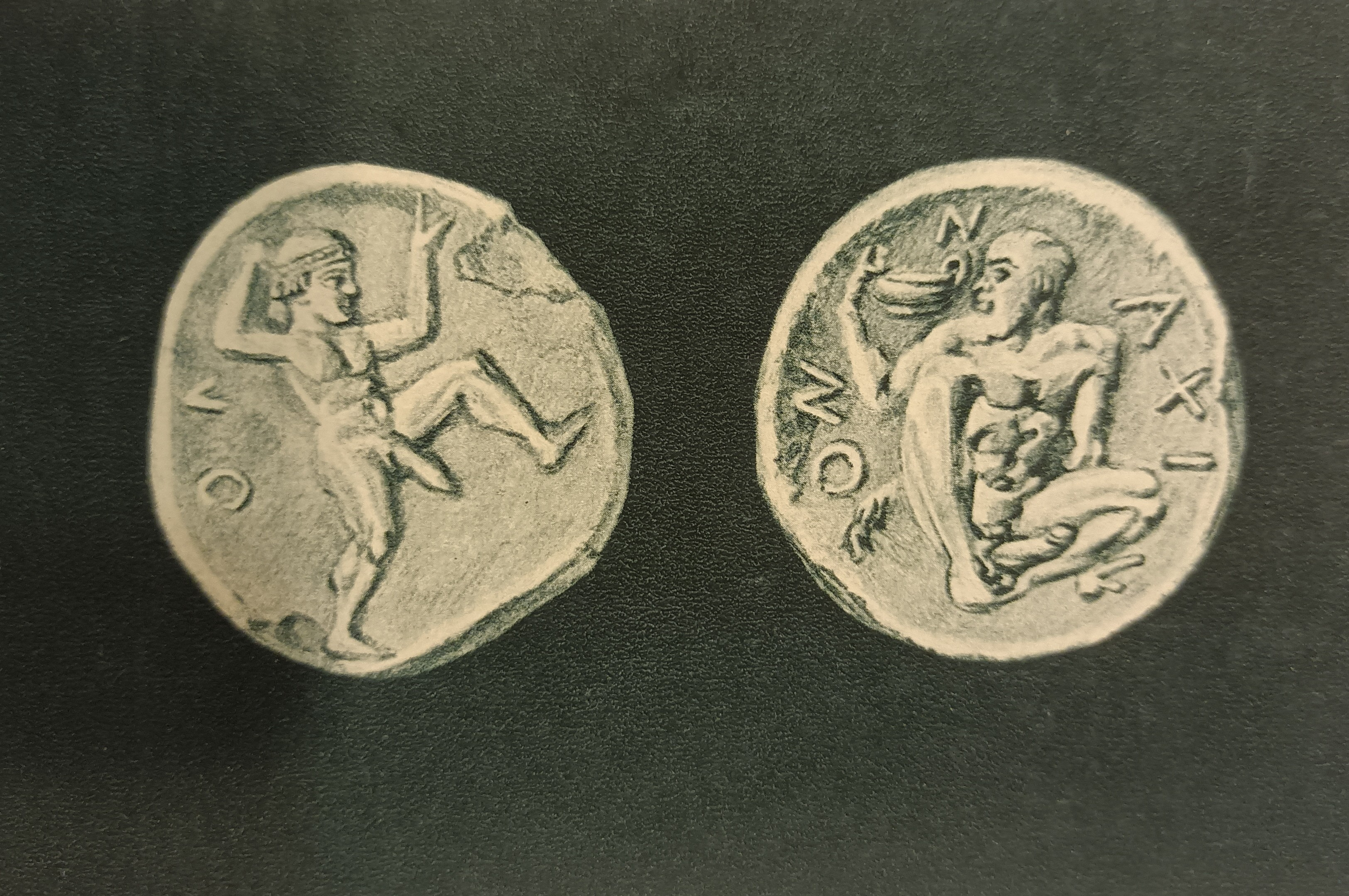
Coins of Naxos from the 6th century BCE, similar to the 1st century spintriae

== See also ==
- Erotic art in Pompeii and Herculaneum
- Homosexuality in ancient Greece
- Homosexuality in ancient Rome
- Pederasty in ancient Greece
- Prostitution in ancient Rome
- Roman currency
- Sexuality in ancient Rome
- Tessera

== Sources ==
- Buttrey, T. V. (1973). "The Spintriae as a Historical Source", The Numismatic Chronicle 13, pp. 52–63.
- Campana, A. (2009). "Le spintriae: tessere Romane con raffigurazione erotiche", La Donna Romana: Immagini E Vita Quotidiana Atti de Convegno. Astina, 7 Marzo 2009. pp. 43–96.
- Duggan, E. (2016). "Stranger Games: The Life and Times of the Spintriae".
- Jacobelli, L. (1995). Le pitture erotiche delle Terme Suburban di Pompeii. L'Erma di Bretschneider. Rome.
- Lee, Bartholomew (Fall 1983). "'Brass Checks' Return: An Excursus in Erotic Numismatics, or The Spintriae Roll Again". The Journal of Popular Culture. 17 (2): 142–145. doi:10.1111/j.0022-3840.1983.1702_142.x.
- Martínez Chico, D. (2018). "Sexo y erotismo en las llamadas spintriae, las supuestas y problemáticas tesserae de lupanar de la Antigua Roma". Athenaeum. Studi di Letteratura e Storia dell'Antichità. 106 (2): 533–557. "PDF" (in Spanish).
- Talvacchia, Bette, 1999, Taking Positions: On the Erotic in Renaissance Culture, Princeton NJ: Princeton University Press.
- Talvacchia, Bette, 1997, "Classical Paradigms and Renaissance Antequarianism in Giulio Romano's 'I Modi'", I Tatti Studies in the Italian Renaissance 7 (1999) pp. 81–188.
