= Boston Bypass =

Boston Bypass could refer to:

- Boston Bypass Independents, a political party in the United Kingdom
- A proposal by Vincent Zarrilli for road infrastructure around Boston
