= George Springer =

American baseball player (born 1989)

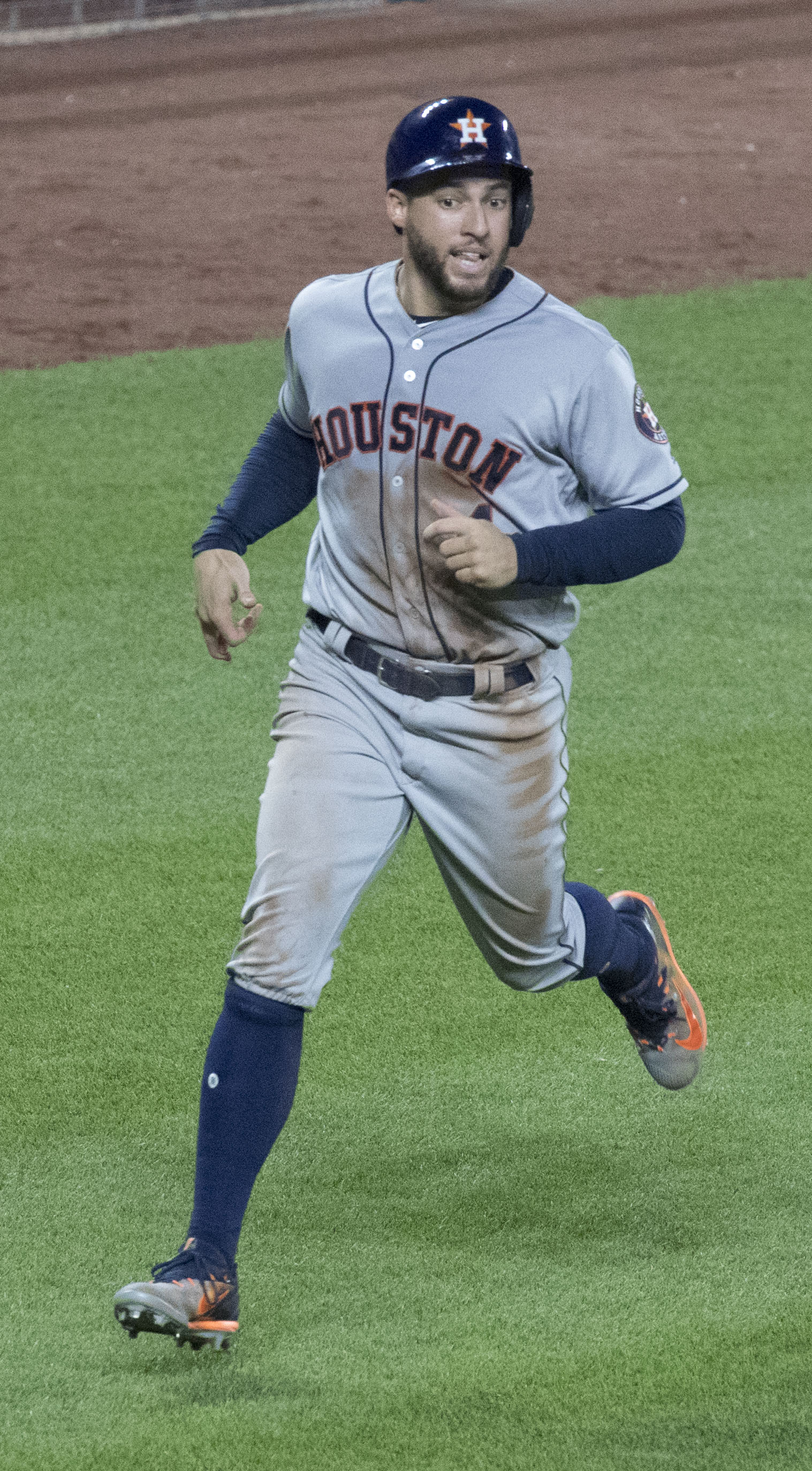
- Springer with the Houston Astros in 2017

Free agent
- Outfielder / Designated hitter
- Born: September 19, 1989 (age 37); New Britain, Connecticut, U.S.
- Bats: Right Throws: Right

MLB debut
- April 16, 2014, for the Houston Astros

MLB statistics (through 2026 season)
- Batting average: .265
- Hits: 1,595
- Home runs: 308
- Runs batted in: 850
- Stats at Baseball Reference

Teams
- Houston Astros (2014–2020); Toronto Blue Jays (2021–2026)

Career highlights and awards
- 4× All-Star (2017–2019, 2022); World Series champion (2017); World Series MVP (2017); 3× Silver Slugger Award (2017, 2019, 2025); MLB records: Most home runs in a single World Series: 5 in 2017 (tied with Chase Utley and Reggie Jackson)

George Chelston Springer III (born September 19, 1989) is an American professional baseball outfielder and designated hitter who is a free agent. He has played in Major League Baseball (MLB) for the Houston Astros and Toronto Blue Jays. Springer has played primarily in right field and also spent significant time in center field.

Springer played college baseball at the University of Connecticut, where he was named Big East Conference Baseball Player of the Year and a First Team All-American. The Astros selected Springer in the first round of the 2011 MLB draft. He made his MLB debut in 2014. In 2017, Springer became an MLB All-Star, Silver Slugger Award winner, and World Series champion. He was also named the 2017 World Series Most Valuable Player (MVP), hitting a record-tying five home runs, as the Astros defeated the Los Angeles Dodgers in seven games. He was again an All-Star in 2018, 2019, and 2022. Springer signed with the Blue Jays as a free agent before the 2021 season.

== Amateur career ==
Springer attended New Britain High School in New Britain, Connecticut, for his freshman year of high school. He played on the varsity baseball team as a freshman despite standing 5 feet 2 inches (1.57 m) and weighing 100 pounds (45 kg). Springer transferred to Avon Old Farms School in Avon, Connecticut, for his sophomore through senior seasons. He repeated his junior year as his grades dropped. Springer played for the Avon Old Farms baseball team. The Minnesota Twins selected Springer in the 48th round of the 2008 MLB draft. Though he considered signing with Minnesota, he decided that he was not ready for professional baseball and did not sign.

Springer enrolled at the University of Connecticut (UConn), where he played college baseball for the Connecticut Huskies baseball team. At UConn, Springer was named to the 2009 Baseball America Freshman All-America First Team. He was also named the Big East Conference rookie of the year. In 2009 and 2010, he played collegiate summer baseball with the Wareham Gatemen of the Cape Cod Baseball League. In 2011, Springer was named the Big East Player of the Year. He was named a first-team All-American by Perfect Game USA, Louisville Slugger. and National Collegiate Baseball Writers Association, while being named a Second Team All-American by Baseball America.

== Professional career ==
=== Minor leagues ===
The Houston Astros selected Springer in the first round, with the 11th overall selection, in the 2011 MLB draft. Springer became the highest selection in the MLB draft in University of Connecticut baseball history. Springer was signed by the Astros, receiving a $2.52 million signing bonus. After he signed, Springer played in eight games with the Tri-City ValleyCats of the Class A-Short Season New York–Penn League. Before the 2012 season, MLB.com rated Springer as the 84th best prospect in baseball.

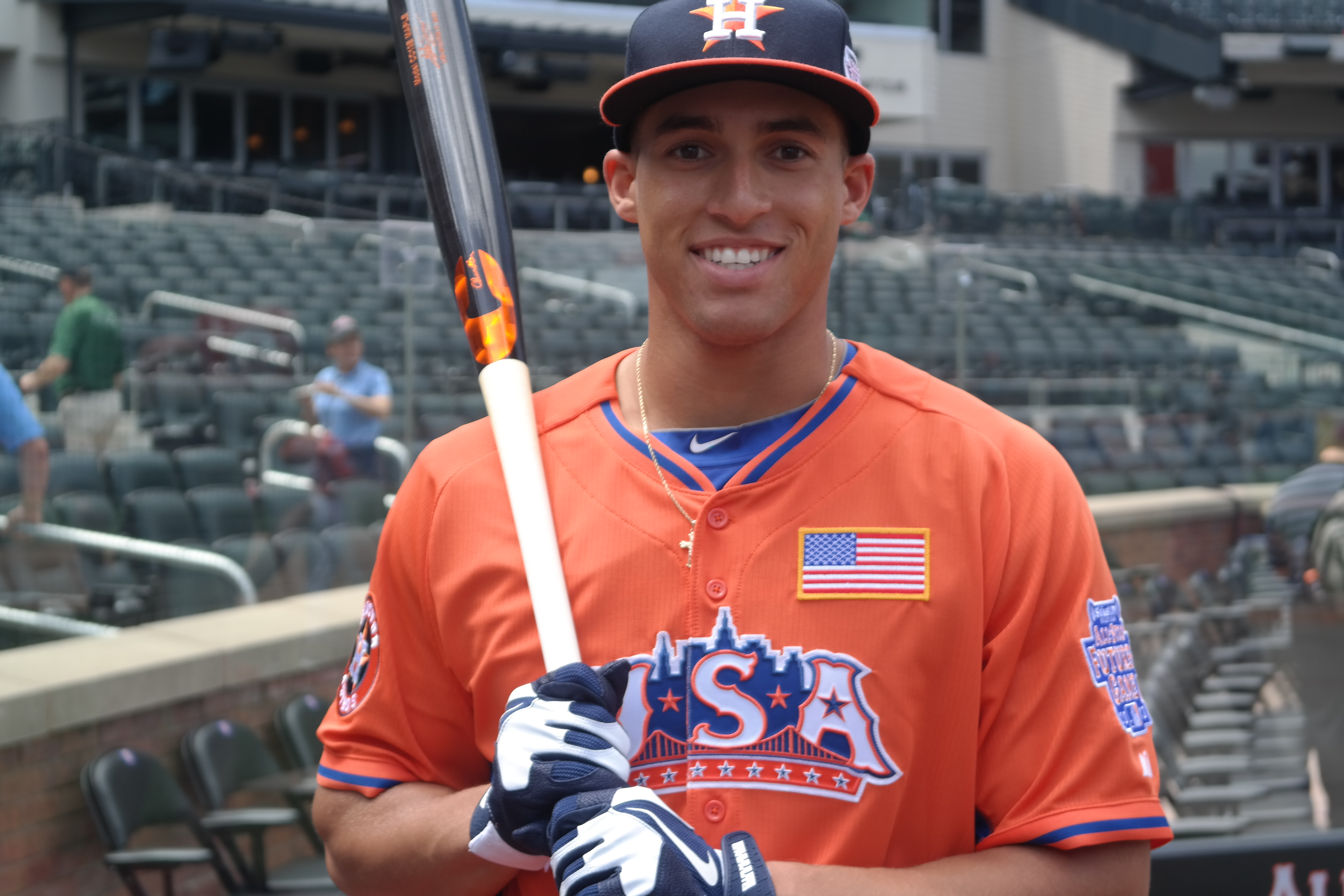
Springer at the 2013 All-Star Futures Game

In 2012, Springer played for the Lancaster JetHawks of the Class A-Advanced California League and the Corpus Christi Hooks of the Class AA Texas League. He hit 22 home runs and recorded 28 stolen bases for Lancaster. Splitting the 2013 season between Corpus Christi and the Oklahoma City RedHawks of the Class AAA Pacific Coast League, Springer joined the 30–30 club, recording more than 30 home runs and stolen bases. He appeared in the Texas League All-Star Game, and was named its most valuable player. He also played in the All-Star Futures Game at Citi Field. Though he only played in 73 games for Corpus Christi, he was named the Texas League Player of the Year at the end of the season. He was a finalist for USA Today's Minor League Player of the Year Award.

Baseball America ranked Springer as the 18th-best prospect in baseball prior to the 2014 season. During spring training in 2014, Springer and his agent rejected a reported seven-year contract worth $23 million, despite having not yet reached the major leagues. Springer started the 2014 season with Oklahoma City. He hit for a .353 batting average and a .647 slugging percentage before being called up to the major league team in time for their April 16 game.

=== Houston Astros (2014–2020) ===
==== 2014–2016 ====
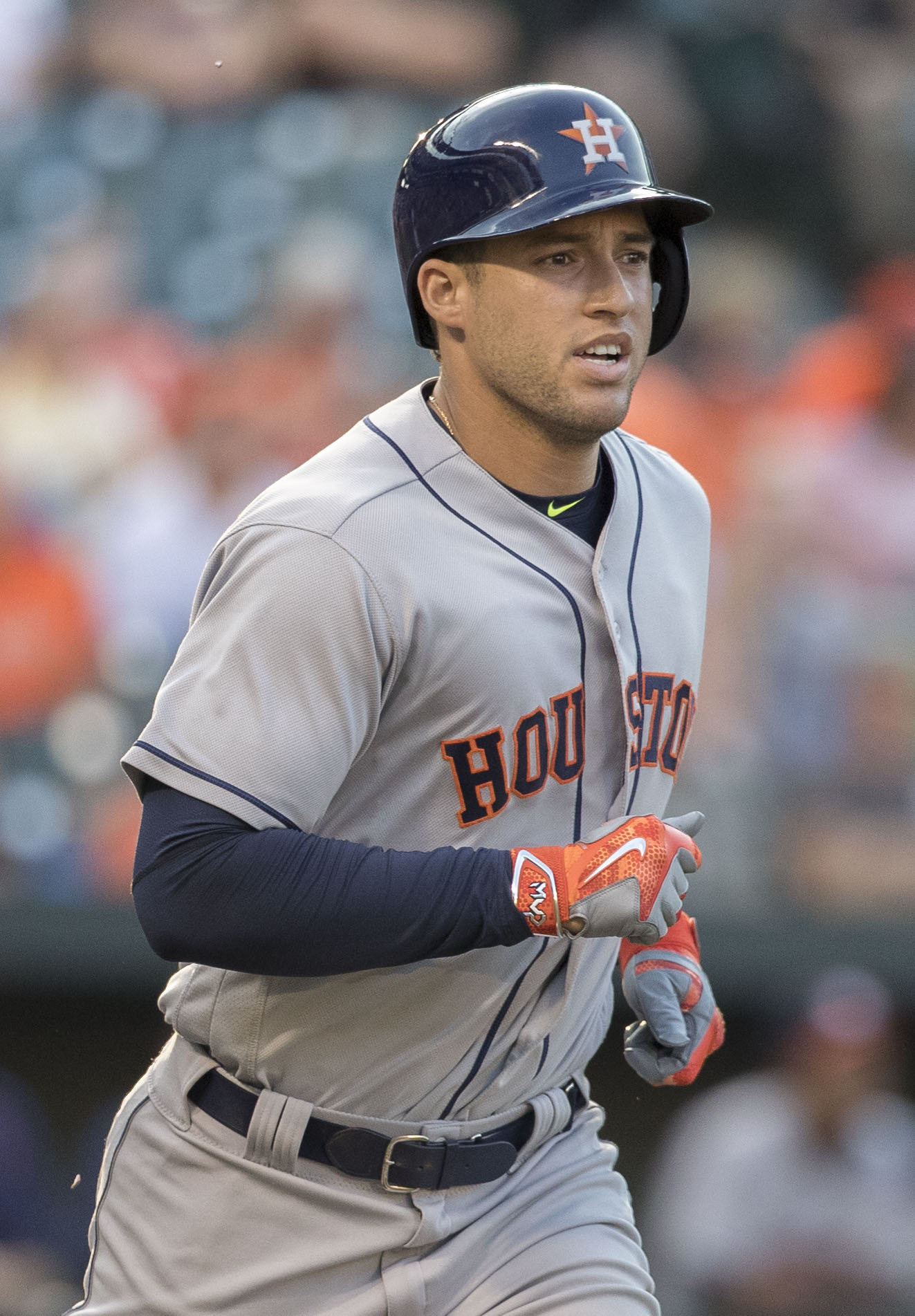
Springer in 2016

Springer made his MLB debut on April 16, 2014, at Minute Maid Park against the Kansas City Royals. Batting second and playing right field, Springer collected his first career hit, an infield single, against Royals pitcher Jeremy Guthrie. Springer hit the first home run of his MLB career on May 8, 2014, at Comerica Park off Detroit Tigers pitcher Drew Smyly. On June 26, Springer hit his 15th home run, becoming the first Astros rookie to reach that mark before the All-Star break. On July 23, 2014, Springer was placed on the 15-day disabled list due to a left quad strain. On September 16, the Astros announced Springer would not play for the remainder of the 2014 season. He played in 78 games in 2014, batting .231 with 20 home runs, 51 runs batted in (RBIs), and 114 strikeouts.

During a game against the Texas Rangers on April 12, 2015, Springer robbed Leonys Martín of a potential game-winning grand slam by making a leaping catch by the wall in the 10th inning at Globe Life Field. The Astros defeated the Texas Rangers, 6–4, in 14 innings. On June 10 versus the Chicago White Sox, Springer attained his first career five-hit game, the first for an Astro since Brandon Barnes on July 19, 2013, who hit for the cycle on that day. Springer, along with Jose Altuve, rookie Carlos Correa, and Dallas Keuchel, became a key figure in that year's Astros playoff run, qualifying for the first time in 10 years. They defeated the New York Yankees in the American League Wild Card Game. In the American League Division Series (ALDS), Houston faced the eventual World Series-champion Royals, who won the series, 3 games to 2. During that series, the Astros took and lost the lead in each of the 5 games.

After consistently cutting down on his strikeout rate from his rookie year, Springer improved the quality of his at bats enough in 2016, that by May, the Astros made him their regular leadoff hitter. He led the American League with 744 plate appearances, playing in all 162 regular season games. He set new career highs with 116 runs scored, 29 home runs, and 88 walks. The Astros finished 84–78, ranking in third place in the AL West and missing the playoffs.

==== 2017 ====
After spending the first three seasons of his career in right field, the Astros shifted Springer to center field in 2017. He was selected as the American League Player of the Week for the first time in June. He also made his first MLB All-Star team played at Marlins Park in Miami, elected by the fans as a starter. Typically the Astros' leadoff hitter, he batted cleanup for the American League lineup, as was the decision of former Astros manager Brad Mills, the AL manager. The Astros took a 60–29 record into the All-Star break, the best 89-game start in franchise history.

On July 28, Springer was placed on the 10-day disabled list due to left quad discomfort. On September 29, prior to a game against the Boston Red Sox at Fenway Park, Springer met and reunited with his first-grade teacher. Springer finished 2017 by playing 140 games with a .283 batting average, 34 home runs, and 85 RBI.

With the Astros finishing the season 101–61, the team clinched the AL West division. The Astros advanced to the World Series to face the Los Angeles Dodgers. Springer struck out four times in Game 1. In Game 2, he, along with two Astros teammates–Carlos Correa and Jose Altuve—and two Dodgers players–Charlie Culberson and Yasiel Puig—all homered in extra innings as the Astros prevailed, 7–6. The five home runs accounted for the most hits in extra innings of any single game in major league history.

In the Astros' 5–1 Game 7 Series-clinching victory, he homered and doubled, finishing with two runs and two RBI. In all, Springer hit five home runs, tying the World Series record shared by Reggie Jackson and Chase Utley. He also homered in each of the final four games, setting a World Series record for consecutive games with a home run. Springer was named the World Series Most Valuable Player (MVP), going 11 for 29 with 7 RBI as the Astros' leadoff hitter. Other World Series records he set were eight extra base hits (five homers and three doubles) and 29 total bases. As a side note, he had appeared on a 2014 cover of Sports Illustrated that predicted the Astros' 2017 World Series win.

After the season, Springer was named an American League Silver Slugger Award winner at outfield for the first time in his career.

Two years later, it was revealed in the Houston Astros sign stealing scandal that the Astros had broken MLB rules during their championship season. Sign-stealing had occurred throughout major league baseball, but the Astros, who had conspired within their organization to steal signs using cameras and other electronic means, were the first known example of such an elaborate and coordinated method of cheating. The team was punished with a $5 million fine and the loss of top draft picks in 2020 and 2021. When asked whether he knew what he and his teammates were doing – illegally using technology to steal opposing catchers' signs – was wrong, Springer claimed that the clubhouse is a sacred place where "what happens in our clubhouse will stay in our clubhouse." Springer later expressed remorse and regret over the sign stealing scandal.

==== 2018–2020 ====
On the Astros' Opening Day at Globe Life Park in Arlington, Springer led off with a home run against Texas Rangers pitcher Cole Hamels, becoming the first MLB player to lead off with a home run in consecutive Opening Days. He had homered off Mariners pitcher Felix Hernandez in the first inning of Opening Day 2017 at Minute Maid Park.

Springer made his second All-Star appearance in as many seasons, joining five other Astros players and manager A. J. Hinch on the American League All-Star team. Springer went back-to-back with teammate Alex Bregman and hit what would be the deciding home run in the top of the 10th inning at Nationals Park to help lead the American League to an 8–6 victory.

On August 5, Springer sprained his left thumb sliding into second base on a stolen base attempt in a game against the Los Angeles Dodgers and was placed on the 10-Day Disabled List. The Astros struggled through August with injuries to Springer, Carlos Correa, and Jose Altuve keeping them out of the lineup. Springer returned to action on August 17 and the Astros held off the charging Oakland A's to win their second straight American League West Division title. Springer finished the season with 22 home runs, 71 RBIs, and batting .265/.346/.434.

Springer started the 2018 postseason off on a strong note, hitting a home run off of Corey Kluber in Game 1 of the 2018 American League Division Series. It was Springer's fifth home run in as many postseason games, tying him with Carlos Beltrán for the club record of consecutive postseason games with a home run. Springer had hit a home run in games 4–7 of the 2017 World Series. Springer then hit two more in Game 3 of the ALDS off of Mike Clevinger and Cody Allen respectively, leading the Astros to an 11–3 victory and a series sweep of the Cleveland Indians. With his home runs in Game 3, Springer became the all-time Astros leader in postseason home runs with 10, again passing Beltrán's 8 from 2004.

On March 28, 2019, Springer tied with Khris Davis of the Oakland Athletics for consecutive Opening Day home runs with three, when he hit a 427-foot (130 m) home run to center field off of reigning Cy Young award winner Blake Snell. On May 1, Major League Baseball disciplined Springer for an anti-gay slur directed at umpire Ángel Hernández, which was caught on camera during a game on April 23. On May 25, Springer was placed on the 10-day IL with a Grade 2 left hamstring strain.

Carrying a .316 batting average, 1.046 OPS, and 18 home runs through June 28, Springer was named a starting outfielder for American League in the All-Star Game.

In 2019, Springer batted .292/.383/.591 with 39 home runs (fifth in the AL) and 96 RBI in 479 at bats over 122 games. His adjusted OPS+ was 150, ranking fourth. He placed in the top ten in the league in several categories for the first time. Those included wins above replacement (WAR, 6.4–10th), OBP (eighth), slugging percentage (fourth), OPS (fourth), offensive win percentage (.713, fourth), and at bats per home run (12.3, fourth). On defense, he was second among all outfielders in total zone runs (19), second among center fielders (eight), and third among right fielders (10).

In 2020, Springer batted .265/.359/.540 with 37 runs, 14 home runs (7th in the AL), 32 RBIs, and hit by pitch five times (tied for eighth in the AL) in 189 at bats.

=== Toronto Blue Jays (2021–2026) ===
==== 2021–2022 ====
On January 23, 2021, Springer signed a six-year, $150 million contract with the Toronto Blue Jays. He injured his quadriceps in spring training, however, and missed the start of the season. He finally made his debut in the team's 23rd game of the season on April 28. Springer was again placed on the injured list on May 5 with a quad strain. While on the injured list, Springer made his first return to Houston as a Blue Jay in an early-May series, and received a standing ovation. Springer returned to Toronto's lineup on June 22.

On August 2, Springer was named AL Player of the Week batting .400 with eight runs scored, five doubles, three home runs, seven RBI, six walks, and a .960 slugging percentage over seven games played. On August 9, for the second week in a row, he was named AL Player of the Week after batting .364 with nine runs scored, three doubles, a triple, three home runs, 11 RBI, and a .788 slugging percentage in eight games. Springer suffered a left ankle sprain on August 14 and was placed on the injured list for a third time in 2021. He returned from his third stint on the injured list on August 30.

In 2022, Springer received his fourth All-Star selection and helped lead the Blue Jays to a Wild Card berth. Springer, along with Matt Chapman, got two hits during the first game of the 2022 American League Wild Card Series against the Seattle Mariners. During the eighth inning of the second game, J. P. Crawford hit a ball into the middle of center field. Springer, while trying to catch the ball, collided heavily with Bo Bichette, allowing Crawford to get an RBI double. Springer's injury resulted in him having to be carted off the field. The Mariners completed a two-game series sweep, ending the Blue Jays' season.

==== 2023–present ====
On June 25, 2023, Springer hit his 55th career leadoff home run, moving him into second place on the all-time list in leadoff home runs. On September 24, 2023, Springer hit an inside-the-park home run in a road game against the Tampa Bay Rays. In 2023, Springer batted .258/.327/.405 with 21 home runs and 72 RBIs.

Springer struggled to start the 2024 season. In mid-May, he was dropped out of the leadoff spot in favor of Davis Schneider, down to sixth or seventh in the order. He finished with a career-low batting .220/.303/.371 with 19 home runs and 56 RBIs.

In late June and early July 2025, Springer helped lead the Blue Jays in a four-game sweep of the New York Yankees. He hit four home runs and drove in 11 RBIs during the series, including two home runs on July 1 that secured a Canada Day victory for Toronto. After a sweep of the Los Angeles Angels that same week, he was named MLB's AL player of the week.

He has been playing as the team's designated hitter for much of the season but, per his request, the clubhouse lineup card has him listed as "OP". It stands for "Offensive Player", because he insists that his role includes aspects other than hitting, such as running.

On September 19, Springer hit his 30th home run of the season with a leadoff homer in the first inning against the Kansas City Royals on his 36th birthday. For the first time since 2019, he hit 30 homers in a season.

On October 12, 2025, in Game 1 of the American League Championship Series, Springer hit a leadoff home run off Mariners starter Bryce Miller on the very first pitch to give the Blue Jays a 1–0 lead. His home run was the only run of the game for the Blue Jays and led until the top of the sixth when Cal Raleigh hit a game-tying home run.

On October 20, 2025, in Game 7 of the American League Championship Series, Springer put the Blue Jays ahead with a three-run home run off of a pitch from Eduard Bazardo, giving the Blue Jays a 4–3 lead in the seventh inning, and sending Toronto to the World Series for the first time since 1993. The Blue Jays lost to the defending champion Los Angeles Dodgers in seven games.

On June 29, 2026, Springer scored a career-first leadoff Little League home run off a line drive bouncing past Juan Soto in left field and bobbled by A.J. Ewing, scored a triple followed by an error, to open a 2–1 victory over the New York Mets.

== Personal life ==
Springer's grandfather, George, emigrated from Panama at age 17 and pitched for four years at Teachers College of Connecticut, now known as Central Connecticut State University. His Panamanian-born grandfather was of Saint Lucian and Barbadian descent.

Springer's father, George Jr., competed in the 1976 Little League World Series and played college football for the UConn Huskies. Springer's mother, Laura, from Utuado, Puerto Rico, competed as a top-level gymnast. George Jr. started his own law firm. He and his wife, Laura, are very active in volunteering for Little League Baseball, and were named Little League Parents of the Year in 2016. George Jr. and Laura have three children: George III, Nicole and Lena. Both Nicole and Lena played softball in college.

As a child, Springer attended New Britain Rock Cats games. His favorite baseball player was Torii Hunter, with whom he played catch at eight years old. He also grew up a die-hard Boston Red Sox fan.

"It took a lot of courage. This didn’t happen overnight. It was hard work, most of which, quite frankly, George did. We were there to guide, assist, coach, and support, but he was the one who had to be comfortable in his own skin. He was the one that had to adopt all the techniques. I give him all the credit."

— Springer's father, George Springer Jr., on overcoming his stutter

Springer is an avid ice hockey fan. Growing up, Springer was a big fan of the hometown Hartford Whalers of the National Hockey League (NHL). He grew up 15 minutes from the Whalers' arena, the Hartford Civic Center, and would often attend games with his dad. When Springer was seven years old, the small-market Whalers relocated to Raleigh to become the Carolina Hurricanes, and while Springer's loyalties did not follow the team to Carolina, he still subscribes to an annual streaming package to watch NHL games. He remains a publicly loyal Whalers fan to this day, sporting Whalers gear on occasion and during the 2023 MLB season, made plans to use Brass Bonanza, the former theme song of the Whalers, as his MLB walk-up song. In September 2025, Springer's Hartford Whaler-themed batting gloves were sent to the Hockey Hall of Fame.

Springer has a stutter. He said that it was only after his promotion to the major leagues that he began to accept himself and develop new techniques to help him talk. He began to perform charity work as a spokesperson for the Stuttering Association for the Young (SAY) while in Houston, which included hosting an annual bowling benefit among other things. He has continued his work for SAY north of the border since joining the Blue Jays. Springer has participated in a baseball clinic hosted by Matt Barnes at the Newtown, Connecticut, Youth Academy for elementary school students in the aftermath of the Sandy Hook Elementary School shooting. Writer Jesse Sanchez wrote an article for MLB.com about Springer helping Sanchez's son, Mateo Sanchez, with the boy's own stutter.

“I wished that there was someone when I was a kid who could make stuttering cool. Then one day, when I wasn’t a kid anymore, I saw this really amazing person on television. He was cool, he was a great athlete and he stuttered just like me, just like the hundreds and thousands of friends I have who stutter. He owned it. He didn’t shy away from saying what he wanted to say. He was just himself. He did what I had never seen anyone do before him. He made stuttering cool.”

— Taro Alexander, founder of Stuttering Association for the Young, on George Springer.

On January 20, 2018, Springer married Charlise Castro, who played softball for the Albany Great Danes at the University at Albany. They have three children. A son, George Chelston Springer IV, was born in February 2021. Their second child was born in July 2023. A baby boy was born July 2026.

On April 23, 2019, Springer used a homophobic slur against the game's umpire, Ángel Hernández, during a seven-game homestand that included a three-game set against the Minnesota Twins.

In March 2020, Springer donated $100,000 to Minute Maid Park employees during the COVID-19 pandemic.

Springer is left handed; playing baseball and golf are the only things he does right handed. He first picked up a baseball as a young child with his right hand, and stuck with it.

== See also ==
- Houston Astros award winners and league leaders
- List of Houston Astros team records
- List of Major League Baseball career home run leaders
- List of Major League Baseball single-game hits leaders
- List of Major League Baseball career runs scored leaders
- List of University of Connecticut people

Awards and achievements
Preceded by Jose Altuve	Hickok Belt monthly award November 2017	Succeeded by James Harden
