= Estelle Feinstein =

American historian (1923–2002)

- Born: Estelle Florence Fisher; December 31, 1923; New York City, US
- Died: November 3, 2002 (aged 78); Stamford, Connecticut, US
- Occupation: Historian

Academic background
- Education: Vanderbilt University (BA); University of Wisconsin (MA); Columbia University (PhD)
- Doctoral advisor: John A. Garraty

Academic work
- Discipline: Historian
- Sub-discipline: History of Connecticut
- Institutions: University of Connecticut

Estelle Florence Feinstein (December 31, 1923 – November 3, 2002) was an American historian specializing in the history of Stamford, Connecticut. The author of three books on the city's history, Feinstein taught at the University of Connecticut's Stamford campus from 1957 to 1989. She received a Homer D. Babbidge Jr. Lifetime Recognition Award from the Association for the Study of Connecticut History in 1999.

== Biography ==
Feinstein was born Estelle Florence Fisher in New York City on December 31, 1923, a daughter of Moses and Libby Kaleko Fisher. She received her bachelor's degree from Vanderbilt University in 1944, her Master of Arts in history from the University of Wisconsin in 1946, and her PhD in history from Columbia University in 1971. John A. Garraty supervised her dissertation, which focused on Stamford during the Gilded Age. She taught at Brooklyn College starting in 1946, spent two years in Paris in 1949–51, and moved to Stamford in 1956.

After a stint teaching at the UConn Hartford campus, Feinstein received a lectureship appointment at the UConn Stamford campus in 1957. She continued to teach at Stamford until retiring in 1989, rising to full Professor of History by 1981. She continued to teach while raising three children and commuting to earn her PhD.

Feinstein married commercial artist Malcolm Feinstein (1922–2014) in 1949. She died of Parkinson's disease at Stamford Hospital on November 3, 2002, at the age of 78. She was survived by her husband and their three children: Daniel Feinstein, Deborah Feinstein, and Susan Barry.

== Legacy ==
The University of Connecticut's Jeremy Richard Library in Stamford has a study area dedicated to Feinstein's memory. A portrait and commemorative plaque are mounted nearby. Featuring a wide range of topics in US and world history, the Estelle Feinstein Memorial Lectures have taken place at UConn Stamford on an annual basis since 2004. Speakers have included Eric Foner, Susan Zuccotti, Kenneth T. Jackson, Karen Ordahl Kupperman, and Nechama Tec. The lecture series is co-sponsored by the Jewish Historical Society of Fairfield County, the Stamford Historical Society, and UConn Stamford.

== Published books ==
- Feinstein, Estelle F. (1971). Stamford, Connecticut, 1868–1893: A Study of Small Town Politics in the Gilded Age (PhD thesis). Columbia University. OCLC 6586299.
- Feinstein, Estelle F. (1973). Stamford in the Gilded Age: The Political Life of a Connecticut Town, 1868–1893. Stamford, Conn.: Stamford Historical Society. OCLC 733311.
- Feinstein, Estelle F. (1976). Stamford from Puritan to Patriot: The Shaping of a Connecticut Community, 1641–1774. Stamford, Conn.: Stamford Bicentennial Corporation. OCLC 3001745.
- Feinstein, Estelle F.; Pendery, Joyce S.; Updegraff, Marie (1984). Stamford: An Illustrated History. Woodland Hills, Calif.: Windsor Publications; Stamford Historical Society. ISBN 978-0-89781-114-9. OCLC 11114636. Reissued in 2002 by American Historical Press.
