= Horatio Strother =

American historian

Horatio Theodore Strother
- Strother circa 1962
- Born: February 1, 1930; New York City, US
- Died: September 14, 1974 (aged 44); Haddam, Connecticut, US
- Occupations: Historian, educator

Academic background
- Education: University of Connecticut (BA, MA)
- Thesis: The Underground Railroad in Connecticut from 1830-1850 (1957)
- Academic advisor: Albert E. Van Dusen

Academic work
- Discipline: American history
- Sub-discipline: African American history
- Institutions: University of New Haven
- Notable works: The Underground Railroad in Connecticut (Wesleyan University Press, 1962)

Horatio Theodore Strother (February 1, 1930 – September 14, 1974) was an American historian and educator who wrote an influential 1962 book on the Underground Railroad in Connecticut. His teaching career culminated in a professorship at the University of New Haven from the 1960s.

== Early life ==
Strother was born on February 1, 1930, in Harlem to Helen and Theodore Strother. The family was African American. They moved to Middletown, Connecticut, soon after his birth. After moving with his father back to New York City a year later, Strother returned to Middletown in 1943, where he attended Woodrow Wilson High School and participated in football and track and field. A track star, he achieved second place in a statewide running broad jump competition. Strother enlisted in the US Air Force on December 8, 1950, and served four years on active duty in the Korean War.

== Education ==
Strother earned his Bachelor of Arts (1956) and Master of Arts (1957) degrees in history from the University of Connecticut. His thesis, studying the Underground Railroad in Connecticut, was supervised by Albert E. Van Dusen. He was a member of the Phi Alpha Theta history honors society.

== Career ==
After a short stint teaching at Killingworth Elementary School, Strother taught history at the Nathan Hale-Ray High School in Moodus starting in 1959. He quickly became head of the social studies department. He also taught history at South Central Community College in New Haven. By 1963 he was teaching part-time at the University of New Haven, where he received a promotion to assistant professor of history by 1966.

After years of research, Stother published a rewrite of his thesis. He drew on manuscripts and published sources, notably the work of Wilbur Henry Siebert, while also conducting oral history interviews with descendants of Underground Railroad agents and passengers. The Underground Railroad in Connecticut was published by Wesleyan University Press in 1962. Critics tempered praise of Strother's unique take on a long-neglected topic with criticism of his reliance on reminiscences. The book's reputation has grown since its publication—reissued in 2012, it is still in print and is held by more than 1370 libraries worldwide. Strother's book continues to be "regarded as the definitive text on the Underground Railroad in Connecticut."

== Personal life ==
Strother married Joanne Horner in June 1951. The couple lived in Higganum and had five children, one of whom died in infancy in 1961.

Strother drowned on September 14, 1974, while swimming in Hidden Lake near his home. He was survived by his wife and four children.
