= John A. Garraty =

American historian and biographer

John Arthur Garraty
- Born: July 4, 1920; Brooklyn, New York, United States
- Died: December 19, 2007 (aged 87); Sag Harbor, New York, United States
- Education: Brooklyn College, Columbia University
- Known for: Biographical History
- Scientific career
- Fields: Historian
- Workplaces: Columbia University

John Arthur Garraty (July 4, 1920 – December 19, 2007) was an American historian and biographer. He specialized largely in American political and economic history.

Garraty earned an undergraduate degree at Brooklyn College in 1941 and completed his doctorate at Columbia University in 1948. During World War II, he served in the United States Merchant Marine as a swimming instructor. His 1953 biography, Henry Cabot Lodge (Knopf, 1953), was the first scholarly and authoritative life of the Massachusetts politician Henry Cabot Lodge (1850–1924); a notable feature of that book was the set of footnotes written at Garraty's invitation by Lodge's grandson, Ambassador Henry Cabot Lodge Jr. (1902–1985), expressing disagreement with some of Garraty's interpretations and findings. He taught at Michigan State University for 12 years before joining the Columbia University History Department in 1959. Garraty also served as the president of the Society of American Historians. He retired from teaching at Columbia in 1990.

An author of many textbooks, Garraty's works include the college and high school history textbook The American Nation, later editions of which were co-written with Mark C. Carnes. Among Garraty's other works were many biographies, and a study of the craft of biography, The Art of Biography (Knopf, 1960). In the 1970s and 1960 Garraty was a historical consultant on various film and media projects, most prominently the School House Rock children's television shorts. Garraty co-edited The Columbia History of the World (1972) and was one of the general editors of the American National Biography, a project which he completed in his retirement.

== Bibliography ==
- online editions of 53 books written or edited by Garraty
