= Sidney Waxman =

American horticulturist and educator (1923–2005)

- Born: November 13, 1923; Providence, Rhode Island
- Died: February 10, 2005 (aged 81); Storrs, Connecticut
- Education: University of Rhode Island; Cornell University
- Known for: Witch's broom cultivars
- Scientific career
- Fields: Horticulture
- Workplaces: University of Connecticut

Sidney Waxman (1923–2005) was an American botanist and horticulturist who served as Professor of Ornamental Horticulture at the University of Connecticut's main campus in Storrs for more than thirty years (1957-1991), continuing to work on his ornamentals long after retirement. His research interests included plant photoperiodism, tissue culture, and witches’ brooms. He founded UConn's experimental plant nursery and built a national reputation for cultivation of dwarf conifers from witch's brooms, developing and naming thirty-four distinct cultivars. He also cultivated Japanese umbrella pines, larches, cinnamon bark maple, hemlocks, and azaleas. Waxman raised more than 200,000 seedlings to create a total of forty cultivars. Many of his varieties were sold in plant nurseries and garden centers.

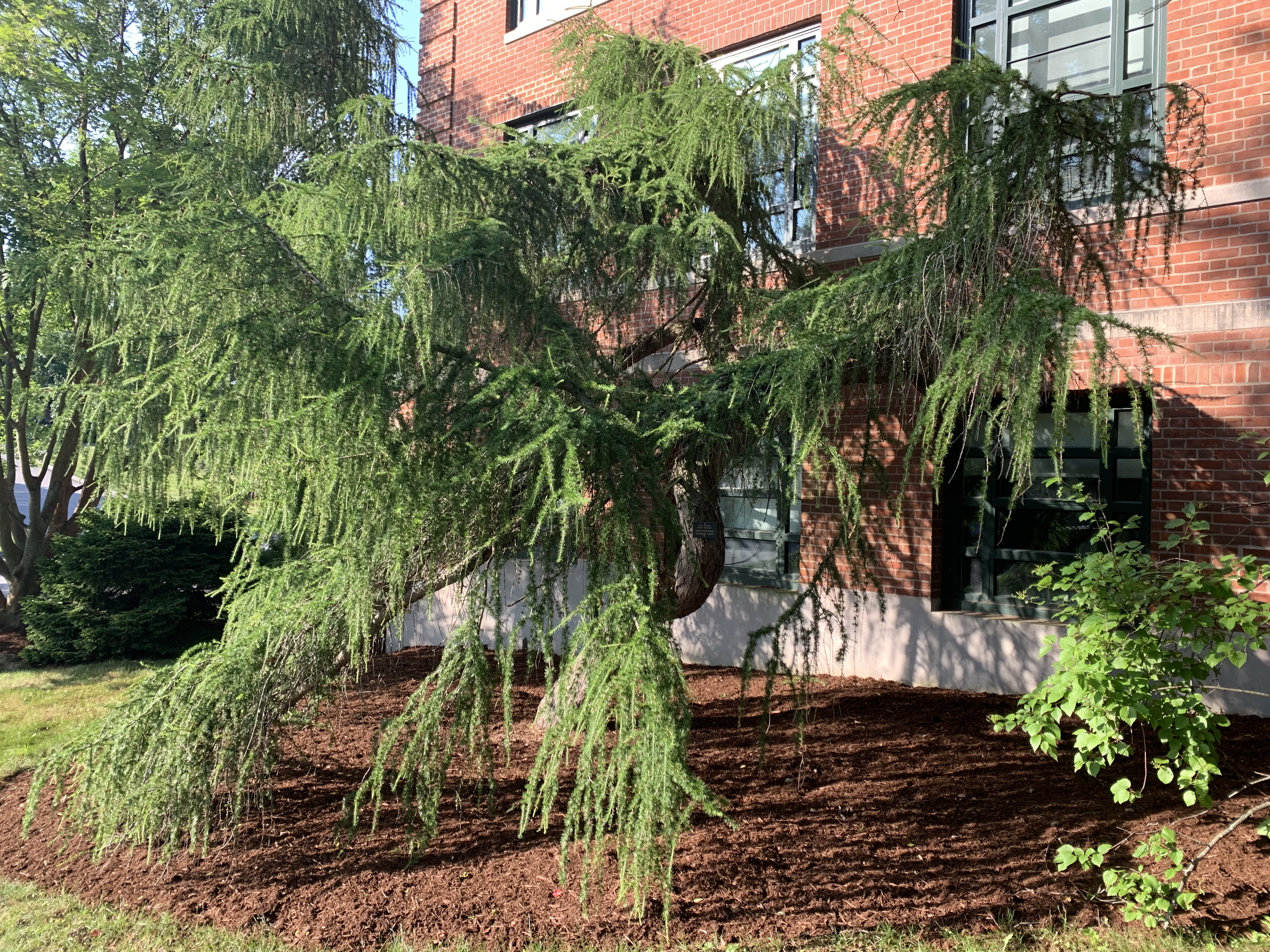
"Varied Directions" European Larch (Larix decidua) dwarf conifer cultivated by Sidney Waxman

Born in Providence in 1923, Waxman worked as a pipefitter at a shipyard in New London, Connecticut, before enlisting in the U.S. Navy and serving as an aircraft mechanic during World War II. He married Florence Dix in 1948 and pursued higher education through the G.I. Bill. At first planning to study mechanical engineering, Waxman earned a bachelor's degree in horticulture from the University of Rhode Island and a master's and doctorate, both in horticulture, at Cornell University. His early research focused on the effects of different periods of exposure to light on plant growth. He was appointed a professor of ornamental horticulture at UConn in 1957. He was renowned for using seeds from witches' brooms to propagate dwarf conifers with radically varied characteristics. On his drives around New England, he sometimes used a .22 caliber rifle to shoot down seed-bearing cones, though in later years he employed professional tree climbers to retrieve the cones.

In 2004, the New York Botanical Garden dedicated the Sidney Waxman Plant Collection, which contains nearly all of Waxman's evergreens. The Bartlett Arboretum and Gardens holds a small collection of witch's broom donated by Waxman in the early 1980s. Specimens of his dwarf pine varieties are planted all over the Storrs campus, and a garden planted beside the W.B. Young Building in honor of his research has a collection of his famous introductions. Ten acres on UConn's Plant Science and Education Research Facility, just off Route 195 south of the Storrs campus and adjacent to Waxman's house, hold the largest witch's broom collection of dwarf conifers in North America.

In recognition of his horticultural endeavors, Waxman received the Jackson Dawson Medal from the Massachusetts Horticultural Society, the Award of Merit from the International Plant Propagators Society, and awards from the New England Nursery Association and other groups.

Waxman died of cancer in 2005. He was survived by his wife, Florence, and their three children. Florence Waxman died in 2017.
