= Oksana Tanasiv =

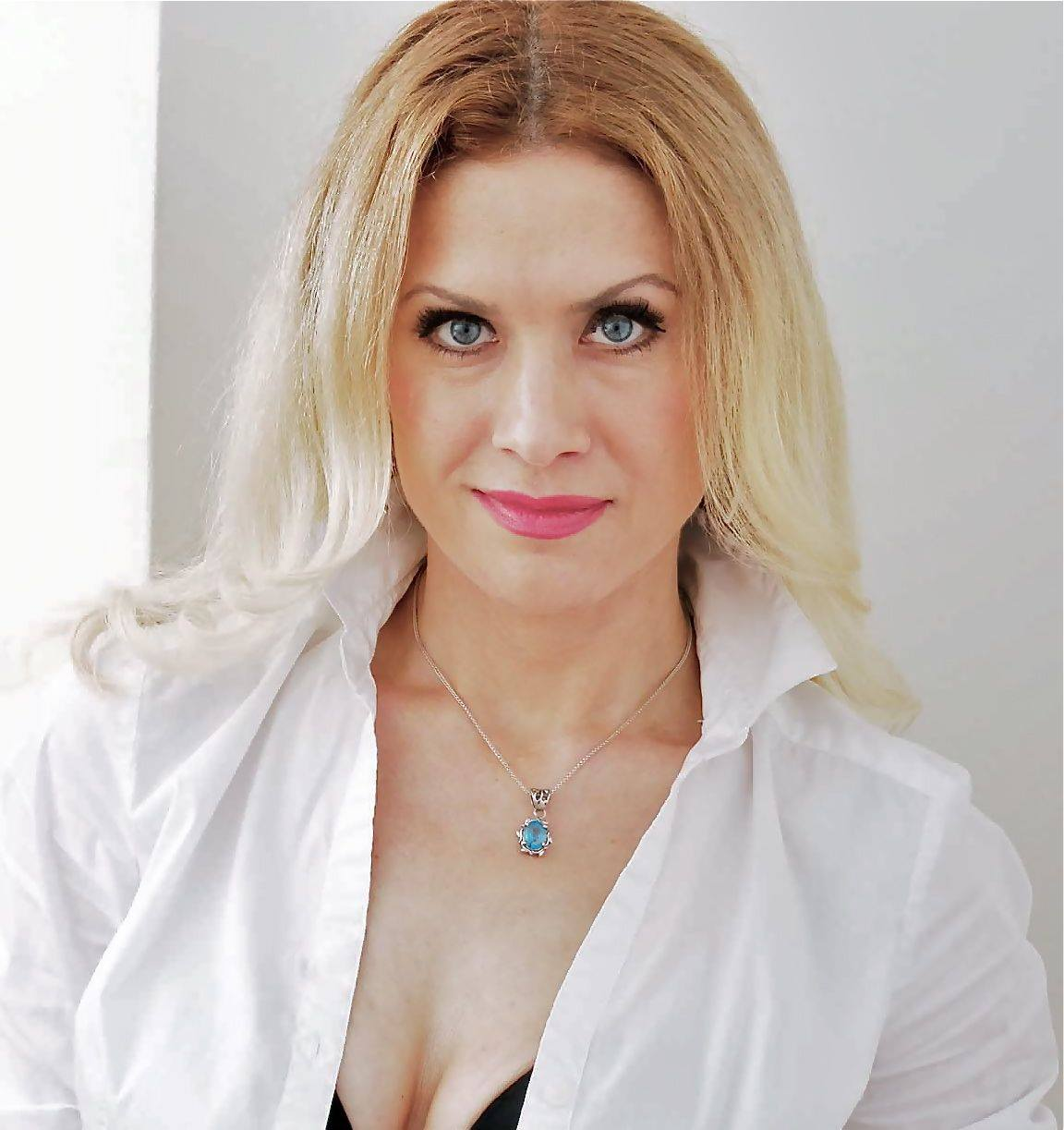
- Born: Ternopil, Ukraine
- Education: Ternopil Volodymyr Hnatyuk National Pedagogical University; University of Connecticut; Ternopil National Economic University
- Occupation: Artist
- Website: oksanatanasiv.com

Oksana Tanasiv, who also goes by the artist name OKSI, is a Ukrainian-American contemporary artist.

== Personal life ==
Oksana Tanasiv was born in Ternopil, Ukraine and she spent her childhood years in Samoluskivtzi, Husiatyn Raion (district) where she graduated secondary school in 1992. In 1996, she then graduated from the Chortkiv Pedagogical College. Following this, Tanasiv became a student at Ternopil Volodymyr Hnatyuk National Pedagogical University where she studied pedagogy and psychology and graduated in 1999. In 2003, she achieved another bachelor's degree in Business in Ternopil National Economic University.

Following her university schooling, in 2004 Tanasiv won a Diversity Immigrant Visa (Green Card Lottery) lottery and immigrated to the United States. She then finished ESL (English as a Second Language school) at Norwalk Community College and became a student of University of Connecticut in 2007. In 2011, she graduated from UCONN with a bachelor's degree of General Studies. During 2014-2015, Tanasiv supported the Evromaydan Auction organized by Ukrainian Diaspora in United States. She donated 100% from the sale of many art pieces presented during the online auction in support of Ukrainian soldiers injured at war, orphans, and families suffered from war on the East of Ukraine.

== Collections ==
Tanasiv has created several thematic series over time, using mixed mediums and newly developed styles in addition to Pop Art, Realism, and Surrealism. As of 2018 she had produced twelve collections.

=== Couture Installations and Fashion Art ===
Tanasiv creates ‘couture art’, which implements the use of fabric into her canvases, including tulle and other materials like Swarovski crystals. Pieces that included her stitching of crystals into her work as her Art Beyonce. Her Couture Art is part of her Fashion Art series that also include Odeur de Chanel collection and the Fashion Illustration collection Pieces created by Tanasiv have drawn inspiration from designers including Pucci and Dior. Tanasiv also developed the technique of “oil stitching”, which uses a thin tubing and oil paint in tandem. Each year her pieces have been shown as a part of the Couture Fashion Week in New York City. In addition to the US, she has also shown her work in Portugal, the UK, and other parts of Europe.

=== Dollar Art ===
Tanasiv began her Dollar Art series in 2011 as reaction to the political corruption of her home country, which uses the dollar bill image as a motif. Her exhibitions of the works in this series have included the work other artists, including sculptors. In 2018 she exhibited her most recent work in this series at the exhibition Money World: Social Consequences of Greed. Pieces have also been inspired by the issue of gender inequality. Many pieces feature the use of monetary banknotes in the work.

=== Code U ===
Tanasiv has also developed a series of works based upon traditional Ukrainian culture entitled Code U. The work uses abstract geometrical compositions in net-folk style featuring ancient symbols, signs, and patterns, done using mixed media techniques on board. The works are based on traditional Ukrainian embroidery.

=== Reincarnation ===
Reincarnation is series that Tanasiv created from 2015-2016, based upon famous deceased personalities represented through collage, oil and silver/gold leaf on canvas.
