= Bette Talvacchia =

American art historian

- Born: Bette Lou Talvacchia; 1951 (age 74–75); United States
- Occupations: Art historian Educator

Academic background
- Education: University of Texas at Austin; Stanford University
- Thesis: Giulio Romano's Sala di Troia: A Synthesis of Epic Narrative and Emblematic Imagery (1981)
- Doctoral advisor: Kurt Forster

Academic work
- Discipline: Art history
- Sub-discipline: Renaissance art
- Institutions: University of Connecticut; University of Oklahoma

Bette Lou Talvacchia (born 1951) is an American art historian and educator. Talvacchia is the Board of Trustees Distinguished Professor of Art History Emeritus at the University of Connecticut.

== Career ==
Talvacchia earned a Master of Arts in art history from the University of Texas at Austin in 1975. There, she wrote a thesis on the Italian Futurist artists Giacomo Balla and Filippo Tommaso Marinetti. Talvacchia then continued on to Stanford University to receive a Doctor of Philosophy in Art History in 1981. Her doctoral dissertation was on the work of Giulio Romano from the Ducal Palace in Mantua, under the supervision of Professor Kurt Forster.

A scholar of Renaissance art, Talvacchia has taught at the University of Connecticut since graduating from Stanford. She is now the Board of Trustees Distinguished Professor of Art History Emeritus at the University of Connecticut. Talvacchia has been a Fellow of Villa I Tatti, operated by Harvard University. In 2003, she was awarded a Faculty Excellence in Research Award.

From 2016 to 2019, Talvacchia served a stint as the Director of the School of Visual Arts at the University of Oklahoma, succeeding Mary Jo Watson.

== See also ==
- List of Stanford University people
- List of University of Connecticut people
- List of University of Texas at Austin alumni
