= Mark C. Urban =

American biologist

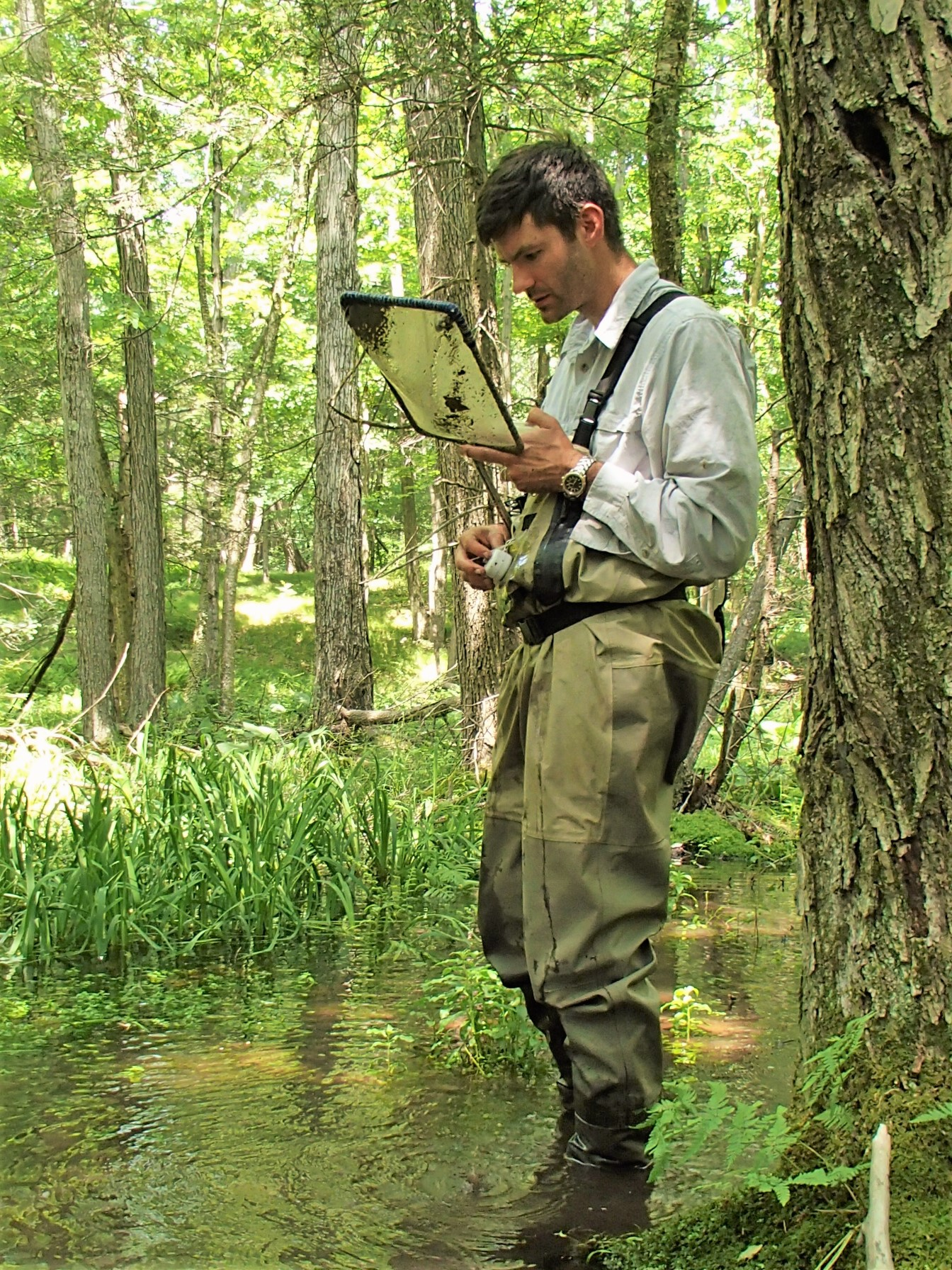
- Urban conducting field work
- Born: Bath, Pennsylvania, U.S.
- Education: Yale University (Ph.D.); Yale University (M.E.Sc.); Muhlenberg College (B.S.)
- Occupation: Biologist
- Awards: American Society of Naturalists Young Investigator Award (2008) American Society of Naturalists Presidential Award (2016)
- Scientific career
- Fields: Community ecology, evolutionary biology, climate change biology
- Institutions: University of Connecticut
- Thesis: Evolution and ecology of species interactions across multiple spatial scales
- Website: http://hydrodictyon.eeb.uconn.edu/people/urban/

Mark C. Urban is an American biologist and associate professor in ecology and evolutionary biology at the University of Connecticut. His work focuses on the ecological and evolutionary mechanisms that shape natural communities across multiple spatial scales.

== Education ==
Urban received his B.S. in environmental science and political science at Muhlenberg College in 1998 (summa cum laude). He received his M.E.Sc. from the Yale School of Forestry & Environmental Studies in 2001 and his Ph.D. in 2006 from Yale University.

== Career ==
Urban was a Postdoctoral Fellow at the National Center for Ecological Analysis and Synthesis (NCEAS) in Santa Barbara, California from 2006 to 2008. In 2008, Urban joined the faculty of the Ecology and Evolutionary Biology department at the University of Connecticut as an assistant professor and became a full professor in 2019.

== Work ==
Urban has contributed to biology by advocating for tighter linkages between ecology and evolutionary biology, suggesting the prevalence of fine-scaled microgeographic adaptation in nature, and highlighting the accelerating extinction risk from global warming.

=== Eco-evolutionary dynamics ===
As a contributor to the subfield of Eco-evolution, he is one of the founders of the evolving metacommunity framework, which emphasizes the joint interaction between species-sorting and local adaptation across environmental patches linked by dispersal in determining patterns of diversity across natural landscapes. He has also contributed to the community monopolization hypothesis which states that evolution alters the assembly and eventual configuration of communities because initial colonists adapt to local conditions and affect the ability of future species to establish.

=== Microgeographic adaptation ===
He and his colleagues defined and provided evidence for so-called microgeographic adaptation, the adaptation of populations at scales finer than expected based on their dispersal ability. He suggests that adaptation might occur much more often at fine scales because migrants often do poorly outside of their local environment, thus affecting the realized gene flow. Microgeographic adaptation might therefore often affect local patterns of biodiversity than commonly expected.

=== Climate change biology ===
Urban has contributed to our understanding of climate change effects on species and communities. He described the biotic multipliers of climate change, which are species both sensitive to climate change and with disproportionate effects on communities and ecosystems. These species are often top predators, and should be the ones to study first because they might have the greatest effects on other species. He also helped develop the boxcar effect, whereby species in cooler regions prevent species in warmer regions from tracking their preferred thermal environment through competition. Urban also showed that only evolution might be able to protect all diversity from climate change effects. He recently found that the extinction risk from global warming not only increases with warmer temperatures, but actually accelerates. His work suggests that if we follow a business-as-usual emissions climate change scenario, then 1 in 6 species could become threatened with extinction from climate change. He has suggested that we still know too little about how climate change is affecting nature and need renewed efforts to predict and mediate its effects.

== Selected publications ==
Urban has published over 40 scientific articles (including five in Science, PNAS, and Nature Climate Change).

- Urban, M. C. et al. 2016. Improving the forecast for biodiversity under climate change. Science. 353: 1113.
- Urban, M. C. 2015. Accelerating extinction risk from climate change. Science. 348: 571–573.
- Urban M.C. & Richardson J.L. 2015. The evolution of foraging rate across local and geographic gradients in predation risk and competition. American Naturalist. 186: E16–E32.
- Urban, M. C., R. Bürger, and D. I. Bolnick. 2013. Asymmetric selection and the evolution of extraordinary defenses. Nature Communications. 4:1-8.
- Zarnetske, P. L., D. K. Skelly, and M. C. Urban. 2012. Biotic multipliers of climate change. Science. 336:1516-1518.
- Norberg, J., M. C. Urban, M. Vellend, C. A. Klausmeier, & N. Loeuille. 2012. Eco-evolutionary responses of biodiversity to climate change. Nature Climate Change. 2(10): 747–751.
- Urban, M. C., J. J. Tewksbury, and K. S. Sheldon. 2012. On a collision course: competition and dispersal differences create no-analogue communities and cause extinctions during climate change. Proceedings of the Royal Society B. 279:2072-2080.
- Urban, M. C. 2007. Risky prey behavior evolves in risky habitats. Proceedings of the National Academy of Sciences of the USA. 104(36): 14377–14382.
- Buckley LB, Urban MC, Angilletta MJ, Crozier LG, Rissler LJ, and Sears MW. 2010. Can mechanism inform species distribution models? Ecology Letters 13:1041-1054.

== Popular works ==
- Urban, M. C. and Linda A. Deegan. T-shirt weather in the Arctic. The New York Times. February 5, 2016.
- Urban, M. C. and R. Capers. Change has come, time for leadership. Hartford Courant. December 2, 2012.
- Urban, M. C. 2004. The town that sold its sunset. River Teeth. 5(2): 90–102.

== Awards and honors ==
Urban received the 2016 American Society of Naturalists Presidential Award and the 2008 American Society of Naturalists Young Investigator Award. His work on accelerating extinction risks to species from climate change was highlighted as #15 top news story of 2015 by Discover Magazine. In 1997, Urban was selected as a Udall Scholar from the Morris K. Udall and Stewart L. Udall Foundation. Urban graduated summa cum laude with honors and highest honors in two majors at Muhlenberg College in 1998.
