= Kevin Swick =

American professor of childhood development

Kevin J. Swick is an American professor of childhood development and proponent of parent involvement through an empowerment model, advocating the theories of Urie Bronfenbrenner, Joyce Epstein, Ellen Galinsky, and James P. Comer, especially within his book Strengthening parents and families during the early childhood years (1993).

A professor of early childhood education, Swick earned his Ph.D. from the University of Connecticut in 1970 and played a major role in designing the early childhood education program (bachelor's and graduate levels) at the University of South Carolina.
