= Guozhen Lu =

American mathematician

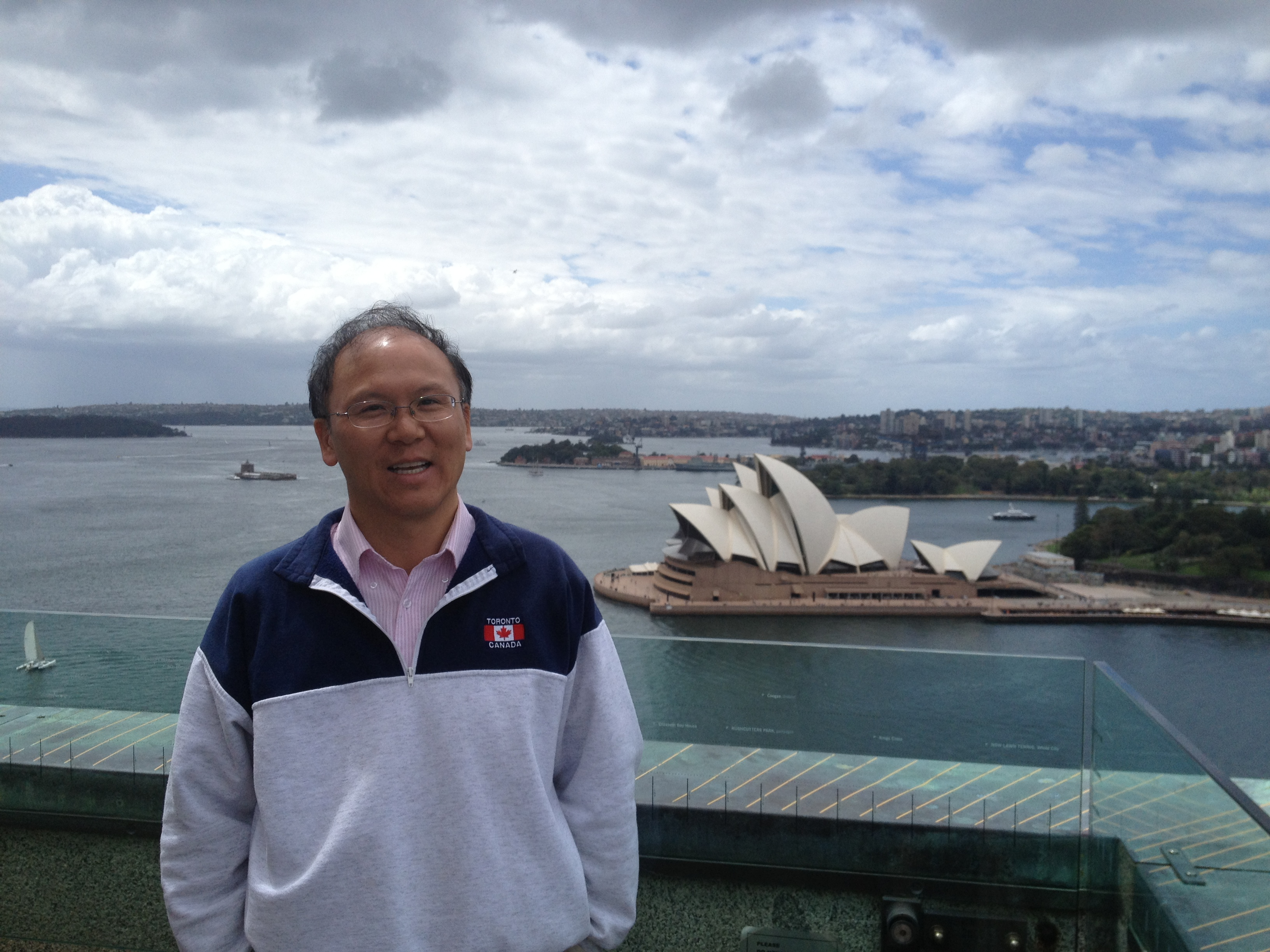
Guozhen Lu

Guozhen Lu (Chinese: 陆国振; born 1963) is a professor of mathematics at the University of Connecticut. He is known for his contributions to harmonic analysis, geometric analysis, and partial differential equations.

== Education and career ==
Lu graduated from Zhejiang University in Hangzhou, China in 1983 and earned his Ph.D. from Rutgers University in 1991. He was a Bateman Research Instructor in the Department of Mathematics at the California Institute of Technology from 1991 to 1993, an assistant professor in the Department of Mathematics and Statistics at Wright State University from 1993 to 1997, and an associate professor of the same department from 1997 to 2000 before he moved to Wayne State University. He became a professor of mathematics at Wayne State University in 2002. He joined the University of Connecticut in 2016 as a professor. Lu has co-organized many international conferences, including the series of the East Asian Conference in Harmonic Analysis and Applications, which is held annually, rotating between China, Japan, and Korea. Lu is the founding organizer, since the beginning of the pandemic in 2020, together with his past and current PhD students, of the worldwide online seminar "Geometric and Functional Inequalities and Applications."

== Awards and honors ==
Lu was elected Fellow of the American Association for the Advancement of Science, class of 2023, and elected to the Connecticut Academy of Arts and Sciences, class of 2023-2024, and to the Connecticut Academy of Science and Engineering, class of 2025. In 2015 and 2023, Lu was awarded a Simons Fellowship in Mathematics from the Simons Foundation. In 2017, he was elected to the 2018 class of Fellows of the American Mathematical Society, "for contributions to harmonic analysis and partial differential equations, and for service to the mathematical community." The Association for Women in Mathematics named him to their 2025 Class of AWM Fellows. Lu was elected in March 2026 as an honorary member of Phi Beta Kappa.

== Editorial board service ==
Lu has served as an editor of numerous mathematical research journals including Nonlinear Analysis, Advanced Nonlinear Studies Acta Mathematica Sinica (English Series), Communications on Pure and Applied Analysis, Journal of Pseudo-Differential Operators and Applications, The Journal of Geometric Analysis, and Bulletin des Sciences Mathématiques, also known as the Darboux Journal, founded by Guston Darboux in 1870.

Since January 2022, Lu has served as the Editor-in-Chief of Advanced Nonlinear Studies (De Gruyter). Since 2023, Lu serves as Editor-in-Chief of the book series de Gruyter Studies in Mathematics. As of 2024, Lu is the Editor-in-Chief of Forum Mathematicum.

== Community service ==
Lu has served as a member of the Michigan governor's advisory council on Asian Pacific American Affairs from 2005 to 2009, and as a commissioner of Michigan Asian Pacific American Affairs Commission from 2009 to 2016.
