= Margaret Flinter =

American nurse practitioner and health care executive

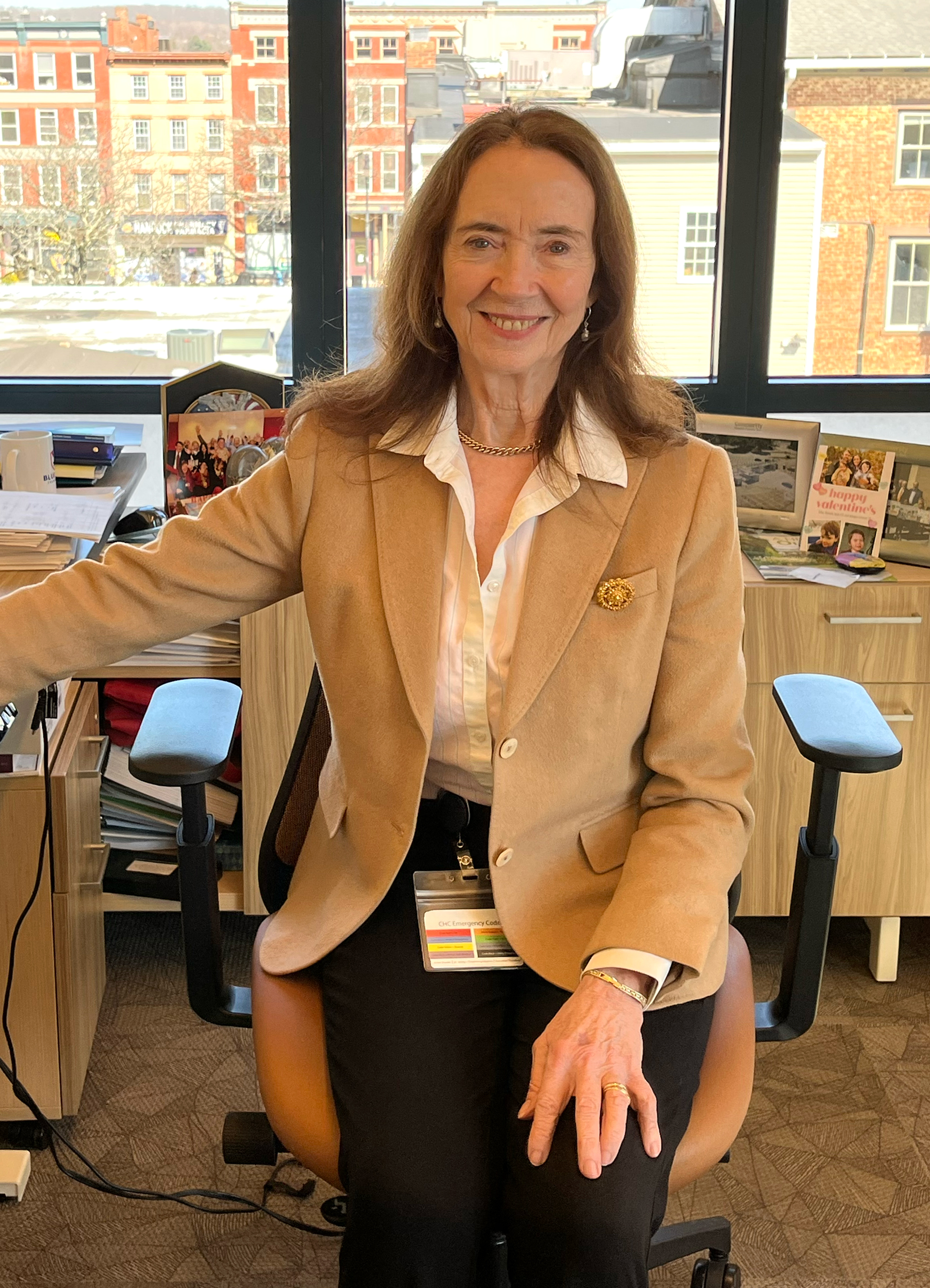
- Born: 1953 (age 72–73)
- Education: University of Connecticut (BSN, PhD); Yale University (MSN)
- Known for: Postgraduate residency training for nurse practitioners
- Scientific career
- Fields: Nursing; primary care
- Workplaces: Community Health Center, Inc.
- Thesis: From New Nurse Practitioner to Primary Care Provider: A Multiple Case Study of New Nurse Practitioners Who Completed a Formal Post-Graduate Residency Training (2010)

Margaret Flinter (born 1953) is an American nurse practitioner and health care executive. She is senior vice president and clinical director of Community Health Center, Inc. (CHC), the largest federally qualified health center in Connecticut, and founder of the Weitzman Institute. She joined CHC in 1980 as a National Health Service Corps scholar, and in 2007 launched the first formal postgraduate residency training program for nurse practitioners in primary care. This training model is now used nationally by health systems including the Department of Veterans Affairs. Flinter and colleagues later established the Consortium for Advanced Practice Providers, which is recognized by the Department of Education as an accrediting organization for postgraduate nurse practitioner and physician assistant training programs.

Flinter is a fellow of the American Academy of Nursing and the American Association of Nurse Practitioners. She co-chaired Connecticut's health-reform bodies, the HealthFirst Connecticut Authority and the State-Wide Primary Care Access Authority, during the lead-up to the Affordable Care Act. She has testified before the U.S. Senate as an expert on primary care.

== Selected publications ==
- Flinter, Margaret (2011). "From New Nurse Practitioner to Primary Care Provider: Bridging the Transition through FQHC-Based Residency Training". Online Journal of Issues in Nursing. 17 (1): 6. PMID 22320872.
- Hart, A. M.; Seagriff, N.; Flinter, Margaret (2022). "Sustained Impact of a Postgraduate Residency Training Program on Nurse Practitioners' Careers". Journal of Primary Care & Community Health. 13 21501319221136938. doi:10.1177/21501319221136938. PMC 9663609. PMID 36373693.
- Flinter, Margaret; Quarles, K. (2022). Training the Next Generation: Residency and Fellowship Programs (PDF). Weitzman Institute.
- Flinter, Margaret; et al. (2025). "National Assessment of Health Center Readiness to Train Health Profession Students". BMC Health Services Research. 25 (1) 976. doi:10.1186/s12913-025-13046-4. PMC 12291254. PMID 40707953.
