= Josephine Dolan =

American nursing historian and educator (1913 - 2004)

Josephine A. Dolan
- Born: July 27, 1913; Cranston, Rhode Island
- Died: December 4, 2004 (aged 91); Westborough, Massachusetts
- Education: Boston University
- Years active: 1944-1976
- Medical career
- Profession: Nurse, educator, historian
- Field: nursing education
- Institutions: University of Connecticut
- Awards: American Nurses Association Hall of Fame inductee

Josephine Aloyse Dolan (1913-2004) was a historian and educator who served as the first full-time professor of nursing at the University of Connecticut's School of Nursing. In additional to her teaching responsibilities, Dolan was a historian who collected nursing documents, artifacts, and ephemera, which she donated to the School of Nursing in 1996 to establish the Dolan Collection of Nursing History. After Dolan died, the collection was co-curated by her friend and colleague Eleanor Krohn Herrmann, who died in 2012.

Dolan earned her nursing diploma from St. John's Hospital in Lowell, Massachusetts in 1935. She earned bachelor's and master's degrees in nursing from Boston University in 1942 and 1950. She received honorary doctoral degrees from Rhode Island College in 1974 and from Boston College in 1987. Dolan also served on the board of directors for several professional associations, including the National League for Nursing. She received the League's first Distinguished Service Award in 1972 and was inducted into the American Nurses Association Hall of Fame in 2012. The Connecticut Nurses Association has awarded the Josephine A. Dolan Award for Outstanding Contributions to Nursing Education since 1980. Dolan authored the seminal textbook, Nursing in Society: A Historical Perspective.
