= Eleanor Krohn Herrmann =

American academic (1935–2012)

- Born: February 1, 1935; New York City, New York, US
- Died: July 31, 2012 (aged 77); Cheshire, Connecticut, US
- Spouse: Lawrence Herrmann

Academic background
- Education: Adelphi University (B.S.); University of Colorado (M.S.); Teachers College, Columbia University (EdD)

Academic work
- Discipline: Nursing education Nursing history
- Institutions: University of Connecticut

Eleanor Krohn Herrmann (1935–2012) was an American nursing educator and historian who taught at several universities, concluding her career at the University of Connecticut (1987–1997). She was co-curator of the Josephine Dolan Collection of Nursing History.

== Early life and education ==
Herrmann was born in New York City on February 1, 1935, to Swedish immigrant parents Martin and Ellen (Polson) Krohn. She grew up on a farm in Great Barrington, Massachusetts. When she was 13, her father died when his tractor crushed him, leaving her mother, a teacher, to raise five children. Hermann worked her way through college, earning her bachelor's degree in 1957 in nursing from Adelphi University and becoming an emergency room nurse. She then earned her first master's degree in 1960 at the University of Colorado and her master's in 1976 and doctoral degrees in 1979 in education at Teachers College, Columbia University. Herrmann's 1979 doctoral dissertation was entitled The Development of Nursing Education in Belize (British Honduras), Central America, 1920-1970.

== Career ==
Hermann taught nursing, alternative nursing, nursing ethics, and nursing history at the University of Wyoming, Syracuse University, the University of Colorado, Cornell University, and Yale University. She received Yale's Annie Goodrich Award for Excellence in Teaching. She concluded her career at the University of Connecticut, where she taught for a decade until her retirement in 1997. She was co-curator of the UConn's School of Nursing's Josephine Dolan Collection of Nursing History, developed by her friend and colleague Josephine Dolan.

Committed to social justice, Herrmann was active in nursing education and professional development initiatives in Central and South America. She served as the World Health Organization’s advisor to Belize's nursing school in the late 1970s and conducted oral history interviews and preserved crumbling records into the late 1980s.

Herrmann was a charter member and past president of the American Association for the History of Nursing. She authored several books and many journal articles and served on editorial boards and review panels for several scholarly journals. She was a fellow of the American Academy of Nursing and a member of Sigma Theta Tau, the Cheshire Historical Society, the Women's Auxiliary of the Silver City Detachment Marine Corps League, and the Standardbred Retirement Foundation.

== Select publications ==
- Capturing Nursing History: A Guide to Historical Methods in Research, 2008.
- Virginia Avenel Henderson: Signature for Nursing, 1998.
- Origins of Tomorrow: A History of Belizean Nursing Education, 1985.
- Nursing in Society: A Historical Perspective 15th ed., 1983.

== Death and legacy ==
Herrmann died at home in Cheshire, Connecticut on July 21, 2012. She was survived by her husband of forty-three years, Lawrence Herrmann, a recognized attorney and Marine Corps veteran. They had no issue. Opened in 2012, the Eleanor Krohn Herrmann Reading Room at the UConn School of Nursing was named in her honor.

Herrmann's papers are held at the University of Connecticut's Archives and Special Collections, to which she donated them in 1998.
