= Peter Niedmann =

Peter Niedmann (born October 12, 1960, New London, Connecticut) is an American composer of predominantly choral and organ music.

Niedmann studied at the University of Hartford's Hartt School of Music and University of Connecticut, and held a conducting fellowship with Sir David Willcocks. He formerly served on the faculty of the Hartt School, University of Hartford and at Dance Connecticut.

His music has been heard at the 1999 Papal Mass in St. Louis , and the White House. His music is published by Augsburg-Fortress, GIA, Thorpe-Theodore Presser, Concordia, Selah, Paraclete. Some of his hymns and service music have been included in recent Episcopal and UCC hymnals. Niedmann is the recipient of numerous commissions, including the AGO Region I 2005 Convention featured organ work. He was a prize-winner in the AGO National Organ Improvisation Competition. He serves as the Organist & Director of Music for the Church of Christ, Congregational, in Newington, Connecticut.
