= Vincent Zarrilli =

- Born: Vincent Francis Zarrilli; April 26, 1932; Bridgeport, Connecticut, United States
- Died: March 28, 2018 (aged 85); Framingham, Massachusetts, United States
- Education: University of Connecticut
- Occupations: Businessman; Activist
- Spouse: Mary Elise Larkin (m. 1954)
- Children: 5
- Parent(s): Michael Zarrilli; Gina DiMaio

Vincent Francis Zarrilli (April 26, 1932 – March 28, 2018) was an American businessman and activist. Zarrilli owned and operated the cookware store called The Pot Shop in Boston and other locations within Massachusetts. He was also a noted critic of the Big Dig in Boston.

== Career ==
A native of Bridgeport, Zarrilli was born to Michael Zarrilli (1897-1950) and Gina DiMaio (1894-1976). Zarrilli attended Central High School in his hometown. In 1954, he graduated from the University of Connecticut and married Mary Elise Larkin (1930-2019).

Five years later, Zarrilli opened a cookware store named The Pot Shop. Its first location was on Boylston Street in Boston. He later opened other locations such as on Boston Post Road in Sudbury, where he resided, in 1962. Today, the company operates as an online-only store run in Framingham by his daughter Mary Zarrilli and her husband, Rick Connaughton.

Zarrilli became an activist and major opponent of the Big Dig and its effect on traffic in Boston. He proposed the Boston Bypass as an alternative project. The plan consisted of building a ten-mile double-deck road-and-rail bridge over Boston Harbor from Dorchester to Charlestown, including railway access to Logan Airport. Its intent was to remove traffic from the Central Artery.

In 1995, Zarrilli entered the Boston City Council election for District 1 councillor. He ran against Diane J. Modica and John Hugo. Modica won the race with Zarrilli receiving fifteen percent of the votes.

In 1996, Zarrilli published a book titled "Boston Beanpot Cookery."

Zarrilli died in 2018.

== Works ==
- Boston Beanpot Cookery, 1996 ISBN 978-1891827006

== See also ==
- List of people from Bridgeport, Connecticut
- List of University of Connecticut people
