= Albert E. Van Dusen =

American historian

Albert Edward Van Dusen
- Born: May 14, 1916; Vilas, North Carolina, US
- Died: November 26, 1999 (aged 83); Mansfield, Connecticut, US
- Occupation: Historian

Academic background
- Education: Wesleyan University (BA); University of Pennsylvania (MA, PhD)

Academic work
- Discipline: American history
- Sub-discipline: History of Connecticut
- Institutions: University of Connecticut
- Notable works: Connecticut (New York: Random House, 1961)

Albert Edward Van Dusen (May 14, 1916 – November 26, 1999) was an American historian who served as professor of history at the University of Connecticut from 1949 to 1983. He also served in the unpaid honorary position of Connecticut State Historian from 1952 to 1985. His research materials and personal papers are held in the UConn Library's Archives and Special Collections at the Thomas J. Dodd Research Center.

== Early life and education ==
Van Dusen was born in Vilas, North Carolina, and raised in Syracuse, New York, where his father, Albert P. Van Dusen, was a professor of sociology. His mother was Chloe C. Lewis Van Dusen. He attended Northwood School in Lake Placid and received his Bachelor of Arts degree in history from Wesleyan University in 1938. He went on to earn his Master of Arts and PhD degrees in history from the University of Pennsylvania.

== Academic career ==
During World War II, Van Dusen taught in the V-12 Navy College Training Program at Duke University and briefly served in the army in 1945. After short stints as a visiting professor at Wesleyan University and as a Department of the Army historian, Van Dusen joined the University of Connecticut in 1949. Governor John Davis Lodge appointed him Connecticut State Historian in 1952.

During his 34 years at UConn, Van Dusen introduced courses in Connecticut and American colonial and revolutionary history. He oversaw the granting of UConn's first doctorate in history and was voted one of the university's five best teachers in 1964. He served on many state commissions, including the American Revolution Bicentennial Commission, the Commission on the Preservation and Restoration of the Connecticut State Capitol, and the Connecticut Historical Commission, on which he served for 34 years. He founded the Mansfield Historical Society and the Association for the Study of Connecticut History. He also served on the Council of the American Association for State and Local History and was a trustee and officer of the Antiquarian and Landmarks Society.

Van Dusen received numerous awards and honors, including the Director's Award from the Connecticut League of Historical Societies, a Festschrift from the Association for the Study of Connecticut History, and an Award of Distinction from the American Association for State and Local History. He was a member of the Acorn Club, elected in 1953. He and his wife endowed the Albert E. and Wilda E. Van Dusen Scholarship for UConn history graduate students and the Albert and Wilda Van Dusen Chair in Academic Medicine at the UConn Health Center.

Van Dusen authored numerous books and articles, including Puritans Against the Wilderness: Connecticut History to 1763 (Chester, CT: Pequot Press, 1975) and Connecticut: A Fully Illustrated History of the State from the Seventeenth Century to the Present (New York: Random House, 1961). Connecticut went through five printings and sold over 33,000 copies.

== Personal life ==
In 1946, Van Dusen married Wilda Elizabeth (Reep) Van Dusen (1923–2005), his former student at Duke. They remained married for 53 years until his death. Wilda Van Dusen excelled at doing archival research, proofreading, editing, and indexing on her husband's behalf. She also accompanied him on his public speaking engagements. The couple had no issue.

Albert died at the age of 83 on November 26, 1999. Wilda died in 2005. Both were interred in the New Storrs Cemetery, on a hill overlooking UConn's campus.
