= Albert N. Jorgensen =

7th President of the University of Connecticut (1935–1962)

7th President of the University of Connecticut
- In office September 1935 – 1962
- Preceded by: Charles C. McCracken
- Succeeded by: Homer D. Babbidge Jr.

Personal details
- Born: March 20, 1899 Lanark, Illinois
- Died: February 11, 1978 (aged 78) Scottsdale, Arizona
- Spouse: Harriet S. Jorgensen
- Education: Coe College (B.A.); University of Iowa (M.A.); Iowa State University (Ph.D.)
- Profession: Academic administration

Albert Nels Jorgensen (1899 – 1978) was an American academic administrator who served as the seventh president of the University of Connecticut (1935–1962). Its longest-serving president and its youngest at age 36 at the time of his appointment, Jorgensen led UConn's transformation from a sleepy agricultural college to a major modern university. UConn came into existence by renaming Connecticut State College in 1939. Student enrollment rose from 844 in 1935 to 11,877 in 1962—an increase of over 1,400%. Opened in 1955, the Jorgensen Center for the Performing Arts on the university's Storrs campus was named in Jorgensen's honor. The Harriet Jorgensen Theatre is named after his wife.

== Life and career ==
Born in Lanark, Illinois, in 1899 to Danish immigrant parents, Jorgensen was raised in Sabula, Iowa. He earned a bachelor's degree in English from Coe College in 1921 and worked as school principal in Sabula, Iowa, and school superintendent in Arlington, Iowa. He received his MA degree in psychology from the University of Iowa in 1925 and PhD in educational administration from Iowa State University in 1929.

Jorgensen held positions at Iowa State University, Michigan State University, and the University of Buffalo (1931–1935) before assuming office as UConn's seventh president in 1935.

== UConn presidency ==
Jorgensen quickly proved a visionary advocate for state higher education, delivering speeches to hundreds of groups around the state and obtaining $3 million of new funding from the state legislature within three years of his appointment. In 1943, UConn took over the running of the Hartford College of Law, which became the University of Connecticut School of Law in 1948. UConn began awarding doctoral degrees by 1950 and launched a medical school (now part of UConn Health) in 1961. Among the buildings erected during Jorgensen's tenure were the iconic Wilbur Cross Library with its golden dome, the Edwina Whitney and Walter Childs Wood residence halls, a concert hall, student union, engineering and home economics buildings, the Social Sciences (Henry Ruthven Monteith) and Humanities (Jamie Homero Arjona) Buildings, and the Physical Education Building and Memorial Stadium to support surging interest in college athletics and the new Yankee Conference. A Fort Trumbull campus was established for returning World War II veterans; it ultimately became UConn's Avery Point regional campus. New regional campuses were also opened in Stamford and Torrington. In 1935, only one national honorary society was represented at UConn. By 1960, twenty-six national honorary societies had established chapters there, including Phi Beta Kappa in 1956. Such was Jorgensen's impact on UConn's trajectory that his presidency was termed "the Jorgensen Transformation" by university historian Bruce M. Stave.

Jorgensen's presidency was also marked by controversies over academic freedom. The president defended a German-American professor accused of disloyalty during World War II, though the professor was ultimately stripped of his citizenship and deported. During the McCarthy era, a UConn physics professor and former Communist Party member refused to betray the names of other party members to the House Un-American Activities Committee. Jorgensen resisted political pressure to fire him, though the faculty member ultimately resigned. Toward the end of his presidency, Jorgensen clashed with the faculty over issues of compensation, shared governance, and academic standards.

Jorgensen served as president of the American Association of State Colleges and Universities and on the boards of the American Council of Education and the National Commission on Accrediting. He was a member of the president's council of the Association of Public and Land-Grant Universities and a fellow of the American Association for the Advancement of Science. He also held honorary doctorates from Coe College, the University of Maine, the University of Massachusetts, the University of Rhode Island, and Rhode Island College.

== Later life and death ==
After his retirement from UConn in 1962, Jorgensen served as director of the Washington office of the Institute of International Education for five years. He died in Scottsdale, Arizona, in 1978. He was survived by his wife, Harriet Spring Jorgensen, and their two children.

Academic offices
Preceded by Charles C. McCracken	7th President of the University of Connecticut; 1935-1962	Succeeded by Homer D. Babbidge Jr.
