= Babbidge =

Babbidge is a surname. Notable people with the surname include:

- Benjamin Harris Babbidge (1836–1905), Australian alderman and mayor
- Christopher Babbidge (born 1949), American politician
- Homer D. Babbidge Jr. (1925–1984), American historian
  - Homer D. Babbidge Library
