= John T. Casteen III =

American educator and academic administrator (1943–2025)

7th President of the University of Virginia
- In office October 6, 1990 – August 1, 2010
- Preceded by: Robert M. O'Neil
- Succeeded by: Teresa A. Sullivan

11th President of the University of Connecticut
- In office August 1985 – October 1990
- Preceded by: John A. DiBiaggio
- Succeeded by: Harry J. Hartley

4th Virginia Secretary of Education
- In office January 16, 1982 – August 1985
- Governor: Chuck Robb
- Preceded by: J. Wade Gilley
- Succeeded by: Donald Finley

Personal details
- Born: John Thomas Casteen III; December 11, 1943 Portsmouth, Virginia, U.S.
- Died: March 18, 2025 (aged 81) Keswick, Virginia, U.S.
- Spouse: Betsy Foote
- Children: 5
- Education: University of Virginia (BA, MA, PhD)
- Profession: Professor, Academic Administrator
- Salary: $797,048 (2008)
- Website: Office of the President Emeritus

John Thomas Casteen III (December 11, 1943 – March 18, 2025) was an American educator. He served as president of the University of Connecticut from 1985 to 1990 and as Professor of English and president of the University of Virginia from 1990 through 2010.

== Early life and career ==
Casteen was born at Portsmouth, Virginia, in 1943. Casteen earned his B.A. (1965), M.A. (1966) and Ph.D. (1970) degrees in English from the University of Virginia. He was a medievalist and member of Phi Beta Kappa. From 1968 to 1969, he wrote a column called "Soundings" for the student newspaper, The Cavalier Daily, in which he wrote about the administration of the university, conducting sympathetic interviews with deans and defending the policies of the administration.

Casteen began his professional career teaching English at the University of California, Berkeley, and later at the University of Virginia. From 1975 to 1982, he served as Dean of Admissions at the University of Virginia, resigning to serve as Virginia Secretary of Education under Governor Charles S. Robb from 1982 to 1985. While serving as secretary, he taught as an adjunct professor at Virginia Commonwealth University.

== President of the University of Connecticut ==
Casteen served as the eleventh president of the University of Connecticut from August 1985 through October 1990. In 1987, the university became the first public university in New England to ascend to the top-tier ranking of Doctoral Universities - Very High Research Activity (R1) of the Carnegie Classification of Institutions of Higher Education. Enrollment rose from 23,878 students in 1985 to 26,478 in 1990, while the university's endowment rose from $2 million to $23 million. However, UConn continued to struggle with shrinking state support and deteriorating campus infrastructure.

In 1988, the west side of the Homer Babbidge Library, which had opened in 1978 and was already experiencing structural deficiencies, was wrapped in safety netting to prevent bricks from falling off the facade and injuring passersby. The building remained wrapped in plastic—a state of affairs that historian Bruce M. Stave described as an "institutional embarrassment"—until 1998. Casteen lent his support to the University Library's successful efforts to fund the construction of the Thomas J. Dodd Research Center to house the university's archives and special collections.

Starting in his second year, Casteen taught an introductory English literature class to stay in touch with his teaching roots. More intellectual and reserved than his gregarious predecessor, John A. DiBiaggio, Casteen was an aloof and demanding, albeit effective, president.

In July 1990, Casteen submitted his resignation, effective October 1990, to accept the presidency of the University of Virginia. He had told many of his friends that leading his alma mater was his life's ambition. Casteen was succeeded as UConn president by Harry J. Hartley.

== President of the University of Virginia ==
As president of the university, Casteen advocated increasing UVA's enrollment of women, minority, and economically disadvantaged students. In 2003, he directed the creation of AccessUVA, the university's full-need financial aid program. He presided over substantial growth, both financial and physical, at UVA. He embedded himself in campus life, serving in roles such as liaison to the alumni board of relations and faculty advisor to the St. Anthony Hall Literary Society. Casteen led two financial campaigns for the university's endowment, one with a goal of $1 billion and another (ongoing) with a $3 billion goal.

During Casteen's tenure, major building projects included Hereford College, Bryan Hall, the Robertson Hall expansion of Rouss Hall for the McIntire School of Commerce, the South Lawn Project, the Albert and Shirley Small Special Collections Library, the University Bookstore, the Aquatic and Fitness Center, and John Paul Jones Arena.

Casteen announced on June 12, 2009, that he would retire in 2010. His 20-year tenure is the second longest of any University of Virginia president, after Edwin Alderman.

== Business interests ==
Beginning in 1986, Casteen held numerous positions as a director in business organizations, including his first for the Connecticut Bank and Trust Company and Wachovia Corporation. He was a director of SAGE Publications, Jefferson Science Associates LLC and the Virginia University Research Partnership, and was elected a director of Altria on February 22, 2010.

== Personal life and death ==
Casteen was married to Betsy Foote, and they had five children. Casteen died in Keswick, Virginia, on March 18, 2025, at the age of 81.
