= Edwina Whitney =

American librarian and educator (1868–1970)

Edwina Maud Whitney
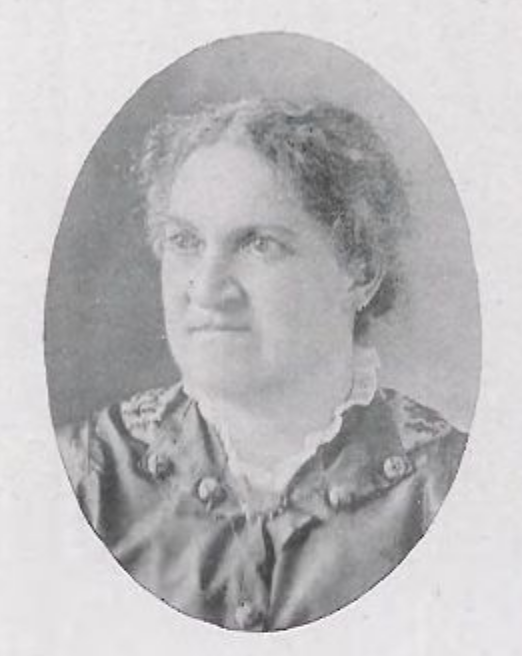
- Whitney circa 1916
- Born: February 26, 1868; Storrs, Connecticut
- Died: September 3, 1970 (aged 102); Storrs, Connecticut
- Monuments: Edwina Whitney Hall (UConn)
- Education: Oberlin College (BA)
- Occupations: Librarian, educator
- Employer: University of Connecticut

Edwina Maud Whitney (February 26, 1868 – September 3, 1970) was an American librarian and educator who served as one of the earliest librarians at the Connecticut Agricultural College (later the University of Connecticut) from 1900 to 1934. She also served as a German instructor from 1901 to 1926 and an assistant professor of German from 1926 to 1934.

== Early life and education ==
In 1866, two years before Edwina's birth, her parents, Edwin and Minerva Whitney, founded the Connecticut Soldiers' Orphans' Home in Storrs, Connecticut. Over nine years, the home housed and educated more than 150 boys and girls orphaned by the American Civil War. The orphanage's main building was known as Whitney Hall or "Old Whitney." The orphanage shut down in 1875 and was sold in 1878 to a neighbor, Augustus Storrs. In 1881, Storrs donated the buildings and fifty acres of land to the State of Connecticut to found Storrs Agricultural College. Whitney Hall thus became the UConn's first campus building.

Edwina Whitney was born in the Whitney homestead on Route 195 in Storrs, Connecticut, on February 26, 1868. Her father died a few months before she was born, leaving her mother to run the orphanage and raise their daughter. Edwina attended grade school in Storrs alongside future Connecticut governor Wilbur Lucius Cross. She attended Middletown High School and Northfield Seminary and earned a Bachelor of Philosophy degree from Oberlin College in 1894.

Whitney taught German and English at Milwaukee College in Wisconsin for one year before returning to Connecticut to teach at Windsor High School for four years. In 1900, she completed a library science course at Amherst College, studying under William I. Fletcher. She later attended summer courses at Columbia University.

== Career and service ==
In the fall of 1900, Connecticut Agricultural College hired Whitney to manage the library and bookstore, then comprising two cramped rooms in Old Whitney Hall. She succeeded Jessie Spencer Bowen, who had served as the college's first librarian since 1897 and resigned when she got married. The library held only 8,127 volumes at the time. It lacked space, electricity, and a proper collection development budget, though the situation improved under presidents Charles L. Beach and George A. Works.

Whitney was the sole breadwinner of her household, which consisted of her mother (who died in 1927 at the age of 91) and her lifelong companion and housekeeper, Pearl Fisher (who died in 1955). Hired at $500 a year, Whitney's salary climbed to $2,000 by 1920 and peaked at $2,800 in 1929.

Active in the college and the community, Whitney founded the college's Women's Club in 1903 and served as its president for six years. She belonged to the Mansfield chapter of the Connecticut State Grange from 1901 to 1940 and served as its secretary until 1903. She was a member of the American Library Association and the Connecticut Library Association and regularly attended their annual meetings.

On March 21, 1934, college president Charles C. McCracken asked her to retire, which she did effective July 1. She received numerous accolades at retirement. The faculty passed resolutions celebrating her thirty-four years of service, and the college granted her the status of emeritus librarian and the honorary degree of Master of Letters—the only honorary degree UConn awarded to staff during the first century of the institution's existence. The May 29, 1934 issue of the Connecticut Campus was dedicated to her. With thirty-four years of service, she was the longest-serving head librarian in the institution's history (the runner-up, John P. McDonald, served twenty years).

Her hundredth birthday party in 1968 was attended by UConn president Homer D. Babbidge and provost emeritus Albert E. Waugh, who presented her with a plaque and a cake with 100 candles. She received official greetings from President Lyndon B. Johnson, Governor John Dempsey, and Oberlin College President Robert K. Carr.

== Personal life ==
Whitney donated her diary spanning 1901 through 1952 to the Mansfield Historical Society in 1960. Her diary is filled with acerbic comments about students conversing or making out in the library, along with laments about long-winded faculty meetings and the couples-oriented college social scene. She never married or had children.

Whitney died in her sleep at the age of 102 at the Natchaug Convalescent Hospital in Mansfield, where she had lived since 1962. She was interred in the family plot at Storrs Cemetery, on a hill overlooking the UConn campus. Her brief obituary in the Hartford Courant celebrated her as the "First Lady of Mansfield."

== Legacy ==
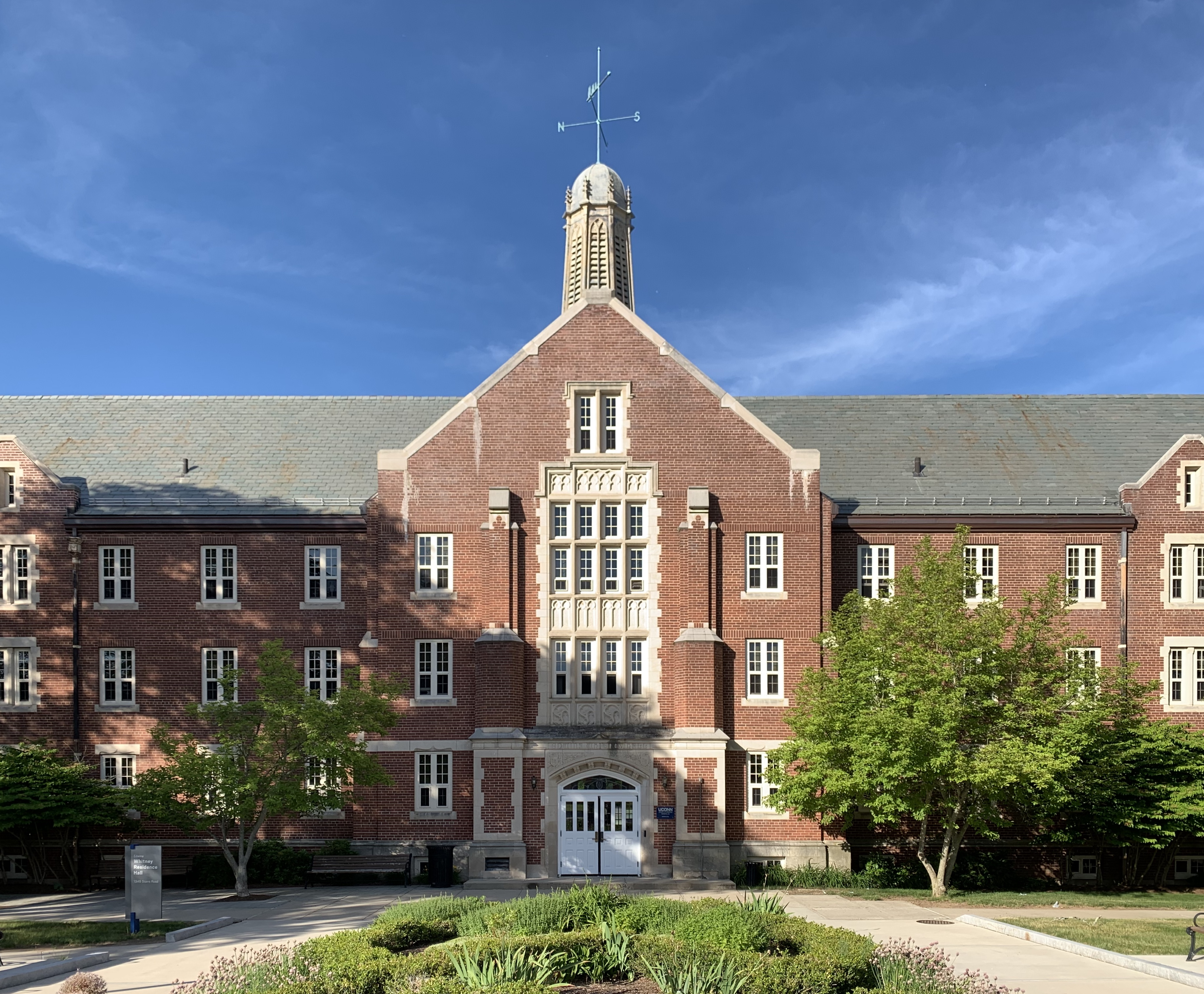
Edwina Whitney Residence Hall

Built in 1938, the Edwina Whitney Residence Hall on UConn's Storrs campus was named in Whitney's honor. So was the Edwina Whitney Library in the Storrs Congregational Church, of which she was a lifelong congregant and historian. Whitney Hall, named after her father, was the first major campus building. It was condemned in 1928 and demolished in 1932. The University of Connecticut used the Whitney family homestead for various purposes until 2004, after which it was vacant but maintained. In January 2023 the house was severely damaged in an electrical fire, it was deemed beyond restoration and the university demolished it in October 2023.
