= M. Estella Sprague =

American home economist and educator (1870–1940)

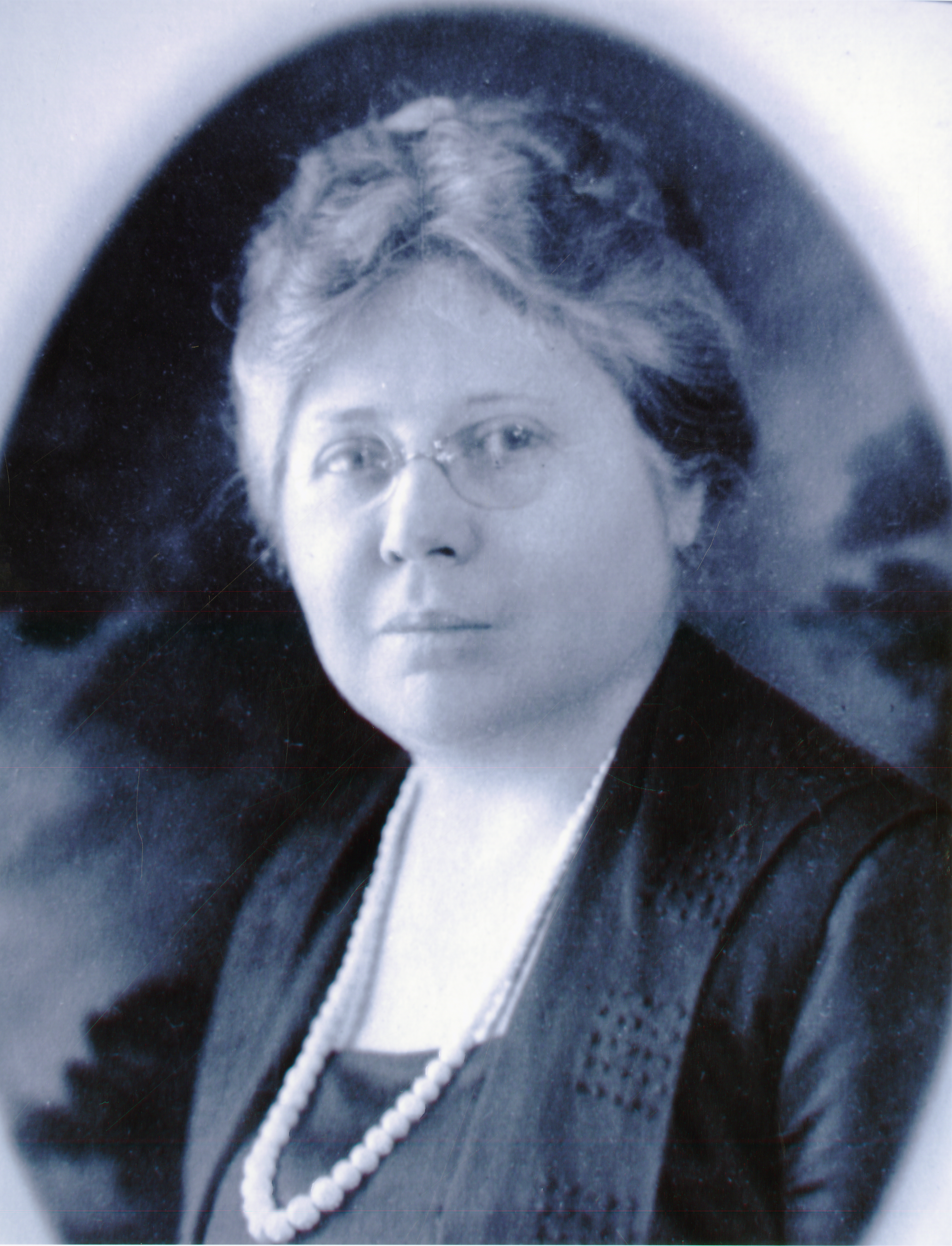
- Born: Mary Estella Sprague; January 1870; Massachusetts, U.S.
- Died: May 17, 1940 (aged 70); Templeton, Massachusetts
- Education: Bridgewater State University; Simmons University
- Occupation: Educator
- Known for: First woman academic dean at the University of Connecticut

Mary Estella Sprague (1870 – May 17, 1940) was an American home economics professor and academic administrator at the University of Connecticut, then Connecticut Agricultural College. She served as dean of women from 1917 to 1926 and as the first dean of the Division of Home Economics from 1920 to 1926.

== Life and career ==
Born in Massachusetts in January 1870, Sprague graduated from Bridgewater State Normal School as a member of the class of 1887. She taught in public schools for more than twenty years. After studying home economics at Simmons College, she became house director and teacher of home economics at Caroline Rest, a rest home for new mothers near Scarsdale, New York.

In 1914, she became the first woman extension service worker in Connecticut when she became assistant state leader of the Boys & Girls Clubs of America and later state leader of the Girls' Club. In November 1917, she was appointed a professor of home economics and Dean of Women at UConn. She lobbied President Charles L. Beach in 1922 to hire more senior faculty for the division. She served as Dean of Women from 1917 to 1926 and as the first Dean of the Division of Home Economics from 1920 to 1926. Dean Sprague supervised approximately four faculty members, all women. Under her leadership, enrollment in home economics rose from thirty to 120 students by 1926. Concurrently, the college's female enrollment rose to around 26% of the student population in 1925 and 31% in 1930, up from only 19% in 1920.

During World War I, Sprague served as state director of home economics for the U.S. Food Administration. Appointed in June 1917 and serving through the war's end in 1918, she coordinated Connecticut's women's organizations and coordinated a statewide campaign to bolster domestic food production and conservation in support of the war effort. UConn trustees noted that the job required "a woman of broad vision and forceful personality who knew Connecticut people," and that Sprague "more than met these requirements."

== Legacy ==
Built in 1942, the M. Estella Sprague Residence Hall, a three-story dormitory on UConn's main campus in Storrs, is named in her honor. In August 1926, she was the first woman to receive an "honorary recognition" given to "leaders in agriculture and rural life" by Connecticut Agricultural College.

Sprague left a substantial collection of costumes and textiles. Over 7,000 items were donated by Sprague and other collectors and assembled under the direction of faculty members Nellie Gard and Margaret Gaylord. Ranging from ancient Egyptian fabrics to contemporary designer dresses, the materials supported the curricular of the School of Home Economics. Most pieces dated from the 19th and early 20th centuries. An exhibit, "Perfect in Her Place: Women at Work in Industrial America," at the Homer Babbidge Library showcasing Sprague's collection ran from March through April 1985. In 2021, a curator was hired to prepare the M. Estelle Sprague Costume Collection for incorporation into the collection of the William Benton Museum of Art.

Sprague retired in 1926. She died after a long illness on May 17, 1940, in Templeton, Massachusetts, at the age of 70.
