= Gentry (surname) =

Gentry is a surname. Notable people with the surname include:

- Alvin Gentry (born 1954), American basketball coach
- Alwyn Howard Gentry (1945–1993), American botanist
- Andrew Gentry (born 2001), American football player
- Antonia Gentry (born 1997), American actress
- Bobbie Gentry (born 1944), American singer-songwriter
- Brady P. Gentry (1896-1966), U.S. congressman from Texas
- Charles B. Gentry (1884–1955), American academic administrator
- Curt Gentry (1931-2014), American writer
- Craig Gentry (computer scientist) (born 1973), American computer scientist
- Craig Gentry (born 1983), American professional baseball player
- Dennis Gentry (born 1959), American professional football player
- Emma Gentry (born 2002), American ice hockey player
- Eric Gentry (born 2003), American football player
- Eve Gentry (1909–1994), American modern dancer, pilates instructor
- Gary Gentry (born 1946), Major League Baseball pitcher
- Herbert Gentry (1919-2003), American Expressionist painter
- Howard Scott Gentry (1903-1993), American botanist
- Jerauld Richard Gentry (1935-2003), American test pilot and military officer
- Kenneth Gentry (born 1950), American theologian
- Loyd Gentry, Jr. (1925–2012), American horse trainer
- Meredith Poindexter Gentry (1809–1866), U.S. congressman from Tennessee
- Minnie Gentry (1915–1993), American actress
- Richard Gentry (1788-1837), American politician and military officer
- Robert Gentry (actor) (1940–2022), American actor
- Robert V. Gentry (1933–2020), Young Earth Creationist and nuclear physicist
- Ron Gentry (born 1943), American politician
- Rufe Gentry (1918-1997), Major League Baseball pitcher
- Sommer Gentry, American mathematician
- Teddy Gentry (born 1952), member of the country music band Alabama
- Troy Gentry (1967-2017), member of the country music duo Montgomery Gentry
- Tyson Gentry (born 1983), former American football player
- Viola Gentry (1894-1988), American aviator
- William Gentry (1899-1991), New Zealand military leader
- Zach Gentry (born 1996), American football player
