= Suzanne Wilson =

American professor

Suzanne M. Wilson
- Born: 1955 (age 70–71)

Academic background
- Education: Brown University; Stanford University

Academic work
- Institutions: Neag School of Education

Suzanne M. Wilson (born 1955) is an American professor of education. She is currently the Neag Endowed Professor of Teacher Education at the University of Connecticut's Neag School of Education. She is a fellow of the American Academy of Arts and Sciences and a member of the National Academy of Education.

Wilson graduated from Brown University with a Bachelor of Arts in American Civilization in 1973. She received a Master of Science in Statistics and a doctorate in Psychological Studies in Education from Stanford University in 1986 and 1968, respectively. She was previously a University Distinguished Professor at Michigan State University.

Wilson wrote the introduction for the 2019 AAAS ARISE Commissioned Paper Series.
