= Philip E. Austin =

American college president

Interim President of the Connecticut Board of Regents for Higher Education
- In office October 2012 – June 30, 2013
- Preceded by: Robert A. Kennedy
- Succeeded by: Gregory W. Gray

13th President of the University of Connecticut
- In office October 1996 – September 2007
- Preceded by: Harry J. Hartley
- Succeeded by: Michael J. Hogan

3rd Chancellor of the University of Alabama System
- In office 1989–1996
- Preceded by: Thomas A. Bartlett
- Succeeded by: Thomas C. Meredith

11th President of Colorado State University
- In office 1984–1989
- Preceded by: Ralph E. Christoffersen
- Succeeded by: Albert C. Yates

Personal details
- Born: March 25, 1942 (age 84) Fargo, North Dakota, US
- Education: North Dakota State University (B.S.); North Dakota State University (MS); Michigan State University (M.A.); Michigan State University (Ph.D.)
- Profession: Academic administrator, economist

Philip E. Austin (born March 25, 1942) is an American economist who served as the 13th president of the University of Connecticut from October 1, 1996, to September 14, 2007. He returned to serve as interim president in May 2010 following the abrupt departure of Michael J. Hogan. Prior to UConn, Austin served as president of Colorado State University (1984–1989) and chancellor of the University of Alabama System (1989–1996).

== Early life and career ==
Austin was born on March 25, 1942, in Fargo, North Dakota.

He attended North Dakota State University, where he earned his B.S. degree in 1964 and his M.S. degree in 1966, both in agricultural economics. He was an honored member of the Sigma Chi fraternity on campus, where his life efforts were later credited with the Significant Sig recognition award. He went on to earn an M.A. and Ph.D. in economics from Michigan State University in 1969.

Austin served in the United States Army from 1969 through 1971 as an economist stationed at the US military headquarters in Saigon, Vietnam. He attained the rank of captain and received the Bronze Star, the Joint Service Commendation Medal, and the Army Commendation Medal.

He subsequently served as an economist in the director's office of the US Office of Management and Budget from 1971 to 1974. From 1974 to 1977, he was deputy assistant secretary of education in the US Department of Health, Education, and Welfare, including a stint as acting assistant secretary of education. He was one of a three-person team invited by the Danish government to evaluate Denmark's educational programs and policies.

Austin subsequently transitioned to academic administration, serving as director of the interdisciplinary doctoral program in public policy at George Washington University. From 1978 to 1984, he served as provost and vice president for academic affairs at Baruch College.

== Administrative career ==
=== President of Colorado State University ===
From 1984 to 1989, Austin served as president of Colorado State University and chancellor of the Colorado State University System, which included Colorado State University–Pueblo and Fort Lewis College in Durango. He also held the academic rank of professor in the Department of Economics and the Department of Finance.

=== Chancellor of the University of Alabama System ===
From 1989 to 1996, Austin served as chancellor of the University of Alabama System, which included campuses in Tuscaloosa, Birmingham, and Huntsville.

=== President of the University of Connecticut ===
Austin served as the thirteenth president of the University of Connecticut for eleven years, from 1996 to 2007. During Austin's tenure, UConn underwent a physical transformation made possible by the state's UConn 2000 and 21st Century UConn infrastructure investment programs, totaling $2.3 billion. While UConn 2000 was already underway when Austin arrived, Austin was instrumental in persuading Governor John G. Rowland and the legislature to add another $1.3 billion for the new 21st Century UConn initiative starting in 2005. Seventy new or renovated buildings reflected the scale of the program. The 21st Century UConn program also funded construction of a new $60 million research tower at UConn Health, which included more than thirty laboratories. Although cost overruns and code violations troubled this massive construction campaign, the results were transformative.

In 2004, Austin concluded a capital campaign that raised $470 million, significantly higher than its $300 million goal. This unprecedented sum included a $23 million naming gift from Raymond and Carol Neag to the Neag School of Education—the largest gift ever made to a public university in New England. Other donations enabled the establishment of fifty-two new endowed chairs and professorships. Notwithstanding these fundraising successes, a planned private-public partnership with Pfizer, which would have led to the construction of a $35 million animal vaccine research facility on the scenic Horsebarn Hill in Storrs, foundered in 1999 in the face of intense opposition from local citizens and environmentalists. Austin dealt with other controversies during his tenure, including notoriously chaotic Spring Weekends that attracted 20,000 drunken revelers, including many non-students, to campus parking lots and off-campus apartment complexes.

Academics and athletics also grew under Austin's stewardship. UConn's football program advanced to Division I-A with the construction of the Pratt & Whitney Stadium at Rentschler Field, which opened in 2003 in East Hartford. Enrollment grew while the average SAT score of freshmen rose 82 points. Research funding increased from $61 million in 1994 to $92 million in 2004. The University of Connecticut Humanities Institute (UCHI) was founded in 2001. U.S. News & World Report ranked UConn as the top public university in New England and 27th best in the nation.

=== Other Connecticut leadership roles ===
In September 2007, Austin resigned his position as President of the university and returned to the faculty. In a December 2006 editorial, the Hartford Courant declared Austin "one of the most productive and professional leaders in the university's 125-year history," who led the university "from a respected regional institution to a national presence."

Following his departure, Austin was recipient of several university honors. The Philip E. Austin Building (formerly the College of Liberal Arts and Sciences Building) was named in his honor in 2012. The Philip E. Austin Endowed Chair in public policy at UConn was created in his honor. He was one of only five UConn presidents to be designated a president emeritus.

Following his successor Michael Hogan's abrupt departure three years later, Austin returned to serve as UConn's interim president from June 2010 through May 2011.

From July 2011 through May 2012, Austin served as UConn Health's interim vice president for health affairs.

At the request of Governor Dannel Malloy, Austin served as interim president of the Connecticut Board of Regents for Higher Education from October 2012 through June 2013.

== Public service ==
Austin chaired the board of the National Collegiate Athletic Association (NCAA) Division I and served as president of the New England Association of Schools and Colleges (NEASC). He served on the boards of Connecticut United for Research Excellence, the Governor's Council on Economic Competitiveness and Technology, and the MetroHartford Alliance. He also served on the boards of several corporations, including the First Interstate Bank of Fort Collins, the Alabama Power Company, the American Cast Iron Pipe Company, and Fleet Bank.

== Personal life ==
After stepping down as UConn president, Austin lived in West Hartford. He is divorced with two adult sons.

Academic offices
Preceded by Harry J. Hartley	13th President of the University of Connecticut; October 1996-September 2007	Succeeded by Michael Hogan
Preceded by Ralph E. Christoffersen	11th President of Colorado State University; 1984-1989	Succeeded by Albert C. Yates
