= Harry Hartley =

Harry Hartley may refer to:

- Harold Hartley (politician) (1875–1958), engineer-fitter and member of the Queensland Legislative Assembly
- Harry J. Hartley (born 1938), American educator and academic administrator
