= Charles B. Gentry =

American teacher and administrator (1884–1955)

Charles Burt Gentry

Acting President of the University of Connecticut
- In office September 1928 – July 1929
- Preceded by: Charles L. Beach
- Succeeded by: George A. Works
- In office May–October 1935
- Preceded by: Charles C. McCracken
- Succeeded by: Albert N. Jorgensen

Personal details
- Born: October 3, 1884 Drexel, Missouri
- Died: November 16, 1955 (aged 71) Storrs, Connecticut
- Spouse: Kathleen Moore
- Education: University of Chicago (B.S.); Cornell University (M.S.)
- Profession: Professor of education, academic administrator

Charles Burt Gentry (1884–1955) was an American teacher-educator and two-time acting president of the University of Connecticut from September 1928 to July 1929 and again May–October 1935. Gentry also served as dean of the Division of Teacher Training (1921–1940), state supervisor of vocational agriculture (1921–1931), director of the Division of Instruction (1931–1939), and university dean, equivalent to provost (1939–1950).

The Neag School of Education is headquartered in the Charles B. Gentry Building, completed in 1960 and named in Gentry's honor in 1969. The building received a $10 million revamp in 2004, adding a 20,000-square-foot wing and becoming the first wireless building on campus.

== Early life ==
Gentry was born in 1884 in Drexel, Missouri. He was one of four children of John Henry Gentry, a farmer, and Sarah Elizabeth Beatty, a schoolteacher. In 1895 he survived polio and consequently missed three years of school and walked only with effort, and a brace on his leg, for the rest of his life.

== Education and career ==
Gentry graduated high school in June 1904 and taught school while pursuing his A.B. from Warrensburg Teachers College, from which he graduated in 1910. He went on to receive a B.S. degree in education and botany from the University of Chicago in 1912. He taught science and agriculture at the Conway Normal School in Conway, Arkansas, for two years before accepting a professorship at the State Teachers College in Springfield, Missouri in 1914. Gentry and his family moved to Ithaca, New York, in August 1918 to study for an M.S. degree in agriculture at Cornell University, graduating in September 1919. Starting that autumn, he spent a year as an associate professor of agricultural education at Rutgers University in 1919–1920.

Gentry arrived in Storrs in September 1920 as a professor of agricultural education and director of teacher training. When college president Charles L. Beach retired in 1928, Gentry was recalled to Storrs from Cornell University, where he was teaching summer school, to serve as acting president for one year, until George A. Works assumed the presidency. College historian Walter Stemmons described Gentry's caretaker presidency as a year of "progress and achievement. The Bridgeport Herald newspaper in the spring of 1929 declared of Gentry's term as acting president:

Professor Gentry ... has maintained conditions at the college in a very satisfactory manner. He has made no attempt to dictate policy but has succeeded in establishing good will among students and faculty members and in maintaining the status quo."

After almost twenty years of service as dean, Gentry served for ten years as an effective and respected provost. Declining health prompted him to retire effective October 1, 1950.

According to Albert Waugh, who succeeded him as provost in 1950, Gentry was "universally trusted." He had a stoic, deliberative personality and was a caring albeit uncharismatic teacher.

Following retirement, Gentry remained in Storrs. He died at home of a heart attack on November 16, 1955, at the age of 71. He was buried in Storrs Cemetery, on a hill overlooking campus.

== Personal life ==
In 1912, Gentry married Kathleen Moore of Kansas City, Missouri, following a three-year engagement. Gentry was survived by his wife and three children.
