= Gantry =

A gantry is an overhead bridge-like structure supporting equipment such as a crane, signals, or cameras.

== Devices and structures ==
- Gantry (medical), cylindrical scanner assembly used for medical 3D-imaging or treatment
- Gantry (transport), an overhead assembly on which highway signs or railway signals are posted
- Gantry (rocketry), the frame which encloses and services a rocket at its launch pad
- Gantry crane, a crane having a hoist fitted in a trolley for parallel movement
  - Rubber tyred gantry crane, a mobile gantry crane used in intermodal operations
- Gantry tower or anchor portal, a structure commonly found in electrical substation or transmission line
- Scaffolding, occasionally referred to as a gantry when used as a support framework

== Places ==
- Gantry Plaza State Park, in New York City

== Arts, entertainment, and media ==
- Elmer Gantry, a 1927 novel by Sinclair Lewis
- Elmer Gantry (film), a 1960 film based on the novel
- Gantry (musical), a 1970 musical by Peter Bellwood, Fred Tobias, and Stanley Lebowsky, based on the novel

== See also ==
- Gentry (disambiguation)
