= Benton Museum =

Benton Museum may refer to:

- Benton Museum of Art at Pomona College
- William Benton Museum of Art at the University of Connecticut
