= Charles Gentry =

Charles Gentry may refer to:

- Charles B. Gentry (1884–1955), American teacher-educator, twice acting president of the University of Connecticut
- Chuck Gentry (1911–1988), American jazz saxophonist
