= Arthur Bronwell =

American college president

- Bronwell circa 1962

9th President of the Worcester Polytechnic Institute
- In office February 1955 – January 1962
- Preceded by: Alvin E. Cormeny
- Succeeded by: Harry P. Storke

Personal details
- Born: Arthur Brough Bronwell; August 18, 1909 Chicago, Illinois, US
- Died: May 10, 1985 (aged 75) Willimantic, Connecticut, US
- Scientific career
- Education: Illinois Institute of Technology (BS, MS); Northwestern University (MBA)
- Fields: Electrical engineering Engineering education
- Institutions: Northwestern University; Worcester Polytechnic Institute; University of Connecticut

Arthur Brough Bronwell (August 18, 1909 – May 10, 1985) was an American professor of electrical engineering who served as president of Worcester Polytechnic Institute (1955–1962) and dean of the University of Connecticut School of Engineering (1962–1970). A building on UConn's campus was named in his honor.

== Early life and career ==
Bronwell was born in Chicago on August 18, 1909. He received his BS degree in 1933 and his MS degree in 1936 from the Illinois Institute of Technology. Bronwell joined the faculty of Northwestern University in 1937 and became a full Professor of Electrical Engineering in 1947. From 1947 through 1954, he served as part-time executive secretary of the American Society for Engineering Education. During his tenure, ASEE's membership rolls increased from fewer than 4,000 to almost 7,000 members by 1951. In his capacity as executive secretary, he also served as editor of the society's journal, Journal of Engineering Education.

During World War II, Bronwell trained Army Signal Corps cadets on radar and acoustic location at Northwestern and oversaw a wartime research project to develop the B-29 bomber's radar system. He served on a joint US Army-State Department postwar mission to Japan on technological recovery. He also worked on special projects for Bell Labs and consulted for Motorola. In 1947, Bronwell invented what he termed the Chromoscope, a viewing tube for color TV; however, his invention never scaled to production.

While teaching at Northwestern University, Bronwell earned a Master of Business Administration from Northwestern in 1947. He also received an honorary Doctorate of Laws from Northeastern University and an honorary Doctorate of Engineering from Wayne State University.

== Worcester Polytechnic Institute ==
Bronwell was selected as the ninth president of Worcester Polytechnic Institute in fall 1954 and took office in February 1955. During his presidency, the number of faculty nearly doubled and enrollment grew from 800 to 1,200 students. The Alumni Gymnasium and the Morgan, Kaven, and Olin Halls were constructed and scientific laboratories renovated under his leadership. In addition, Bronwell diversified WPI's curriculum, adding more humanities and social sciences courses to round out the scientific curriculum. His capital campaign raised $5 million from donors in five years. He served on the National Science Foundation's advisory committee. His presidency marked the beginning of a transition for WPI from a provincial to a national university.

Bronwell's presidency saw the construction of WPI's nuclear research reactor. Funded by a grant of $150,000 from the US Atomic Energy Commission in 1958 and going critical on December 18, 1959, the Leslie C. Wilbur Nuclear Reactor Facility was "one of the first such facilities in the nation located on a university campus."

Bronwell accepted a position as dean of the University of Connecticut School of Engineering and resigned from WPI in January 1962.

== University of Connecticut ==
Bronwell assumed his duties as dean of the UConn School of Engineering on April 1, 1962. He oversaw rapid growth of the school, including construction of a new electrical engineering building (the third on UConn's Storrs campus) and computer center in 1968. He launched new graduate programs in aerospace, biological and environmental, transportation, urban, and ocean engineering, as well as the Institute for Material Science. Bronwell resigned as dean in July 1970 and retired from the faculty in 1977. UConn named its Engineering III building, constructed in Storrs under Bronwell's leadership, in his honor.

Bronwell was a member of the Council of Foreign Relations and a fellow of the Institute of Electrical and Electronics Engineers. He served as a US delegate to the UNESCO Conference on Engineering Education in Paris in December 1968.

== Personal life ==
Bronwell married Virginia Russel White in 1941. The couple had two children: James Arthur Bronwell and Susan Virginia Carter.

Bronwell died on May 10, 1985, at a Willimantic nursing home following a long illness. He was interred at Storrs Cemetery.

== Publications ==
Bronwell published three books in addition to numerous articles in IEEE Spectrum, Proceedings of the IRE, SIAM Review, Research Management, Electrical Engineering, and other journals. An academic reviewer hailed his Advanced Mathematics in Physics and Engineering as "a real contribution to scientific and engineering education." His book Science and Technology in the World of the Future was named one of the 100 best books of 1970 by Library Journal.

- Bronwell, Arthur B. (1970). Science and Technology in the World of the Future. Wiley-Interscience. ISBN 978-0-471-10594-7. OCLC 90596.
- Bronwell, Arthur B. (1953). Advanced Mathematics in Physics and Engineering. McGraw-Hill. OCLC 792744.
- Bronwell, Arthur B.; Beam, Robert E. (1947). Theory and Application of Microwaves. McGraw-Hill. OCLC 537666.
