= Edward Gentry =

Edward or Ed Gentry may refer to:

- Ed Gentry, co-author of The Citadels; see List of Forgotten Realms novels
- Ed Gentry, a character in the novel Deliverance

== See also ==
- Teddy Gentry, member of Alabama
- Gentry (disambiguation)
