= List of artworks by Ivan Albright =

The following is a list of notable artworks by American artist Ivan Albright (1897–1983), organized by medium and listed chronologically.

== Paintings ==
Image	Title	Date	Technique	Dimensions	Current location
	The Oaks in Winter	1918	Watercolor	unknown	unknown.
	Portrait of Marie Walsh Sharpe	1921	Oil on canvas	30 x 20 inches	Marie Walsh Sharpe Art Foundation, Colorado.
	The Philosopher	1922	Oil on paper laid to panel	24 x 18 inches	Private collection, formerly the Milwaukee Art Center.
	Portrait of a Man	ca. 1924	Oil on canvas	24 x 18 inches	Private Collection.
	I Am He of Whom He Spoke (Samson)	1925	Oil on canvas	26.13 x 20.13 inches	Lowe Art Museum, University of Miami.
	Fur Collar (formerly The Baskerville Portrait)	1925-1926	Oil on canvas	30 x 20 inches	National Academy of Design, New York.
	Paper Flowers	1926	Oil on canvas	26 x 20 inches	Private collection.
	Burgomaster With a Key	1926	Oil on canvas	30 x 24.25 inches	Detroit Institute of Arts.
	I Slept With the Starlight in My Face (The Rosicrucian)	1926	Oil on canvas	30 x 20 inches	Wadsworth Atheneum, Hartford.
	Portrait of the Artist's Father Adam Emory Albright	ca. 1926	Oil on canvas	Unknown	Unknown.
	I Walk To and Fro Through Civilization and I Talk As I Walk (Follow Me, The Monk)	1926-27	Oil on canvas	73 x 36 inches	Art Institute of Chicago.
	I Drew a Picture in the Sand and the Water Washed It Away (The Theosophist)	1927	Oil on canvas	36 x 23 inches	Art Institute of Chicago.
	The Lineman	1927	Oil on canvas	73 x 36 inches	Art Institute of Chicago.
	Memories of the Past	1927	Oil on canvas	29.5 x 20.5 inches	Art Institute of Chicago.
	Woman	1928	Oil on canvas	33 x 22 inches	Museum of Modern Art, New York.
	Maker of Dreams (Man With a Mallet, the Maker of Images)	1928	Oil on canvas	30 x 20.25 inches	Private collection.
	Flesh (Smaller Than Tears Are the Little Blue Flowers)	1928	Oil on canvas	36 x 24 inches	Art Institute of Chicago.
	Among Those Left (The Wheelwright, the Blacksmith)	1928-29	Oil on canvas	73 x 36 inches	Carnegie Museum of Art, Pittsburgh.
	Fleeting Time, Thou Hast Left Me Old	1928-29	Oil on canvas	30.25 x 20.25 inches	Metropolitan Museum of Art, New York.
	Heavy the Oar to Him Who is Tired, Heavy the Coat, Heavy the Sea	1929	Oil on canvas	55.38 x 34.25 inches	Art Institute of Chicago.
	There Were No Flowers Tonight (Midnight)	1929	Oil on canvas	48.5 x 30.25 inches	National Gallery of Art, Washington D.C.
	Beneath My Feet	1929	Oil on canvas	18 x 22 inches	Formerly collection of the artist.
	Into the World There Came a Soul Called Ida	1929-30	Oil on canvas	55 x 46 inches	Art Institute of Chicago.
	And Man Created God in His Own Image (Room 203)	1930-31	Oil on canvas	48 x 26 inches	Art Institute of Chicago.
	And Wherefore Now Ariseth the Illusion of a Third Dimension	1931	Oil on canvas	20 x 36 inches	Art Institute of Chicago.
	Nude (Fourteen Year Old Child)	1931	Oil on canvas	22 x 15 inches (framed)	Art Institute of Chicago.
	That Which I Should Have Done I Did Not Do (The Door)	1931-41	Oil on canvas	97 x 36 inches	Art Institute of Chicago.
	And The Starlight in Her Eyes	1932	Gouache	13.25 x 17.75 inches	Private collection.
	Self Portrait (Unfinished)	1933	Oil on canvas	15 x 11 inches	Los Angeles County Museum of Art.
	The Farmer's Kitchen	1933-34	Oil on canvas	36 x 30 inches	Smithsonian Institution, Washington D.C., transfer from the U.S. Department of Labor.
	Self Portrait	1934	Oil on canvas	30.25 x 18.25 inches	New Trier Township High School, Winnetka, Illinois.
	Self Portrait	1935	Oil on canvas	35 x 24 inches	Art Institute of Chicago.
	In the Year 1840 (Second Storeys Are Popular), or When Fall Winds Blow	1937	Tempera	14 x 22 inches	Dallas Museum of Fine Arts.
	After the Race	1938	Oil on canvas	36 x 20 inches	Forum Gallery, New York.
	Portrait of Peaches Willis	1938	Oil on panel	17 x 14.5 inches	Pennsylvania Academy of the Fine Arts.
	Shore Sentinels	1939	Oil on canvas	26 x 45 inches	Art Institute of Chicago.
	This Ichnolite of Mine	1940	Oil on canvas	14 x 7 inches	Art Institute of Chicago.
	Black Cliffs, Schoodic Point, Maine, or Maine Coast	1940	Gouache	25 x 19 inches	Art Institute of Chicago.
	Maine Landscape	1940	Gouache	13 x 19.25 inches	Private collection.
	Lobster Salad	1940	Oil on canvas	19.5 x 31.5 inches	Private collection.
	Lobsterman's Catch	1940	Oil on canvas	20 x 30 inches	Forum Gallery, New York.
	Ah God, Herrings, Buoys, the Glittering Sea	1940	Gouache	22 x 29 inches	Art Institute of Chicago.
	Stones at Stonington, Maine	1941	Gouache	14 x 20 inches	University of Iowa Museum of Art.
	Bride with a Cold	1941	Oil on panel	9.75 x 6.75 inches	Hirshhorn Museum and Sculpture Garden, Smithsonian Institution, Washington D.C.
	Divided and Divided	1941	Oil on canvas	27 x 42 inches	Art Institute of Chicago.
	Poor Room – There Is No Time, No End, No Today, No Yesterday, No Tomorrow, Only the Forever and Forever and Forever Without End (The Window)	1941-43 1948-55 1957-62	Oil on canvas	48 x 37 inches	Art Institute of Chicago.
	A Guttated Self Portrait – A Nutant Lycanthrope Seen in Glass	1943	Gouache	Unknown	Unknown.
	Still Life	1943	Oil on mahogany panel	14 1/2 × 21 inches	Middlebury College Museum of Art.
	The Picture of Dorian Gray	1943-44	Oil on canvas	85 x 42 inches	Art Institute of Chicago.
	Manifestation	1944	Oil on canvas	19.5 x 15.5 inches	William Benton Museum of Art.
	The Temptation of Saint Anthony	1944-45	Oil on canvas	50 x 60 inches	Art Institute of Chicago.
	Bridal Falls, Ten Sleep, Wyoming	1946	Gouache	12 x 18 inches	Art Institute of Chicago.
	After the Storm (Coastal Rocks, Corea, Maine)	1947	Gouache	21.38 x 29.5 inches	Private collection.
	Mephistopheles	1947	Oil on canvas	90 x 42 inches	Private collection.
	Roaring Fork, Wyoming	1948	Gouache	22.5 x 30.25 inches	Whitney Museum of American Art, New York.
	Around and Around	1948	Gouache	14.25 x 20.5	Private collection.
	We Are Gathered Here	1948	Gouache and watercolor	20 x 30.13 inches	Private collection.
	Self Portrait	1948	Oil on canvas	24 x 20 inches	National Academy of Design, New York.
	The Purist	1949	Gouache on panel	25.25 x 38.5 inches	Solomon R. Guggenheim Museum, New York.
	The Wild Bunch (Hole in the Wall Gang)	1950-51	Oil on canvas	30.5 x 42 inches	Phoenix Art Museum.
	Troubled Waves	1952	Oil on canvas	14 x 9 inches	Private collection.
	Tin	1952-54	Gouache on panel	32 x 45.5 inches	Formerly the collection of the artist.
	Portrait of Mary Block	1955-57	Oil on canvas	39.13 x 30 inches	Art Institute of Chicago.
	The Rustlers	1959, 1963–64	Gouache	22 x 40 inches	Art Institute of Chicago.
	Rue du Bac, Paris	1960	Gouache	25 x 15 inches	Private collection.
	Alicia Patterson	1962	Enamel on copper	4.88 inches diameter	Formerly collection of the artist.
	Red Onion	1962	Gouache	17.75 x 13.5 inches	Private collection.
	Captain Joseph Medill Patterson	1962-64	Oil on Masonite	30 x 24 inches	Art Institute of Chicago.
	Aspen Self Portrait	1963	Gouache	24 x 17 inches	Private collection.
	To Tread Between Sky and Field	1964	Gouache	18 x 24	Private collection.
	The Cliffs Revolve – But Slowly	1965	Gouache	16.25 x 24.13 inches	Private collection.
	Knees of Cypress (Reflections of a Cypress Swamp)	1965	Gouache on panel	16 x 20 inches	Union League Club of Chicago.
	If Life Were Life – There Would Be No Death (The Vermonter)	1966-77	Oil on panel	37 x 27 inches	Hood Museum of Art, Dartmouth College.
	The Trees: They Murmur So – Like People They Murmur – Murmur So	1967	Gouache	18 x 24 inches	Private collection.
	Self Portrait in Georgia	1967-68	Oil on panel	36 x 26 inches	Butler Institute of American Art.
	All Things Unassembled	1968	Gouache	16 x 20 inches	Private collection.
	There Comes a Time	1969	Gouache on canvas board	16 x 20 inches	Private collection.
	A Face From Georgia	1970	Oil on canvas	15.5 x 11	Art Institute of Chicago.
	In Light Rise the Domes of Rome	1970	Gouache	22.25 x 15.25 inches	William Benton Museum of Art.
	Lima, Peru	1971	Gouache	5.5 x 11.5 inches	William Benton Museum of Art.
	From Yesterday's Day	1971	Oil on canvas	8.5 x 15.25 inches	Private collection.
	Apple on Apple – Ascent on Descent – Move the Apples	1971	Gouache	5.63 x 11.63 inches	William Benton Museum of Art.
	The Image After	1972	Oil on canvas	8.5 x 15.25 inches	Private collection.
	Pray for These Little Ones (Perforce They Live Together)	1974	Oil on silk	10.5 x 16.5 inches	Art Institute of Chicago.
	The Sea of Galilee	1977	Gouache	14.5 x 20 inches	Formerly the collection of the artist.
	Spoof-Tavern Club-Martinized Venus	unknown	Oil on plywood, joined with hinges	96 x 96 inches	University of Michigan Museum of Art.

== Drawings ==
Image	Title	Date	Technique	Dimensions	Current location
	Three Love Birds	1930	oil and charcoal on canvas	78.25 x 42 inches	Art Institute of Chicago.
	Show Case Doll	1931-32	charcoal and oil on canvas	35 x 54 inches	Art Institute of Chicago.
	Here Within Me – Stand I	1935	charcoal	18 x 11.5 inches	American Israel Cultural Foundation.
	After the Race	1938	pastel on paper	27 x 14 inches	Private collection.
	Silver Miner's Row, Aspen, Colorado	1956	metalpoint on ivory wove paper prepared with a white ground	14 x 22 inches	Art Institute of Chicago.
	Elm Street Bridge Over the Ottauquechee	1965	metalpoint on off-white wove paper prepared with an ivory ground	16.5 x 20 inches	Art Institute of Chicago.
	The Fallen, Georgia, or The Old and the New, Georgia	1965	metalpoint on cream wove paper prepared with a cream ground	10.25 x 16 inches	Art Institute of Chicago.
	The Vermonter I	1965	charcoal on canvas	33 x 23.75 inches	Formerly the collection of the artist.
	The Vermonter II	1966	charcoal and oil on canvas	35 x 26.75 inches	Art Institute of Chicago.
	The Red Barn Walked Around Me	1968	metalpoint on off-white wove paper prepared with an ivory ground	16.5 x 20.25 inches	Art Institute of Chicago.
	The Old Woodstock Inn, Vermont	1968	metalpoint on off-white wove paper prepared with an ivory ground	20 x 16 inches	Art Institute of Chicago.
	First a Church – Then a Lumberyard	1969	metalpoint on off-white wove paper prepared with an ivory ground	16 x 20 inches	Art Institute of Chicago.
	The Snow Moves Through the Morning Trees	1972	charcoal and black crayon, with stumping and erasing, on white wove card	20 x 28 inches	Art Institute of Chicago.
	This Is Jill	1975	back crayon and graphite, on white clay-coated wove paper	15 x 13 inches	Art Institute of Chicago.
	I Mary	1975-76	black crayon, with white crayon, touches of white gouache, scratching and erasing, on off-white clay coated paper	20 x 16 inches	Art Institute of Chicago.
	Made When Legally Blind	1977	colored pencil	9 x 11.88	Formerly the collection of the artist.
