= Harry J. Hartley =

12th President of the University of Connecticut (1990–1996)

12th President of the University of Connecticut
- In office 1990–1996
- Preceded by: John T. Casteen III
- Succeeded by: Philip E. Austin

Personal details
- Born: 1938 Aliquippa, Pennsylvania
- Spouse: Dianne Hartley
- Children: Nicholas Haidous Hartley
- Education: Geneva College; University of Pittsburgh; Pennsylvania State University
- Profession: Academic administration

Harry J. Hartley (born 1938) was an American educator and academic administrator who served as the 12th President of the University of Connecticut (1990–1996). Prior to his presidency, Hartley had served twice as UConn's acting president (July 1987; July – December 1990), vice president for finance and administration (1975–1978; 1984–1987), and dean of the UConn School of Education (1972–1975).

== Early life and education ==
Hartley was born to teacher parents in Aliquippa, Pennsylvania, in 1938. Aspiring to become a stockbroker, he majored in economics at Geneva College and continued his studies at the University of Pittsburgh. After a stint as a substitute teacher, Hartley earned his PhD in educational administration at Penn State University.

== Career ==
After earning his doctorate, Hartley taught at the State University of New York at Buffalo and later served as associate dean at New York University. He authored a well-known program budgeting textbook, Educational Planning, Programming, Budgeting (Prentice Hall, 1968) and conducted a book tour that brought him to UConn's Storrs campus, where he later said he "felt at home." Hartley joined the University of Connecticut as dean of the School of Education in 1972 and served for three years. He later served a total of seven years as vice president for finance and administration. He was selected by the University Senate as distinguished professor of the year in 1984.

== Presidency ==
Following the abrupt resignation of UConn president John T. Casteen III, Hartley was appointed interim president in July 1990. Following a national search involving 117 candidates, Hartley was selected as the university's twelfth president, assuming office in December 1990.

As president, Hartley faced declining state support for the university's operating budget, which necessitated painful layoffs and tuition increases. He also had to contend with an activist board of trustees chaired by lawyer and former Connecticut state senator Lewis B. Rome, though he and Rome ultimately worked well together.

Hartley's administration and the trustees collaborated to write a ten-year strategic plan, "Beyond 2000: Change," which was adopted in February 1995. The plan boldly called for UConn to become a "world-class university" and "the outstanding public university in the nation."

=== UConn 2000 ===
Recognizing the dilapidated state of the university's physical plant, Hartley campaigned hard for the passage of Public Act 95-230, commonly known as UConn 2000. Passed with overwhelming bipartisan support in the state legislature and signed into law by Governor John Rowland in June 1995, UConn 2000 authorized UConn to issue state bonds and invest nearly $1 billion over ten years on capital improvements, including sixty-two major construction projects. UConn 2000 enabled the construction of new chemistry and pharmacy buildings, new residence halls, and major renovations to the Homer Babbidge Library, among other improvements. According to historian Bruce M. Stave, the effect was to "transform the campus infrastructure."

=== Athletics ===
College sports were a hallmark of Hartley's presidency. The Harry A. Gampel Pavilion had opened in January 1990, bolstering attendance at games. That winter the UConn men's basketball team was the Big East Conference Regular Season Champion and Tournament Champion and advanced to the Elite Eight of the 1990 NCAA Men's Basketball Tournament, and the team continued to raise its national profile throughout the 1990s. The UConn women’s basketball team won its first national championship in 1995. Hartley later acknowledged the role of women's team captain Rebecca Lobo, along with men's basketball team captain Kevin Ollie, in lobbying legislators and helping to pass UConn 2000. During his presidency, Hartley made a point of attending home games and strengthening athletics, considering sports to be what Jim Calhoun referred to as the university's "front porch."

=== Diversity ===
UConn made notable strides toward diversity during Hartley's presidency. To commemorate the university's first female students, Hartley declared a year-long "100 Years of Women at UConn" celebration in 1991. The Asian American Cultural Center and the Asian American Studies Institute were established in 1993 and the Institute for Puerto Rican Studies in 1994. The percentage of minority freshmen rose from 5.2% in 1990 to 18.9% in 1995.

=== Resignation ===
Publicly upbeat but "privately grown weary of the grinding fiscal crisis that dogged UConn throughout his presidency," Hartley submitted his resignation in mid-February 1996. A day earlier, Governor Rowland had proposed slashing another ninety university jobs, on top of an overall 10% reduction in force since 1990. Some of Hartley's responsibilities had been shifted to a new chancellor's position in 1995. In fact, Hartley had drafted his resignation a year earlier, but Rome had persuaded him to stay on for another year. Hartley remained in office until his successor, Philip E. Austin, was hired.

=== Assessment ===
Outgoing and affable, Hartley was a popular president. The Daily Campus student newspaper declared him Man of the Year in 1978. When his appointment was announced during a basketball game at the Gampel Pavilion, the crowd gave him a standing ovation that moved him to tears. The New York Times characterized Hartley as "one of the most beloved presidents in recent history" and a "pump-your-hand kind of guy," notorious for wearing a UConntracksuit around campus. However, Hartley's informal style and perceived undue emphasis on sports over academics drew the ire of some faculty.

Although encumbered by persistent budget crises and an activist board, Hartley was generally acknowledged as a successful albeit cautious president. His primary legacy was the UConn 2000 initiative, which laid the foundations for UConn's revitalization and emergence onto the national stage.

Hartley was one of only five former presidents to be honored with the title of President Emeritus.

== Later life ==
Following his resignation, Hartley took a year's leave and then returned to teaching. He retired in 2003 and moved to Palm Beach, Florida in 2004. In the mid-2010s, he and his wife, Dianne, endowed a $250,000 scholarship for students in the Neag School of Education.

Academic offices
| Preceded by John T. Casteen III | 12th President of the University of Connecticut; 1990-1996 | Succeeded by Philip E. Austin |
