= Eric Fertman =

American artist

- Born: 1974 (age 50–51); Boston, Massachusetts, U.S.
- Education: The Cooper Union
- Known for: Sculpture

Eric Fertman (born 1974) is an American artist living and working in Brooklyn, New York.

== Early life and education ==
Fertman was born in Boston, Massachusetts. He received his Bachelors in Fine Arts from The Cooper Union School of Art and Science in 1997.

== Career ==
Eric Fertman is best known as a sculptor. It has been written that Fertman’s practice ". . . gives absurdist humor many forms, from the wordplay of a title to gently ironic manipulations of the Modernist canon, to cartoon motifs lovingly crafted in wood, evoking a more sophisticated sense of humor." In a review for Sculpture Magazine, critic Jan Garden Castro has posited that "Eric Fertman's world mixes comic, Suprematist, and egalitarian art movements with innovative shapes and subtle wood processes to offer works strong in punk, funk, craft, and form."

Fertman has exhibited nationally, with solo shows at Southeastern Center for Contemporary Art (SECCA) in Winston-Salem, North Carolina; The Kemper Museum of Contemporary Art in Kansas City, Missouri; and, in a two-person presentation at Time Equities, Inc. for The Art-in-Buildings Program in New York City. He has participated in group shows at the Sculpture Center, NYC; the Boca Raton Museum of Art; and the William Benton Museum of Art at the University of Connecticut. He has work in the public collection of Fidelity Corporate Art Collection in Boston, Massachusetts, and the Cleveland Clinic.

The artist is represented by Susan Inglett Gallery, New York.

== Awards ==
- The Elliot Lash Award for Excellence in Sculpture, The Cooper Union (1997)
- The Ralph Bradley Award, The School of the Museum of Fine Arts (1993)
