= Alan T. Busby =

African-American educator (1895–1992)

- Busby in 1969
- Born: Alan Thacker Busby; December 12, 1895; Worcester, Massachusetts, US
- Died: June 10, 1992 (aged 96); Jefferson City, Missouri, US
- Education: Worcester Normal School; University of Connecticut (BS); Cornell University (MS)
- Occupation: Professor of Animal Husbandry
- Employers: Alcorn State University; Lincoln University

Alan Thacker Busby (December 12, 1895 – June 10, 1992) was an American animal scientist and educator who taught at two historically black universities from 1921 to 1966. He was the first African American to attend the University of Connecticut, enrolling in 1914 and earning his bachelor's degree with honors in 1918.

== Early life and education ==
Busby was born in Worcester, Massachusetts, on December 12, 1895, into one of the city's most prominent African-American families. His father George Alfred Busby (1857–1934), who had been born in Barbados and had migrated to the U.S. at the age of 17, was the owner of a tailoring and dry cleaning business and Worcester's first Black alderman, serving in 1903 and 1904. His mother was Jennie Cora Clough (1857–1928), Worcester's first Black schoolteacher and a 1878 alumna of Worcester Normal School.

Alan attended Worcester English High School from 1910 through June 1914. In 1914, he enrolled in Connecticut Agricultural College, and graduated with his Bachelor of Science degree in 1918. Busby told the Connecticut Campus that he chose the college because some of his high school friends were going there and because the University of Massachusetts Amherst was full. Being an out-of-state student, he was required to pay tuition fees of $290 a year. President Charles L. Beach found him jobs at the college dairy and horse farms, and Busby paid his way through college, as well as working as a resident assistant. Busby was an honors student and played football during his junior year. He also served as a news editor of the Connecticut Campus. Busby was the first African-American student to attend the college and was the only Black student during all four years of his studies there.

Graduating in May 1918, Busby immediately enlisted in the United States Army. Having served as an ROTC cadet while at the Connecticut Agricultural College, Busby served in the all-black 349th Field Artillery Regiment during World War I, attaining the rank of second lieutenant. He remained stationed in France for months after the war.

Following his military service, he worked briefly again at Storrs and then managed a farm in Paxton, Massachusetts.

== Academic career ==
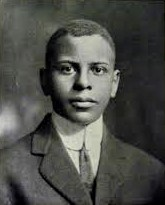
Busby 1914 yearbook photo

Busby's next stop was the Bordentown School in New Jersey, where he taught agriculture and science and ran the dairy farm from 1919 to 1921. He served as Professor of Animal Husbandry and livestock manager at Alcorn Agricultural and Mechanical College in Alcorn, Mississippi, from 1921 to 1943. In 1932, Busby took a one-year leave of absence from his position at Alcorn to earn a Master of Science degree from Cornell University. His master's thesis was entitled "A Study of Hereditary Influences on the Transmission of Butter-fat Test in Holstein-Friesian Cattle".

Moving on from Alcorn after more than twenty years of service there, Busby took a position as assistant professor of animal husbandry and dairying at Lincoln University in Jefferson City, Missouri. He worked at Lincoln from 1943 to 1966, when he retired. He took on additional responsibilities as counselor to student veterans between 1945 and 1969, continuing in this role even after his retirement. He was one of only three Lincoln faculty to appear on the membership roll of the American Association of University Professors in 1944. He earned a salary of US$4,680 in 1952 and $9,000 in 1966.

Busby was elected president of the South Central Athletic Conference in 1933 and again in 1943. In 1950, he founded the Lincoln University Federal Credit Union and served as the organization's president and treasurer. In retirement, he became president of the Men's Garden Club of Jefferson City.

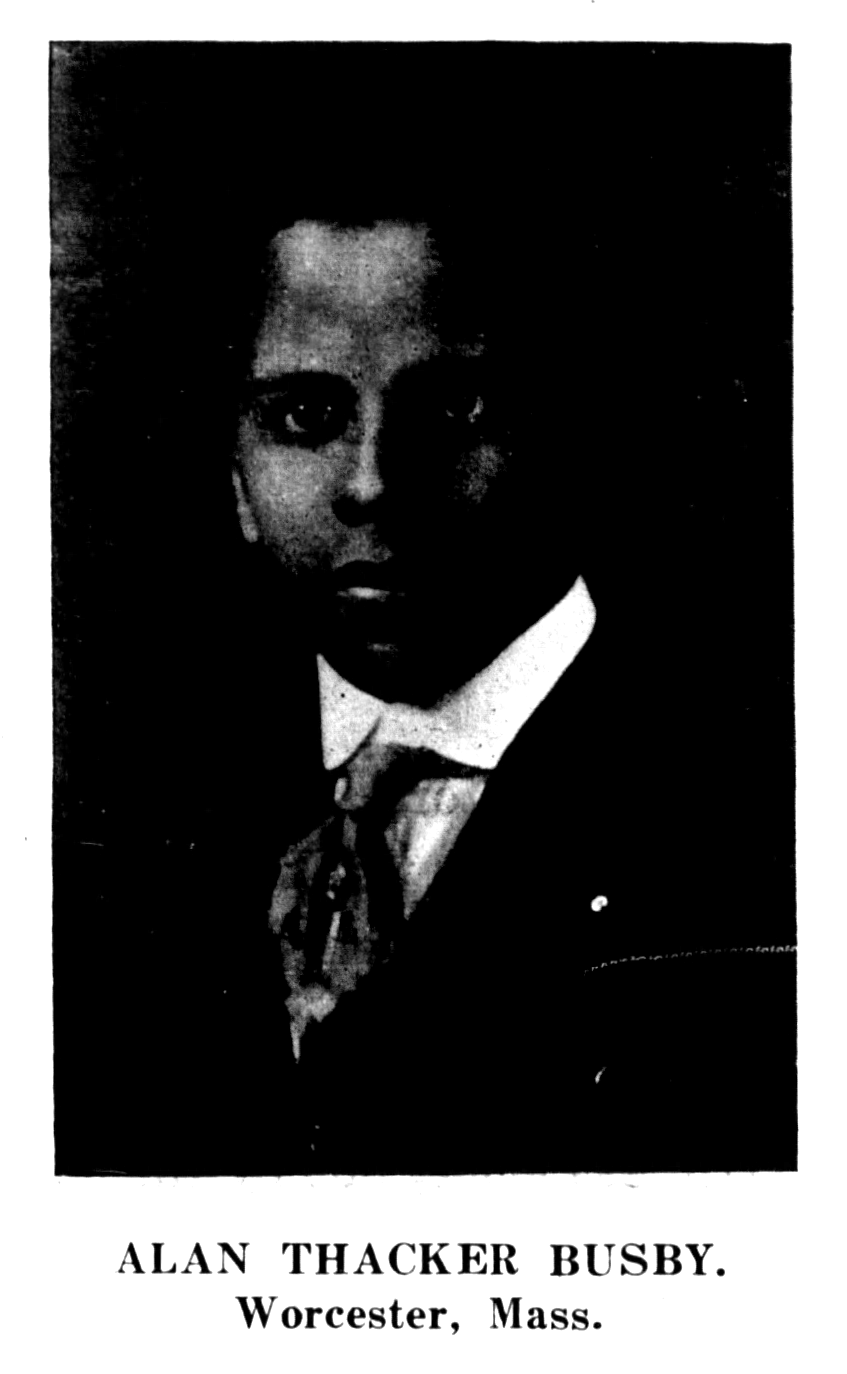
Busby in 1918

== Personal life ==
Busby's first wife was Edith Marie Oliver Busby (1894–1973), who was a schoolteacher in New Jersey, where the couple met and married. After her death, Busby remarried. He and Jacquelin Solomon Cook, an elementary education teacher for 30 years, were married on June 28, 1974. Busby and Jacquelin remained married until his death, on June 10, 1992, at the age of 96. He was interred at the Hawthorn Memorial Cemetery in Jefferson City, alongside his first wife Edith. Busby had no children. Alan Busby had one brother, George Clough Busby (born in 1897).

== Honors ==
Busby received the UConn Alumni Association's Distinguished Alumni Award in 1969. At the age of 95, Busby served as grand marshal of the 1990 homecoming parade at UConn.

The Alan T. Busby Suites, formerly the Charter Oak Suites, a residence hall at the University of Connecticut's main campus in Storrs, was named in his honor in 2006.

The Alan T. Busby Research Farm at Lincoln University, one of the largest certified organic research farms in the United States, was named in his honor.

The Alan T. Busby Scholarship is awarded by Missouri Credit Union in his memory.
