= Albert C. Yates =

American academic administrator

President of Colorado State University
- In office 1990–2003
- Preceded by: Philip E. Austin (Judson M. Harper interim)
- Succeeded by: Larry Edward Penley

Personal details
- Born: 1942 (age 83–84) Memphis, Tennessee
- Education: Memphis State University B.S. Indiana University Ph.D.

Albert C. Yates (born 1942) is a former American academic administrator.

== Career ==
Yates was born in Memphis, Tennessee in 1942. He served as the president of Colorado State University from 1990 to 2003. He earned his Ph.D. in Theoretical Chemical Physics from Indiana University Bloomington. Following postdoctoral work at the University of Southern California, he returned to Indiana University to join the faculty of the Department of Chemistry. In 1977, he was named Vice President and University Dean for Graduate Studies and Research at the University of Cincinnati. Dr. Yates served for nine years as Executive Vice President and Provost at Washington State University in Pullman immediately preceding accepting his position at CSU.
