= Walter Childs Wood =

American surgeon, politician, and university trustee (1864–1953)

Member of the Connecticut House of Representatives from New Canaan
- In office 1923–1931
- Preceded by: John H. Behre
- Succeeded by: Nellie Stewart; John L. Stevens

Personal details
- Born: August 4, 1864 Montreal, Quebec, Canada
- Died: November 23, 1953 (aged 89) New Canaan, Connecticut, U.S.
- Party: Republican
- Education: Columbia University (MD); Amherst College (BA)
- Occupation: Surgeon, dairy farmer, university trustee

Walter Childs Wood (1864–1953) was an American surgeon, state legislator, and long-time trustee of the University of Connecticut. He served in the Connecticut House of Representatives from 1923 to 1931 and was a member of the UConn Board of Trustees from 1922 to 1942. Wood's obituary in the Hartford Courant described him as "one of the state's leaders in the dairy and agricultural circles."

== Biography ==
Wood was born on August 4, 1864, while his family was temporarily living in Montreal. His parents were Andrew S. and Lois P. (Childs) Wood.

Wood went to school in Newbury and St. Johnsbury in Vermont. He completed his secondary education at Northampton High School and earned his bachelor's degree from Amherst College in 1886. He earned his doctorate of medicine at Columbia University's College of Physicians and Surgeons in 1889, specializing in surgery. Wood interned at Bellevue Hospital. He subsequently served as a staff member at St. Mary's Hospital in Brooklyn for ten years, chief surgeon at Brooklyn Hospital for fifteen years, and professor of surgery at Long Island University for seven years. During these two decades of practicing medicine, Wood authored fifteen pamphlets on surgical subjects, published in various medical journals.

In 1906, Wood purchased a property, which he called Brushwood Farms, in New Canaan, Connecticut. Suffering from exhaustion brought on by his intense schedule, Wood retired from medicine in 1911 and moved full-time to the New Canaan countryside, where he recovered his health.

The retired surgeon quickly became a dairy farmer and advocate for Connecticut agriculture, campaigning for the safety and quality of milk. He was instrumental in organizing the Fairfield County Farm Bureau and the Connecticut Farm Bureau Federation, which he served as president and vice president. He also served as director of the Connecticut Milk Producers Association and president of the Eastern States Farmers' Exchange.

In addition to his organizing and advocacy on behalf of Connecticut's farmers, Wood was active in local and state government. He served on the New Canaan town council, the town board of finance (1921–1942), and the Republican Party's town committee. Following his service on the town council, he was elected four consecutive two-year terms to represent New Canaan in the Connecticut General Assembly from 1923 to 1931.

Wood served nearly twenty years on the board of trustees of the University of Connecticut, from 1922 to 1942. In 1932, the university awarded him a certificate for "outstanding contributions to rural welfare in the state." As chair of the board, he clashed with President Charles C. McCracken, who resigned under pressure in 1935. Built in 1940 and located on Glenbrook Road in Storrs, UConn's Walter Childs Wood Hall was named in his honor. Originally serving as a men's residence hall, Wood Hall housed the history department and the office of institutional equity as of 2020.

Wood married Ellen Rich Davis (1864–1939) in Brooklyn on December 8, 1892. The couple had one child, Eleanor Woods Thomsen (1896–1978).

Wood died on November 23, 1953, at Brushwood Farms in New Canaan. He was 89 years old. He was interred at New Canaan's Lakeview Cemetery.
