= Jorgensen Center for the Performing Arts =

College performing arts venue in Connecticut

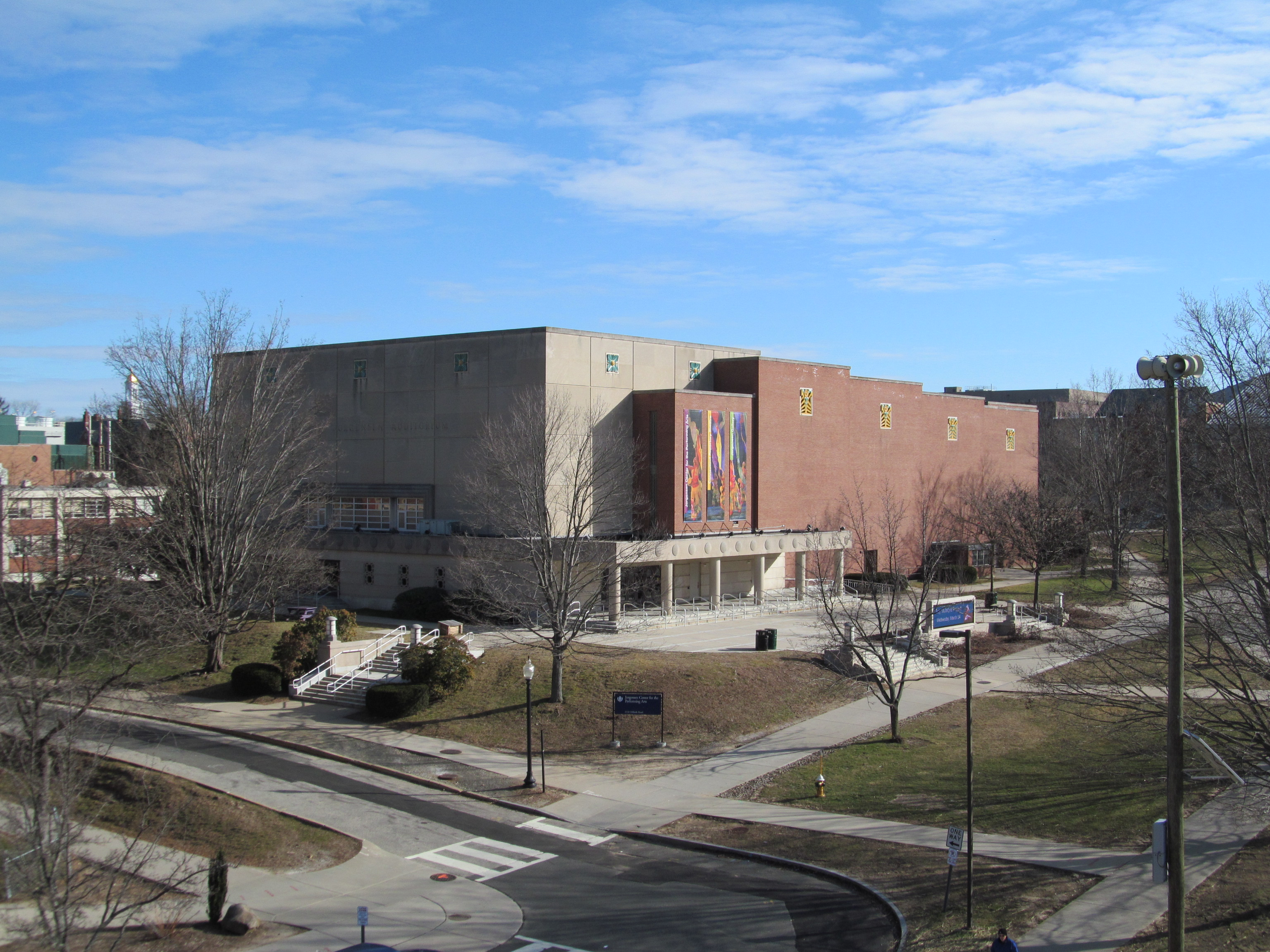

- Location within Connecticut
- Address: 2132 Hillside Road, Unit 3104; Storrs, Connecticut; United States
- Coordinates: 41.808491°N 72.256144°W
- Owner: University of Connecticut
- Capacity: 2,630
- Type: Performing arts center

Construction
- Opened: December 6, 1955

Website
- jorgensen.uconn.edu

The Jorgensen Center for the Performing Arts is a public performing arts venue located on the University of Connecticut's main campus in Storrs, Connecticut. Opened in December 1955 and seating over 2,600 people, the Center presents 25-30 artists and ensembles annually. The Center draws 65,000 to 70,000 visitors every year. Performances include classical and contemporary music and dance, children's theater, comedy, a cabaret series, lectures, and other cultural events and entertainment. Past performers include Duke Ellington, Itzhak Perlman, Kodo, Sweet Honey in the Rock, the Artemis Quartet, the American Ballet Theatre, the London Philharmonic, the Boston Pops, and the Royal Shakespeare Company. The Center also houses the Jorgensen Gallery, devoted mostly to regional artists, and the 485-seat Harriet S. Jorgensen Theatre, featuring performances by the Connecticut Repertory Theatre.

The Center was named for UConn president Albert N. Jorgensen, who oversaw construction. The Center's director is Rodney Rock.
