= Gentry (disambiguation) =

Gentry normally refers to a certain class of people.

Gentry may also refer to:

== Gentry in particular nations ==
- American gentry
- Landed gentry, in the United Kingdom
- Gentry (China)
- Polish landed gentry

== Places in the United States ==
- Gentry, Arkansas
- Gentry, Missouri
- Gentry County, Missouri
- Gentry, Texas

== Other uses ==
- Gentry (surname)
- Montgomery Gentry, an American country music duo
- Gentry Complex, a multipurpose arena in Nashville, Tennessee
- Bruce Gentry – Daredevil of the Skies, a 1949 American movie serial
- Bruce Gentry (comic strip)
- Merry Gentry, a series of books by Laurell K. Hamilton
- USS Gentry (DE-349), a United States naval vessel
- The Gentry, a thoroughbred racehorse from New Zealand
- The Gentry (band), an American electronic and alternative rock band
- The Gentrys, a 1960s American pop band
- Gentry Williams (born 2004), American football player
