= Homer D. Babbidge Jr. =

8th President of the University of Connecticut (1962–1972)

8th President of the University of Connecticut
- In office 1962–1972
- Preceded by: Albert N. Jorgensen
- Succeeded by: Edward V. Gant (acting)

Personal details
- Born: May 18, 1925 West Newton, Massachusetts, US
- Died: March 27, 1984 (aged 58) Farmington, Connecticut, US
- Spouse: Marcia Adkisson (m. 1956)
- Education: Yale University (B.A.); Yale University (M.A.); Yale University (Ph.D.)
- Profession: Historian, academic administrator

Homer Daniels Babbidge Jr. (May 18, 1925 – March 27, 1984) was an American historian who served as president of the University of Connecticut (1962–1972) and the Hartford Graduate Center (1976–1984). At age 37, he was the youngest state university president in the United States.

== Early life and education ==
Babbidge was born on May 18, 1925, in West Newton, Massachusetts, the son of a merchant sea captain and his wife. His family moved to New Haven when he was 4 years old and then to Amherst, New York, when he was 12. Babbidge graduated high school in Amherst. He became the first member of his family to go to college. He put himself through college by a combination of scholarships and part-time jobs, including bricklaying.

Babbidge earned three degrees in history from Yale University. He earned his bachelor's degree in 1945, his master's degree in 1948, and his doctorate in 1953. His doctoral dissertation examined the founding and early years of Swarthmore College in Pennsylvania.

While appreciative of football, Babbidge never played sports. He was blind in his left eye from a childhood accident.

== Career ==
Babbidge taught American studies at Yale and became director of financial aid. He then joined the U.S. Department of Health, Education and Welfare, where he served as special assistant to the commissioner of education (1955–1956), assistant to the secretary of the department (1957–1958), and finally as assistant U.S. commissioner of education and director of the Division of Higher Education (1959–1961). Babbidge received the department’s Distinguished Service Medal in 1961 before he moved to become vice president of the American Council on Education (1961–1962). The U.S. Junior Chamber named him one of the “ten outstanding young men of the nation” because of his work administering the National Defense Education Act.

Babbidge and his wife, Marcia Adkisson, invented the political board game Convention, which John F. Kennedy played during his 1960 presidential campaign.

=== President of the University of Connecticut ===
Babbidge presided over major growth at UConn. Student enrollment rose from 11,877 in 1962 to 20,514 in 1972, while graduate student enrollment more than doubled from 1720 to 4225 over the same period. The number of doctoral degrees awarded more than tripled. The library grew from 270,000 volumes to 1.15 million, becoming one of only fifty-nine of the nation’s 2,200 four-year colleges and universities that could claim such resources. In New England, only Harvard, Yale, Brown, Dartmouth, and MIT had larger collections by the end of his tenure.

Babbidge established new dental and medical schools, and began construction on an $85 million complex that became the University of Connecticut Health Center in Farmington. Under his leadership, the university opened a campus at Avery Point in Groton, launched more than a dozen academic departments and programs, and established the Honors Program, the UConn Foundation, and the William Benton Museum of Art. Babbidge also raised faculty salaries, thereby making UConn more competitive in attracting talent.

The latter half of Babbidge's tenure saw campus roiled by student protests against the Vietnam War, racism, and sexism. Babbidge himself remained generally popular with students and faculty. However, in 1970, Connecticut elected a fiscally conservative governor, Thomas Meskill, whose attitude toward UConn "bordered on antagonism," according to historian Bruce M. Stave.

Babbidge announced his resignation on October 1, 1971, to be effective one year from that date. The University Senate and more than 7,000 students signed a petition asking him to stay on.

After a long and troubled search for Babbidge's successor, during which Provost Edward V. Gant served as acting president, Glenn Ferguson was named president and took office in 1973.

=== After UConn ===
Upon his resignation from UConn's presidency in 1972, Babbidge became master of Timothy Dwight College at Yale University, where he remained for four years. He entered the race for the 1974 Democratic gubernatorial nomination, dropping out in deference to Ella Grasso. In 1976 he became president of the Hartford Graduate Center and served in that position until his death.

Babbidge was active in the state history community. He wrote and narrated a documentary film series called ''Connecticut Heritage" for Connecticut Public Television. In 1977, the series won a gold medal at the New York Film Festival and an award from the Corporation for Public Broadcasting. In 1983 he co-produced and narrated a documentary about Nantucket called "Off-Season." That same year, he was appointed chair of the board for the Connecticut Public Television Corporation.

In addition to writing and teaching a seminar on higher education administration while at UConn, Babbidge taught a non-credit weekend course on the history and making of stone walls, using a farm he owned in the neighboring town of Coventry to give his students hands-on experience as well as examples of several historical varieties of New England wall building. In 1985, the Association for the Study of Connecticut History established the Homer D. Babbidge Jr. Award for best book on Connecticut history or service to the Connecticut history community.

Babbidge collected corkscrews, and with a British physician, Bernard Watney, he wrote in 1981 an authoritative work on the subject, Corkscrews for Collectors.

== Death ==
Babbidge died of cancer at UConn's medical center in Farmington on March 27, 1984. He was 58 years old. He was survived by his wife, Marcia, and children Aimee, Sandra, and Alexander.

Shortly after his death, the UConn board of trustees re-named the Nathan Hale Library in his honor.

Babbidge was a member of the Acorn Club, elected in 1973.

== See also ==
- Homer D. Babbidge Library

Academic offices
Preceded by Albert N. Jorgensen	8th President of the University of Connecticut; 1962–1972	Succeeded by Edward V. Gant
