= George A. Works =

5th president of the University of Connecticut

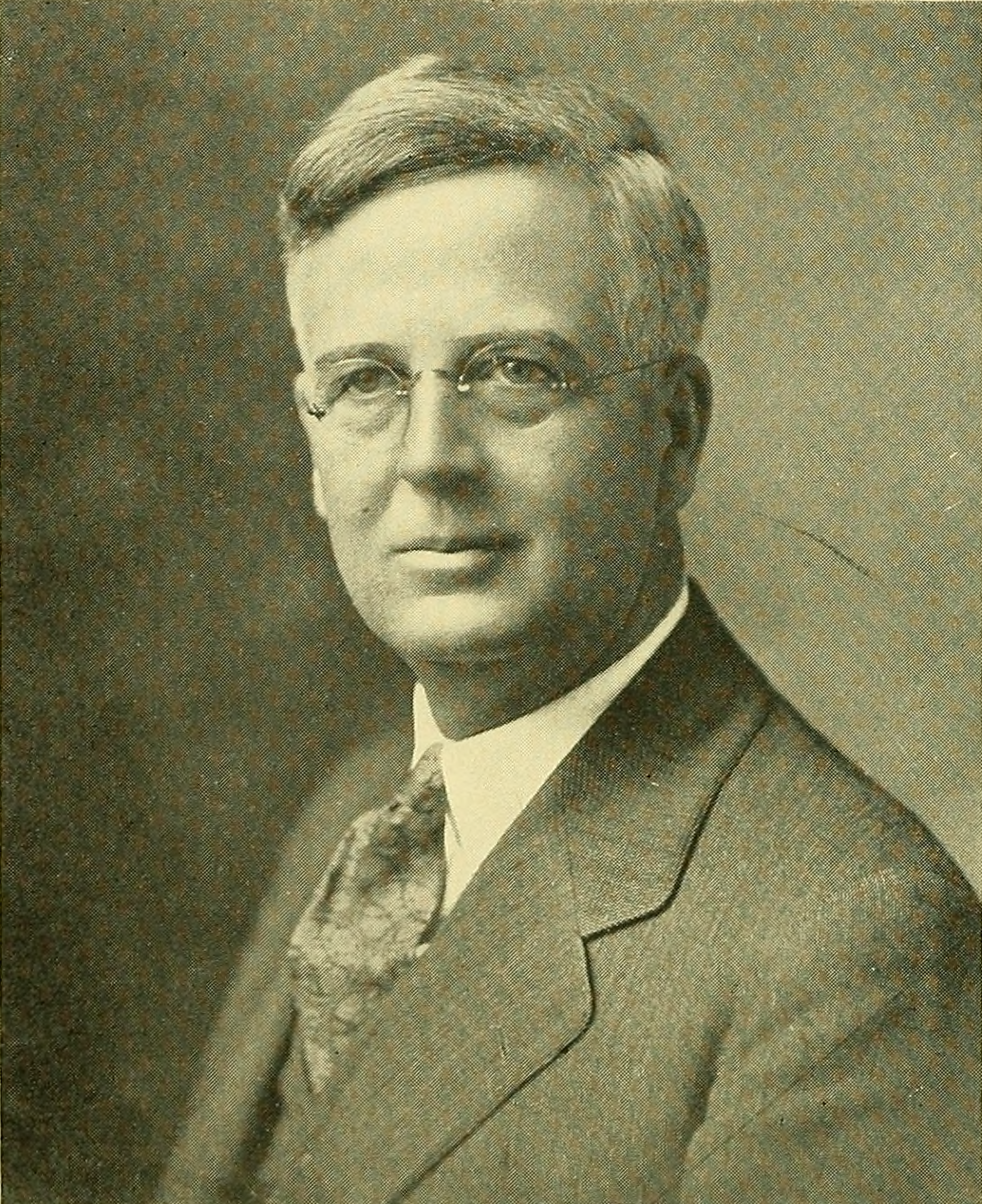

5th President of the University of Connecticut
- In office July 1, 1929 – July 1, 1930
- Preceded by: Charles L. Beach
- Succeeded by: Charles C. McCracken

Personal details
- Born: May 14, 1877 Lincoln, Eau Claire County, Wisconsin, US
- Died: December 13, 1957 (aged 80) Ridgewood, New Jersey, US
- Education: University of Wisconsin–Madison (B.A.); Harvard University (Ph.D.)
- Profession: Academic administration

George Alan Works (1877–1957) was an American academic administrator who served as the fifth president of the University of Connecticut (then Connecticut Agricultural College) from 1929 to 1930. His papers are held in the university archives at the Dodd Research Center.

== Biography ==
Prior to assuming the UConn presidency on July 1, 1929, Works had served as dean of the University of Chicago Graduate Library School (1927–1929), professor of rural education in the Cornell University College of Agriculture (1914–1927), instructor and professor of rural education at the University of Wisconsin–Madison (1911–1914), and Wisconsin school superintendent prior to 1911.

Works received a bachelor's degree from the University of Wisconsin in 1904 and a doctorate in education from the Harvard Graduate School of Education in 1925. He was a member of the National Society for Vocational Education, the American Association for the Advancement of Science, the American Association of University Professors, and Phi Beta Kappa.

== UConn presidency ==
Historian Bruce M. Stave characterized Works as "a mover and a shaker, a person of very high standards with academic experience at quality institutions." Works immediately shook up the traditional culture at Storrs, advocating for greater emphasis on the liberal arts, demanding improvements to credentialing and professional development among the faculty, standardizing procedures, and seeking to unify the college, the agricultural experiment station, and the extension service, which had traditionally functioned independently. Works also increased investment in library resources and laboratory facilities to support an unsuccessful bid for accreditation from the Association of American Universities.

Works abruptly resigned effective July 1, 1930, and returned to the University of Chicago to chair its department of higher education. He blamed political barriers for impeding his vision for growth, with the State Board of Finance and Control resisting the move toward a more comprehensive curriculum. Works' resignation letter declared that "the trustees of the college should have a greater measure of autonomy in determining fiscal policies, which in turn influence educational policies, than the present financial organization of the state government gives them."

Works was succeeded as president by Charles C. McCracken, who advanced Works' vision for a comprehensive college.

Academic offices
Preceded by Charles L. Beach	5th President of the University of Connecticut; 1929-1930	Succeeded by Charles C. McCracken
