= Charles L. Beach =

4th President of the University of Connecticut (1908–1928)

Charles Lewis Beach
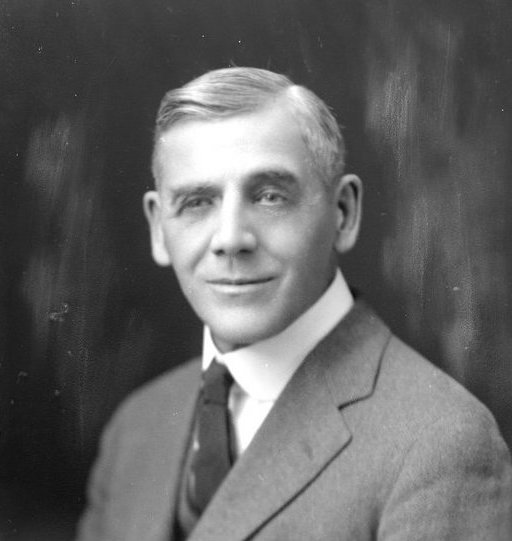

4th President of the University of Connecticut
- In office 1908–1928
- Preceded by: Edwin O. Smith
- Succeeded by: Charles B. Gentry

Personal details
- Born: April 6, 1866 Whitewater, Wisconsin
- Died: September 15, 1933 (aged 67) Storrs, Connecticut
- Spouse: Louise Crombie Beach
- Education: University of Wisconsin–Madison (B.A./B.S.)
- Profession: Professor of dairy science, academic administrator, agricultural educator

Charles Lewis Beach (April 6, 1866 — September 15, 1933) was an American agricultural educator who served as the 4th president of Connecticut Agricultural College, now the University of Connecticut, from 1908 to 1928. Beach played a pivotal role in UConn's development. He also laid the foundations for the future William Benton Museum of Art. Beach is one of only five presidents to hold the honorary title of President Emeritus.

== Early life and education ==
Beach was born on April 6, 1866, in Whitewater, Wisconsin. His father was a member of the University of Wisconsin's board of regents. He graduated from the University of Wisconsin–Madison with dual B.A. and B.S. degrees in 1886. He worked ten years in the milling business before becoming an instructor in dairy husbandry at the Connecticut Agricultural College in 1896. Popular with students and colleagues, he made significant contributions to the field of dairy science. After ten years at Connecticut, he became professor of dairy husbandry at the University of Vermont in 1906.

== Presidency ==
Beach was appointed president following the resignation of Rufus W. Stimson. He assumed his duties on September 15, 1908, taking over from acting president Edwin O. Smith, who had served since April. Contemporaries characterized Beach as a benevolent, firm, persevering administrator.

=== Academics ===
When Beach started as president, 167 students (including 20 women) were enrolled and 36 faculty employed at Connecticut Agricultural College. Two decades later, around 500 students (including 160 women) were enrolled and 80 faculty worked there. Beach hired Albert Francis Blakeslee, George Safford Torrey, Albert Waugh, M. Estella Sprague, and other prominent faculty and administrators. Beach also strengthened academic standards, requiring students to have a high school diploma for admission and establishing the college's first four-year bachelor's degree program in 1914. He increased course offerings in the liberal arts while remaining true to the college's roots in agricultural education. In addition to bolstering both the number and the proportion of women students, Beach graduated the college's first African American student, Alan T. Busby, in 1918.

=== Physical plant ===
Beach inherited a deteriorating physical plant, unfurnished classrooms, overcrowded dormitories, and sewage and water problems. He lobbied the Connecticut General Assembly year after year for higher annual appropriations and capital investments, with considerable success. In 1911, the state appropriated $178,000 to build a new men's dormitory, a poultry school building, a dining hall, and various barns and cottages. In 1913, another $60,000 was appropriated to construct an auditorium and the Hawley Armory building, which provided long-awaited facilities for athletics.

The campus transformed from frame buildings to brick-and-mortar. During the 1920s, Beach oversaw the construction of a women's dormitory (Holcomb Hall, 1921), a dining hall ("The Beanery," 1920, now the site of the Benton Museum), a men's dormitory (William H. Hall Building, 1927), and many smaller projects. Capital investments culminated in the construction, beginning in 1927, of a brick classroom, laboratory, and administration building named Beach Hall in the president's honor. Opened in 1929, Beach Hall cost $343,000 to build. It was renovated in the 1970s.

Under Beach, the value of the college rose from $358,000 in 1908 to $3,356,574 in 1928. Land holdings rose from 300 to 1200 acres. The number of substantial buildings on campus doubled.

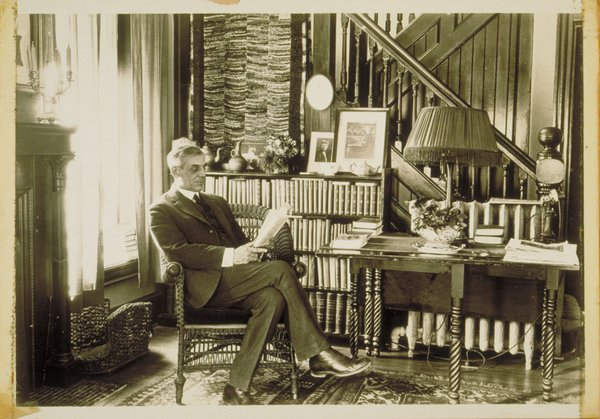
Charles Lewis Beach in 1924

=== Art collection ===
Beach was an avid art collector from 1924 until his death. In 1925 he commissioned Ellen Emmet Rand to paint a posthumous portrait of his wife from photographs. In 1929 he established the Louise Crombie Beach Foundation in honor of his deceased wife and endowed it with funds to purchase additional works of future for the college. The Beach Collection was bequeathed to the college in his will and was particularly strong in American impressionists. Pieces were hung in various campus buildings and eventually formed the basis for the William Benton Museum of Art, which opened in 1967.

The Charles Lewis Beach Society was established to honor donors who make planned gifts to UConn.

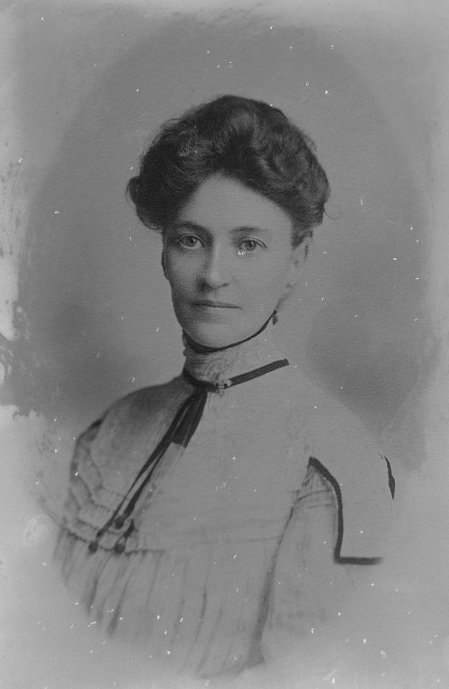
Louise Crombie Beach

== Later life ==
Amid declining health (heart problems and a thyroid condition), Beach retired as president on July 31, 1928, twenty years after assuming the presidency.

During retirement, Beach continued to live in a cottage on campus but avoided any role in administration or instruction. He adopted a leisurely lifestyle, hosting dinner parties, traveling around the region to visit exhibits and purchase art, visiting friends, reading, and going on walks. Beach suffered a cerebral hemorrhage on September 1, 1933, and died on September 15, 1933, at age 67.

== Family ==
Beach married Wisconsin native Louise Crombie Beach (1868–1924) in 1896, just before arriving in Storrs. They had a happy marriage, with observers frequently commenting on their teasing, affectionate relationship. The Beaches had one child who died in infancy. When his wife died in 1924, Charles Beach was devastated. His interest in art was inspired by his wife, as he began purchasing art to please her during her last illness.

Academic offices
Preceded by Edwin O. Smith	4th President of the University of Connecticut; 1908-1928	Succeeded by Charles B. Gentry
