= Edward V. Gant =

Three-time acting president of the University of Connecticut

Acting President of the University of Connecticut
- In office July–October 1969
- In office 1972–1973
- In office 1978–1979

Personal details
- Born: 1918 Ethridge, Tennessee
- Died: July 4, 1985 (aged 66–67) Willimantic, Connecticut
- Education: Vanderbilt University; California Institute of Technology
- Profession: Academic administration Civil engineering

Edward Victor Gant (1918 – July 4, 1985) was an American civil engineering professor and academic administrator who served as provost (1965–1974) and three-time acting president of the University of Connecticut (July–October 1969; 1972–1973; 1978–1979).

Born in Ethridge, Tennessee, Gant earned a bachelor's degree from Vanderbilt University in 1939 and a master's degree in 1940 from the California Institute of Technology. He joined UConn in 1942 and was promoted to full professor of civil engineering in 1947.

From 1957 through 1974, Gant held various positions, including assistant dean and acting dean of the School of Engineering, acting head of the civil engineering department, and provost and academic vice president. He stepped down as provost in 1974 to return to full-time teaching. He worked at UConn for a total of forty-three years. In addition to these leadership roles, Gant chaired the Mansfield Board of Education from 1949 to 1953.

The Edward V. Gant Building, a 285,000-square-foot (26,500 m^{2}) science building on UConn's main campus in Storrs, is named in his honor. The Edward Victor Gant Scholarship for graduate and undergraduate students was established in his honor.

Gant was married to Margaret Regen Gant, and they had two children. He died in 1985.
