= The Gentry (band) =

American rock band

- Origin: Portland, Oregon, United States
- Genres: Electronic, alternative, rock
- Years active: 2003-present
- Members: Gino Mari; Andrew "AC" Carreon; Jeremy Dan; Marcus V. Warner
- Past members: Steve Taylor

The Gentry is an American band from Portland, Oregon, formed in 2003 by DJ/producer Gino Mari. The band is most commonly classified in the electronic, alternative rock and rock music genres.

== History ==
=== 2003-2007: the early years ===
The Gentry released its first single "The Demons // Tongue In Chic" in 2004, followed by another single "We Want More" in 2005. In 2006, The Gentry released "Sweet Gossip TV", an 8-song EP made up of new material and songs from the band's first two singles. Willamette Week wrote ""Frontman Gino Mari's voice adds a sexiness that all those glam-rock bands brought us. Their flamboyant sound is quite appealing." The following year, in 2007, The Gentry released a new single, "The Latent Stranger". Portland's Local Cut wrote, “Driven by a New Waver’s sensibility for electronic hooks and spiked with ragged guitar licks covered in grime and Pop Rocks, the quartet’s latest packs a wallop.” In 2008 Portland Pop Tomorrow wrote "The Gentry cut a divergent path across genres and movements. Pieces of glam, punk, new wave, electro, soul, psychedelia, industrial, hip hop and rock & roll are sewn together with a pop sense of pomp and precision. The Gentry is a well-bred machine of musical brilliance. In an intricate combination, all five members provide an essential role in making the band a magnificent electrical symphony”.

=== 2009-2014: touring, "Sex By The Unit" ===
In 2009 the band put out "Sex By The Unit", a 7-song EP made up of new material and toured the U.S. in support of the release. The Portland Tribune wrote "The Gentry manages to easily bridge the gap between experimental and accessible." in a review of one of their shows that year. The Gentry has performed with The Presets, Nitzer Ebb, Freezepop, Logan Lynn, Chi Chi LaRue, Frenchie Davis, Covenant, Apoptygma Berzerk, Birthday Massacre and many others. In 2012 The Gentry announced on their social media that they were working on a new record, tentatively set for a 2014 release.

=== Collaboration with Logan Lynn ===
The band toured in support of The Dandy Warhols protégé Logan Lynn from 2009 to 2010. As a launching-pad project for The Country Club studios, Gino Mari produced two singles for Lynn, as well as Logan Lynn's hit record "Tramp Stamps and Birthmarks" from 2012. In July 2013 Gino Mari again toured with Logan Lynn and is featured on Lynn's "Live From Seattle" album, released in August 2013. That same month, Lynn released a cover of We Can't Stop by Miley Cyrus which was co-written and produced by Mari. In September 2014, Gino Mari produced another two-song single for Logan Lynn titled "We Will Overcome", in advance of a full-length album “ADIEU.” which was released in September 2016.

=== The Country Club Studios ===
In 2011 Gino Mari launched The Country Club recording studios in Hillsboro, Oregon. Logan Lynn's "Tramp Stamps and Birthmarks" was the first major album release out of the studio in December 2012.
