= Ron Gentry =

American politician (born 1943)

Member of the New Mexico House of Representatives from the 7th district
- In office 1992–1998
- Succeeded by: P. Vickers

Personal details
- Born: 1943 (age 82–83) Belen, New Mexico, U.S.
- Party: Democratic
- Education: Ventura College

Ron Gentry (born 1943) is an American politician. He served as a Democratic member for the 7th district of the New Mexico House of Representatives.

Born in Belen, New Mexico, Gentry attended Ventura College. In 1992, he was elected to represent the 7th district of the New Mexico House of Representatives. He served until 1998, when he was succeeded by P. Vickers.

In 2019, Gentry bought a building in Rio Communities, New Mexico, intending to donate it for use as a healthcare facility.
