= Neag School of Education =

Unite of the University of Connecticut, US

Coordinates: 41.8061°N 72.2516°W

University of Connecticut Neag School of Education
- Type: Public
- Established: 1940
- Parent institution: University of Connecticut
- Dean: Jason Irizarry
- Academic staff: 86 faculty
- Students: 1,195 students
- Location: Storrs, Mansfield, Connecticut, United States
- Parent Endowment: $34.7 million

The University of Connecticut (UConn) Neag School of Education offers undergraduate and graduate degrees in education, sport management, and leadership across four campuses, with the main campus located in Storrs, Connecticut. The Storrs location is the main UConn campus and is home to the Renzulli Center for Gifted Education and Talent Development, and additional locations are in Hartford, Waterbury, Stamford, and Groton. It is consistently ranked among the top public graduate schools of education in the nation by U.S. News and World Report. The school's research and teaching programs have been funded by a wide number of institutions, such as the National Science Foundation and the Department of Education.

== History ==
The Neag School of Education was founded in 1940 when the Connecticut Agricultural College became the University of Connecticut. It is based in the Charles B. Gentry Building, which was built in 1960 in honor of the former director of the Division of Teacher Training and University President.

In 1958, the School of Education established the first high school in the town of Mansfield, E. O. Smith High School, as a laboratory school for teacher training and education research. The high school, which lies adjacent to campus, was operated by the University of Connecticut until 1987, when it became the regional public high school. E.O. Smith has maintained an Agricultural Science education program since its time as a part of UConn, and junior and senior high school students may take classes for credit on UConn's campus.

In 1999, the School of Education was renamed after Ray Neag, a businessman and graduate of UConn. Neag was co-Vice Chairman of Arrow International, Inc., a leading manufacturer of medical devices. The donation of $21 million is the largest gift given to an education school in the nation. In 2000, the building underwent major reconstruction, and a 20,000-square-foot wing was added to the west side of the building.

The former deans of the School of Education are:

- 1919–1921 Theodore Eaton
- 1921–1940 Charles B. Gentry
- 1940–1948 P. Roy Brammell
- 1948–1949 William Gruhn (acting)
- 1949–1960 P. Roy Brammell
- 1960–1961 C.A. Weber (acting)
- 1961–1964 F. Robert Paulsen
- 1964–1965 Glenn C. Atkyns (acting)
- 1965–1972 William H. Roe
- 1972–1975 Harry J. Hartley
- 1975–1987 Mark R. Shibles
- 1987–1988 David N. Camaione (acting)
- 1988–1996 Charles W. Case
- 1996–1997 Judith A. Meagher (acting)
- 1997–2009 Richard L. Schwab
- 2009–2014 Thomas C. DeFranco
- 2014–2016 Richard L. Schwab
- 2016–2021 Gladis Kersaint
- 2021-present Jason Irizarry

== Academics ==
=== Academic Areas ===
The Neag School of Education is home to three departments (Department of Curriculum & Instruction, Department of Educational Leadership, Department of Educational Psychology) and an Office of Teacher Education.

==== Department of Curriculum and Instruction ====
The Department of Curriculum and Instruction offers bachelor's, master's, and doctorate programs in curriculum and instruction for both pre-service and in-service educators. The program does not offer a teacher credential, which is only offered through the Teacher Certification Program for College Graduates (TCPCG) program (see Teacher Education). The undergraduate programs allow students to gain core competencies in teaching at all levels of education. The graduate programs allow for more specialized knowledge in a content area (math, science, or social studies) to prepare for additional certification later on. Doctoral programs allow students to pursue positions as professors or researchers in a wide array of settings. The research unit affiliated with the department is the Reading and Language Arts Center, which facilitates the improvement of literacy instruction.

==== Department of Educational Leadership ====
The Department of Educational Leadership connects theory, practice, and policy in a variety of academic programs, including educational leadership, education policy, executive leadership, and more. The program is also home to the university's Sport Management program, offering undergraduate, master's, and doctoral degrees.

The department houses UConn's Center for Education Policy Analysis, Research, and Evaluation (CEPARE), which aims to inform educational leaders and policymakers on issues related to the development, implementation and consequences of education policies. CEPARE examines policies through multiple perspectives, paying particular attention to the impact of policies on social justice and educational equity across P-20 educational settings.

==== Department of Educational Psychology ====
The Department of Educational Psychology is one of the most research-productive departments at the university. It offers master's and doctorate degrees in educational psychology with concentrations in Counselor Education; Giftedness, Creativity, and Talent Development; Learning Sciences; Research Methods, Measurement and Evaluation; School Psychology; and Special Education. The special education programs are currently ranked as No. 18 in the nation by U.S. News and World Report.

The department is home to the Renzulli Center for Creativity, Gifted Education, and Talent Development, one of the leading centers in the world in the area of gifted education and talent development. The Renzulli Center also houses the nation's only federally funded research center in gifted education, the National Center for Research on Gifted Education (NCRGE). In addition to the Renzulli Center, the Department of Educational Psychology is also home to or affiliated with the Center for Behavioral Education and Research (CBER); the UConn Center for Excellence in Developmental Disabilities Education, Research and Service (UCEDD); the UConn Collaboratory on School and Child Health (CSCH); and the OSEP Center on Positive Behavioral Interventions and Supports (PBIS).

==== Office of Teacher Education ====
The Office of Teacher Education offers two programs. First, the Teacher Certification Program for College Graduates (TCPCG) is a 10-month, full-time, accelerated program that allows students to earn a Connecticut Teacher Certification and an MA in Curriculum and Instruction or an MA in Educational Psychology. Students are required to complete coursework in addition to passing all relevant PRAXIS II examinations, as required by the state.

Second, the Integrated Bachelor’s/Master’s (IB/M) Program in Teacher Education is a five-year, advanced program for undergraduates at UConn Storrs. Graduates of the program receive a Bachelor of Science in education, and a Master of Arts in Curriculum and Instruction or a Master of Arts in Educational Psychology (Special Education). The accelerated track of the program allows students to gain exposure to a number of areas within five years. The IB/M program began in 1987 from conversations between the Holmes Group, John Goodlad, and the National Network for Educational Renewal. The IB/M program offers courses of study in the following areas: Elementary Education (Grades PK–6), Secondary Education (Grades 4–12), Comprehensive Special Education (PK–12), and Music Education (PK–12). The program is built upon 6 key tenets which emphasize the common core of pedagogical knowledge required for all education majors, as well as clinical experience in a variety of environments. In the first two years of the program, students complete a well-rounded liberal arts plan of study. In their junior year, students begin to take courses designed to help them learn about students as learners. In the senior year of the program, students gain more specific pedagogical knowledge. And, in the master's year, students gain clinical experience through an internship.

=== Accreditation & Rankings ===
The Neag School of Education is accredited by the Council for the Accreditation of Educator Preparation (CAEP). This CAEP accreditation covers initial teacher preparation programs (Agriculture Education [TCPCG], Elementary Education [IB/M], and English, History/Social Studies, Mathematics, Science, Special Education, and World Languages [IB/M and TCPCG]) and advanced educator preparation programs (Administrator Preparation, Executive Leadership, Reading and Language Arts, and School Psychology) at the University of Connecticut’s main campus in Storrs, Conn., and regional campuses. The Neag School of Education programs have received continuing approval from the Connecticut State Board of Education until March 31, 2030.

Specific programs at the Neag School also carry programmatic accreditation:

- Counselor Education and Counseling Psychology: the M.A. program in Counselor Education is accredited by the Council for Accreditation of Counseling and Related Educational Programs (CACREP)
- Music Education: The University of Connecticut is a National Association of Schools of Music (NASM)-accredited institution.
- School Psychology: The Ph.D. program in School Psychology is accredited by the American Psychological Association.
- School Psychology: The M.A./sixth-year program in School Psychology is approved by the National Association of School Psychologists (NASP).
- Special Education Transition to Adulthood Certificate (not licensure): The online graduate certificate program in Special Education Transition to Adulthood is accredited through the Council for Exceptional Children (CEC).

In three specialty programs (Special Education, Educational Administration, and Curriculum and Instruction), the Neag School of Education is recognized as among the top in the nation, according to U.S. News and World Report.

Considered a Public Ivy, the main campus of the University of Connecticut is located in Storrs and is considered one of the leading research universities in the United States.

== Research Centers ==
The Neag School of Education promotes interdisciplinary research and education. It houses or is affiliated with the following research centers at the University of Connecticut:

- Research Centers Center for Behavioral Education and Research (CBER)
- Center for Education Policy Analysis, Research, and Evaluation (CEPARE)
- UConn Center for Excellence in Developmental Disabilities Education, Research and Service (UCEDD)
- UConn Collaboratory on School and Child Health (CSCH)
- Collaborative on Postsecondary Education and Disability (CPED)
- OSEP Center on Positive Behavioral Interventions and Supports (PBIS)
- Reading and Language Arts Center
- Renzulli Center for Creativity, Gifted Education, and Talent Development

It is also affiliated with the National Center for Research on Gifted Education (NCGRE), which is funded by the Department of Education.

== See also ==
- University of Connecticut School of Business
- University of Connecticut School of Dental Medicine
- University of Connecticut School of Engineering
- University of Connecticut School of Law
- University of Connecticut School of Medicine
