= Jaime Homero Arjona =

American linguist and educator (1906–1967)

- Born: December 23, 1906; Ponce, Puerto Rico
- Died: January 25, 1967 (aged 60); Mansfield, Connecticut
- Occupations: Professor of Romance & Classical Languages
- Employer: University of Connecticut

Academic background
- Education: University of Minnesota; Brown University

Jaime Homero Arjona (1906–1967) was Professor of Romance and Classical Languages at the University of Connecticut (1932–1967), serving as chair of the Department of Foreign Languages for eighteen years (1946–1964). Constructed in 1959 and dedicated in 1968, the Jaime Homero Arjona Building in Storrs was named in his honor. The Arjona Building houses faculty offices and classrooms in the humanities and prior to 1968 was known as the Humanities Building.

Born in Ponce, Puerto Rico, in 1906, Arjona received his bachelor's degree from the University of Minnesota and his master's and doctoral degrees from Brown University. He taught at Brown University before joining UConn in 1932. He also taught Spanish at Hartford College for Women, and his photograph appears with other faculty in the college's 1944 yearbook.

During his long tenure as the University of Connecticut's Foreign Languages Department chair, Arjona was instrumental in growing the department from six full-time instructors in 1946 to thirty full-time faculty at the Storrs campus alone by 1964. Under his leadership, the department launched doctoral programs in French, German, and Spanish.

Arjona was an expert on Spanish playwright and poet Lope de Vega and identified several new works by de Vega using a statistical text analysis method that Arjona devised. He authored or coauthored several Spanish translations, textbooks, and other publications. He was also a member of Phi Kappa Phi, the Modern Language Association, the American Association of Teachers of Spanish and Portuguese, and the Connecticut Academy of Arts and Sciences.

Arjona stepped down as department chair following a heart attack in 1964. He died of a second heart attack in 1967 and was interred at Storrs Cemetery, in Storrs, Connecticut on a hill overlooking the campus. He was survived by his wife, Olga Marie Rodalviez Arjona, formerly of Providence, and their two children.
