= George Safford Torrey =

American botanist and educator (1891-1977)

- Born: March 14, 1891; Boston, Massachusetts
- Died: August 19, 1977 (aged 86); Mansfield, Connecticut
- Education: Harvard University
- Scientific career
- Fields: Botany
- Workplaces: University of Connecticut
- Author abbrev. (botany): G.S.Torr.

George Safford Torrey (1891 – 1977) was an American botanist who taught at the University of Connecticut for forty-one years (1915-1956) and chaired the botany department for twenty-four of those years (1929-1953). Dedicated in 1980, UConn's George Safford Torrey Life Sciences Building was named in his honor. So is the George Safford Torrey Herbarium.

Born in 1891 in Dorchester, Boston, Torrey attended Phillips Andover Academy, graduating in 1909. He earned his Bachelor of Arts degree from Harvard College in 1913, a Master of Arts in botany from Harvard University in 1915, and a diplome d'Etudes Superieures from the University of Paris in 1919. After a stint at the Department of Agriculture in Newfoundland, Torrey was hired in 1915 as one of the first instructors of botany at Connecticut Agriculture College, later the University of Connecticut. He served fourteen months in the U.S. Army during World War I (May 1918 to July 1919) and was deployed to Europe, though he did not see combat. Discharged with the rank of private first class, Torrey returned to Connecticut Agricultural College, where he received tenure in 1928 and was appointed chair of the botany department a year later. He retired in 1956.

Torrey built the college herbarium, acquiring tens of thousands of plants through donation and purchase. During his tenure at UConn, he served more than a decade on the Scholastic Standing Committee, a three-year term on the national council of the American Association of University Professors, and as marshal at graduation ceremonies. He also spearheaded a successful campaign to form a UConn chapter of Phi Beta Kappa in 1953 and served as its first president. Torrey was a member of Phi Beta Kappa, Sigma XI, and the Connecticut Academy of Arts and Sciences. Beyond his academic duties, he played the organ and carillon at the Storrs Congregational Church, of which he was a lifelong congregant, until he became too frail to climb the stairs. He also played the bassoon in the Eastern Connecticut Symphony Orchestra and the carillon at Trinity College.

Torrey died of heart disease in 1977. He was survived by his wife, Elizabeth Wolcott Tapley, and their four children.

Torrey's papers are held at the University of Connecticut's Archives and Special Collections.

The standard author abbreviation G.S.Torr. is used to indicate this person as the author when citing a botanical name.
