= Tyson Gentry =

American college football player and author (born 1985)

- Born: July 20, 1985 (age 41)
- Occupations: Author, motivational speaker, philanthropist, consultant
- Website: www.tysongentry.com

Tyson Gentry (born July 20, 1985) is an American author, motivational speaker, philanthropist, and advocate for individuals and families affected by spinal cord injuries. Gentry was a former football player for The Ohio State Buckeyes. His career was cut short after sustaining a spinal cord injury during a spring scrimmage in 2006.

== College career and education ==
Gentry was recruited as a preferred walk-on punter in 2004 but also started playing scout team wide receiver almost immediately. In the spring of his sophomore year, he was asked to move to receiver.

On April 14, 2006, during a team scrimmage, Gentry sustained a cervical spinal cord injury at the C-4 level after being tackled by teammate, Kurt Coleman. The injury resulted in the loss of all sensation and movement below his shoulders. Gentry underwent two surgeries to stabilize and fuse his damaged vertebra. After two months of intensive physical and occupational therapy, Gentry regained limited strength in his biceps and partial sensation in his extremities.

Despite his injury, Gentry resumed his studies the following fall and remained involved with the football program through his senior season in 2008. He graduated with his bachelor's degree in speech and hearing science in 2009. In 2014, Gentry earned his master's degree in rehabilitation counseling from the State University of New York at Buffalo.

== Philanthropy ==
In 2014, Gentry and his wife, Megan, started New Perspective Foundation, which seeks to serve families affected by spinal cord injuries. The main purpose is to provide financial support for travel expenses, so families can be at the hospital bedside of loved ones as they recover after sustaining an SCI. In July 2024, New Perspective celebrated its 10-year anniversary, having given over $600,000 to more than 250 families since its inception.

== Books ==
- The Winning Mentality for Christian Athletes: Strategies for Mental Toughness in Competition and Life (2023)
- The Winning Mentality for Student Athletes: Strategies for Mental Toughness in Competition and Life (2023)
- Rainy Day Fun: An Origami Adventure (2024)
- Built on Faith: A Young Christian’s Guide to Unshakable Character (2025)
- Once a Buckeye: A Story of Football, Family & Faith (2026)

== Awards and honors ==
- On October 22, 2008, Gentry was nominated for the FedEx Orange Bowl courage award.
- On December 7, 2008, he received the Bo Rein Most Inspirational Player award, as voted on by his teammates.
- On February 9, 2009, the Columbus chapter of the National Football Foundation named its courage award in honor of Gentry, which he now gives out annually to an individual from Central Ohio who has shown great courage in the face of adversity.
- On September 15, 2009, Gentry was presented the E. Gordon Gee Spirit of Ohio State award.
