= Homer D. Babbidge Library =

University library in Connecticut, U.S.

Homer Babbidge Library
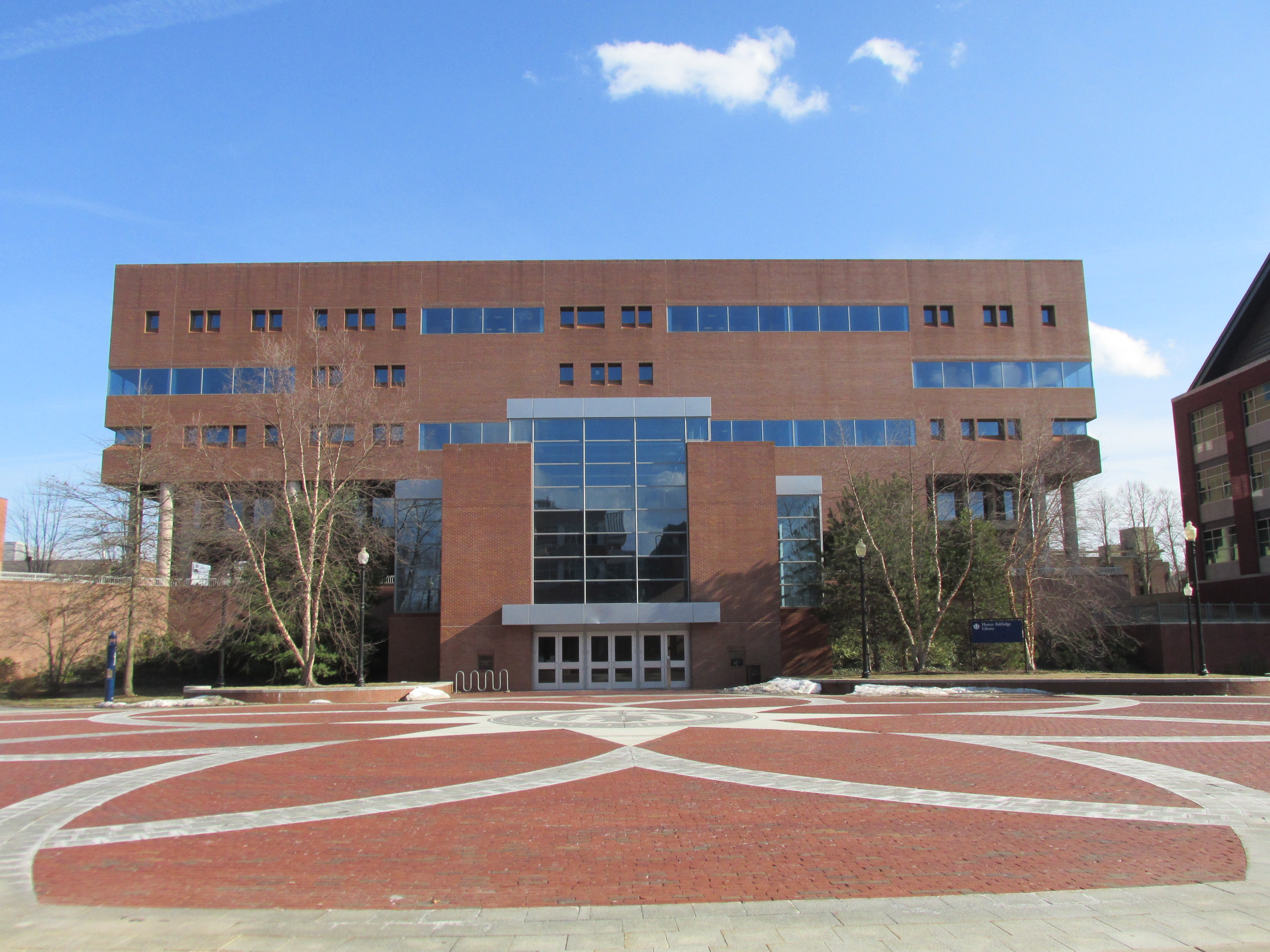
- 41.8066°N 72.2516°W
- Location: Storrs, Connecticut, United States
- Type: Academic library
- Established: 1978
- Architect: Robert S. McMillan

Collection
- Size: 3.2 million volumes

Other information
- Director: Anne Langley
- Parent organization: University of Connecticut
- Website: lib.uconn.edu

The Homer D. Babbidge Library (HBL) is the main library on the University of Connecticut campus in Storrs, Connecticut.

== History ==
In December 1962 University of Connecticut President Homer D. Babbidge Jr. went before the Connecticut Legislature to advocate for a stronger research-oriented institution in Storrs. When compared to its peers, UConn spent less on bookbinding, periodicals, collections development, and had an overall smaller inventory of books. UConn spent $30 per student on the library at a time when its peers were spending close to $70.

Only ten years later, near the end of his term, the university's library passed the one million volume mark, joining only 58 other American Universities (out of 2,200 total) that had a collection of 1 million or more volumes. Prior to Babbidge being built, the Wilbur Cross Library housed the university's books and volumes. That building has now been turned into the Wilbur Cross Building, which houses various administrative offices.

Regarding the naming of the university's new library, Bruce M. Stave writes that "Homer Daniels Babbidge, Jr., died of cancer at age 58 in March 1984. Shortly after his death, the University of Connecticut Board of Trustees, in a memorial tribute, named the university's new library, which stands central to the campus, in his honor."

While under construction, the new main library had been named the Nathan Hale Library at the urging of trustees appointed by Gov. Thomas Meskill, whose UConn budget cuts earlier prompted Babbidge to retire and run for governor against him.

== Notable staff ==
- Richard Bleiler (1959–), collections and humanities librarian since 1994; science fiction bibliographer and Bram Stoker Award nominee.
- John P. McDonald (1922–1993), library director from 1963 to 1986; executive director of the Association of Research Libraries (1974–76).
- Janice Merrill-Oldham (1947–2011), head of the library's preservation department from 1983 to 1995 and preeminent book conservator.
- Norman D. Stevens (1932–2018), university librarian from 1974 to 1986 and library director from 1986 to 1994; collector of librariana.
- Edwina Whitney (1868–1970), UConn's first professional librarian, serving from 1900 to 1934.
