= Charles C. McCracken =

American college president (1930–1935)

6th President of the University of Connecticut
- In office 1930–1935
- Preceded by: George A. Works
- Succeeded by: Albert N. Jorgensen

Personal details
- Born: June 27, 1882 Bellefontaine, Ohio, US
- Died: August 3, 1957 (aged 75) Tavares, Florida
- Education: Monmouth College; Harvard University
- Profession: Academic administration

Charles Chester McCracken (1882–1957) was an American academic administrator who served as the sixth president of the University of Connecticut (1930–1935).

== Life and career ==
Born in Bellefontaine, Ohio, in 1882, McCracken graduated from high school in 1899. He received his bachelor's degree from Monmouth College in 1908 and taught in public schools for several years in Illinois and Ohio. In 1911, he earned his master's degree from Harvard University. He served three years as dean of the normal college at Ohio Northern University before returning to Harvard on a fellowship, where he received his PhD in 1916. Soon after, he took charge of the Department of Psychology and Education at Western College for Women. From 1917 to 1930, McCracken was a professor of school administration at Ohio State University. In 1927 and 1928, he served on a commission of the United States Bureau of Education to survey historically black colleges and universities. In 1928, he took a lengthy leave of absence from his professorship at Ohio State University to consult for the Board of Christian Education of the Presbyterian Church on college education initiatives. McCracken also served on the American Council on Education board and was a member of Pi Kappa Delta and the American Association for the Advancement of Science.

== UConn presidency ==
Appointed president of Connecticut Agricultural College in 1930, McCracken played a pivotal role in the institution's transformation, leaading to its renaming as Connecticut State College in 1933, following a long campaign by students, faculty, and alumni. During McCracken's tenure, the state college shifted toward a more comprehensive liberal arts curriculum, resulting in a doubling of graduate programs and establishing new departments of music, government, philosophy, agricultural engineering, and psychology. Additionally, the college joined the New England Association of Colleges and Secondary Schools and the Association of State Universities in 1930 and celebrated its fiftieth anniversary in 1931. Enrollment increased and finances improved despite the economic impact of the Great Depression. However, despite these accomplishments, McCracken proved unpopular with faculty and eventually lost the trust of the college's trustees and state legislators. Consequently, he resigned in 1935 to become director of the Board of Christian Education of the Presbyterian Church in Philadelphia.

== Later life and death ==
McCracken died at home in 1957, after a long illness. He was survived by his wife, Cleo, and their four children.

Academic offices
Preceded by George A. Works	6th President of the University of Connecticut; 1930-1935	Succeeded by Albert N. Jorgensen
