= University of Connecticut College of Engineering =

College of Engineering in Storrs, Connecticut

Coordinates: 41.808121°N 72.254575°W

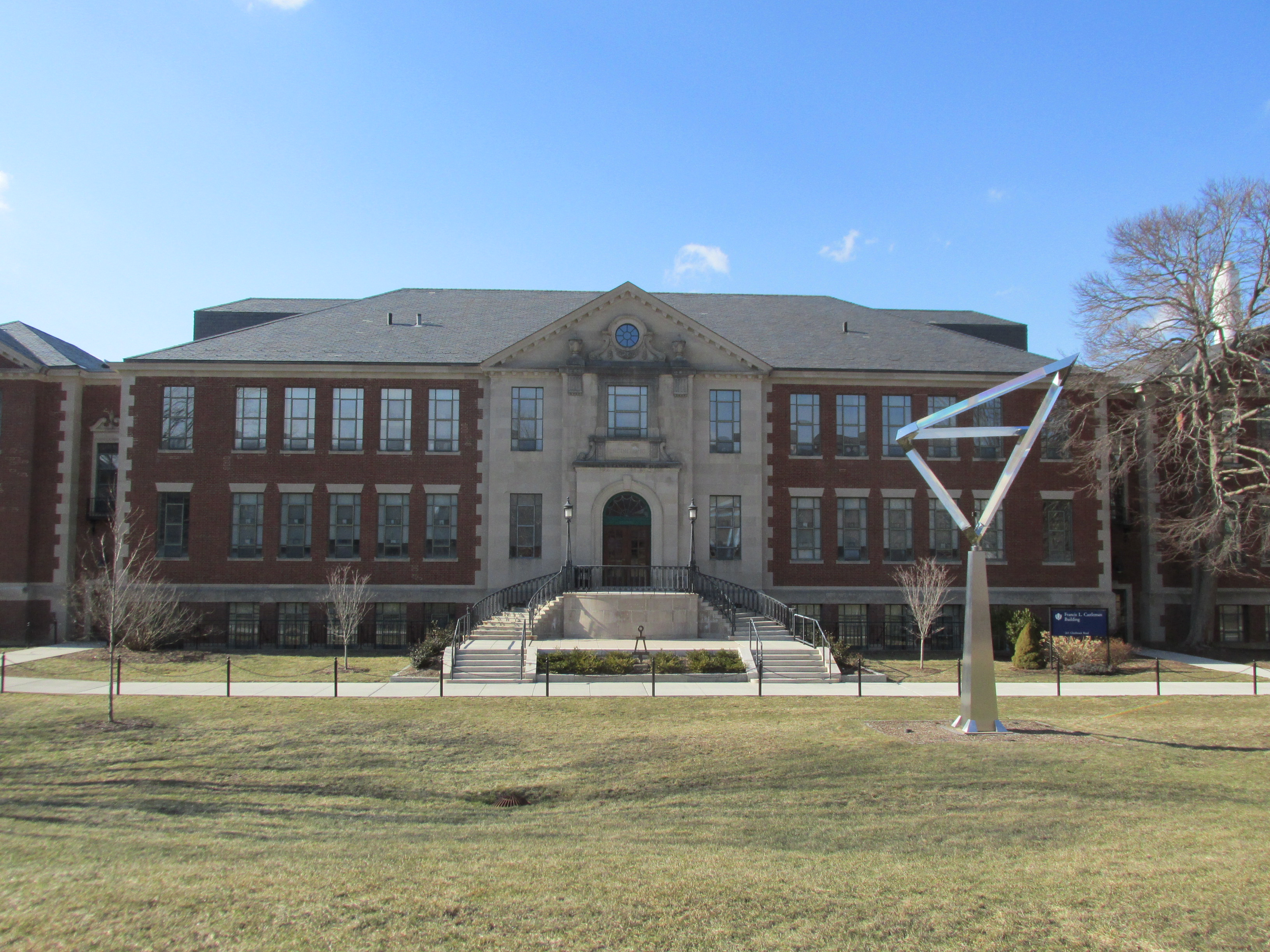
- Castleman Building
- Type: Public university
- Established: 1916
- Dean: Ji-Cheng 'JC' Zhao
- Location: Storrs, Connecticut, U.S.
- Website: engr.uconn.edu

The University of Connecticut College of Engineering is a college of engineering located on the main campus of the University of Connecticut in Storrs, Connecticut. Established in 1916, the college is often placed highly in national rankings, and is recognized as a national leader in closing the gender gap prevalent in undergraduate engineering

== Academics ==
University of Connecticut College of Engineering include following departments:

- Biomedical Engineering
- Chemical & Biomolecular Engineering
- Materials Science & Engineering
- Civil & Environmental Engineering
- Electrical & Computer Engineering
- Materials Science & Engineering

Additionally, the college includes the School of Mechanical, Aerospace, and Manufacturing Engineering and the School of Computing.

== Graduate programs ==
UConn Engineering offers M.S and Ph.D. degree programs including Biomedical Engineering, Chemical Engineering, Civil Engineering, Computer Science and Engineering, Electrical Engineering, Environmental Engineering, Material Science and Engineering, Mechanical Engineering, Polymer Science, Master of Engineering (MENG) and graduate-level Advanced Engineering Certificates.

Master of Engineering offerings include 30-credit, 10 course online concentrations with synchronous and asynchronous coursework in:

- Advanced Manufacturing for Energy Systems
- Advanced Systems Engineering
- Civil Engineering
- Clinical Engineering
- Computer Science and Engineering
- Data Science
- Electrical and Computer Engineering
- Environmental Engineering
- General Engineering
- Manufacturing
- Materials Science and Engineering
- MBA/Master of Engineering Dual Degree
- Mechanical Engineering

Advanced Engineering Certificates are 12-credit, 4 course online certificates with synchronous and asynchronous grad-level coursework that can be parlayed into a full Master of Engineering degree. Offerings include:

- Advanced Materials Characterization
- Advanced Systems Engineering
- Bridge Engineering
- Composites Engineering
- Contaminate Site Remediation
- Engineering Data Science
- Power Engineering
- Power Grid Modernization
- Process Engineering
