= Bruce M. Stave =

American historian (1937–2017)

- Born: May 17, 1937; Brooklyn, New York
- Died: December 2, 2017 (aged 80); Coventry, Connecticut
- Awards: Babbidge Awards for best book on Connecticut history

Academic background
- Education: Columbia University (BA, MA); University of Pittsburgh (PhD)

Academic work
- Discipline: History
- Sub-discipline: Oral history, urban history
- Institutions: University of Connecticut; University of Bridgeport

Bruce M. Stave (May 17, 1937 – December 2, 2017) was an American historian specializing in oral history and urban history. He was a Board of Trustees Distinguished Professor of History Emeritus at the University of Connecticut, where he taught for decades.

== Education ==
Stave was born in Brooklyn on May 17, 1937. He received his BA and MA from Columbia University and PhD in history from the University of Pittsburgh, where he held an Andrew W. Mellon Foundation predoctoral fellowship.

== Career ==
Stave began his academic career at the University of Bridgeport in 1965. He spent 1968 teaching as a Fulbright Program scholar in India. In 1970 he joined the University of Connecticut and moved to Coventry, Connecticut. Stave subsequently held Fulbright scholarships in Australia, New Zealand, and the Philippines in 1977 and at Peking University in 1984–1985. According to historian Richard D. Brown, Stave was "recognized around the world for his leadership in the field" of oral history. He advised oral history projects and practitioners in Argentina, Chile, China, Costa Rica, Cyprus, Greece, Kenya, New Zealand, the Philippines, Poland, Slovenia, South Africa, Sweden, and Turkey. Stave retired from UConn in 2002 but continued to work for the university in various capacities.

=== Scholarship ===
Stave served as director of UConn's Center for Oral History from 1978 to 2008 and history department chair from 1985 to 1994. He was editor of the Oral History Review from 1996 to 1999, and associate editor of the Journal of Urban History, both leading journals in their fields. With Linda Shopes, he was general editor of the Palgrave Studies in Oral History series, which had published thirty volumes by the time of Stave's death in 2017. He also authored or edited eleven books, including Red Brick in the Land of Steady Habits (2006), a history of UConn that the university commissioned to mark its 125th anniversary. Stave was a two-time winner of the Homer D. Babbidge Jr. Award from the Association for the Study of Connecticut History.

=== Service ===
Active in professional organizations, Stave served as president of the New England Historical Association (1994–1995), the New England Association of Oral History, and the Connecticut Coordinating Committee for the Promotion of History, which he had founded in 1979. He served as a vice president of the Connecticut Academy of Arts and Sciences and on the boards of the Connecticut Humanities Council and the Association for the Study of Connecticut History. In 2008, Governor Jodi Rell appointed him Acting Connecticut State Historian, in which capacity he served on the Connecticut Abraham Lincoln Bicentennial Commission.

Stave was active in UConn governance and labor organizing. In 1976, he was president of the Federation of University Teachers during the campaign that brought collective bargaining to UConn, and later served on the executive committee and bargaining team of the UConn chapter of the American Association of University Professors. He was an active member of the University Senate for many years, serving on the Senate executive committee and chairing several standing committees.

Stave also participated in local politics and civic organizations. He was active on Coventry's Democratic Town Committee for many years and served on the board of the Booth & Dimock Library in Coventry. Stave and his wife co-founded the Northeast Chapter of the Connecticut Civil Liberties Union.

== Personal life ==
Stave and wife Sondra Astor Stave (born 1941) met while working together at a summer camp in the Catskills in 1957. They married in 1961. They resided in Coventry, Connecticut, from 1970 onward. The couple traveled widely, visiting over one hundred countries and all seven continents. Following Bruce Stave's retirement, they ran an oral history consulting business and continued to volunteer for local organizations and educational programs.

Stave died from congestive heart failure on December 2, 2017. He was survived by his wife as well as their son and only child, Channing.

A graduate of City College of New York (1961) and the University of Connecticut (MA in English, 1968), Sondra Stave worked as a teacher, legislative assistant, and Mansfield director of adult education. She edited a cookbook series and held various leadership roles in civic organizations.

== Legacy ==
The Bruce M. and Sondra Astor Stave Prize in Recent American History was established by UConn in 2003.

Bruce Stave's papers are held at the University of Connecticut's Archives and Special Collections.

== Selected works ==
- Red Brick in the Land of Steady Habits: Creating the University of Connecticut, 1881–2006 (University Press of New England, 2006) – winner of the 2007 Homer D. Babbidge Jr. Award for "best book on a significant aspect of Connecticut's history" from the Association for the Study of Connecticut History.
- Witness to Nuremberg: An Oral History of American Participants at the War Crimes Trials (Twayne, 1998).
- From the Old Country: An Oral History of European Migration to America with John F. Sutherland and Aldo Salerno (University Press of New England, 1994) – winner of the 1995 Homer D. Babbidge Jr. Award from the Association for the Study of Connecticut History.
- Mills and Meadows: A Pictorial History of Northeast Connecticut (Donning, 1991).
- Talking about Connecticut: Oral History in the Nutmeg State (1985).
- Modern Industrial Cities: History, Policy, and Survival (Sage, 1981).
- The Making of Urban History: Historiography through Oral History (Sage, 1977).
- Socialism and the Cities (Kennikat Press, 1975).
- The Discontented Society: Interpretations of Twentieth-Century American Protest (Rand McNally, 1972).
- The New Deal and the Last Hurrah: Pittsburgh Machine Politics (University of Pittsburgh Press, 1970).
