= Henry Ruthven Monteith =

American college professor (1848–1922)

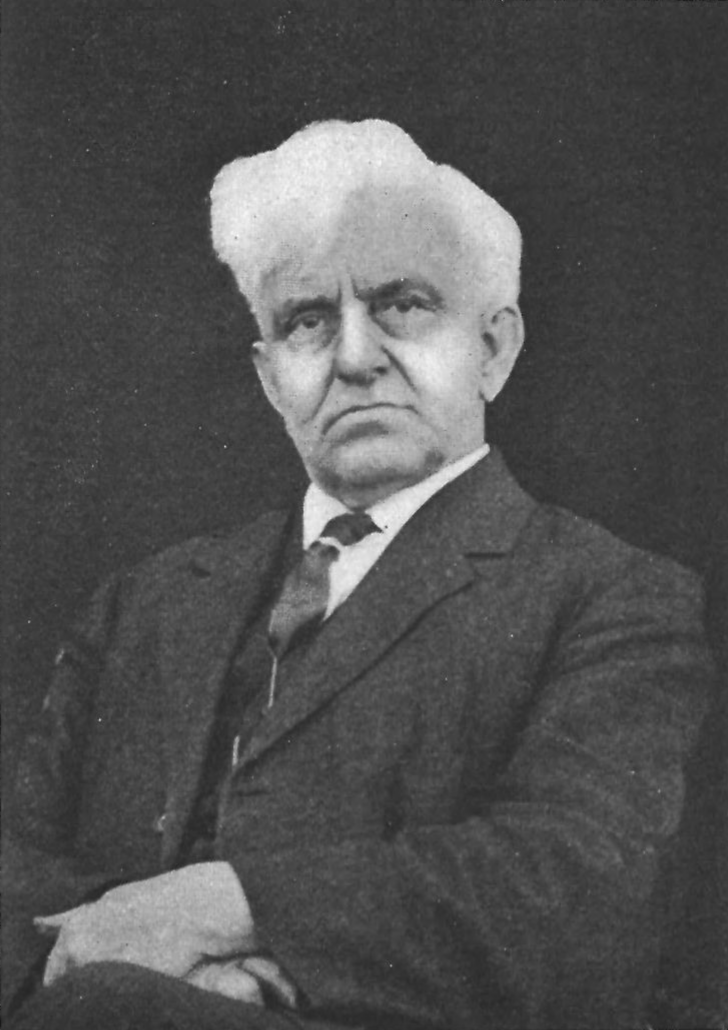
- Born: April 12, 1848; McIndoes Falls, Vermont, US
- Died: March 21, 1922 (aged 73); Mansfield, Connecticut, US
- Education: Dartmouth College (A.B.)
- Occupation: College professor
- Employer: University of Connecticut
- Title: Professor of History and English
- Term: 1900–1919
- Spouse: Ella Ryder
- Children: 2

Henry Ruthven Monteith (1848–1922) was an American educator who served as Professor of History and English at Connecticut Agricultural College (now the University of Connecticut) from 1900 to 1922.

== Education and early career ==
Monteith was born on April 12, 1848, in McIndoes Falls, Vermont, the son of William R. Monteith, a prominent local citizen, and Isabel Gilchrist. Earning his bachelor's degree from Dartmouth College in 1869, Monteith served in 1869–71 as the principal of McIndoes Academy, of which he was an alum and his father a trustee. He then moved to New York City, where he passed the bar exam and practiced law for several years. Returning to Vermont, he again became principal of McIndoes Academy in 1877. Monteith served in that position for two years before moving to Connecticut, where he was principal of Farmington High School from 1879 to 1899. He lived in Farmington for the rest of his life, commuting and staying overnight in Storrs three days a week.

== Connecticut Agricultural College ==
In 1900, Monteith was recruited to teach history, literature, and languages at Connecticut Agricultural College by college president George Washington Flint, who was Monteith's brother-in-law. He taught various subjects: in 1903, he was listed as a professor of history, civics, Latin, and mathematics; in 1906, Latin was dropped from the curriculum; in 1914, his title was professor of history and French; in 1916, his subjects were English and French. He retired in 1919 but continued to teach up until the time of his death. When he retired, Monteith was named emeritus professor of history – the first faculty member of the college to receive the emeritus designation.

Contemporaries described "Monty" as the "grand old man" of Connecticut Agricultural College. Popular among students, for many years Monteith served as faculty advisor to UConn's Daily Campus student newspaper and as teacher and mentor to generations of students. In 1921–22, female students convened the Monteith Arts Society "for the purpose of promoting an interest in literature and arts."

== Death and legacy ==
Monteith married Ella Ryder in New York City in 1873. They had two daughters: Isabel, a violinist and teacher at the Hartford Conservatory, and Marjorie, who scored the first goal at UConn's first-ever women's basketball game and captained the team. Marjorie married Robert K. Vibert, a Panama City merchant.

Monteith died suddenly of a cerebral hemorrhage in the campus dining hall on March 21, 1922. He was survived by his wife and daughters. His portrait, painted by Harold Green in Robert Brandegee's studio and completed around the time of Monteith's death, is held by the William Benton Museum of Art.

Opened in 1959 and renovated in 2016, the Monteith Building on UConn's Storrs campus is named in his honor. It is the home of the UConn Mathematics Department in the Storrs campus.
