= Allen Centennial Garden =

- Agricultural Dean's House
- U.S. National Register of Historic Places
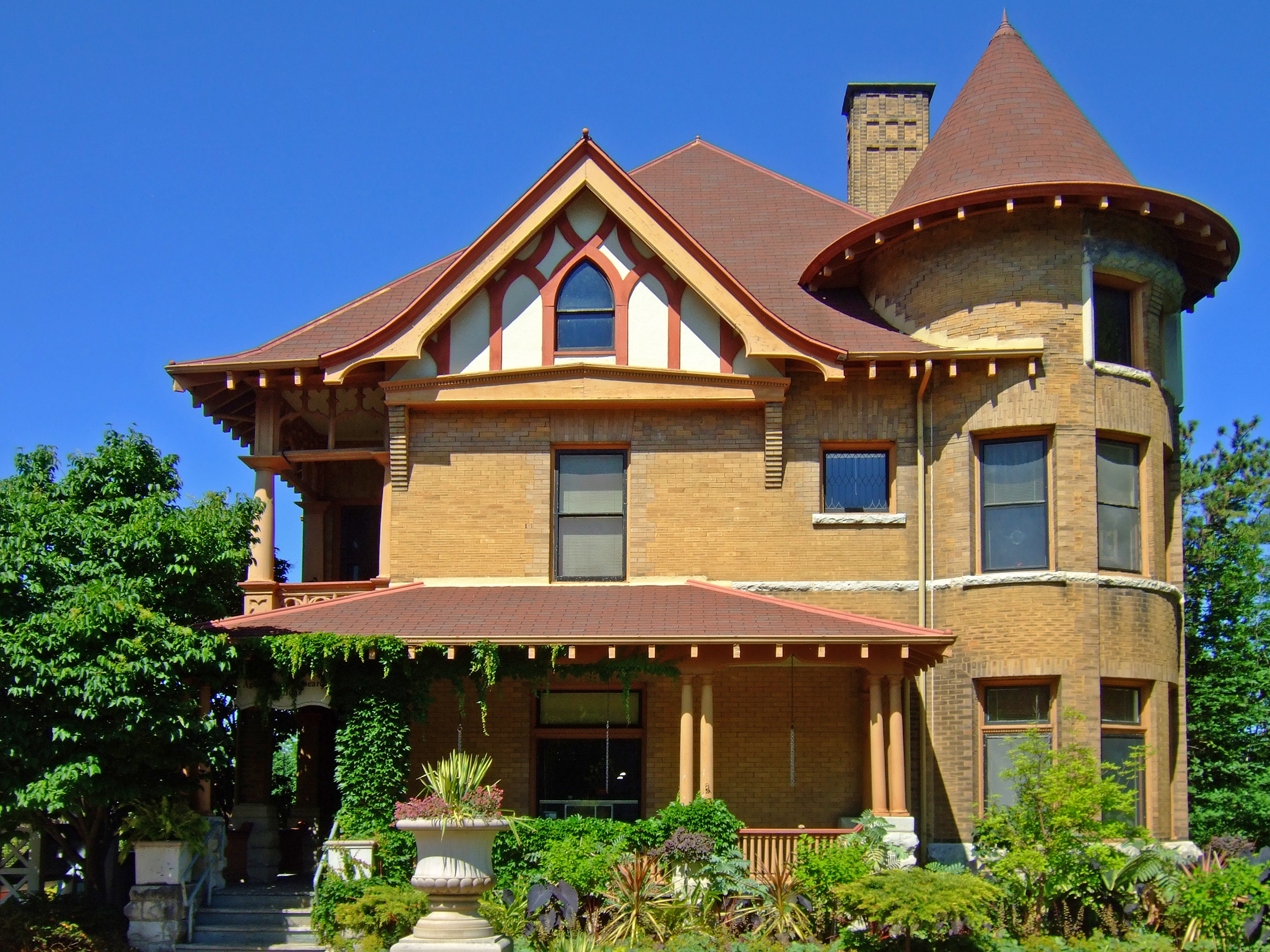

- Location within Wisconsin Location within the United States
- Location: 10 Babcock Dr., Madison, Wisconsin
- Coordinates: 43°4′37″N 89°24′46″W
- Area: 1.9 acres (0.77 ha)
- Built: 1896
- Architect: Allan Conover and Lew F. Porter
- Architectural style: Queen Anne
- NRHP reference No.: 84003627
- Added to NRHP: September 20, 1984

The Allen Centennial Garden is a free public garden on the grounds of the University of Wisconsin–Madison. The grounds feature the Agricultural Dean's House, a brick Queen Anne-style home built in 1896, and the home of the first four deans of the College of Agricultural and Life Sciences. In 1984 the house itself was listed on the National Register of Historic Places.

== House ==
The Queen Anne house overlooking the garden was designed for William Arnon Henry, the first dean of the University of Wisconsin–Madison College of Agriculture. When he came to the university, he purchased a small frame farm house on campus in a section where the university farm workman lived. By the 1890s, other universities were attempting to lure Henry away from Wisconsin. To placate him, the university offered Henry a salary increase, vacation time, and an $8,000 appropriation for a house. Another $2,000 was later invested in the house, and when completed in 1896, Henry assumed all further expenses. It was designed by Allan D. Conover and Lew F. Porter.

Henry was dean of the school from 1887 until 1907, when he resigned due to poor health. Three other deans lived in the house: Harry Luman Russell (1907–1931), C. L. Christensen (1931–1943), and Edwin Broun Fred (1943–1945). Fred's family continued to live in the house even after he was named president of the university. In 1980, they left the house and it became the offices of the Experimental Farms. On September 20, 1984, the house was recognized by the National Park Service with a listing on the National Register of Historic Places. The Experimental Farms offices were relocated in 2011. The interior of the house was stripped and is awaiting renovation.

== Gardens ==
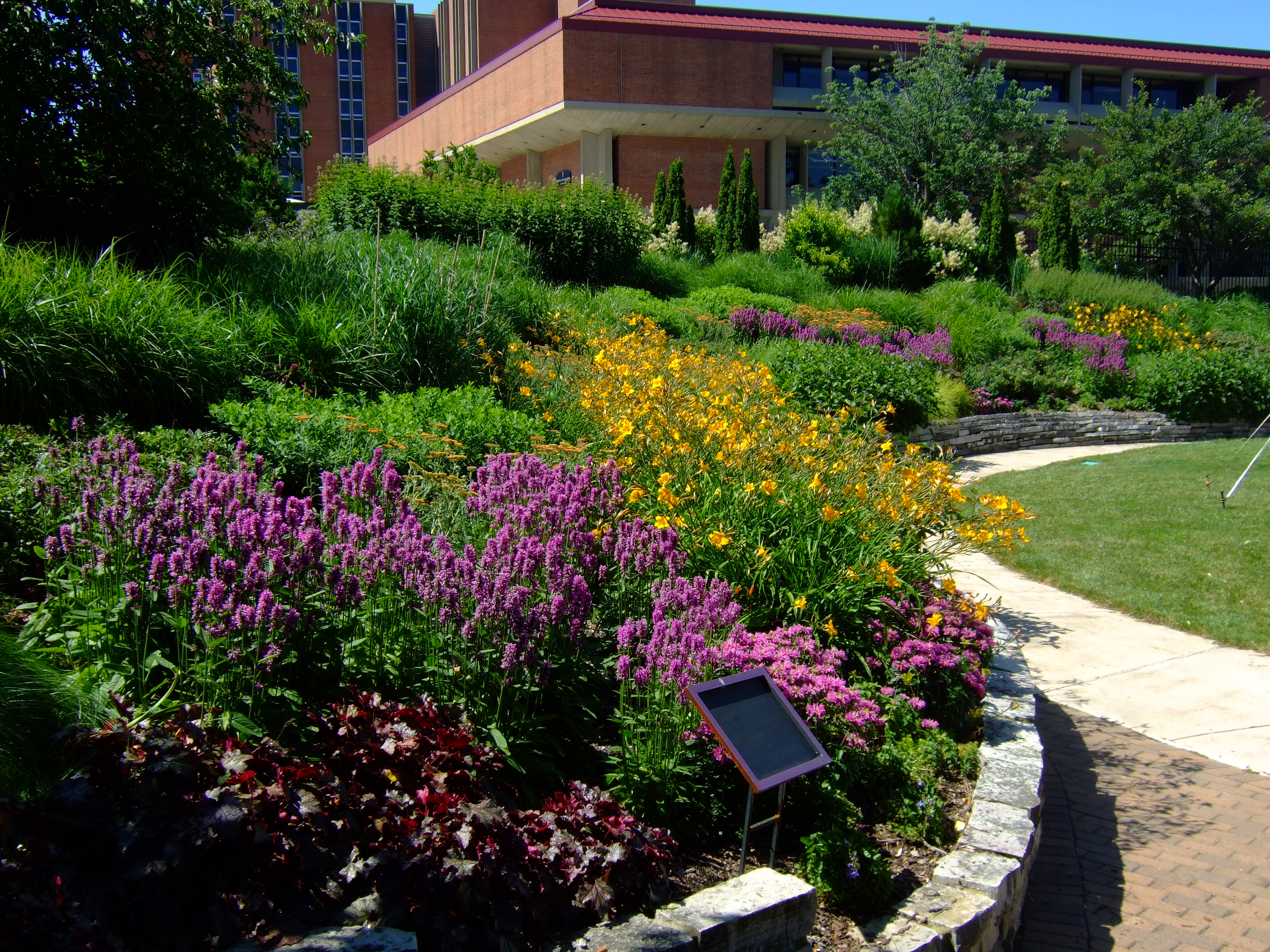
A section of the gardens

In 1979, the classroom gardens outside the Plant Sciences Building were destroyed to make room for an addition. In the early 1980s, the university decided to move these gardens to the former dean's house. Donations from university gifts and student groups provided for initial planning and design. Thanks to a gift from Ethel Allen, the widow of bacteriologist Oscar Allen, groundbreaking began in the spring of 1985. When completed in October 1989, the garden was named the Allen Centennial Gardens, commemorating Oscar Allen and the recent 100th anniversary of the College of Agricultural and Life Sciences. The gardens continue to be independently funded.
