= George Washington Flint =

2nd President of the University of Connecticut (1898–1901)

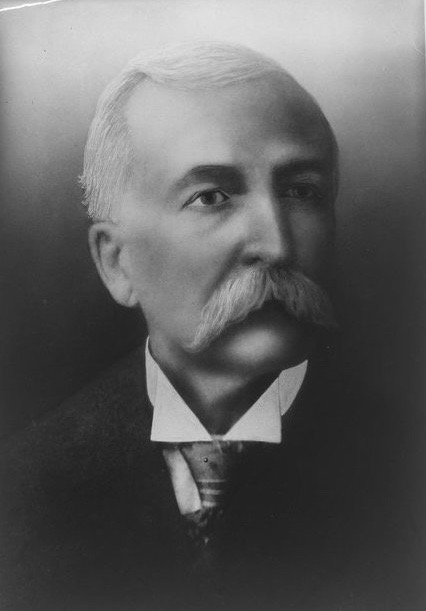

2nd President of the University of Connecticut
- In office 1898–1901
- Preceded by: Benjamin F. Koons
- Succeeded by: Rufus W. Stimson

Personal details
- Born: March 2, 1844 Yarmouth, Nova Scotia
- Died: October 23, 1921 (aged 77) Arlington, Massachusetts
- Spouse: Elizabeth Monteith
- Education: Bates College
- Profession: Academic administration

George Washington Flint (March 2, 1844 — October 23, 1921) was an American educator and academic administrator who served as the second president of Storrs Agricultural College, now the University of Connecticut, from 1898 to 1901.

== Education and career ==
Born in Yarmouth, Nova Scotia, and raised in Maine, Flint was the son of William and Emeline (Vickery) Flint. He graduated salutorian from Bates College in 1871 and earned his master's degree from Bates in 1874. A lifelong secondary school teacher and administrator, Flint served as principal of Franceston Academy in New Hampshire (1871–1873), West Lebanon Academy in Maine (1873–1874), and Collinsville High School in Connecticut (1875–1898). He was a leading citizen in the Collinsville community, chairing the Ecclesiastical Society of the Collinsville Congregational Church, superintending Sunday school, and serving as president of the Collinsville Savings Society. Flint was also active in the Connecticut Association of Classical High School Teachers and spoke Latin, Greek, and Old English. He was a friend of William Edgar Simonds, a Collinsville-based lawyer and politician who chaired the Storrs Agricultural College's board of trustees and pushed for Flint's appointment as president in 1898.

Following his departure from UConn, Flint became principal at Conant High School in East Jeffrey, New Hampshire (1903–1908). He spent two years in Pasadena, California (1911–1913) and worked twice at Choralcele Manufacturing Company in South Boston (1908–1911, 1913–1920).

== Storrs Agricultural College ==
Flint became President of Storrs Agricultural College on July 1, 1898, following the ouster of the previous president, Benjamin F. Koons. Flint quickly clamped down on wasteful spending, upgraded the college's farming equipment, and built a new agricultural hall (the first brick building on campus). Flint's detractors among the faculty decried his management style as autocratic, though reportedly no one ever questioned his personal integrity.

Flint's presidency was marked by controversy as he attempted to steer the college away from its agricultural roots toward a more comprehensive classical education. Tensions ran so high that the conflict was nicknamed the "War of the Rebellion." Several faculty opposed to Flint resigned or were forced out. Debates raged in the op-ed sections of newspapers as far afield as Boston and New York. Connecticut newspapers staked out competing positions, with the Hartford Times and the Yale University-aligned New Haven Register arguing for and against Flint. In August 1901, the Connecticut State Grange, representing more than twelve thousand farmers, and the Connecticut Pomological Society called for Flint's resignation.

Following heated debate, the college's board of trustees voted to fire Flint effective immediately on October 5, 1901. Trustees declined to grant him a professorship, as they had done with Koons, but voted to pay Flint his salary till the following July. Rufus W. Stimson succeeded Flint as president. Flint's ouster ended the influence of Simonds over the college.

Flint's landmark achievement came on June 14, 1899, when the Connecticut General Assembly renamed the Storrs Agricultural College to the Connecticut Agricultural College. The rebranding underscored the college's statewide reach and status as a land-grant institution.

In fall 1900, Flint hired his brother-in-law, Henry Ruthven Monteith (1848–1922), to teach English, history, civics, and political economy at the college. A long-time advisor to the Daily Campus student newspaper, Monteith became one of the college's most influential and popular faculty. The Monteith Building on UConn's Storrs campus was named in his honor.

== Personal life ==
Flint married Elizabeth Monteith of McIndoe's Falls, Vermont, on January 30, 1873. The couple had one daughter (Georgiana, b. 1882) and two sons (William, b. 1875, and Harry, b. 1880), both of whom attended Yale University. George Flint died in Arlington, Massachusetts, on October 23, 1921. Elizabeth Flint died in Pasadena, California, on November 17, 1931.

Academic offices
| Preceded by Benjamin F. Koons | 2nd President of the University of Connecticut; 1898-1901 | Succeeded by Rufus W. Stimson |
