= Sarah Platt-Decker =

American suffragist

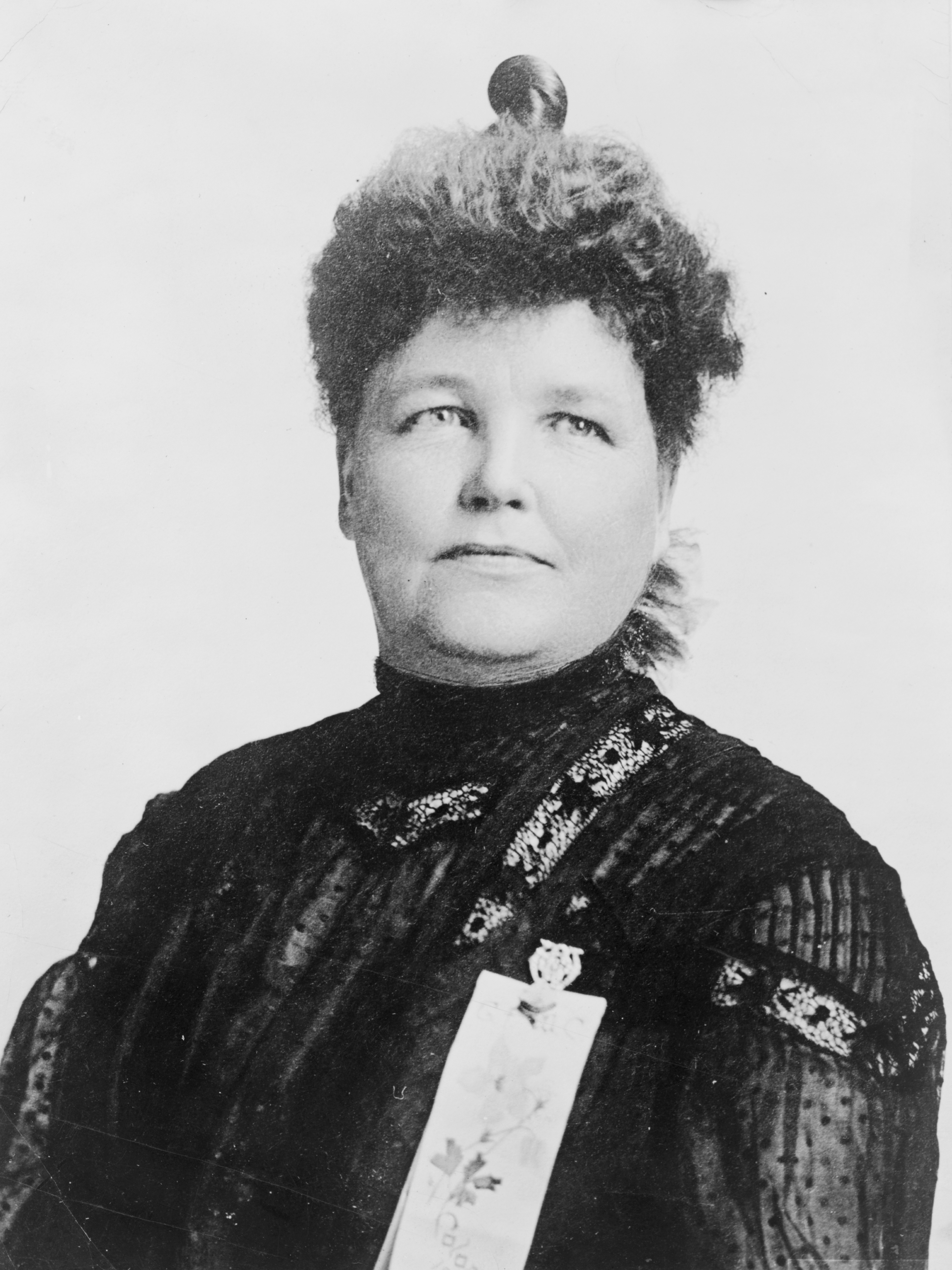
- Sarah S. Platt-Decker, Representative Women of Colorado, 1914
- Born: Sarah Sophia Chase; 1856; McIndoe Falls, Vermont
- Died: July 7, 1912 (aged 56); San Francisco
- Occupation: Suffragist
- Organizations: Federation of Associated Women's Clubs
- Awards: Colorado Women's Hall of Fame

Sarah Sophia Chase Platt-Decker (1856 – July 7, 1912) was an American suffragist. Mostly active in Denver, Colorado, she also served as the national president of the Federation of Associated Women's Clubs from 1904 to 1908.

== Career ==
Platt-Decker was born Sarah Sophia Chase in McIndoe Falls, Vermont, in 1856. Her father was a strong prohibitionist and her mother was a descendant of the Adams political family. Her first husband, Charles Bond Harris (1843-1878), died after three years of marriage; the loss of her own possessions when her husband's estate was given to other members of his family inspired her to become an activist for women's rights.

In 1884, Platt-Decker moved to Queens, New York, where she worked in children and orphans' welfare.

She married James Henry Platt Jr. (1837-1894), a widower, physician, former U.S. Congressman and director of the Mineola Children's Home in 1884. They moved to Denver, Colorado in 1887. The couple were active in Denver politics, and Platt-Decker led a relief effort for unemployed silver miners and spoke at a political rally during the Denver Depression of 1893. After James Platt's death in 1894, Platt-Decker became the first woman appointed to the Colorado Board of Pardons and served on the Board of Charities and Corrections from 1898 onwards.

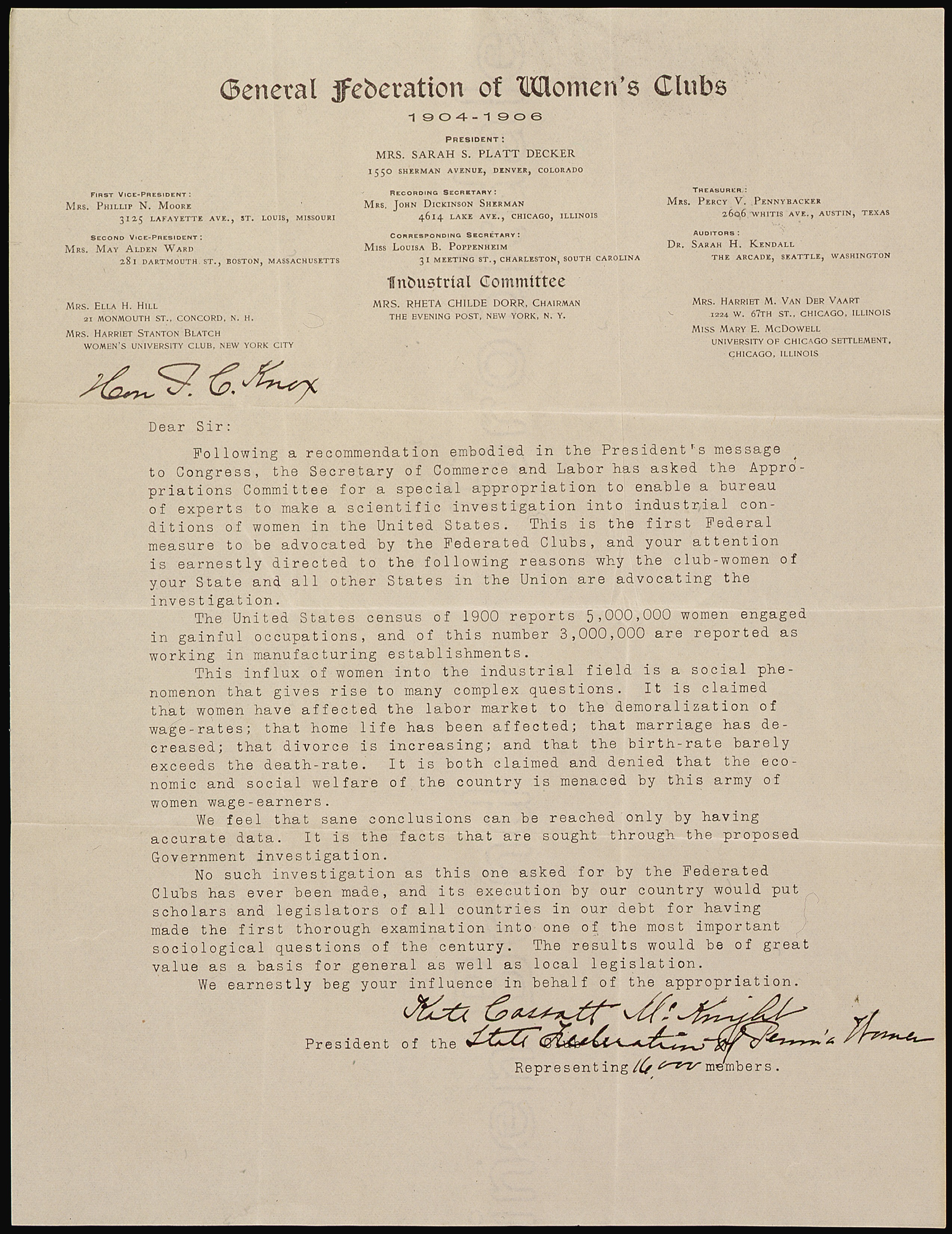
Petition to J. C. Knox from the State Federation of Pennsylvania Women for an investigation into the industrial conditions of women on General Federation of Women's Clubs letterhead with Sarah Platt Decker as President

Platt-Decker married a third time in 1899, to Westbrook Schoonmaker Decker (1839-1903), a Denver judge who died in 1903. Before his death, she helped to found the Denver Women's Club, served as its first president, and established the Denver Home for Dependent Children. In 1904, she was elected the national president of the General Federation of Women's Clubs. In her four years as president, she gave hundreds of speeches persuading members to take up the cause of women's suffrage.

== Death and legacy ==
Platt-Decker died in San Francisco in 1912 after a bout of kidney disease while attending the General Federation of Women's Clubs convention. An obituary in a Denver newspaper described her as "Colorado's foremost woman citizen and the real leader of the suffrage movement in the United States". Another wrote that she deserved "a great share of the credit that Colorado became the first state in the Union to realize the political rights of women". Platt-Decker was inducted into the Colorado Women's Hall of Fame in 1990. The Decker Branch Library of Denver Public Libraries is named after her.
