= Benjamin F. Koons =

Principal and 1st President of the University of Connecticut (1883–1898)

Benjamin Franklin Koons
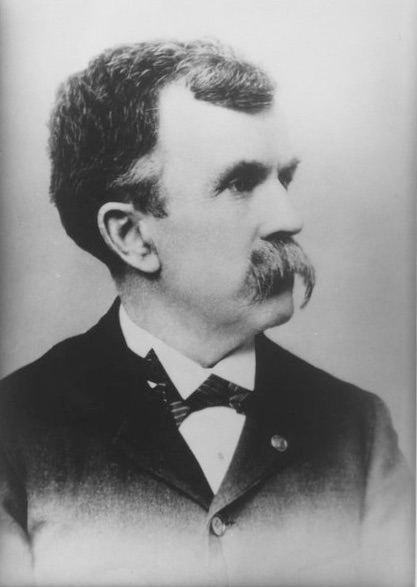

1st President of the University of Connecticut
- In office 1893–1898
- Preceded by: None
- Succeeded by: George Washington Flint

Principal of Storrs Agricultural School University of Connecticut
- In office 1883–1893
- Preceded by: Henry P. Armsby

Personal details
- Born: September 8, 1844 Sulphur Springs, Ohio
- Died: December 17, 1903 (aged 59) Storrs, Connecticut
- Spouse: Jane Stevenson Koons
- Education: Oberlin College (B.A.); Yale University (Ph.D)
- Profession: Natural history, academic administration

Benjamin Franklin Koons (1844 – 1903) was an American natural historian who served as second Principal of Storrs Agricultural School (1883–1893) and first President of Storrs Agricultural College (1893–1898), now the University of Connecticut.

== Early life and education ==
Born on September 8, 1844, in Sulphur Springs, Ohio, Koons was one of twelve children of farmers Abraham and Jane Koons. In 1862, Koons enlisted in the 123rd Ohio Volunteer Infantry Regiment. He fought in seventeen American Civil War engagements, including the battles of Winchester, Cedar Creek, and Appomattox. He was captured at the Battle of High Ridge and held prisoner until Robert E. Lee's surrender. He was mustered out in 1865 with the rank of corporal and returned to the family farm.

After taking preparatory courses at Oberlin College between 1866 and 1869, Koons matriculated to Oberlin in the fall of 1870 and graduated in 1874 with an A.B. degree. He then spent several years teaching in Chattanooga, Tennessee (1874–1876); Mobile, Alabama (1876–1878); and Savannah, Georgia (1878–1879). He served as principal at Mobile's Emerson Institute, founded by the Freedmen's Bureau and operated by the American Missionary Association. He also worked summers as an assistant zoologist for the United States Fish Commission and was stationed for part of that time at Woods Hole, Massachusetts. Koons went on to earn his A.M. degree from Oberlin in 1878 and his PhD from Yale University's Sheffield Scientific School in 1881.

== Career ==
Appointed by the school's trustees in August 1881, Koons was one of three founding faculty at Storrs Agricultural School. Koons became Professor of Natural History, teaching subjects such as zoology, geology, and animal husbandry. The other appointees consisted of Principal Solomon Mead, who retired in 1882, and Vice Principal Henry P. Armsby, who served as acting principal in 1882–1883 before resigning to work at the Wisconsin Agricultural Experiment Station. Koons was appointed principal in 1883.

The school may well have toiled in obscurity were it not for the influence of the Connecticut State Grange, which criticized Yale, then Connecticut's land-grant university, for elitist admission standards and lack of support for practical agricultural education. Pressure mounted after the United States Congress passed the Morrill Act of 1890, which assured extra funding for agricultural and mechanical colleges. In 1893, the Connecticut General Assembly approved the establishment of Storrs Agricultural College, shifting state and federal funding from Yale to Storrs. Principal Koons became president of the new college.

Koons expanded the college rolls from thirty students and three faculty in 1883 to 132 students and fifteen faculty in 1898. At least twenty of these students were women, reflecting Koons' background at Oberlin, which was the first coeducational college in the country. Women were taking classes at Storrs as early as 1891, when Mansfield residents Nellie Wilson and Louise Rosebrooks attended. Three women graduated in 1894, even though the institution was not officially coeducational until 1893.

Koons was a skilled instructor and popular with his students. His research focused on entomology, zoology, and geology.

=== Resignation ===
Commemorative plaque at UConn

Koons was eased out in 1898 by the Board of Trustees, chaired by William Edgar Simonds. According to historian Walter Stemmons, the trustees were dissatisfied with Koons' relaxed approach to governance and wanted a firmer hand on the tiller. Koons returned to the faculty as a professor of natural science and political economy. The trustees also appointed him curator of the college's natural history museum, granted him a cottage on campus, and allowed him various other perks and sinecures.

Koons had been a popular president, and his removal and replacement by George Washington Flint, who was a believer in classical education, triggered a slow-burning revolt. Faculty and the State Grange finally demanded Flint's ouster. Flint resigned in 1901. Koons remained a popular professor at the college until his death in 1903. Following his departure as president, his scientific pursuits took him to Alaska in 1898 and the Grand Canyon and Yosemite in 1903, where he collected geological specimens.

=== Legacy ===
A three-story brick building constructed in 1913 at the cost of $75,000, Benjamin Franklin Koons Hall was named in the former president's honor. Originally a men's dormitory, Koons Hall now houses classrooms, offices, and laboratories for the Department of Allied Health Sciences on UConn's Storrs campus.

Koons' papers are held at the UConn Archives & Special Collections.

== Personal life ==
In 1882, Koons married Miss Jane "Jennie" Stevenson (1848–1933) of Bellafontaine, Ohio. They had met in Mobile, Alabama while teaching at the Emerson Institute.

After a year-long battle with throat cancer, Koons died at his home in Storrs on December 17, 1903. He was survived by his wife and children, Grace and Frank. At the time Grace was a student at Northfield Seminary while Frank studied at Storrs Agricultural College. A third daughter, Jennie, had died in infancy in 1884.

Jane Koons died in Garden City, New York, in March 1933 and was interred at Storrs Cemetery, on a hill overlooking campus, beside her husband.

Academic offices
Preceded by Henry P. Armsby	Principal & 1st President of the University of Connecticut; 1883-1898	Succeeded by George Washington Flint
