= Fisc (disambiguation) =

Fisc may refer to:

- fisc, taxes paid in kind, especially those of the Frankish kings, or a knight's money holder

As an acronym, FISC may refer to:

- Farm and Industry Short Course, a farmer-based program through the University of Wisconsin-Madison College of Agricultural and Life Sciences
- fast instruction set computer, a term used in computer science describing a CPU where the notion of complex instruction set computing (CISC) and reduced instruction set computing (RISC) have become deprecated
- Fleet and Industrial Supply Center, an archaic name for an installation of a NAVSUP Fleet Logistics Center maintained by the Naval Supply Systems Command of the United States Navy
- United States Foreign Intelligence Surveillance Court (also known as the FISA Court), a U.S. federal court

== See also ==
- fiscus, the personal treasury of the emperors of Rome
