= Allen Gardens =

Allen Gardens may refer to:

- Allan Gardens, Toronto, Ontario, Canada
- Allen Centennial Gardens, University of Wisconsin–Madison
