= Solomon Mead =

American school administrator (1881–1882)

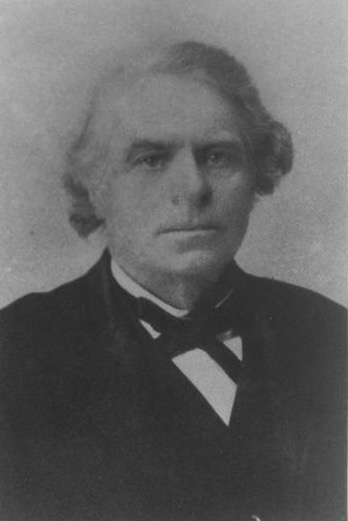

1st Principal of Storrs Agricultural School (University of Connecticut)
- In office 1881–1882
- Preceded by: None
- Succeeded by: Henry P. Armsby

Personal details
- Born: November 10, 1829 South Salem, New York
- Died: 1905 (aged 75–76) New Haven, Connecticut
- Spouse(s): Elizabeth Chapin Deming, Clarissa Adele Green
- Profession: Farmer, iron founder, academic administrator

Solomon Mead (November 10, 1829 – 1905) was an American farmer, inventor, and iron founder who served as the first Principal of the Storrs Agricultural School, later the University of Connecticut (1881–1882).

== Life ==
The eldest of five sons born to Richard and Hannah (Keeler) Mead, Solomon Mead was born in South Salem, New York, on November 10, 1829. He moved to New Haven in 1852 and three years later (on January 17, 1855) married Elizabeth Chapin Deming of Derby. The family lived on New Haven's Derby Avenue. Elizabeth Deming Mead died in New Haven on April 23, 1890. Mead subsequently married Clarissa Adele Green (1853–1916), who survived him. Mead and his first wife had seven children, three of whom survived their father.

Solomon Mead's younger brother, Linus Mead (1835–1906), also lived in New Haven after 1870 and helped with his sibling's plough manufacturing concern.

In May 1857, the Scientific American reported that Mead and his wife had suffered from mild arsenic poisoning due to contaminated wallpaper in their home.

== Career ==
On September 15, 1863, Mead patented a plough featuring a curved moldboard, which according to the patent turned soil more thoroughly with less effort. Termed a "conical plough" or "cylinder plough," it received positive reviews from various agricultural publications. As of 1876, Mead owned a four-story shop and iron foundry in New Haven, which he used to manufacture and distribute his patented ploughs. He also studied agriculture at the Sheffield Scientific School. He was a member of the New Haven County Horticultural Society.

== Storrs Agricultural School ==
Intended to educate young men in practical science and agriculture, the Storrs Agricultural School was established in April 1881 by the Connecticut General Assembly on the basis of donated land and money from Charles and Augustus Storrs. In August 1881, the school's trustees appointed Mead principal and professor of agriculture. He came "warmly recommended" by Samuel William Johnson. Mead's wife acted as school matron. The New York Tribune called Mead "a plain, shrewd, active and even-tempered man" with "a wide experience in and a varied knowledge of agriculture, horticulture, and arboriculture." The Journal of the American Agricultural Association described Mead as a "practical farmer and gardener."

Mead was responsible for running the school and was not expected to participate in instruction. Henry P. Armsby oversaw academics in his capacity of vice-principal and professor of agricultural chemistry. Benjamin F. Koons became professor of natural history. These were the three founding faculty at Storrs Agricultural School.

Mead presided over the first year of the Storrs Agricultural School, enrolling six students for the class of 1881 and eighteen for the class of 1882. He retired in April 1882 and was succeeded by Armsby on an acting basis until the appointment of Koons at the start of the winter term 1883.

After retiring, Mead returned to New Haven and continued to live there until his death in 1905.

Academic offices
Preceded by None	1st Principal of Storrs Agricultural College; University of Connecticut; 1881-1882	Succeeded by Henry P. Armsby
