= Charles Codding =

American politicians from New Jersey (1852–1924)

Charles N. Codding

Member of the New Jersey General Assembly from Union County
- In office 1894–1895 Serving with John N. Burger and Joseph Cross
- Preceded by: Timothy M. Kelly; Thomas F. Lane; George Kyte
- Succeeded by: Henry Clauss; J. Martin Roll; William R. Coddington

Personal details
- Born: December 21, 1861 Collinsville, Connecticut
- Died: January 21, 1926 (aged 64) Westfield, New Jersey
- Party: Republican
- Spouse: Adele C. Bonfield
- Education: Phillips Academy
- Alma mater: Yale University (A.B.); Columbia Law School (L.L.B.)

Charles Nelson Codding (December 21, 1861 – January 21, 1926) was an American attorney and Republican Party politician who represented Union County, New Jersey in the New Jersey General Assembly from 1894 to 1895.

== Early life and education ==
Charles Nelson Codding was born on December 21, 1861, in Collinsville, Connecticut, to Samuel N. and Fidelia S. Codding. He was educated at Phillips Academy and graduated from Yale University in 1886 with a bachelor's degree. He received a bachelor of laws degree from Columbia Law School in 1888.

== Legal career ==
After graduating from law school, Codding was admitted to the New Jersey bar and moved to Westfield, New Jersey. He had law offices on Broad Street in Elizabeth.

In addition to his legal work, Codding served as a director of the Westfield Trust Company.

== Political career ==
In 1893, Codding was elected to represent Union County in the New Jersey General Assembly. He was re-elected in 1894, serving in the 118th and 119th assemblies. From 1901 to 1903, he played a major role in the reincorporation of Westfield as a town government. He chaired the committee of incorporation, which submitted the bill reforming the municipal charter to the state legislature. After vigorous debate, it was signed by the governor on March 4, 1903.

He was appointed by Foster Voorhees as managing head of the office of clerk of the Supreme Court of New Jersey and reappointed by successive governors Franklin Murphy and Edward C. Stokes. In 1917, he was elected Union County Surrogate.

In 1920, Codding served as vice chair of the New Jersey Republican State Committee and endorsed Leonard Wood for president. In the same year, he served on the Westfield bicentennial committee and chaired the subcommittee on speakers alongside Arthur N. Pierson.

== Personal life and death ==
Codding married Adele C. Bonfield on October 18, 1888, in Beverly, New Jersey.

He was a member of the Atlas Lodge, the Free and Accepted Masons, the Royal Arcanum, the Loyal Association, the Heptasophs, and the Westfield Golf Club. He also served as president of the Westfield Athletic Club and the Central Jersey Baseball League and as a volunteer member of the Westfield Fire Department.

Codding died on January 21, 1926.

=== Legacy ===
In 2012, the Westfield Historical Society inducted Codding into their hall of fame, recognizing him as "the first sophisticated leader of Westfield."
