= Collinsville, Connecticut =

Census-designated place in Connecticut, United States

- Collinsville Historic District
- U.S. National Register of Historic Places
- U.S. Historic district
- Location within Connecticut Location within the United States
- Location: CT 179, Collinsville, Connecticut
- Coordinates: 41°48′44″N 72°55′22″W
- Architect: Collins Co.
- Architectural style: Greek Revival, Italianate, Romanesque
- NRHP reference No.: 76001994
- Added to NRHP: June 23, 1976

Collinsville is a village and census-designated place (CDP) in the town of Canton, Hartford County, Connecticut, United States. As of the 2020 census, Collinsville had a population of 3,721. The central portion of the village is a historic district listed on the National Register of Historic Places.

It was built around the Collins Company Axe Factory, a manufacturer of edge tools, such as axes, machetes, picks and knives. Collins machetes were the brand of choice in South America. Collins tools were used almost exclusively for the construction of the Trans-Siberian Railway, and axes and picks made their way across the country to be used in the California Gold Rush. Admiral Peary carried Collins tools to the North Pole.

Typical of New England mills, the Collins Company axe factory was sited on a river (the Farmington), and their production was powered by utilizing the water's strength to turn turbines and power machines. The numerous old buildings ramble along the riverbanks intertwined by an intricate maze of sluices that run throughout the site. The company closed its doors in 1966, but the factory buildings stayed standing and are now rented out to local businesses. The ambiance of Main Street reflects period architecture with ornate details from the start of the 20th century.

== History ==
According to historian Diana Muir, writing in Reflections in Bullough's Pond, it was in Collinsville that Elisha Root invented the important industrial technique of die casting. Root was employed by Samuel W. Collins, whose Collins and Company was the largest manufacturer of axes in the nineteenth century. Other famous historical residents of Collinsville included George Washington Flint and William E. Simonds.

Collinsville hosts an annual Halloween Parade through the historic town. The parade is held on the last Saturday of October at 7 p.m. Children's activities begin at 6 p.m.

Collinsville was voted one of the "Top 10 Coolest Small Towns in America" in the September 2007 issue of Arthur Frommer's Budget Travel magazine.

== Geography ==
According to the United States Census Bureau, the CDP has a total area of 3.6 square miles (9.2 km^{2}), of which 3.1 square miles (8.1 km^{2}) is land and 0.42 square miles (1.1 km^{2}), or 11.79%, is water.

== Demographics ==
=== 2020 census ===
As of the 2020 census, Collinsville had a population of 3,721. The median age was 46.1 years. 21.2% of residents were under the age of 18 and 22.3% of residents were 65 years of age or older. For every 100 females, there were 87.2 males, and for every 100 females age 18 and over, there were 84.6 males age 18 and over.

95.6% of residents lived in urban areas, while 4.4% lived in rural areas.

There were 1,586 households in Collinsville, of which 28.6% had children under the age of 18 living in them. Of all households, 47.0% were married-couple households, 14.6% were households with a male householder and no spouse or partner present, and 31.4% were households with a female householder and no spouse or partner present. About 32.8% of all households were made up of individuals, and 15.0% had someone living alone who was 65 years of age or older.

There were 1,640 housing units, of which 3.3% were vacant. The homeowner vacancy rate was 0.6% and the rental vacancy rate was 1.2%.

Racial composition as of the 2020 census
Race	Number	Percent
White	3,293	88.5%
Black or African American	58	1.6%
American Indian and Alaska Native	4	0.1%
Asian	107	2.9%
Native Hawaiian and Other Pacific Islander	0	0.0%
Some other race	22	0.6%
Two or more races	237	6.4%
Hispanic or Latino (of any race)	156	4.2%

=== 2000 census ===
As of the census of 2000, there were 2,686 people, 1,080 households, and 723 families residing in the CDP. The population density was 871.8 inhabitants per square mile (336.6/km^{2}). There were 1,128 housing units at an average density of 366.1 per square mile (141.4/km^{2}). The racial makeup of the CDP was 97.54% White, 0.56% African American, 0.07% Native American, 0.48% Asian, 0.30% from other races, and 1.04% from two or more races. Hispanic or Latino of any race were 1.60% of the population.

There were 1,080 households, out of which 32.8% had children under the age of 18 living with them, 51.9% were married couples living together, 11.3% had a female householder with no husband present, and 33.0% were non-families. 26.5% of all households were made up of individuals, and 5.2% had someone living alone who was 65 years of age or older. The average household size was 2.40 and the average family size was 2.91.

In the CDP, the population was spread out, with 24.3% under the age of 18, 5.0% from 18 to 24, 31.9% from 25 to 44, 26.2% from 45 to 64, and 12.6% who were 65 years of age or older. The median age was 39 years. For every 100 females, there were 91.4 males. For every 100 females age 18 and over, there were 87.1 males.

The median income for a household in the CDP was $60,690, and the median income for a family was $66,550. Males had a median income of $44,414 versus $37,679 for females. The per capita income for the CDP was $29,050. About 1.4% of families and 1.5% of the population were below the poverty line, including 2.3% of those under age 18 and none of those age 65 or over.

== Sites ==
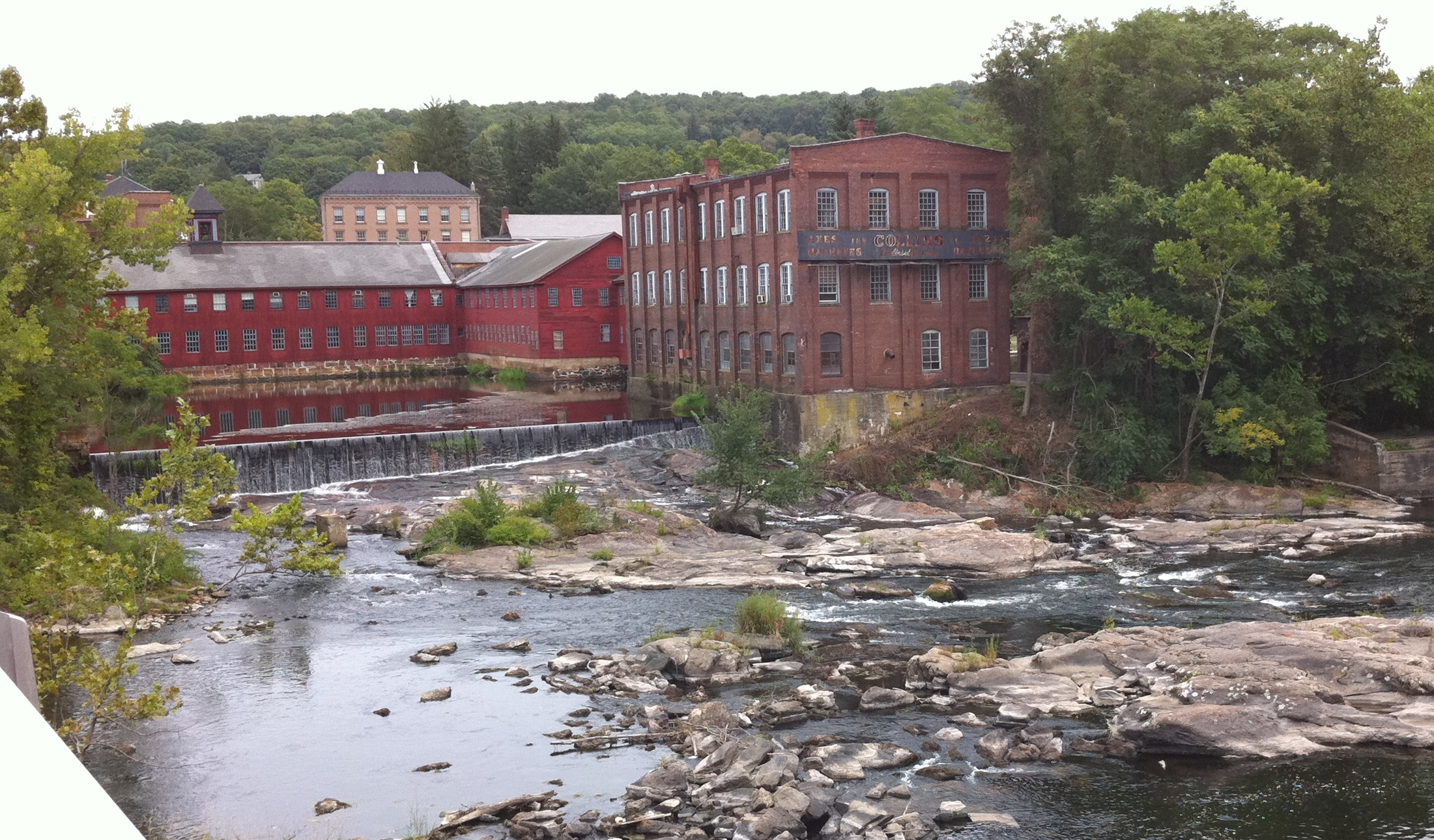
Some of the Collins Company factory buildings in Collinsville on the Farmington River, viewed from Connecticut Route 179

Collinsville is located directly on the Farmington River, and is a common place for people to walk and bike to, due to its convenient location along the Rails to Trails path. There are many cultural attractions in this town center.

The Canton Historical Museum is located in a former Collins Company factory building built in 1865. Originally constructed to finish and assemble agricultural plows, the building was converted in 1924 to a recreational facility for its employees. Fred Widen, a pattern maker for the company, used a portion of the building for his large collection of Collins memorabilia. Today, the Canton Historical Society owns the 14,000+ sq. ft. building and has a large assortment of Collins Tools, as well as many Victorian items, a general store, farm/agricultural equipment, children's toys, looms, and a Bridal Parlor featuring wedding dresses worn by Canton residents from the late 1800s. Also of interest, are several Regina music boxes, a large pump fire engine, used by the Collins Company, an Edison phonograph and Edison fans. Upstairs, the Farmington Valley Railroad Society operates a railroad diorama of the village of Collinsville around the start of the 20th century.

A research and genealogical library containing thousands of documents and photographs related to Canton and Collinsville history is also located upstairs, including black and white photos of the 1955 flood. Information about local cemeteries in Canton and Collinsville are available in the library. The museum covers three floors with limited handicap accessibility, but plans are underway to make the building more accessible in the future.

In the 19th century, a Collinsville butcher feuded with his neighbor. To spite his neighbor, the butcher built between their adjoining houses a narrow, two-story structure with windows covered by Venetian blinds. The wooden building located between 23 and 25 River Street was the width of a standard stairway and allowed the butcher to block the sun to the neighbor's home and block the neighbor's view of the butcher's property at will. The butcher's son got along with the family next door and eventually tore down the Collinsville Spite House.

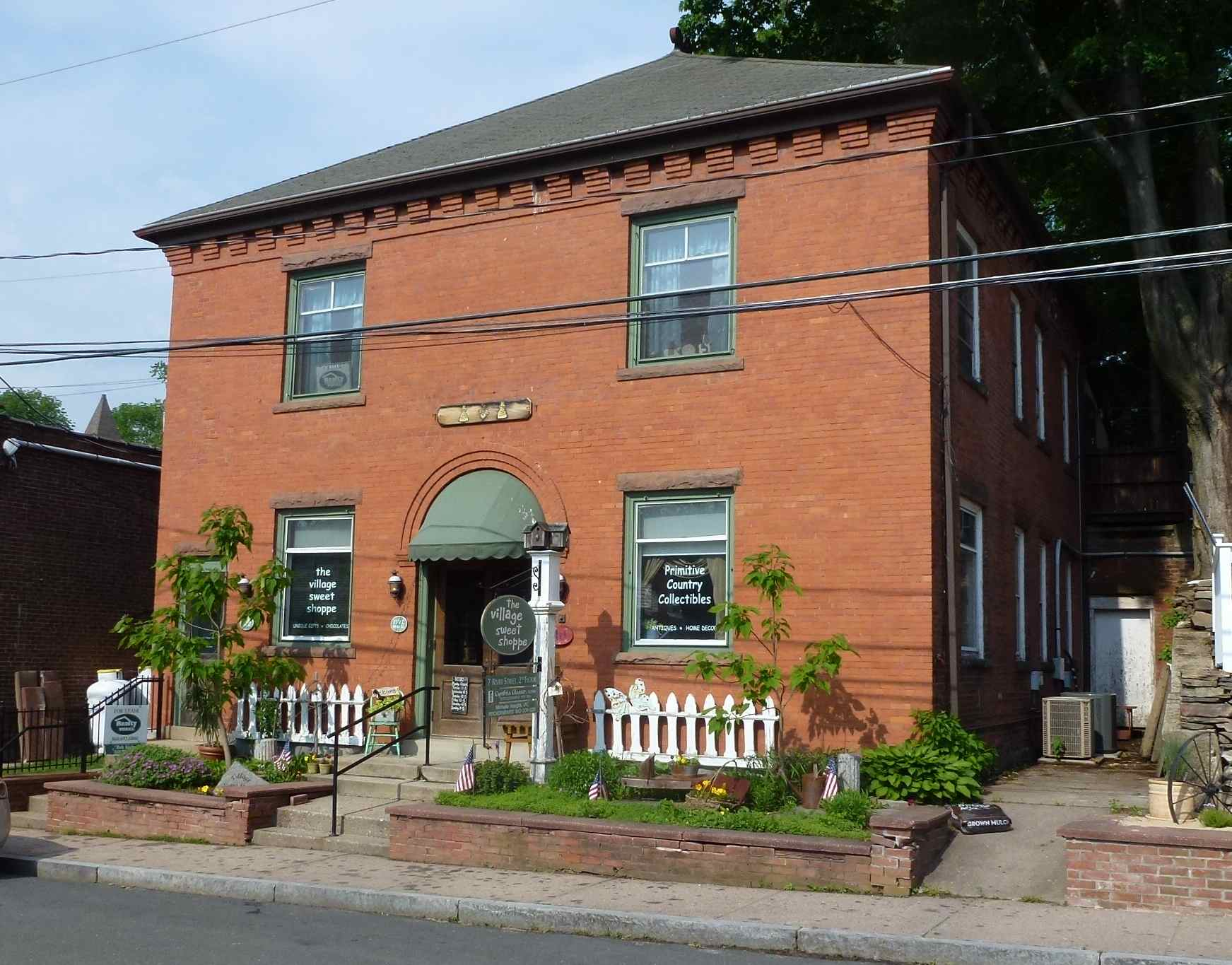
5 River Street

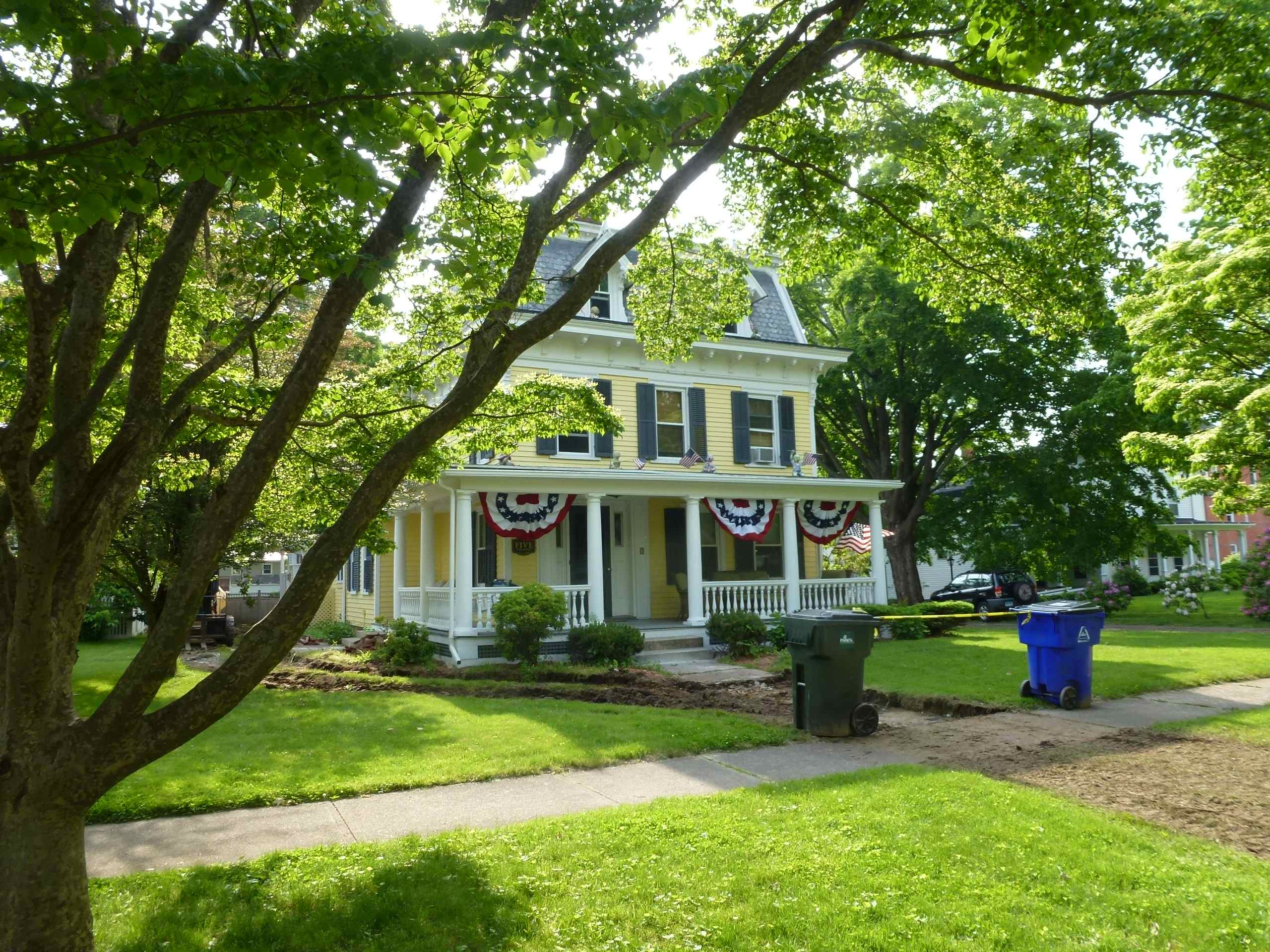
5 The Green

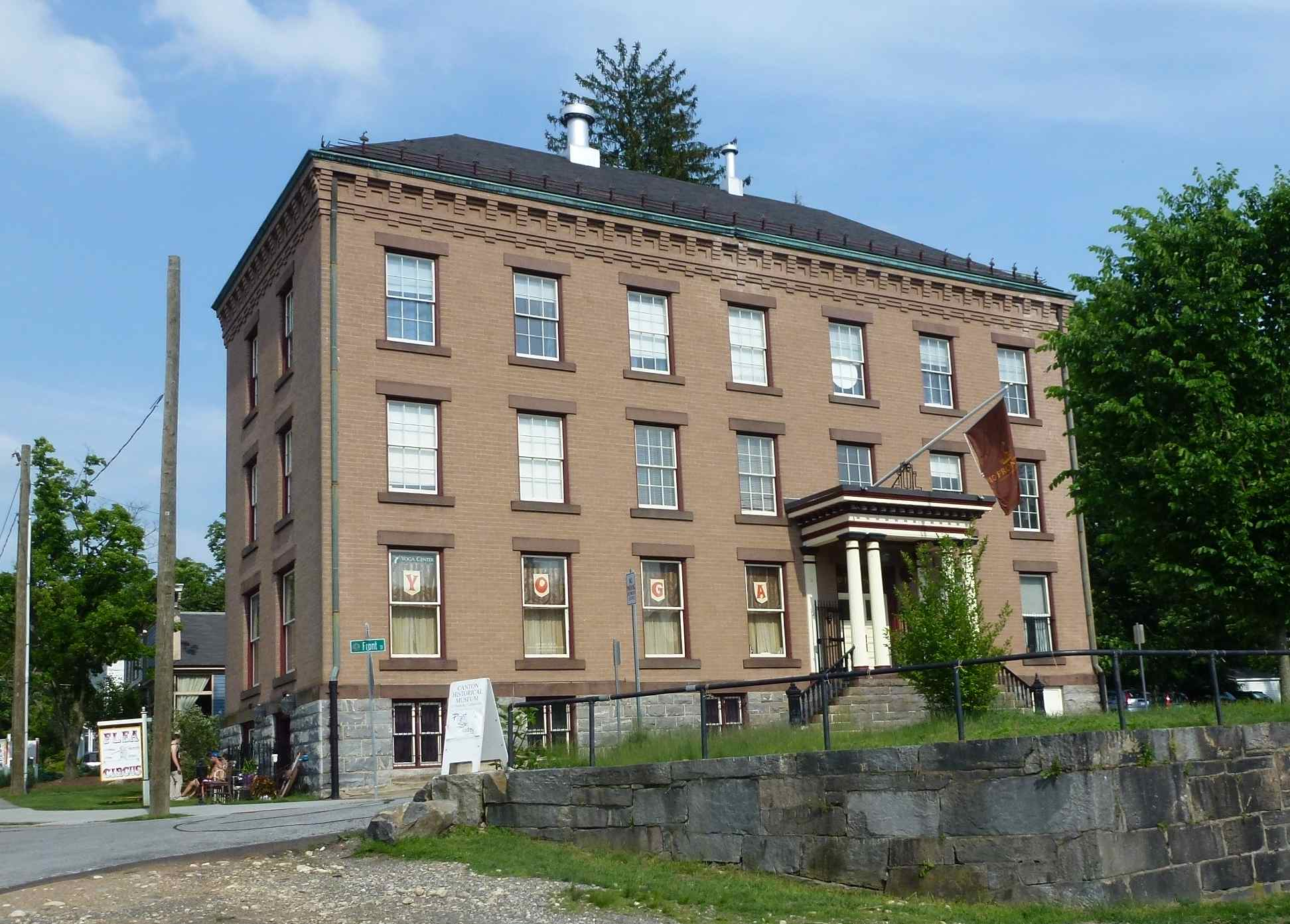
10 Front Street

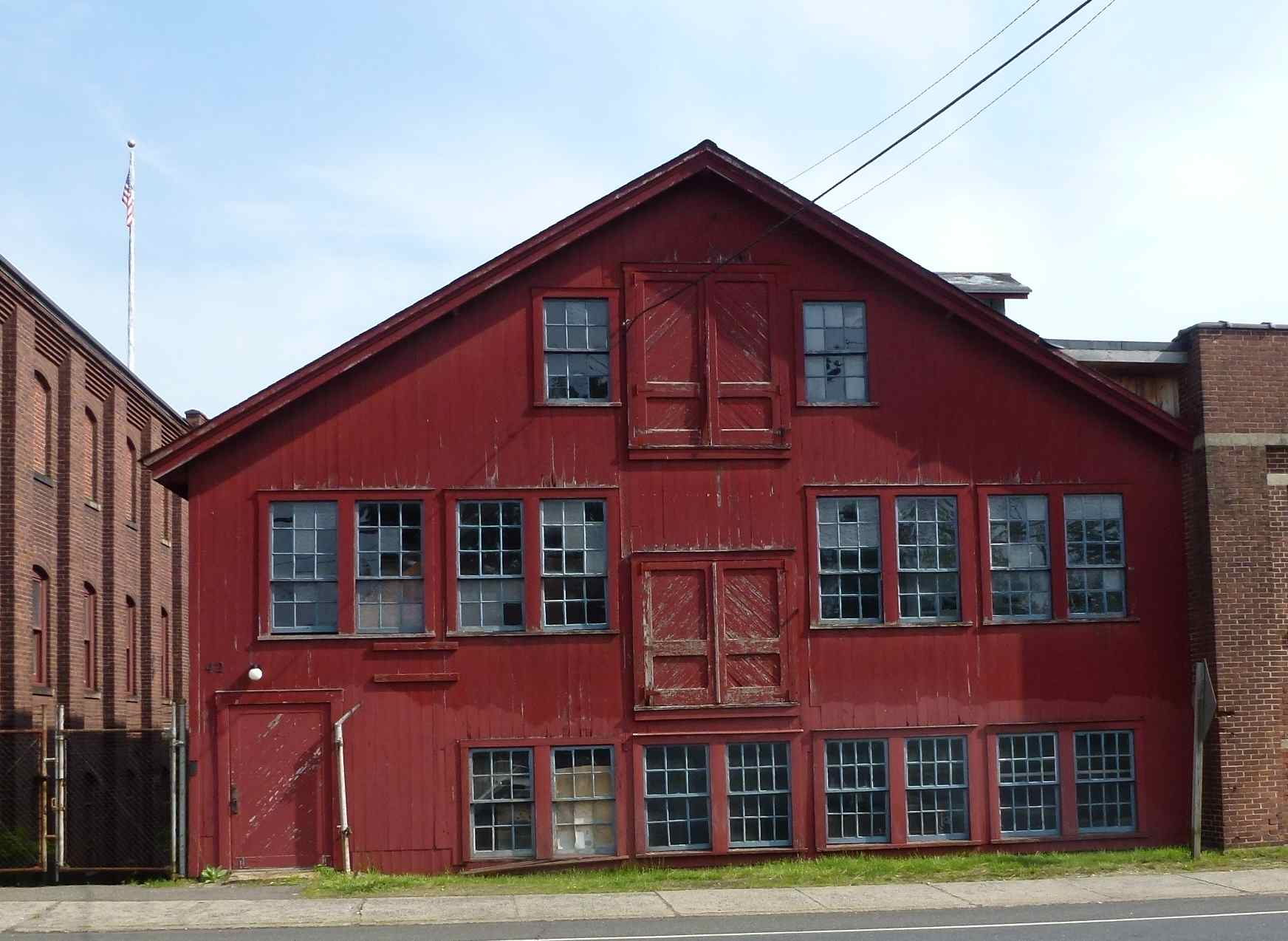
42 Bridge Street

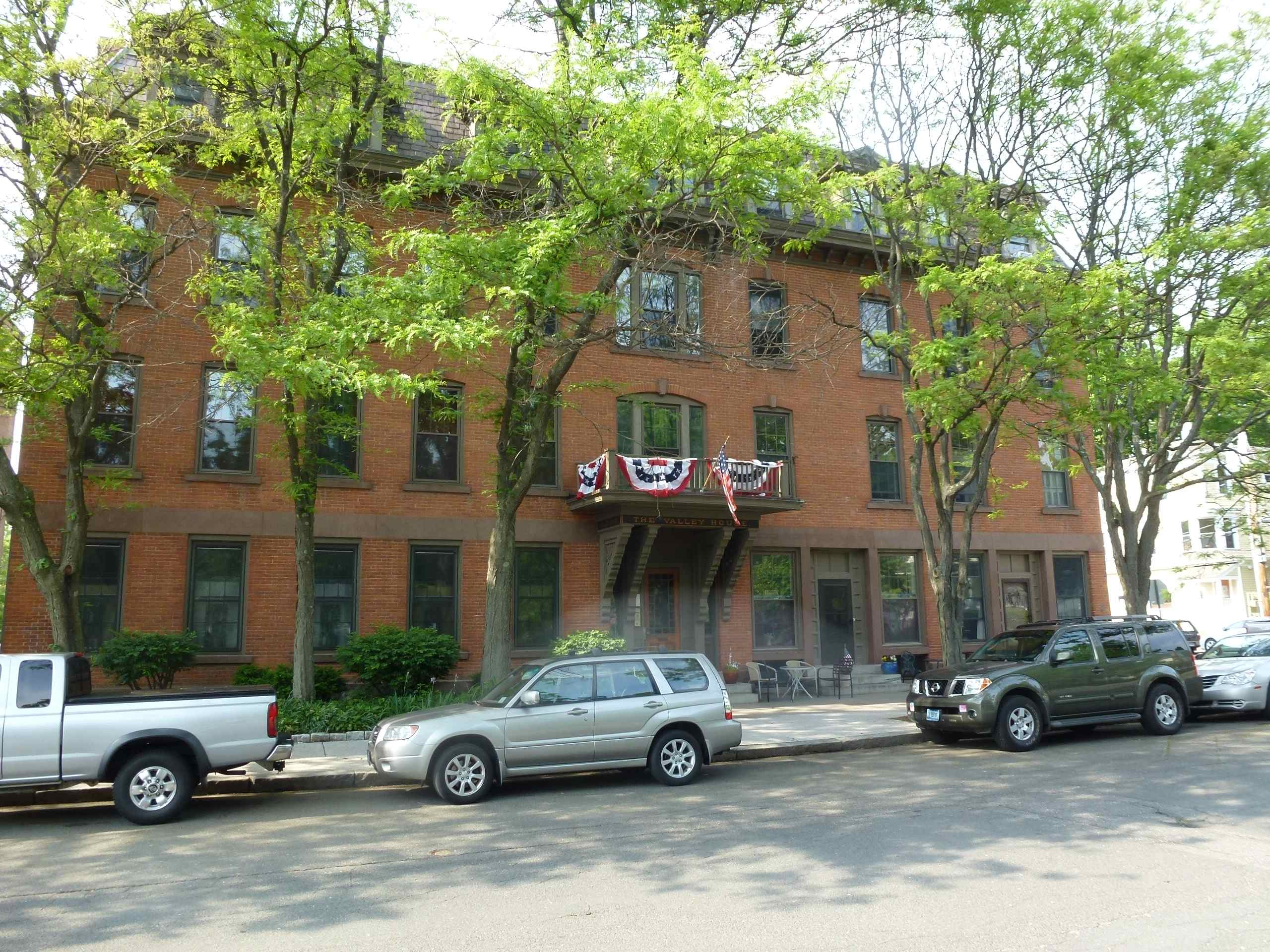
130 Main Street

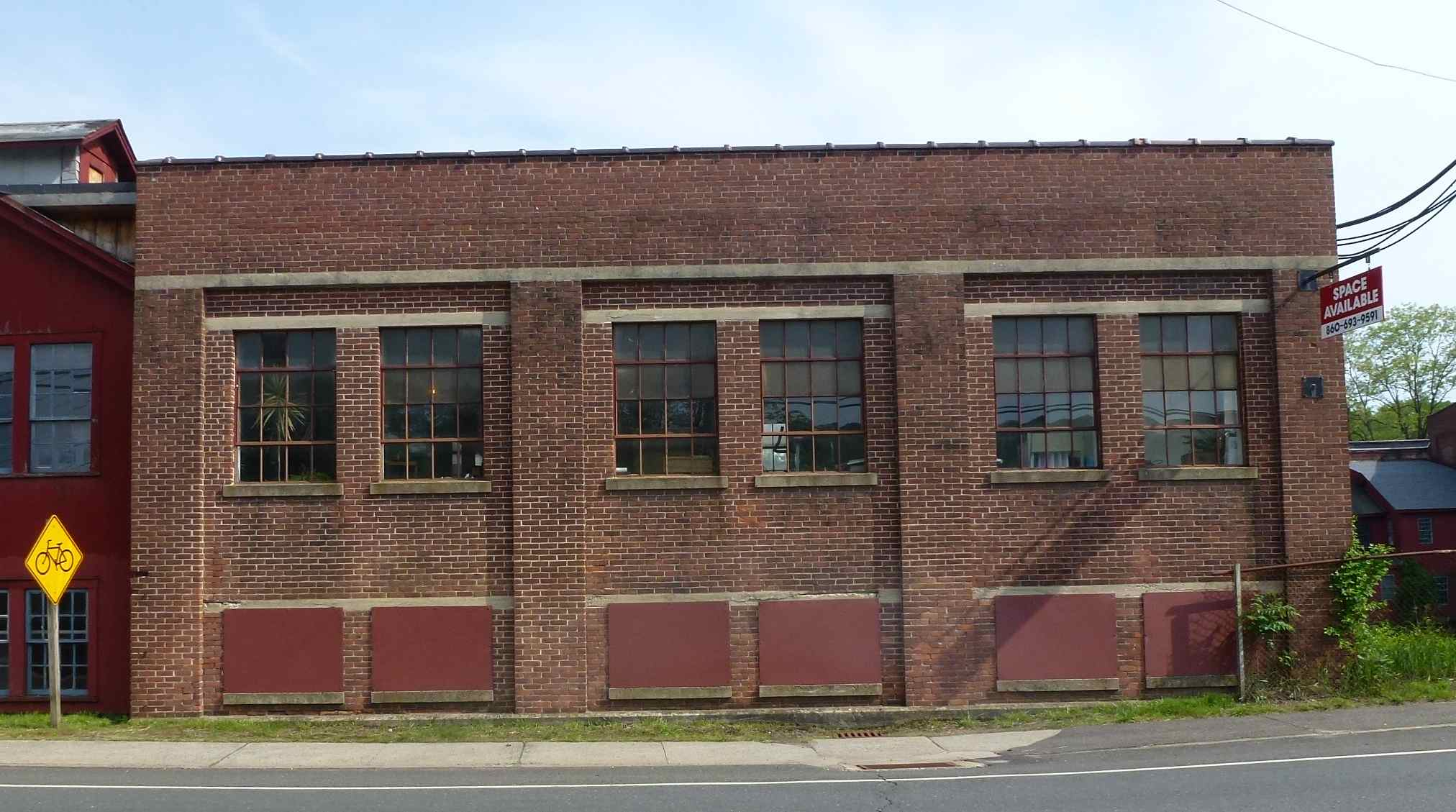
Bridge Street

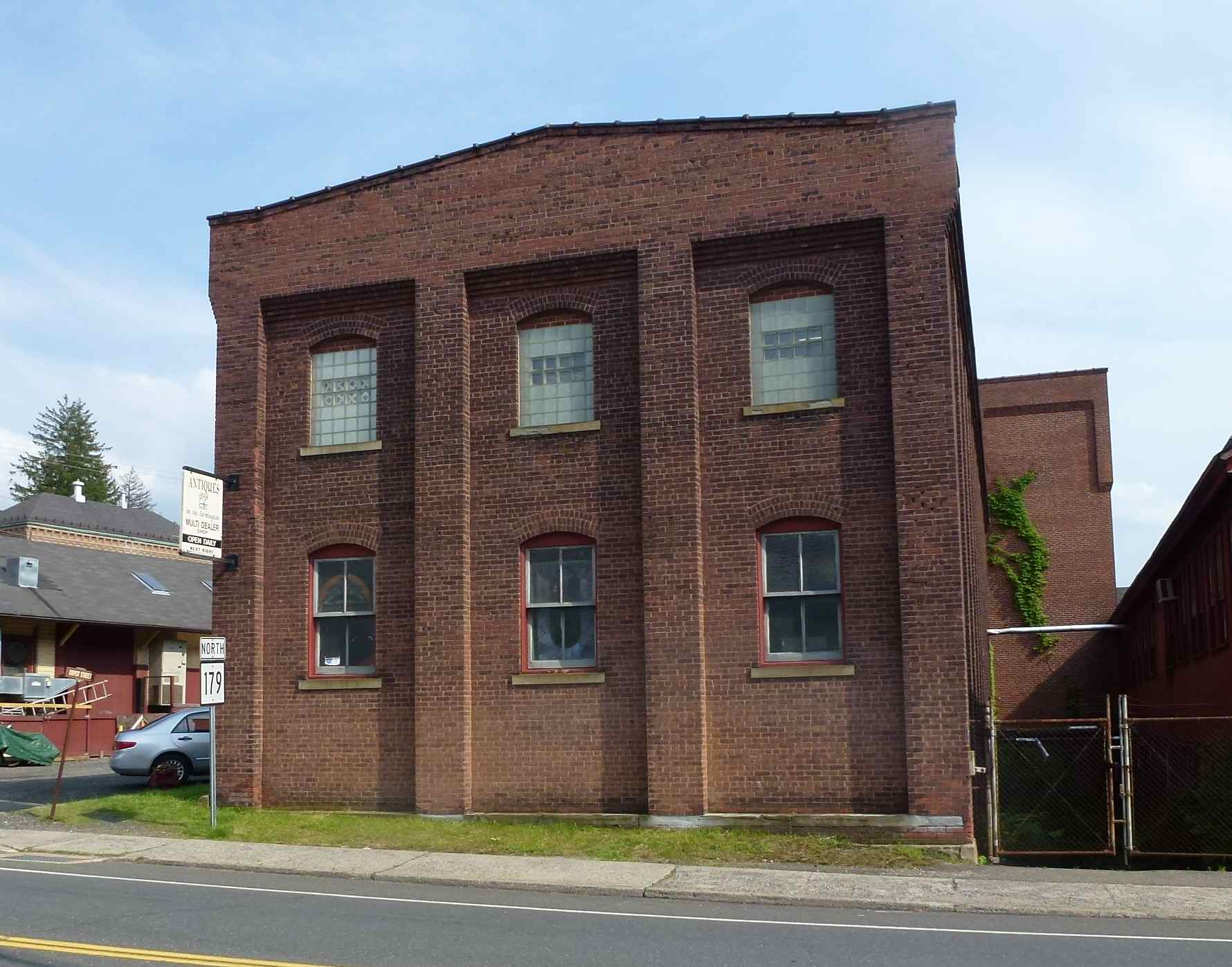
Bridge Street

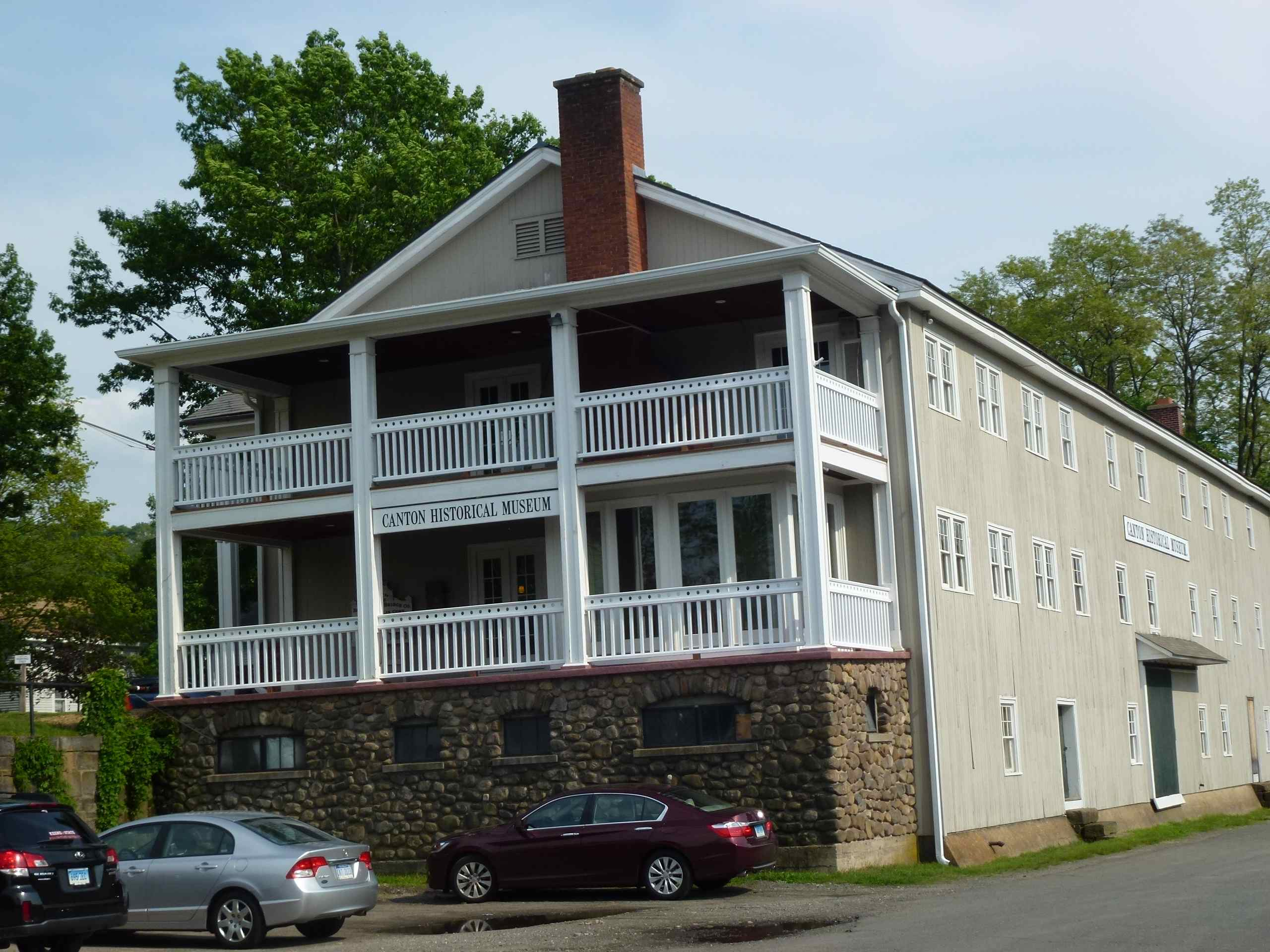
Canton Historical Museum

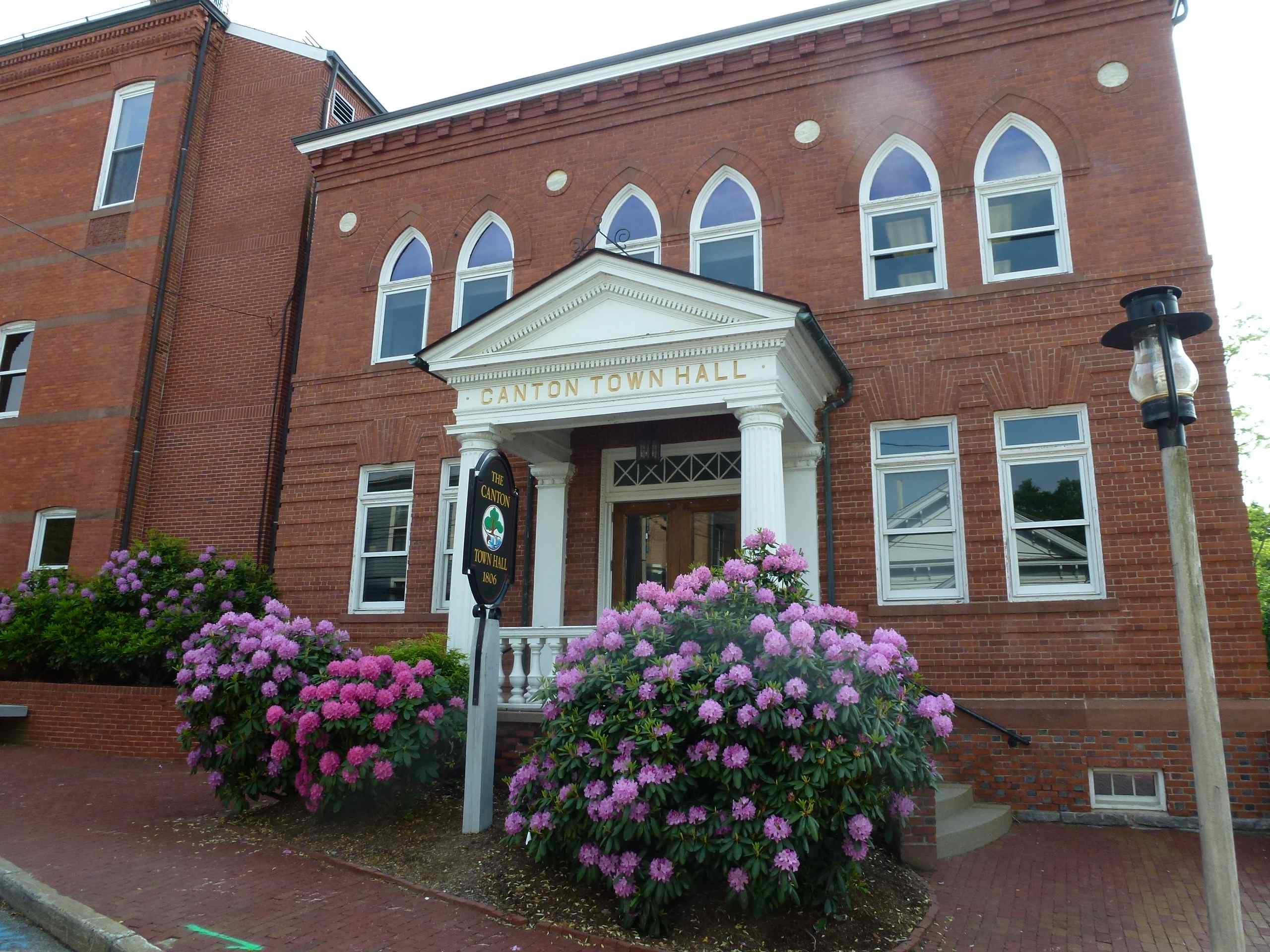
Canton Town Hall

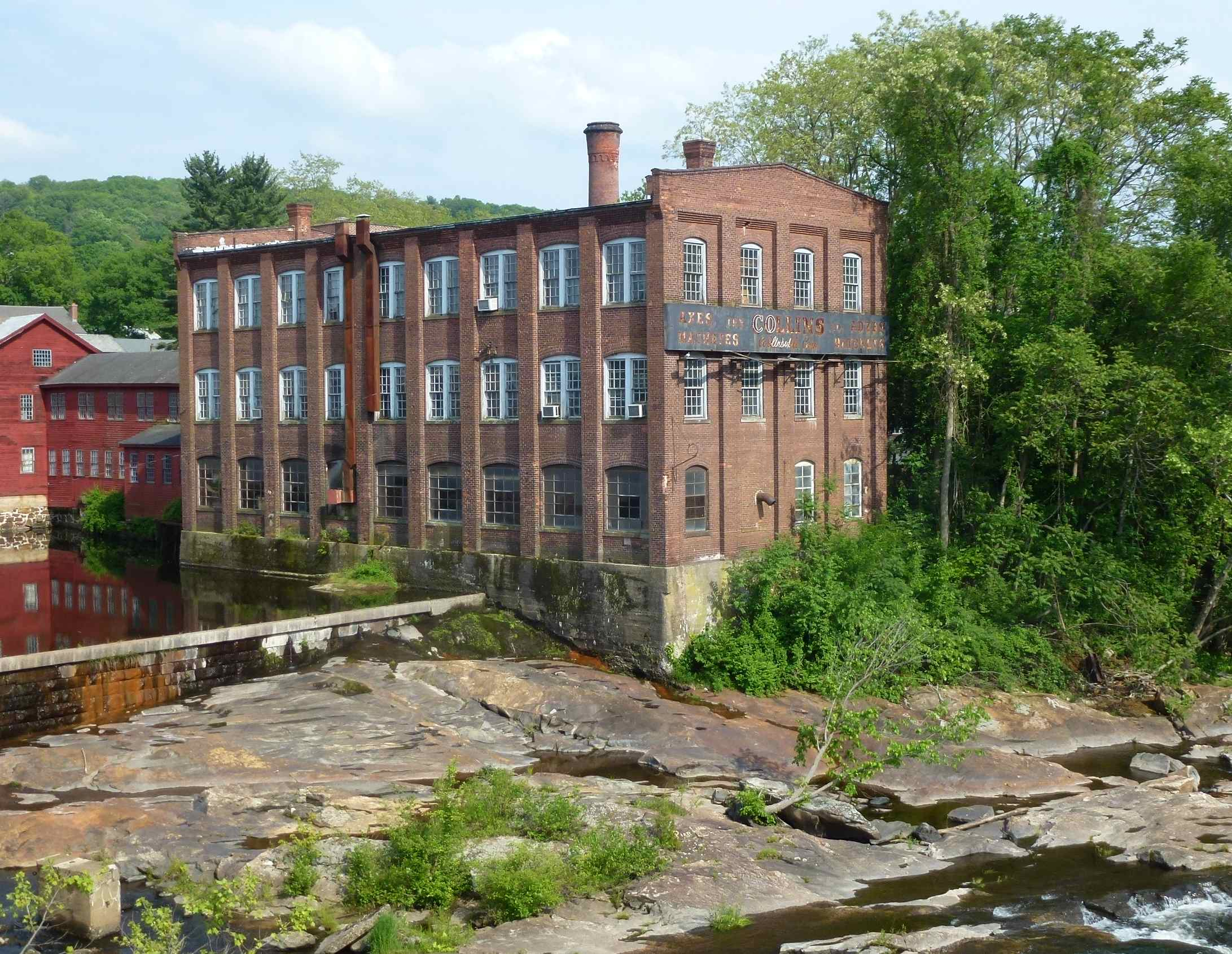
Collins Company axe factory

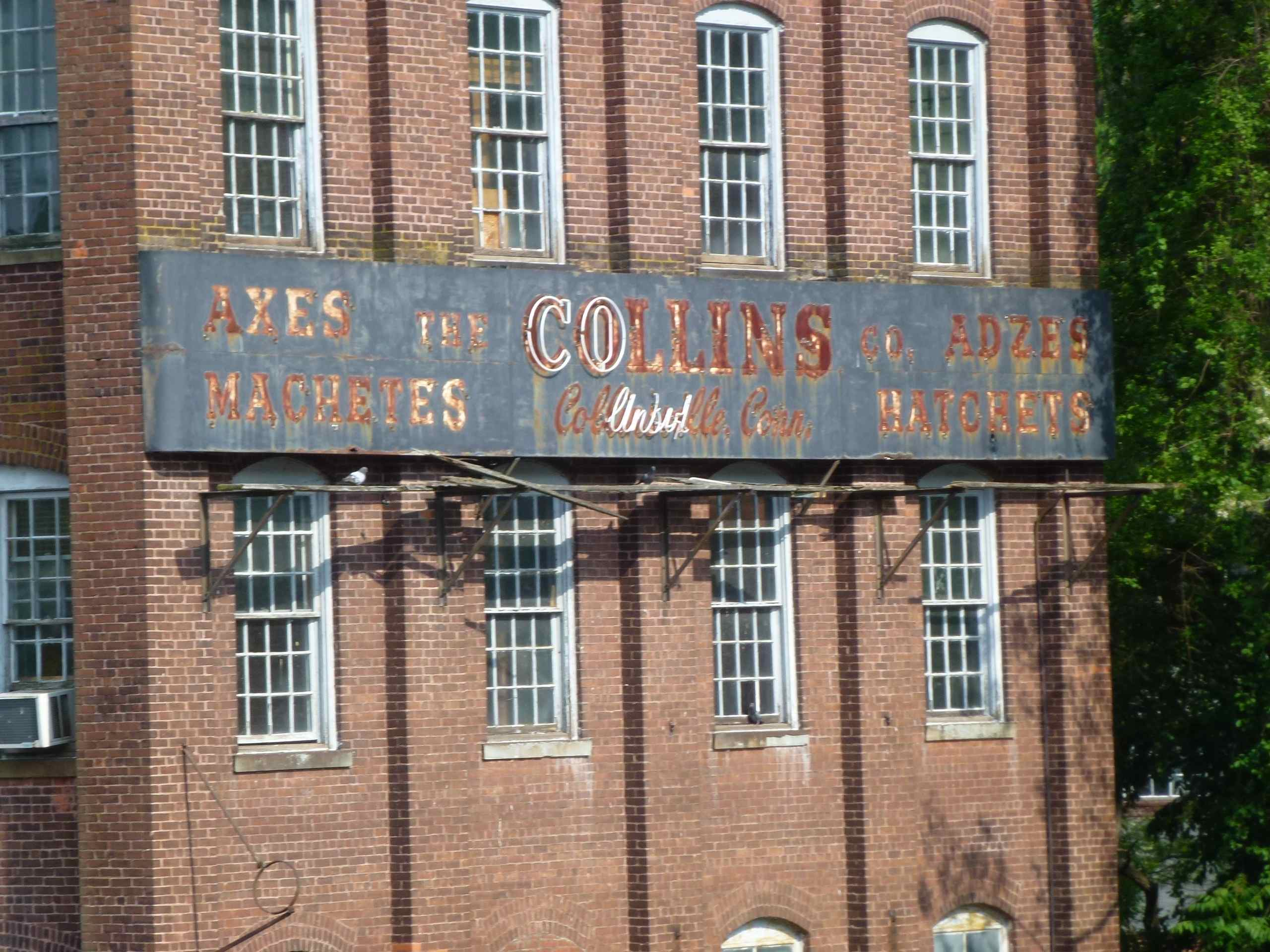
Collins Company axe factory sign

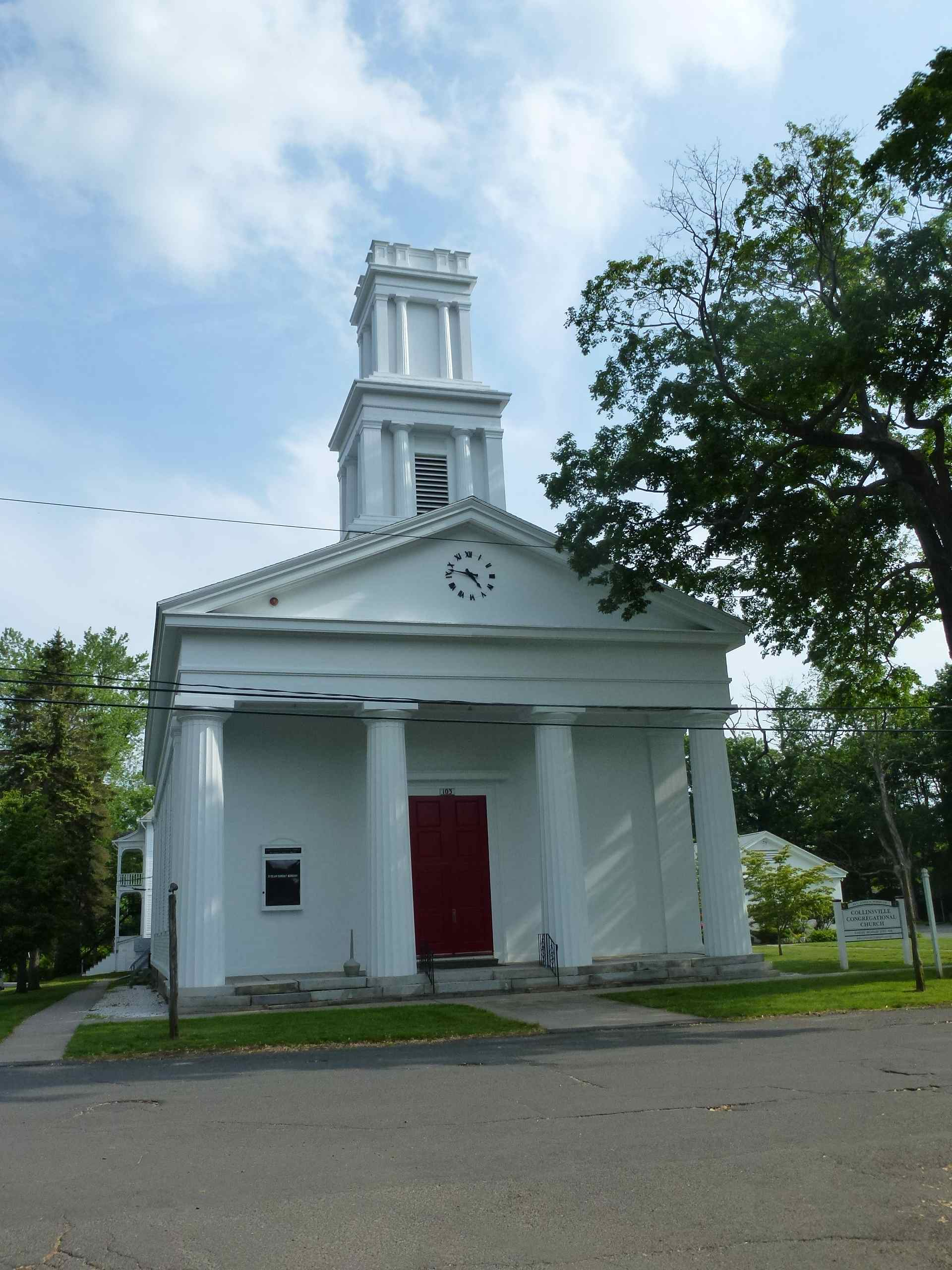
Collinsville Congregational Church

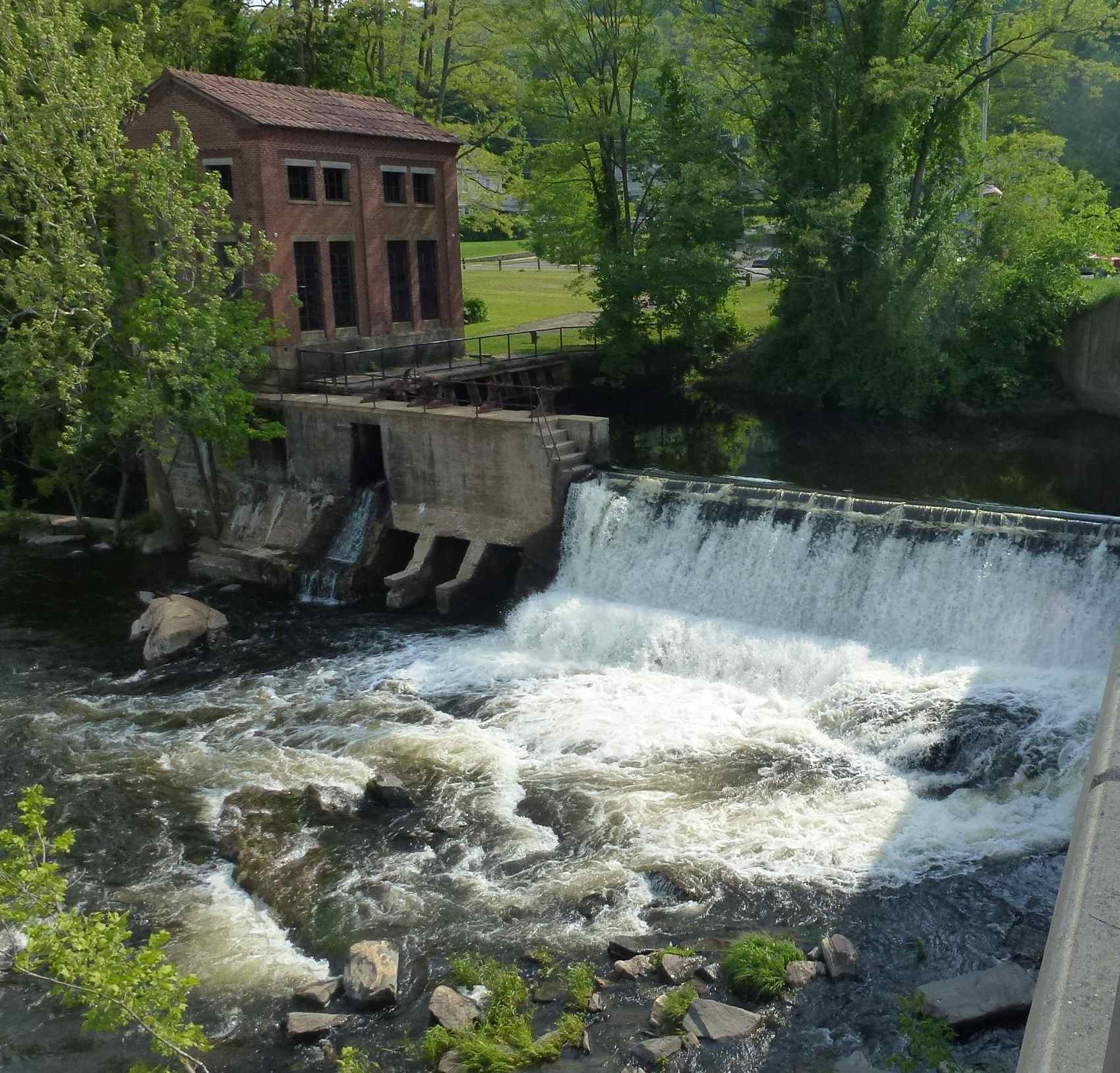
Farmington River spillway

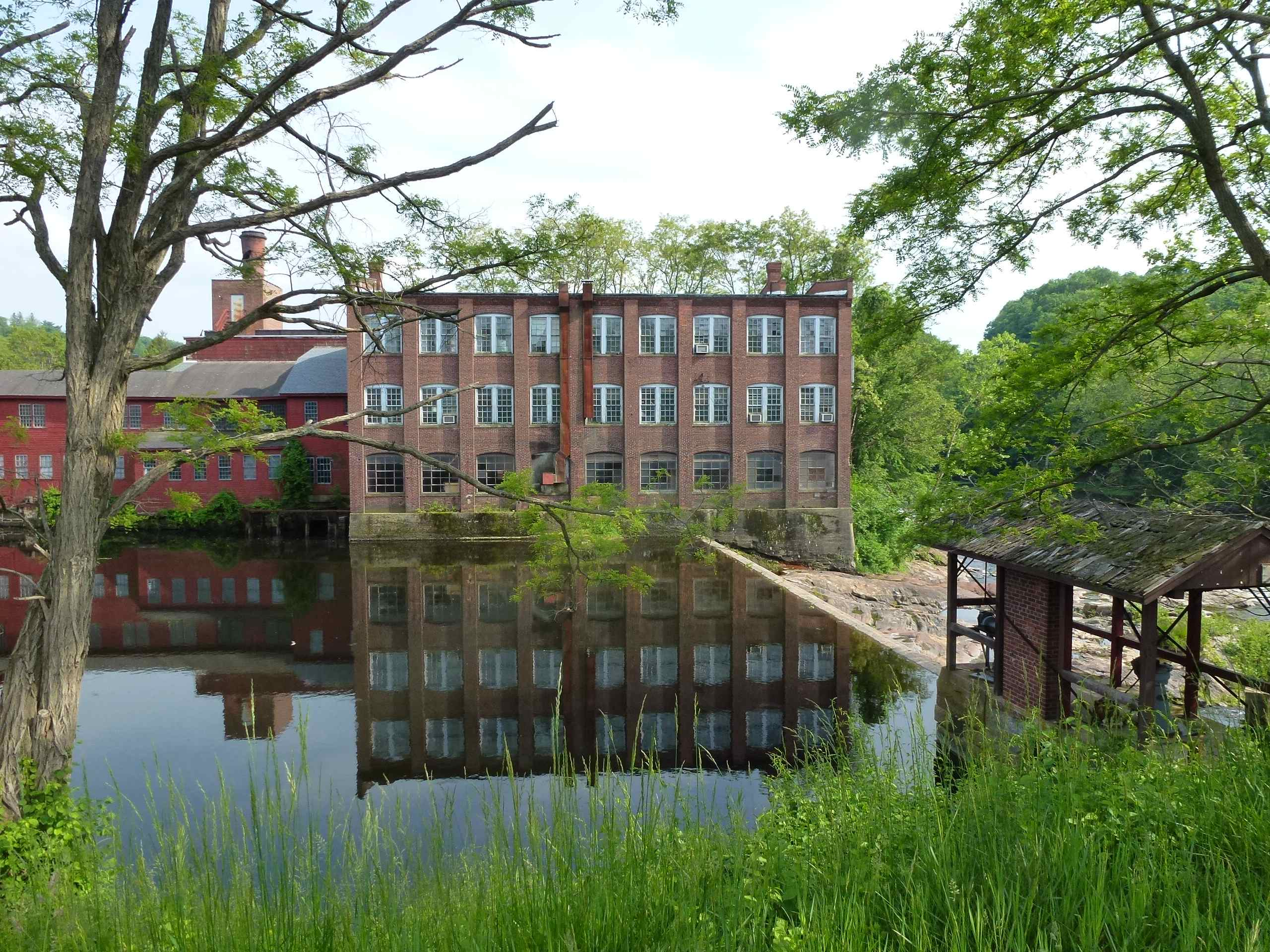
Mill complex Bridge street

== Notable residents ==
- Charles Codding (1861–1926), New Jersey legislator, was born in Collinsville
- George Washington Flint (1844–1921), second president of the University of Connecticut, attended high school in Collinsville

== See also ==
- National Register of Historic Places listings in Hartford County, Connecticut
