= Rufus W. Stimson =

3rd President of the University of Connecticut (1901–1908)

Rufus Whittaker Stimson
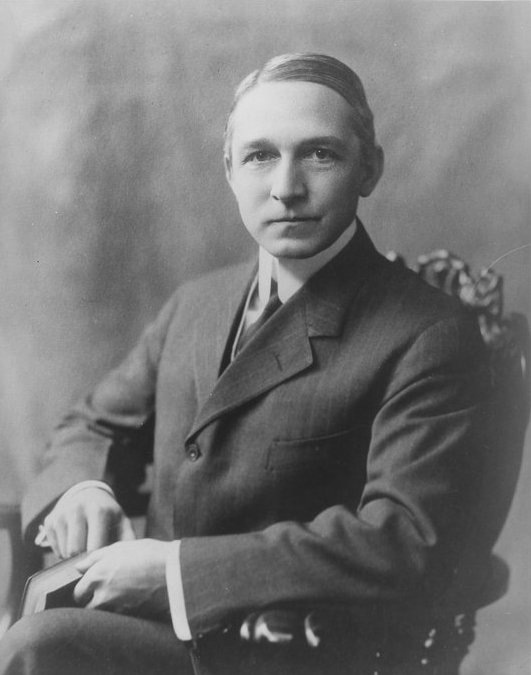

3rd President of the University of Connecticut
- In office 1901–1908
- Preceded by: George Washington Flint
- Succeeded by: Edwin O. Smith

Personal details
- Born: February 20, 1868 Palmer, Massachusetts
- Died: May 1, 1947 (aged 79) Hyannis, Massachusetts
- Education: Colby College; Harvard University (B.A., M.A.); Yale Divinity School (B.D.)
- Profession: Professor of English literature, academic administrator, agricultural educator

Rufus Whittaker Stimson (February 20, 1868 – May 1, 1947) was an American educator who served as the third president of the University of Connecticut (then Connecticut Agricultural College) from 1901 to 1908. Stimson was a major influence on the field of agricultural education.

== Early life and education ==
Stimson was born on February 20, 1868, on a farm near Palmer, Massachusetts. His parents were Horace W. Stimson and Harriet A. Hunt.

Stimson graduated from Palmer High School and attended Colby College for two years. He continued his studies at Harvard University, where he studied philosophy under William James and earned his bachelor's degree in 1895 and his master's degree, both in philosophy, in 1896.

He went on to receive his Bachelor of Divinity degree from the Yale Divinity School in 1897.

== Career at Connecticut Agricultural College ==
Stimson served as Professor of English at the Connecticut Agricultural College (now the University of Connecticut) from fall 1897 to 1901. He also taught ethics, rhetoric, and elocution. On October 5, 1901, college president George Washington Flint was forced to resign by the college's board of trustees, who immediately appointed Stimson as acting president. Stimson was made permanent president more than a year later.

Adept at managing public relations, Stimson quickly repaired relations with the state's agricultural communities, which had unraveled during Flint's tenure. In contrast to Flint's unpopular emphasis on classical education, Stimson maintained that "preparation for practical farming ... is the principal aim of the College." According to college historian Walter Stemmons, Stimson's tenure was "an era of good feeling and growth." Similarly, the Daily Campus student newspaper editorialized that "during his term of service the institution has made commendable progress."

State support and student enrollment increased during Stimson's tenure. Annual state appropriations rose and in 1905, the Connecticut General Assembly voted $60,000 to build Storrs Hall (a men's dormitory) and another $50,000 to construct a horticultural building and greenhouses. By 1907 the college had attracted a growing number of students from outside Connecticut, including from India, the West Indies, and Germany.

Stimson also ramped up summer school courses, consolidated Storrs Agricultural Experiment Station operations from Wesleyan University to Storrs, expanded the college's property by purchasing a hundred-acre farm in Storrs, and installed the college's first electric lights.

On February 20, 1908, Stimson presented his resignation to the college's board of trustees, effective at the end of the academic year. On April 25, 1908, trustees appointed E. O. Smith acting president. Stimson's permanent successor was Charles L. Beach.

== Later career ==
Stimson departed Connecticut Agricultural College to become director of Smith Agricultural School, a newly founded secondary school in Northampton, Massachusetts. Louisiana State University professor Gary E. Moore speculated that Stimson resigned to pursue the innovative project method of agricultural education he had developed, in which students received a formal education but applied what they learned on their home farms through use of practical projects. The Smith-Hughes Act of 1917 mandated these kind of supervised agricultural experiences. In 1919, Stimson published a textbook entitled Vocational Agricultural Education by Home Projects.

In 1911, Stimson became state supervisor of agricultural education for Massachusetts. He served in this position until he reached the mandatory retirement age of 70 and duly retired in 1938. The following year, the U.S. Office of Education hired him to write a history of agricultural education, giving him the title of research specialist. This book was published in 1942.

Stimson authored more than eighteen articles in the Agricultural Education Magazine and served as associate editor of the Vocational Education Magazine during the 1920s. He was president of the American Association for the Advancement of Agricultural Teaching (1913–1914) and vice president of Association of American Agricultural Colleges and Experiment Stations (1906–1907). He traveled across the United States to deliver seminars on agricultural education. He also campaigned unsuccessfully to admit girls to the National FFA Organization.

== Personal life ==
Stimson married Helen Morris (1867–1944) of Boston on October 4, 1899. The couple had no issue.

Helen Stimson coached the first season of the UConn Huskies women's basketball team, which went 2-0 in its first season playing against Willimantic High School.

Rufus Stimson died at the Cape Cod Hospital in Hyannis, Massachusetts, on May 1, 1947. He was survived by his sister and four brothers, as well as many nieces and nephews.

Academic offices
Preceded by George Washington Flint	3rd President of the University of Connecticut; 1901-1908	Succeeded by Edwin O. Smith
