= William Arnon Henry =

American professor (1850–1932)

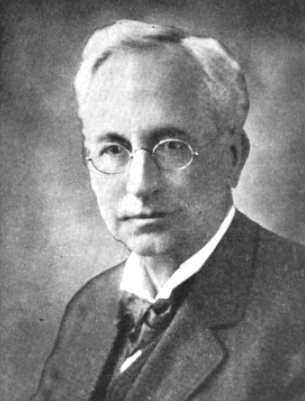
- Born: June 16, 1850; Norwalk, Ohio
- Died: November 24, 1932 (aged 82); San Diego, California
- Education: National Normal University; Ohio Wesleyan University
- Occupations: Academic, agriculturist

William Arnon Henry (June 16, 1850 – November 24, 1932) was an American academic and agriculturist from Ohio. Henry studied at the National Normal University and Ohio Wesleyan University before becoming a principal of two high schools. After continuing his education at Cornell University from 1876 to 1880, Henry was appointed a professor at the University of Wisconsin. There, he led the growth of the College of Agriculture, becoming its first dean in 1891. He remained at the university until 1907, when he was named a professor emeritus.

== Biography ==
William Arnon Henry was born in Norwalk, Ohio, on June 16, 1850. As a child, he helped on the family farm and attended a public school in Defiance. Henry attended the National Normal University, teaching to earn money to pay for tuition. He matriculated at Ohio Wesleyan University in 1869, studying there for a year. In 1871, Henry was named the principal of New Haven High School in New Haven, Indiana, which he led until taking a similar position with Boulder High School in Boulder, Colorado, in 1873.

Henry remained at Boulder until 1876, when he became a student of the College of Agriculture and Life Sciences at Cornell University. During the summer before his senior year, Henry worked as an assistant to Charles Valentine Riley at the United States Entomological Commission. During his last year, he was an instructor of botany at Cornell. He received a bachelor's degree in 1880.

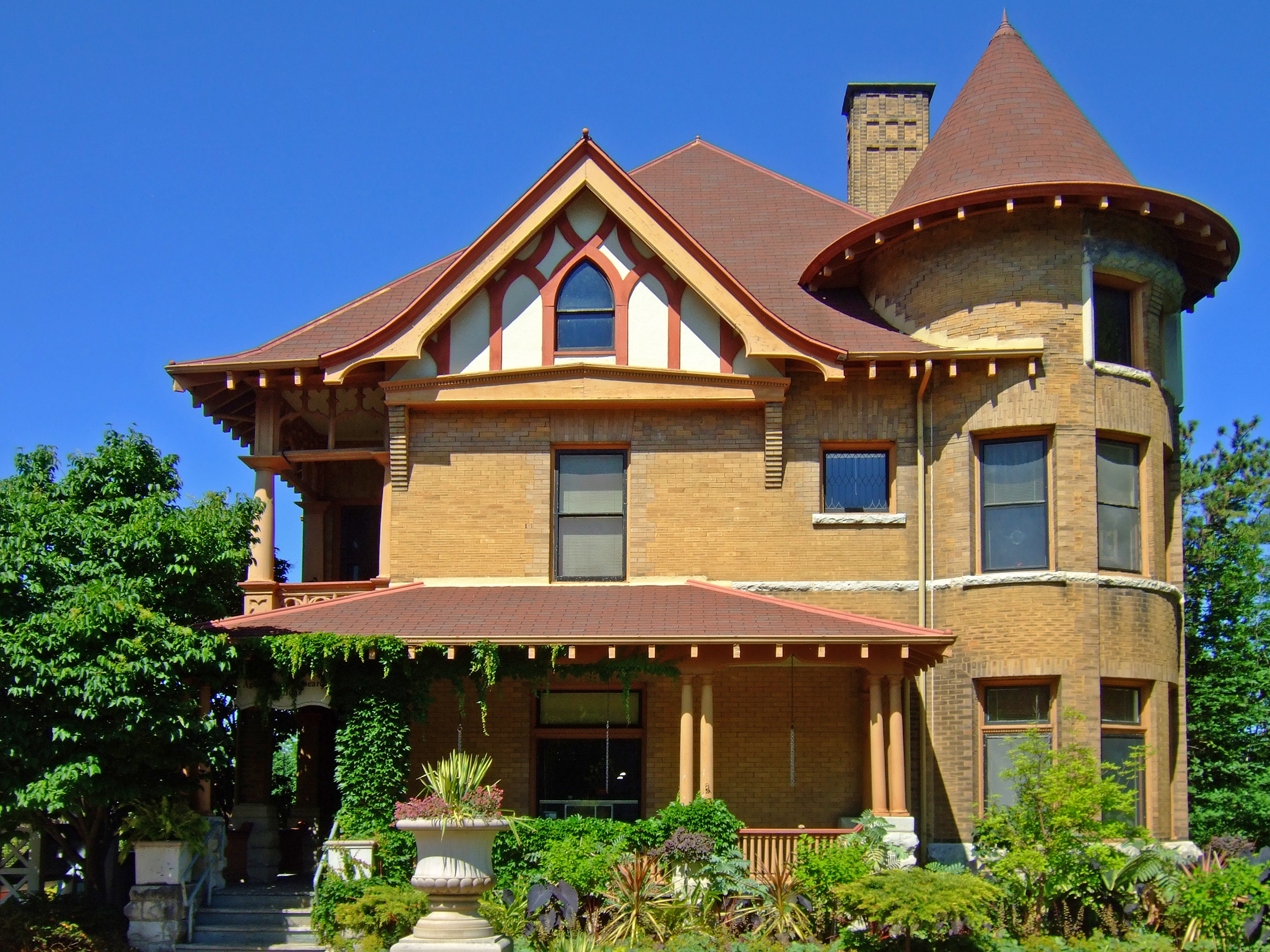
Henry had a house built on campus for the dean of agriculture.

Upon graduation, Henry was named professor of botany and agriculture at the University of Wisconsin. He married Clara R. Taylor in 1881. Henry was commissioned by the Wisconsin State Assembly to study silage and the production of sugar from amber cane. In 1883, he was relieved of his botanical studies so that he could focus on building the College of Agriculture. He was appointed director of the Wisconsin Agricultural Experiment Station in 1887 and then was named the first dean of the agricultural school in 1891. Under Henry, Wisconsin founded the first short course in agriculture and the first dairy school.

Henry retired in 1907, becoming a professor emeritus. He received honorary degrees from the University of Illinois, University of Vermont, and Michigan State University. He had one son, Arnon. Henry died on November 24, 1932, at his sister's home in San Diego, California.
