= Henry P. Armsby =

American agricultural chemist and animal nutritionist (1853–1921)

Henry Prentiss Armsby
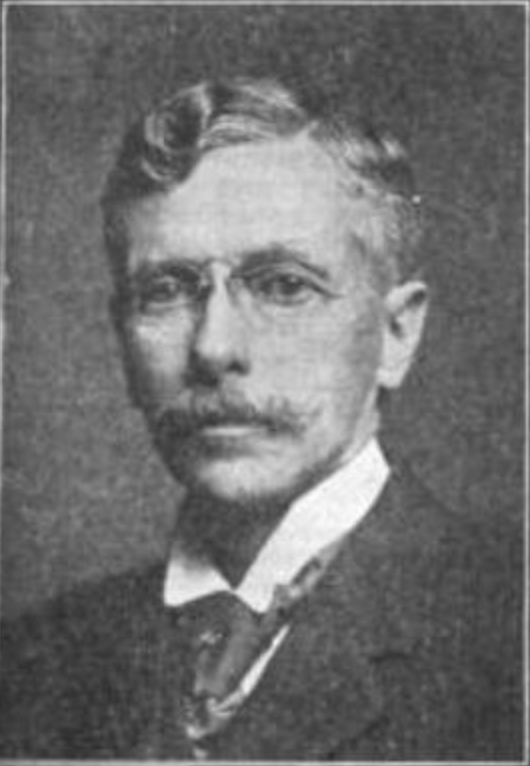

Acting Principal of Storrs Agricultural School (University of Connecticut)
- In office 1882–1883
- Preceded by: Solomon Mead
- Succeeded by: Benjamin F. Koons

Personal details
- Born: September 21, 1853 Northbridge, Massachusetts
- Died: October 19, 1921 (aged 68) State College, Pennsylvania
- Spouse: Lucy Atwood Harding
- Education: Worcester Polytechnic Institute (B.S.); Yale University (B.A., PhD)
- Profession: Agricultural chemistry, animal nutrition, academic administration

Henry Prentiss Armsby (September 21, 1853 – October 19, 1921) was an American agricultural chemist, animal nutritionist, and academic administrator. He served as Vice Principal and Acting Principal of the Storrs Agricultural School (1881–1883), associate director of the Wisconsin Agricultural Experiment Station (1883–1887), and director of the Agricultural Experiment Station (1887–1907) and the Institute of Animal Nutrition (1907–1921) at the Pennsylvania State University.

== Early life and education ==
Armsby was born in Northbridge, Massachusetts, on September 21, 1853, the only child of cabinetmaker Lewis Armsby and Mary A. Prentiss. Armsby earned his Bachelor of Science degree from Worcester County Free Institute of Industrial Science in 1871 and taught chemistry there for a year. He studied for two years at Yale University's Sheffield Scientific School, graduating in 1874 with his Bachelor of Philosophy degree.

Following his studies at Yale, Armsby taught natural sciences at Fitchburg High School for one year. He spent the subsequent year conducting intensive research in the German city of Leipzig. Following his return to the United States, Armsby taught chemistry at Rutgers College in New Jersey from 1876 to 1877.

In 1877, Samuel William Johnson hired Armsby to work as a chemist at the newly formed Connecticut Agricultural Experiment Station—the first in the nation—in New Haven. Armsby worked alongside Johnson's other assistant, Edward Hopkins Jenkins. He worked at the Station for four years, earned his PhD from Yale in 1879, and wrote the textbook Manual of Cattle Feeding (1880), a staple in the field of animal nutrition.

== Career ==
In August 1881, Armsby accepted the position of Vice Principal and Professor of Agricultural Chemistry at Storrs Agricultural School, established by the Connecticut General Assembly earlier that year. Following Solomon Mead's retirement in 1882, Armsby was appointed acting principal. During a speech to the Connecticut Board of Agriculture that year, he championed the civic, scientific, and economic value of the school as a venue to produce successful farmers and community leaders. The school, he declared, was not an "asylum for incapables." His short tenure was "somewhat in the nature of marking time," according to one biographer. In 1883, Armsby resigned and Benjamin F. Koons was appointed principal beginning the winter term of 1883.

Immediately following his departure from Storrs Agricultural School, Armsby served as Professor of Agricultural Chemistry and Associate Director and Chemist of the Wisconsin Agricultural Experiment Station from 1883 to 1887.

In 1887, Armsby accepted the position of Director of the newly formed Agriculture Experiment Station at Pennsylvania State College. He remained director until 1907, when at his request he was relieved of most administrative duties to focus on research, becoming director of Penn State's new Institute of Animal Nutrition. He led the Institute until his death in 1921. Between 1895 and 1902, he pulled double duty as dean of the College of Agricultural Sciences. According to the American Journal of Nutrition, "he and Penn State grew up together." Armsby was a prolific researcher, authoring more than 115 scientific publications.

Armsby was internationally renowned for creating an animal respiration calorimeter, which increased efficiency of cattle feeding, in 1901. This nutrition experiment station enabled Armsby to determine how much energy beef cattle and sheep derived from a given food source, measuring respiration, feed intake, water intake, and excrement. The device was based on a design by Wilbur O. Atwater, originally intended for human nutritional research. The first device of its kind in the world, the Armsby Calorimeter attracted visitors from all over the world and bolstered Penn State University's reputation.

Active in professional associations, Armsby served as the first president of the American Society of Animal Production (1908–1911), president of the Association of American Agricultural Colleges and Experiment Stations (1899), and president of the Society for the Promotion of Agricultural Science (1905–1907). He served on the editorial committee of the Journal of Agricultural Research (1914–1919). He also served on the Inter-Allied Scientific Food Commission during World War I.

== Awards ==
Armsby received widespread recognition during his lifetime. He received honorary doctorates from the University of Wisconsin (1904), Yale University (1920), and Worcester Polytechnic Institute (1921). He was elected a member of the National Academy of Sciences, the Royal Society of Arts, and the Royal Swedish Academy of Agriculture and Forestry. He won a gold medal at the Panama-Pacific International Exposition in 1915 for his model of the calorimeter he had designed at Penn State. A U.S. Department of Agriculture report called him "the foremost exponent of research in the field of animal nutrition in the country and an international authority."

Built in 1905, the Armsby Building on Penn State's campus was named in his honor in 1956. His papers are held at Penn State.

== Personal life ==
Contemporaries described Armsby as reserved, modest, conscientious, gracious, and hardworking. His hobbies included bridge whist, golf, tennis, and horseback riding. He worked long hours even when his health suffered in consequence. He was a researcher first and foremost and felt administrative responsibilities to be irksome.

Armsby married Lucy Atwood Harding of Millbury, Massachusetts, on October 15, 1878. The couple had five sons: Charles Lewis, Ernest Harding, Sidney Prentiss, Henry Horton, and Edward McClellan, all of whom eventually graduated from Pennsylvania State University and several of whom became academics themselves.

Armsby died of a stroke at his home on October 19, 1921. He was interred at Pine Hall Cemetery near State College. He was survived by his wife and sons.

Academic offices
Preceded by Solomon Mead	Acting Principal of Storrs Agricultural College; University of Connecticut; 1882-1883	Succeeded by Benjamin F. Koons
