= Farm and Industry Short Course =

The University of Wisconsin–Madison College of Agricultural and Life Sciences offers the one- or two-year Farm and Industry Short Course (FISC) program to high school graduates interested in farming or one of Wisconsin’s many other agricultural industries. The program runs from November to April and has an average enrollment of 135 students.

The program’s instructional goals emphasize a combination of academics and hands-on experience, taught by faculty and staff, many of whom also teach in the four-year undergraduate program.

== History ==
In 2010, the University of Wisconsin-Madison Farm and Industry Short Course will have been active for 125 years.

=== College of Agriculture an "IDEA" ===
On Sept. 1, 1880, William Arnon Henry began his service as Dean with the University of Wisconsin. University President John Bascom assigned Dean Henry the task of establishing the College of Agriculture as part of the university. Henry had little to work with except some acreage of farmland and the mandate to establish a training program that would be useful to young farmers.

Several farm organizations which were active at that time-the State Agriculture Society, the State Horticulture Society, the State Grange of the Patrons of Husbandry, and the State Dairymen's Association-greatly influenced the development of the College of Agriculture. These organizations, rather than individual farmers, really determined the form and function of the College of Agriculture.

Young farmers were not clamoring for college training, nor were operating farmers asking for what later became Extension services. Quoting Henry: "I found, upon coming to the state university, that we had no agriculture department, unless you can call a farm an agriculture department. We had no buildings; we had no room even in the buildings, we had no museum, we had no appropriations, excepting the farm...as for the education of the farmer, since there was not a young man in the institution studying agriculture, I felt that I was wholly alone in my work".

Henry listed his expenditures as $3,560.56 for the farm, $1,200 for his own salary, and $2,500 for mechanical arts-this latter not an agriculture item.

=== Creation of Short Course ===
In 1885, the University of Wisconsin Regents accepted the report of a two-man committee consisting of William T. Vilas, a "lawyer of high degree", and H.D. Hitt, a farmer from Oakfeild, who was a prominent Granger. Their recommendation was "that a shorter course for the winter months confined to the terms of two years, would be more popular and appropriate." This report was unanimously adopted, and the Farm Short Course (as it was then called) was mandated on January 20, 1885.

The Short Course was the first strictly agricultural course to be given in the state, and was in session by January 1886. The course covered a period of 12 weeks and embraced 60 lectures, each on some phase of agriculture, agricultural chemistry, and agricultural botany. Twenty-four lectures were held on veterinary science.

The faculty consisted of four instructors: Professor Henry (Agriculture), Professor H.B. Armsby (Chemistry), Professor A.B. Seymour (Botany), and Dr. T.Y. Atkinson, State Veterinarian (Veterinary Science). The lectures and instruction were very practical, embracing such subjects as Climate and Agricultural Resources of Different Sections of the United States; Livestock; Land Drainage; Farm Crops; Farm Building; Roads and Road Making; Farm Accounts; Stock Feeding; Milk; Manures; Fertilizers, Tillage; Plant Diseases; Weeds; Grasses; Diseases of Animals and their Treatment.

The Program was designed to make these courses useful to those whose means and time were limited, and who wanted the knowledge to successfully conduct a farm business. The courses were made up so all the work was completed in one winter's term, but anyone so desiring, might devote his whole time to any one of four specialties offered.

Requirements were that students in the course should be at least 16 years old, and have a common school education. While no entrance examinations were required, those students who came poorly prepared could not expect to receive the full benefits of the course.

The expenses for the winter term of the Short Course were about $65 "for the economical student," including board, incidental fees and books. Most students had to locate and pay for rooming facilities.

== Courses ==
Over 50 courses are offered annually in the areas of soils, crops, dairy, meat animals, general livestock, landscaping, agricultural engineering and agricultural economics. Students may earn a one-year or two-year certificate requiring 20 or 40 credits, respectively, or they may pursue a specialty certificate in one of seven areas: Crop and Soil Management, Dairy Farm Management, Farm Mechanics, Farm Service and Supply, Landscape Industry, Meat Animals, or Pasture-Based Dairy and Livestock.
