= McIndoes Academy =

- U.S. National Register of Historic Places
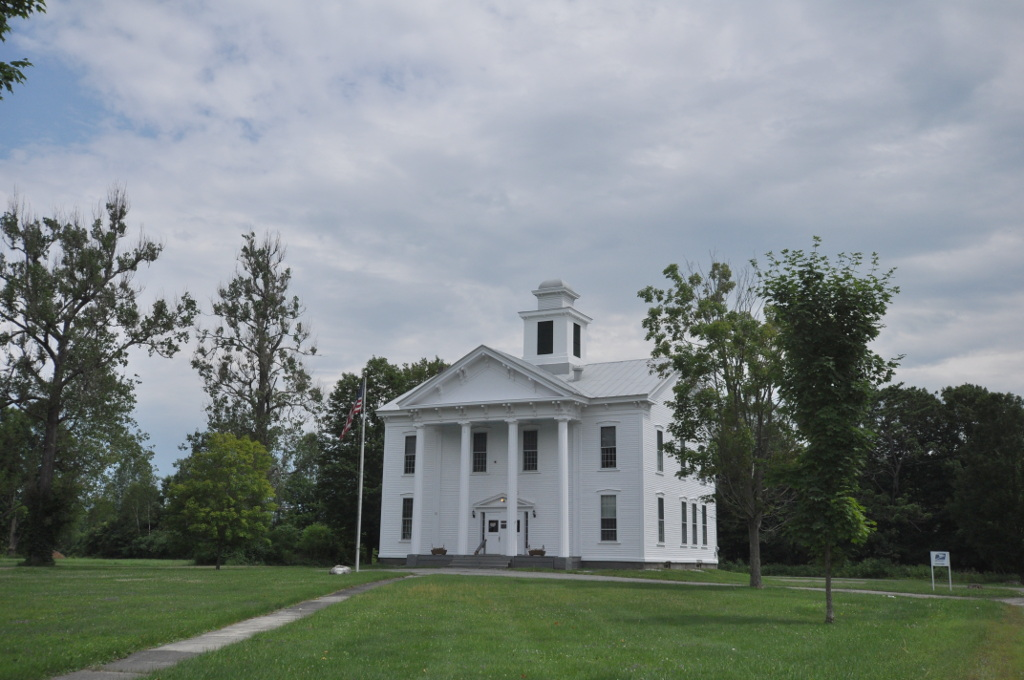

- Location within Vermont Location within the United States
- Location: Main St., McIndoe Falls, Vermont
- Coordinates: 44°15′51″N 72°3′52″W
- Area: 1 acre (0.40 ha)
- Built: 1853
- Built by: Martin, William C.
- Architectural style: Greek Revival
- NRHP reference No.: 75000137
- Added to NRHP: May 6, 1975

McIndoes Academy is a historic school building on Main Street (United States Route 5) in the McIndoe Falls village of Barnet, Vermont. Built in 1853, it is a prominent local example of Greek Revival architecture, serving as a local high school until 1969. It was listed on the National Register of Historic Places in 1975.

== Description and history ==
The former McIndoes Academy building stands in the Connecticut River village of McIndoe Falls, on the east side of US 5. It is set back from the road at the back of a broad green, and is accessed via Academy Lane, which loops around the green. It is a 2 1/2-story wood-frame structure, with a side-gable roof, clapboard siding, and a stone foundation. A square belfry topped by a cupola rises at the center of the roof, and a gabled four-column porch projects from the center of the front facade. The eaves of the main roof and projecting gable are adorned with paired brackets in the Italianate style. The main entrance is at the center of the front facade, flanked by sidelight windows and topped by a gabled pediment.

The academy was established in 1853, during a period in state history when a number of private academies were established. This one was created by a local citizens' group and funded by subscription, and in part by in-kind donations of supplies and labor. Its construction was overseen by William Martin, a local master carpenter. It served the community as its main secondary school until 1969, and has since served in a variety of public uses, including as a library and museum.

== See also ==
- National Register of Historic Places listings in Caledonia County, Vermont
