= Ethel K. Allen =

American biologist and bacteriologist

- Born: July 13, 1906; Milwaukee, Wisconsin, U.S.
- Died: May 7, 2006 (aged 99); Middleton, Wisconsin
- Education: University of Wisconsin–Madison (BA, MS)
- Scientific career
- Fields: Biology; Botany; Microbiology; Bacteriology
- Institutions: University of Wisconsin–Madison

Ethel K. Allen (July 13, 1906 – May 7, 2006) was an American naturalist and soil microbiologist. For most of her professional career, she worked at the University of Wisconsin–Madison. One of her most notable contributions was the publication of The Leguminosae, a Source Book of Characteristics, Uses and Nodulation with her husband and fellow bacteriologist, Oscar N. Allen. This book has been described as the "de facto encyclopedia" about legumes and nitrogen fixation.

== Early life and education ==
Allen was born in Milwaukee, Wisconsin. Her mother was second generation Dutch, and her father was second generation German. She had a sister who was legally blind and pursued a musical education. She also had a brother who pursued an education in chemistry.

Allen attended West Division High School in Milwaukee, where her interest in biology first began. She then went on to receive two degrees from the University of Wisconsin–Madison. She received a Bachelor of Arts degree in botany in 1928. The lack of jobs due to the Great Depression encouraged her to return to school, and she received a Master of Science degree in bacteriology in 1930.

== Career ==
After earning her master's degree, Ethel K. Allen moved with her husband and fellow bacteriologist, Oscar N. Allen, to Honolulu, where he had accepted a job at the University of Hawaii. Hawaii had a diversity of leguminous plants that they studied together in their lab. While she received no pay, Allen worked as an equal to her husband. In addition to working in the lab, Allen also worked in a blood bank (specifically during World War II) and taught at Punahou boarding school. Following the attack on Pearl Harbor, they moved to College Park, Maryland, and worked briefly at the University of Maryland.

In 1943, the Allens returned to the University of Wisconsin–Madison. With her husband, Allen published more than 35 papers as well as various articles, chapters, and the book, The Leguminosae, a Source Book of Characteristics, Uses and Nodulation, which was her most notable contribution to the field. The book includes observations of tens of thousands of species of legumes and is the result of many decades of studies done by the couple around the world. She continued working after her husband died in 1976.

For her achievements, Ethel Allen received an honorary doctorate from the University of Wisconsin–Madison in 1982.

== Personal ==
Allen distributed more than $16.5 million to the University of Wisconsin Foundation, which has been used for various projects around the campus. She died in Middleton, Wisconsin on May 7, 2006.
