= Wisconsin Agricultural Experiment Station =

Agricultural extension institution of the University of Wisconsin–Madison

The Wisconsin Agricultural Experiment Station is an agricultural extension institution of the University of Wisconsin–Madison. It is part of the university's College of Agricultural and Life Sciences, which predates the existence of the university itself by over a decade. The Experiment Station was created in 1883 with William Arnon Henry as its director and Henry P. Armsby as its associate director and chemist. The lands associated with it, near Fourth Lake (Lake Mendota), were purchased with $40,000 in bond debt authorized in 1866.

In 1908, the Experiment Station planted Wisconsin's first hemp, near Waupun, Wisconsin. The state went on to become one of the leading U.S. producers by World War I, with 7,000 tons harvested in 1917, around a third of the U.S. total.
