= College of Agricultural and Life Sciences (University of Wisconsin–Madison) =

Agricultural school of the University of Wisconsin-Madison

Coordinates: 43.07564°N 89.41028°W

The University of Wisconsin–Madison College of Agricultural and Life Sciences is one of the colleges of the University of Wisconsin–Madison. Founded in 1889, CALS fulfills UW–Madison's mission as a land grant university.

The college has more than 3,700 undergraduates working towards majors, and over 900 graduate students. CALS has a robust research enterprise, covering everything from fundamental aspects of biological sciences to the immediate problems and opportunities facing Wisconsin farms and businesses. It operates a system of agricultural research stations across the state.

== Undergraduate programs ==
The college offers more than 20 undergraduate majors, which are grouped into five areas of study:

- Health and Nutrition
- Food and Agriculture
- Biological Sciences
- Sustainability, Natural Resources and Environment
- Business, Communication and Society

== Academic departments ==
CALS has 15 academic departments that instruct students and carry out research in areas such as food systems; ecosystems; climate change; bioenergy and bioproducts; economic and community development; and health and wellness.

- Agricultural and Applied Economics
- Animal and Dairy Sciences
- Bacteriology
- Biochemistry
- Biological Systems Engineering
- Community and Environmental Sociology
- Entomology
- Food Science
- Forest and Wildlife Ecology
- Genetics
- Life Sciences Communication
- Nutritional Sciences
- Plant and Agroecosystem Sciences
- Plant Pathology
- Soil and Environmental Sciences

== History ==
In 1885 the university began offering a winter course for farmers, called the Agriculture Short Course. In 1889 the university put all of their agricultural offerings under a new College of Agriculture, with W.A. Henry as dean.

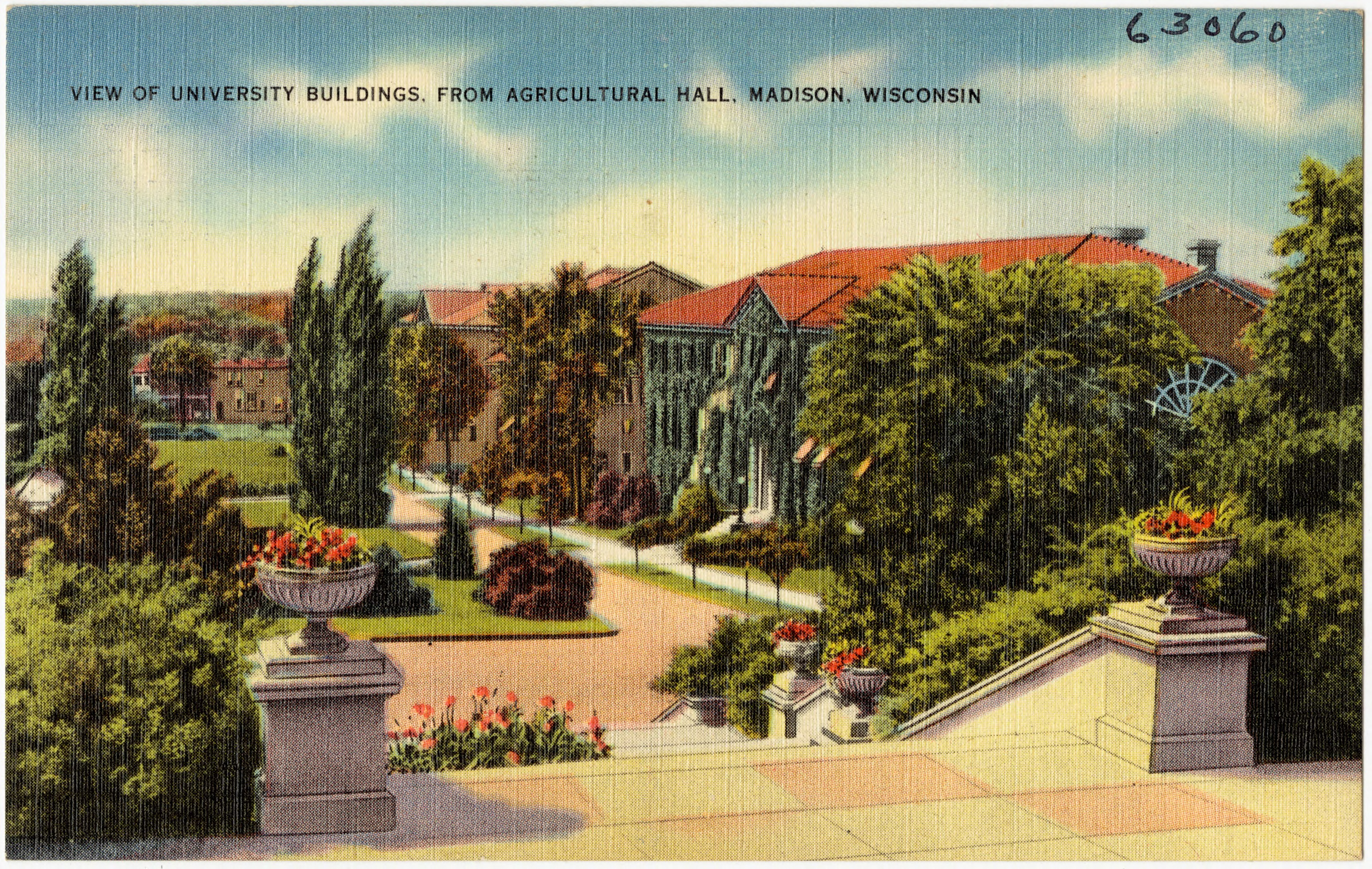
The view from Agricultural Hall

Agricultural Hall, known as "Ag Hall" for short, has been the home of the College of Agricultural and Life Sciences since 1903.

== Early Vitamin Research ==
UW biochemist Elmer McCollum and researcher Marguerite Davis isolated the very first vitamin in 1913. They called it “fat-soluble A,” and it was later renamed vitamin A.

In 1923, biochemistry professor Harry Steenbock devised a way to fortify foods with vitamin D through exposure to ultraviolet light. The innovation helped nearly eliminate rickets by the mid-1940s.

Biochemistry professor Conrad Elvehjem’s work on vitamin B-3 in the 1930s contributed to a cure for pellagra, a deadly, nutrition-related disease that reached epidemic proportions in the United States in the first half of the 20th century.

== Rural Art Program ==
The college has a unique legacy of celebrating the arts and humanities in agriculture. In 1936, CALS Dean Chris L. Christensen, along with rural sociologist John Rector Barton, established the Wisconsin Rural Art Program, which later became the Wisconsin Regional Art Program. The college hosts a WRAP exhibition each year.

The Rural Art Program included an Artist-in-Residence position. The first artist-in-residence was John Steuart Curry, an American Regionalist painter, who arrived at the university in the fall of 1936.

== See also ==
- Farm and Industry Short Course (FISC)
- Wisconsin Agricultural Experiment Station
