= McIndoe Falls, Vermont =

Unincorporated community in Barnet, Vermont, United States of America

Coordinates: 44°15′41″N 72°3′47″W

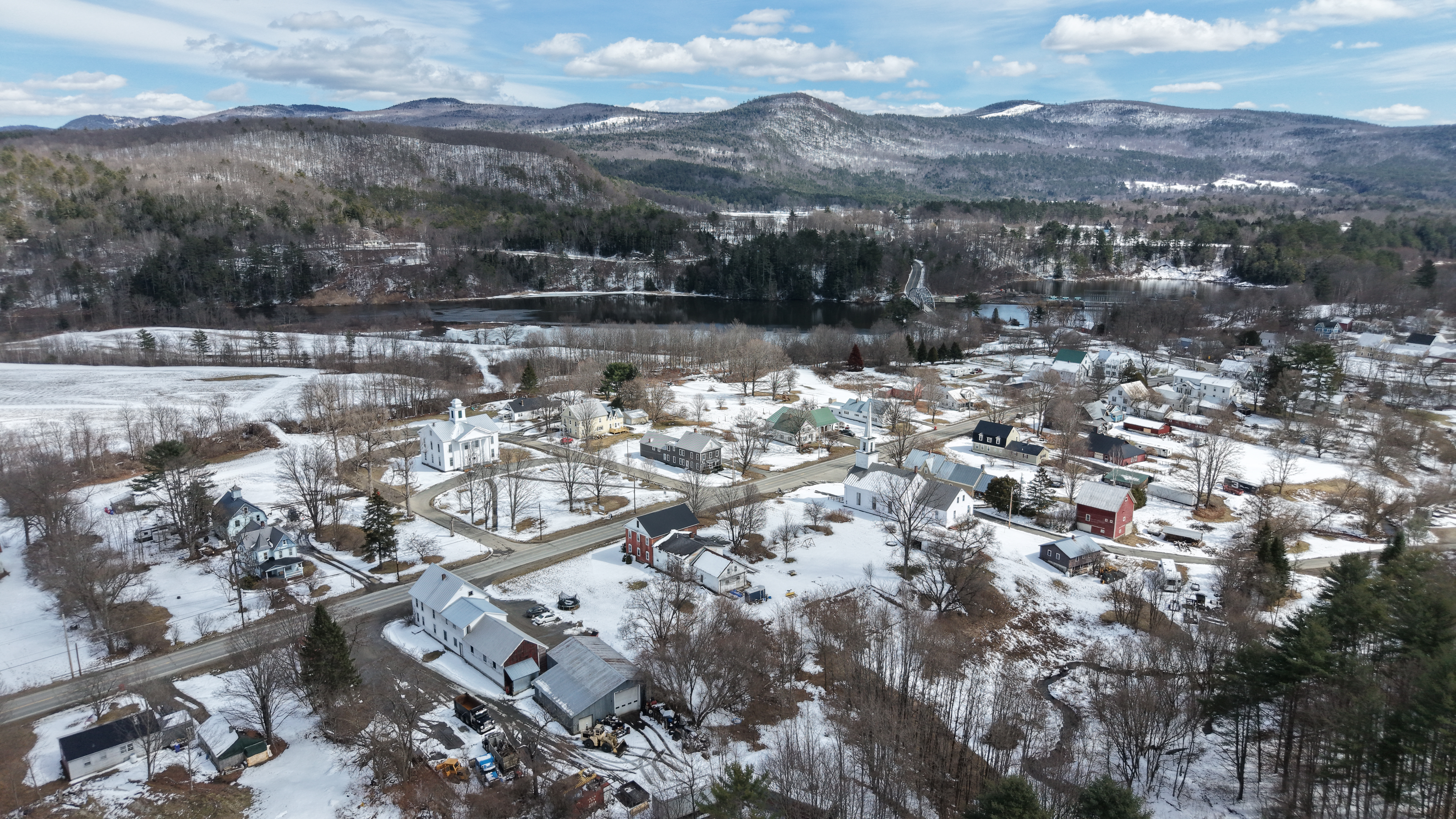
McIndoe Falls, VT, from the northwest

McIndoe Falls is an unincorporated community within the town of Barnet, Vermont, in the United States. It is located in the southeastern corner of Barnet, along the Connecticut River, the state boundary with New Hampshire. A dam on the Connecticut River at the village forms the McIndoes Reservoir, which extends upstream to the village of Barnet.

U.S. Route 5 passes north–south through the village. Interstate 91 bypasses the village to the west, with the nearest access being Exit 18 (Barnet), 3 miles (5 km) to the north. McIndoes Falls Road leads east from the center of the village across the Connecticut River to the town of Monroe, New Hampshire. The next river crossing upstream is 2 miles (3 km) to the north near Barnet village, and the next crossing downstream is 8 miles (13 km) south where U.S. Route 302 crosses between Wells River, Vermont, and Woodsville, New Hampshire.

McIndoe Falls has a separate ZIP code (05050) from the rest of Barnet.

McIndoe Falls was also referred to as McIndoes or McIndoes Falls. The historic McIndoes Academy building is in the village. An 1875 map shows McIndoes Falls. The post office established in 1885 was named McIndoes Falls.
