= Deaths in February 1981 =

The following is a list of notable deaths in February 1981.

Entries for each day are listed alphabetically by surname. A typical entry lists information in the following sequence:

- Name, age, country of citizenship at birth, subsequent country of citizenship (if applicable), reason for notability, cause of death (if known), and reference.

== February 1981 ==
=== 1 ===
- Aleksandra Beļcova, 88, Soviet Latvian painter.
- Joe Carroll, 61, American jazz singer, heart attack.
- Lourdes Casal, 42, Cuban poet and activist, diabetes.
- Edwin K. Cheadle, 85, American jurist.
- Gene Comstock, 70, American racing driver.
- Donald Wills Douglas Sr., 88, American aircraft designer and industrialist (Douglas Aircraft Company).
- James H. Doyle, 83, American naval admiral.
- Wanda Hendrix, 52, American actress (Prince of Foxes, Ride the Pink Horse), pneumonia.
- Roscoe Holcomb, 68, American singer and musician.
- Eric Hultén, 86, Swedish botanist and explorer.
- Hans Kalm, 91, Estonian soldier.
- Charles Luck, 94, British Olympic gymnast (1912).
- Fred Luehring, 99, American college sports coach.
- Mischa Mischakoff, 85, Russian-American violinist, heart failure.
- Ernst Pepping, 79, German composer.
- Steven Hayden Pollock, 33, American mycologist, shot.
- Roy H. Sengstock, 67, American politician, member of the Wisconsin State Assembly (1941–1942, 1947–1955).
- Geirr Tveitt, 72, Norwegian composer and pianist.
- Morris Weitz, 64, American philosopher.

=== 2 ===
- Hugh J. Addonizio, 67, American politician, mayor of Newark (1962–1970) and member of the U.S. House of Representatives (1949–1962), cardiac arrest.
- Anne X. Alpern, 77, Russian-born American jurist, Pennsylvania attorney general (1959–1961).
- Xenia Belmas, 91, Russian-South African opera singer, cancer.
- Jan Donner, 89, Dutch jurist and politician.
- Einar Larsen, 80, Danish footballer.
- Hans Leyers, 84, German general.
- Louise Lorraine, 76, American actress (The Adventures of Tarzan, The Radio King, Near the Rainbow's End).
- Hector B. McKinnon, 90, Canadian civil servant.
- Richard Muckermann, 89, German politician.
- Jack Parsons, 90, English cricketer and reverend.
- Al Van Camp, 77, American baseball player.

=== 3 ===
- J Harlen Bretz, 98, American geologist.
- Jerry Corcoran, 87, American football player and executive.
- Sammy Crooks, 73, English football player and manager.
- Charles Ferster, 58, American behavioral psychologist, heart attack.
- Isabel Garcés, 80, Spanish actress.
- J. W. Jones, 86, American football player and college basketball coach.
- Margaret McNamara, 65, American literacy advocate (Reading Is Fundamental), cancer.
- Normand Poirier, 53, American journalist.

=== 4 ===
- Percival Beale, 74, English civil servant, Chief Cashier of the Bank of England (1949–1955).
- Mario Camerini, 85, Italian filmmaker (Ulysses).
- Deng Chumin, 91, Chinese social scientist.
- Grant Gillis, 80, American baseball player, cancer.
- Kathy Godfrey, 66, American talk show host, heart attack.
- Cyril Goulden, 83, Canadian agriculturalist.
- Ghulam Ghaus Hazarvi, 84–85, Pakistani politician.
- Holger Henning, 75, Swedish naval admiral.
- Joan Ingram, 70, English tennis player.
- Joe Jacques, 36, English footballer, heart attack.
- Douglas McAlpine, 90, British neurologist.
- Adhaury Rocha, 60, Brazilian Olympic sports shooter (1956).
- Robert H. Roche, 89, American politician.
- Michele Busiri Vici, 86, Italian architect and urban planner.
- Sir John Whitworth-Jones, 84, British RAF commander.

=== 5 ===
- Nadija Bilokin, 86, Soviet Ukrainian painter.
- Kuda Bux, 75, Indian-American magician and firewalker.
- Paul Couderc, 81, French mathematician and astronomer.
- Hilda Dresen, 84, Estonian translator and telegraphist.
- Karl Feller, 66, American trade unionist.
- Ella Grasso, 61, American politician, governor of Connecticut (1975–1980) and member of the U.S. House of Representatives (1971–1975), heart attack.
- Benjamin Kaufman, 86, American soldier, Medal of Honor recipient.
- Sir William Scotter, 58, British general.
- Jake Stephens, 80, American baseball player.

=== 6 ===
- Gilbert Ashton, 84, English cricketer.
- Raymond Bossus, 77, French politician.
- Roualeyn Cumming, 89, English cricketer.
- Ludwig Damminger, 67, German footballer.
- Frederica of Hanover, 63, German-born Greek queen consort (1947–1964), heart failure.
- Suzanne Guité, 54, Canadian artist, murdered.
- Bernie Heselton, 78, American football coach.
- Cactus Keck, 82, American baseball player.
- Hugo Montenegro, 55, American composer, emphysema.
- Marthe Robin, 78, French mystic and charity worker.
- Giovanni Stradone, 69, Italian painter.
- A. H. Vedel, 86, Danish naval admiral.

=== 7 ===
- Du Junhui, 76, Chinese feminist activist.
- Clarence Eldridge, 92, American baseball umpire and advertising executive.
- Hermann Esser, 80, German politician, journalist and Nazi government propagandist (Völkischer Beobachter).
- Connie Kunzmann, 24, American basketball player, bludgeoned.
- Paul Mattick, 76, German-American political theorist.
- Marius Mondelé, 67, Belgian footballer.
- Joseph Plavcan, 72, American painter.
- Emil Spiridonov, 55, Soviet naval admiral, plane crash.

=== 8 ===
- Jakob Bender, 70, German footballer.
- María Cervantes, 95, Cuban musician and singer.
- Muhammad Usman Diplai, 72, Pakistani writer and journalist.
- Joe Dougherty, 79, American Olympic rower (1928, 1936).
- Hendrik Hagens, 80, Dutch Olympic fencer (1928).
- Marvin Johnson, 53, American football player.
- Józef Kiszkurno, 86, Polish Olympic sports shooter (1952).
- Brendan Nestor, 69, Irish footballer.
- Spud Owen, 75, American college sports coach.
- Mary Ryan, 83, Irish politician, TD (1944–1961).
- Iosif Șilimon, 62, Romanian aircraft designer.

=== 9 ===
- Jack Z. Anderson, 76, American politician, member of the U.S. House of Representatives (1939–1953), suicide by gunshot.
- Franz Andrysek, 75, Austrian Olympic weightlifter (1924, 1928).
- M. C. Chagla, 80, Indian jurist and politician, heart attack.
- Mercedes Gleitze, 80, British swimmer.
- Bill Haley, 55, American musician (Bill Haley & His Comets) and singer ("Rock Around the Clock"), heart attack.
- Aase Hansen, 87, Danish writer.
- Stephen Hughes, 61, English footballer.
- John Russell Love, 86, Canadian politician.
- Helen Schucman, 71, American psychologist, pancreatic cancer.
- Martha Priscilla Shaw, 76, American politician and educator.
- Tiny Thompson, 77, Canadian ice hockey player.
- Burr Williams, 72, American ice hockey player.
- Hisa Yoneyama, 84, Japanese politician and poet.

=== 10 ===
- John Bahadur, 63, Guyanese cricketer.
- J. D. Batton, 69, American police chief.
- Hans Helbæk, 73, Danish archaeologist.
- Paul C. Jones, 79, American politician, member of the U.S. House of Representatives (1948–1969).
- Mary McCormic, 91, American opera singer and professor.
- Nándor von Orbán, 71, Hungarian Olympic pentathlete (1936).
- Sir Hubert Shirley-Smith, 79, British civil engineer.

=== 11 ===
- Chan Choy Siong, 49, Singaporean politician, traffic collision.
- Sir Charles Daniel, 86, British naval admiral.
- Nicholas Falcone, 88, Italian-American clarinetist and conductor.
- Ketti Frings, 71, American playwright (Look Homeward, Angel) and screenwriter, cancer.
- Ichikawa Fusae, 87, Japanese politician and women's rights activist.
- Max Leichter, 60, German Olympic wrestler (1952).
- Maurice Mandrillon, 78, French Olympic skier (1924, 1928).
- Kermit Murdock, 72, American actor.
- Al Sarafiny, 74, American football player and coach.
- Franz Sondheimer, 54, German-born British chemist, suicide by cyanide poisoning.
- Haakon Olsen Wika, 81, Norwegian politician.

=== 12 ===
- Andreas Alföldi, 85, Hungarian historian and archaeologist.
- Lev Atamanov, 75, Soviet animator.
- Trygve de Lange, 62, Norwegian lawyer and businessman.
- Murray Deloford, 64, British tennis player.
- Lester A. Dessez, 84, American general, cardiovascular disease.
- Jean Dixon, 87, American actress.
- Art Frahm, 74, American painter.
- Sir Bruce Fraser, 1st Baron Fraser of North Cape, 93, British naval admiral.
- Frank Genovese, 66, American baseball player, manager and scout.
- Marjorie Wong Hee, 75, American painter.
- Shabir Ibrahim Kaskar, 25–26, Indian career criminal, shot.
- Leung Sing Poh, 71, Hong Kong actor and singer, intestinal cancer.
- Gerard J. Muccigrosso, 69, American lawyer and politician, member of the New York State Assembly (1938).
- Christen Møller, 96, Danish Olympic sports shooter (1920, 1936).
- Bill Sadler, 84, English cricketer.
- Vasily Sokolov, 69, Soviet footballer.
- Oliver Trinder, 73, British Olympic fencer (1936).

=== 13 ===
- Bainbridge Bunting, 67, American architectural historian.
- Jack Crapp, 68, English cricketer.
- Aniceto Fernández Alonso, 85, Spanish Roman Catholic priest.
- Wacław Kuchar, 83, Polish athlete, football player and manager.
- Hanna Mwais, 67–68, Israeli politician, MK (since 1977).
- Lambertus Nicodemus Palar, 80, Indonesian diplomat.
- Ella Simon, 78–79, Australian Aboriginal activist.
- René Taupin, 76, French-American translator and academic.
- Fred Tomley, 49, English footballer.
- Evert Verwey, 75, Dutch chemist.
- Merrik Ward, 72, English cricketer.
- Eric Whelpton, 86, British writer and traveler.

=== 14 ===
- John H. Boylan, 73, American politician, member of the Vermont House of Representatives (1951–1953) and Senate (1955–1965).
- Esteban Canal, 84, Peruvian-Italian chess player.
- Sir Angus Cunninghame Graham, 87, British naval admiral.
- Gerry Hartigan, 76, Australian footballer.
- Sacha Kolin, 69, French-American painter.
- Pepe Martínez, 27, Mexican footballer, traffic collision.
- Edward McEntee, 74, American judge.

=== 15 ===
- Pierre Blanchy, 83, French politician.
- Mike Bloomfield, 37, American blues musician, drug overdose.
- Edward T. Dicker, 67, American politician, member of the Texas House of Representatives (1951–1953).
- Dezső Ernster, 82, Hungarian opera singer, cancer.
- Mečislovas Gedvilas, 79, Lithuanian politician.
- Eugen Hasler, 69, Liechtensteiner politician.
- Joris in 't Veld, 85, Dutch politician.
- Isaac Don Levine, 89, Russian-born American journalist, heart attack.
- Hubert Pagden, 83, South African cricketer.
- Cotton Pippen, 69, American baseball player.
- Clemente Primieri, 86, Italian general.
- Karl Richter, 54, German conductor, heart attack.

=== 16 ===
- Luigi Bosatra, 75, Italian Olympic racewalker (1924).
- May Campbell, 65, Australian field hockey player.
- A. Doris Banks Henries, 68, American-Liberian educator and writer, cancer.
- John Hudson, 76, Australian Anglican prelate.
- Mel Maceau, 59, American football player.
- Miye Matsukata, 59, Japanese-born American jewelry designer, meningitis.
- Khan Mohammad Moinuddin, 50, Bangladeshi writer.
- William Pidgeon, 72, Australian cartoonist and illustrator.
- Genevieve Clark Thomson, 86, American suffragist.
- Charles E. Waring, 72, American chemist.
- Herman Wirth, 95, Dutch-German historian.

=== 17 ===
- Marcel Bezençon, 73, Swiss media executive and journalist, creator of Eurovision.
- Janina Broniewska, 76, Polish writer and communist activist.
- Carlos Casaravilla, 80, Uruguayan actor (El Lazarillo de Tormes).
- Norris Embry, 60, American painter, stroke.
- Roberto Etxebarria, 72, Spanish footballer.
- Al Fitch, 68, American Olympic runner (1936).
- Mick Gardner, 82, Australian politician.
- David Garnett, 88, English writer and novelist (Aspects of Love, Lady into Fox, The Sailor's Return).
- Ellen Gottschalch, 86, Danish actress.
- Carl Kruse-Jensen, 91, Norwegian jurist.
- Arthur O'Sullivan, 69, Irish actor.
- Dante Secchi, 70, Italian Olympic rower (1936).
- Sam Warhurst, 73, English footballer.
- Alberto Zozaya, 72, Argentine footballer.

=== 18 ===
- Eddie Billimoria, 80–81, Indian actor.
- Arne Bryngelsson, 66, Swedish footballer.
- Peter Cavanagh, 66, English impressionist.
- Mario Gachet, 101, Italian painter.
- Ibrahim Abdel Hady Pasha, 85, Egyptian politician, prime minister (1948–1949).
- George Hammond, 77, American racing driver.
- Andy High, 83, American baseball player.
- Georges Henri Kaestlin, 88–89, Russian-English banker and philatelist.
- Wally Laidlaw, 89, Australian footballer.
- Antonio Modesto Quirasco, 76, Mexican politician, governor of Veracruz (1956–1962).
- Gösta "Snoddas" Nordgren, 54, Swedish singer ("Flottarkärlek") and entertainer.
- Jack Northrop, 85, American aircraft industrialist (Northrop Corporation).
- Frederick Nymeyer, 83, American economist and industrialist.
- Del Ritchhart, 70, American football player.
- Joe Thomas, 78, American jazz musician.
- Karl Wahl, 88, German politician.

=== 19 ===
- Sam Barnes, 81, American baseball player.
- Sven Hugo Borg, 84, Swedish-American actor.
- Islwyn Davies, 72, British Anglican priest.
- Sir Bernard Evans, 75, Australian architect and politician.
- Olive Gilbert, 82, British singer ("We'll Gather Lilacs") and actress.
- Ryurik Ivnev, 89, Soviet Russian poet and novelist.
- William W. Knight, 72, American newspaper publisher.
- Dorothy McCullough Lee, 79, American politician, mayor of Portland, Oregon (1949–1953).
- Douglas Lewis, 82, Canadian boxer.
- Nino Marchetti, 75, Italian actor.
- Warren McGuirk, 75, American football player and coach.
- Leonard Plugge, 91, British politician and radio entrepreneur, MP (1935–1945).
- Zeferino Vaz, 72, Brazilian academic and physician, heart disease.
- Lloyd White, 62, New Zealand diplomat.
- Harry Winkler, 65, American screenwriter (The Addams Family, The Doris Day Show, The Brady Bunch).

=== 20 ===
- Jaap Bakema, 66, Dutch architect.
- Bernard B. Brown, 82, American composer and sound engineer.
- Katherine A. Foley, 91, Irish-born American politician, member of the Massachusetts House of Representatives (1935–1938).
- Frederic Fox, 63, American historian and presidential aide.
- Nicolas de Gunzburg, 76, French-American magazine editor and socialite, stroke.
- Marcus Pereira, 50, Brazilian lawyer and record producer, suicide.
- Germaine Poinso-Chapuis, 79, French politician.
- Lynn Probert, 68, Welsh lawn bowler.
- Brian Sellers, 73, English cricketer.
- Ioannis Theodorakopoulos, 80, Greek philosopher.
- Athanasios Toutoungi, 81, Syrian Melkite Greek Catholic prelate.

=== 21 ===
- Ahmad bin Rashid Al Mualla, 78–79, Emirati royal.
- Gaylord G. Cummings, 86, American politician, member of the New Hampshire House of Representatives (1974–1976).
- Claiborne Foster, 84, American actress.
- Ron Grainer, 58, Australian composer (Doctor Who theme music), spinal tumor.
- Amory Houghton, 81, American diplomat and businessman.
- Kevin C. McCann, 76, American biographer and academic administrator, complications from surgery.
- John F. McCarthy, 57, American politician, member of the California State Senate (1950–1971).
- Julla Sæthern, 79, Norwegian barrister and politician.

=== 22 ===
- Curtis Bernhardt, 81, German-American film director.
- Helen Burbank, 82, American public servant.
- Guy Butler, 81, British Olympic sprinter (1920).
- Imrich Karvaš, 77, Slovak economist.
- Pierre Korb, 72, French footballer.
- Kenan Kutub-zade, 74, Soviet photographer and photojournalist.
- Michael Maltese, 73, American screenwriter and storyboard artist (Looney Tunes, Merrie Melodies), co-creator of Pepé Le Pew, cancer.
- Saul K. Padover, 75, Austrian-born American historian and political scientist, stroke.
- Walter Simon, 87, German-English sinologist.
- Joe Smith, 97, American vaudeville comedian (Smith and Dale).
- Ilo Wallace, 91, American socialite, second lady of the United States (1941–1945).

=== 23 ===
- Myrl Brown, 86, American baseball player.
- Albert Dejonghe, 87, Belgian racing cyclist.
- Chester Stairs Duffus, 89, Canadian-British flying ace.
- Shep Fields, 70, American bandleader, heart attack.
- Robert L. Fish, 68, American novelist, heart attack.
- Bruce Rhodes, 28, American football player, shot.
- John Solomon, 77, New Zealand Olympic rower (1932).

=== 24 ===
- John Moors Cabot, 79, American diplomat, stroke.
- Louis J. Camuti, 87, Italian-born American veterinarian, heart attack.
- Zoltán Glass, 77, Hungarian photographer.
- Ty Hunter, 40, American singer, lung cancer.
- Jerry Landauer, 49, German-born American journalist, heart attack.
- Georgi Nadjakov, 84, Bulgarian physicist.
- Moshe Nathanson, 81, Ottoman-born American composer.
- Annette Pearse, 87, New Zealand art gallery curator.

=== 25 ===
- Maria Åkerblom, 82, Finnish evangelical leader.
- Imtiaz Ali 'Arshi', 75, Indian scholar.
- William Claypoole, 73, American politician, member of the Pennsylvania House of Representatives (1967–1970).
- Tomás de la Noval, 67, Cuban-American baseball player.
- Alf Goddard, 83, English actor.
- Richard Honig, 91, German penologist.
- Ella Hill Hutch, 57, American politician, member of the San Francisco Board of Supervisors (since 1978).
- Ann Lowe, 82, American fashion designer.
- Matty Malneck, 77, American jazz musician.
- Laurel McAlister, 88, New Zealand community activist.
- Frank McCrea, 84, American baseball player.
- Gunichi Mikawa, 92, Japanese naval admiral.
- Zalman Susayeff, 70, Israeli politician, MK (1951–1959).
- Mary Sykes, 84, British politician and lawyer.

=== 26 ===
- Robert Aickman, 66, English conservationist and writer, cancer.
- Josef Caska, 67, Czech tennis player.
- Gerald Cross, 69, English actor.
- Ismael Díaz, 33, Salvadoran footballer, murdered.
- Ulf Grönholm, 38, Finnish racing driver, traffic collision.
- Howard Hanson, 84, American composer ("Symphony No. 4").
- Charles M. Justice, 72, American college football player and coach.
- Don Koehler, 55, American salesman, world's tallest living man (since 1969), heart ailment.
- Jean-Pierre Lehman, 66, French paleontologist.
- Bud Lindberg, 71, American basketball player.
- Alexander Lozovsky, 73, Soviet general.
- Justin McCarthy, 86, Australian footballer.
- Sir William Oliver, 79, British general.
- Henry Richardson, 63, American politician, member of the New Hampshire House of Representatives (1975–1979)
- Jennie Smillie Robertson, 103, Canadian surgeon.
- Walter Rohland, 82, German industrialist.
- Tatjana Sais, 71, German actress.
- Tee Yai, 29, Thai bandit, shot.
- F.C. Terborgh, 79, Dutch writer.
- Roger Tonge, 35, British actor (Crossroads), heart failure.
- Ferenc Tóth, 72, Hungarian Olympic wrestler (1948).

=== 27 ===
- Børge Bæth, 61, Danish Olympic swimmer (1936).
- Charles-Philbert de Couët de Lorry, 69, French Olympic equestrian (1952).
- Pierre Deley, 87, French aviator.
- Joaquín Domingo, 63, Spanish billiards player.
- Jacob H. Gilbert, 60, American politician, member of the U.S. House of Representatives (1960–1971).
- Francis Irby Gwaltney, 59, American author.
- Ike Isaacs, 57, American jazz bassist.
- J. C. Johnson, 84, American pianist and songwriter.
- Paul F. Kerr, 84, American minerologist, heart attack.
- Sebastian Russo, 56, Italian-American physician, shot.
- Nan Shepherd, 88, Scottish writer and poet.
- Marion Tylee, 80, New Zealand artist.

=== 28 ===
- Gasret Aliev, 58, Soviet soldier.
- Edna Beilenson, 71, American typographer and publisher.
- André Devaux, 86, French Olympic sprinter (1920).
- Virginia Huston, 55, American actress, cancer.
- Albin Lesky, 84, Austrian classical philologist.
- Nicolae Penescu, 84, Romanian politician and dissident, injuries sustained in an explosion.
- Carel Polak, 71, Dutch politician.
- William Renwick, 65, American politician, member of the Pennsylvania House of Representatives (1955–1978).
- Talbot Rothwell, 64, English screenwriter (Carry On).
- Anatoly Shirshov, 59, Soviet mathematician.
- Rodolphe Spillmann, 85, Swiss Olympic fencer (1948).
- Robert L. Wolfe, 52, American film editor (All the President's Men, On Golden Pond, The Rose).
