= Joseph Smith (disambiguation) =

Joseph Smith (1805–1844) was an American religious leader and the founder of the Latter Day Saint movement, which gave rise to Mormonism.

Joseph or Joe Smith may also refer to:

== Arts and entertainment ==
- Joseph Smith (art collector) (1682–1770), British art collector and consul at Venice
- Joseph Lindon Smith (1863–1950), American painter
- Joe Smith (comedian) (1884–1981), American comedian
- Joseph C. Smith (1883–1965), American violinist, composer and band leader
- Joseph Smith (dancer) (1875–1932), American dancer
- Joe Smith (musician) (1902–1937), American jazz trumpeter
- Joe Smith (music industry executive) (1928–2019), American music industry executive
- Sonny Knight or Joseph C. Smith (1934–1998), American R&B singer and author
- Joseph A. Smith (artist) (born 1936), American artist and professor at the Pratt Institute
- Pepe Smith or Joseph William Feliciano Smith (1947–2019), Filipino musician
- Joseph Smith (pianist) (1948–2015), American pianist, author, and lecturer
- Joe Smith, American, a 1942 American spy film

== Military ==
- Joseph Smith (East India Company officer) (1732/3–1790), British East India Company Army Brigadier General
- Joseph Smith (admiral) (1790–1877), American admiral during the American Civil War
- Joseph B. Smith (1826–1861), U.S. Navy officer
- Joseph Sewall Smith (1836–1919), Union Army soldier and Medal of Honor recipient

== Politics ==
- Joseph Smith (Michigan politician) (1809–1880), American businessman and politician in the Michigan House of Representatives
- Joseph Crowther Smith (1818–1886), mayor of Wolverhampton, 1865–66
- Joseph Showalter Smith (1824–1884), U.S. Representative from Oregon
- Joe L. Smith (1880–1962), American Democratic Party politician from West Virginia
- J. Joseph Smith (1904–1980), U.S. Representative from Connecticut
- Joseph Smith (Australian politician) (1904–1993), member of the Victorian Parliament
- Joe F. Smith (1918–2013), American Democratic Party politician from West Virginia
- Joseph A. Smith (sheriff) (1911–2003), American politician; Sheriff of Worcester County, Massachusetts, 1962–1977
- Joseph F. Smith (Pennsylvania politician) (1920–1999), US Representative from Pennsylvania
- Joe Smith (Oregon politician) (1935–2025), member of the Oregon House of Repreentatives
- Joseph Henry Smith (1945-2023), Minister for Defence of Ghana
- Joe Smith (Missouri politician) (born c. 1973), Republican member of the Missouri House of Representatives

== Religion ==
- Joseph Smith (academic) (1670–1756), English churchman and Provost of the Queen's College, Oxford
- Joseph Smith (Presbyterian minister, born 1736) (1736–1792), Presbyterian minister and founder of Washington & Jefferson College
- Joseph Smith Sr. (1771–1840), father of Joseph Smith, and first Presiding Patriarch in the Latter Day Saint movement
- Joseph Smith (Presbyterian minister, born 1796) (1796–?), Presbyterian minister, author, and academic
- Joseph Smith III (1832–1914), Prophet-President of the Reorganized Church of Jesus Christ of Latter Day Saints
- Joseph F. Smith (1838–1918), nephew of Joseph Smith; sixth president of The Church of Jesus Christ of Latter-day Saints
- Joseph Fielding Smith (1876–1972), son of Joseph F. Smith and tenth president of The Church of Jesus Christ of Latter-day Saints
- Joseph Fielding Smith (patriarch) (1899–1964), Patriarch to the Church of The Church of Jesus Christ of Latter-day Saints from 1942 to 1946

== Sports ==
=== Association football ===
- Joe Smith (footballer, born 1886) (1886–?), English footballer for Hull City, Everton and Bury
- Joseph Smith (footballer, born 1888) (1888–1928), English footballer with Sheffield United and Derby County
- Joe Smith (football forward, born 1889) (1889–1971), England international footballer with Bolton Wanderers and manager of Blackpool
- Joe Smith (football halfback, born 1889) (1889–1916), English footballer with Birmingham and Chesterfield, killed in action during the First World War
- Joe Smith (footballer, born 1890) (1890–1956), England international footballer with West Bromwich Albion
- Joe Smith (footballer, born 1908) (1908–1993), English footballer with Watford
- Joe Smith (winger), English professional footballer with Burnley
- Joe Smith (footballer, born 1953), Scottish footballer with Aberdeen

=== Baseball ===
- Joe Smith (1910s pitcher), American baseball player
- Joe Smith (catcher) (1893–1974), American baseball catcher
- Joe Smith (2010s pitcher) (born 1984), American baseball player

=== Gridiron football ===
- Joe Smith (American football coach) (1873–1923), American football player and coach
- Joe Smith (American football, born 1922) (1922–1978), American end for the Baltimore Colts of the All-America Football Conference
- Joe Bob Smith, (1934–2011) American-born Canadian football player
- Joseph Smith (American football) (fl. 1989–present), American college football player and coach, head football coach at Linfield College
- Joey Smith (American football) (1969–2024), American football player
- Joe Smith (running back) (born 1979), American professional gridiron football player

=== Other sports ===
- Joe Smith (athlete) (1917–1993), American marathon runner
- Joseph Smith (bobsleigh) (1925–1983), American bobsledder
- Joseph Smith (cricketer) (born 1946), Jamaican-born former English cricketer
- Joe Smith (basketball) (born 1975), American basketball player
- Joe Troy Smith (born 1977), American basketball player
- J. R. Smith (born 1985), American basketball player
- Joe Smith Jr. (born 1989), American boxer
- Joe Smith (rugby union) (born 1991), South African rugby union player and powerlifter

== Other people ==
- Joseph Smith (clockmaker) (born 1688), English clockmaker
- Joseph Smith (explorer) (died 1764), British fur trader and explorer
- Joseph Lee Smith (1776–1846), American lawyer, soldier, and jurist
- Joe Frazer Smith (1897–1957), American architect and author
- Joseph Victor Smith (1928–2007), British crystallographer and mineralogist
- Joseph Colin Smith (1931–2016), British urologist
- Joseph Smith (aircraft designer) (1897–1956), English aircraft designer who took over from R.J. Mitchell as Chief Designer for Supermarine
- Joe Saumarez Smith (1971–2025), British entrepreneur, journalist and gambling expert
- Joseph A. Smith Jr. (fl. 1974–present), professor of urology, editor-in-chief of Journal of Urology

== See also ==
- Joseph Smit, Dutch zoological illustrator
- Smith Joseph, American politician
- Joel Smith (disambiguation)
- Smith (surname)
- Smith family (Latter Day Saints)
