= Sixteen Waltzes, Op. 39 (Brahms) =

1865 set of piano pieces by Johannes Brahms

Sixteen Waltzes
- Piano music by Johannes Brahms
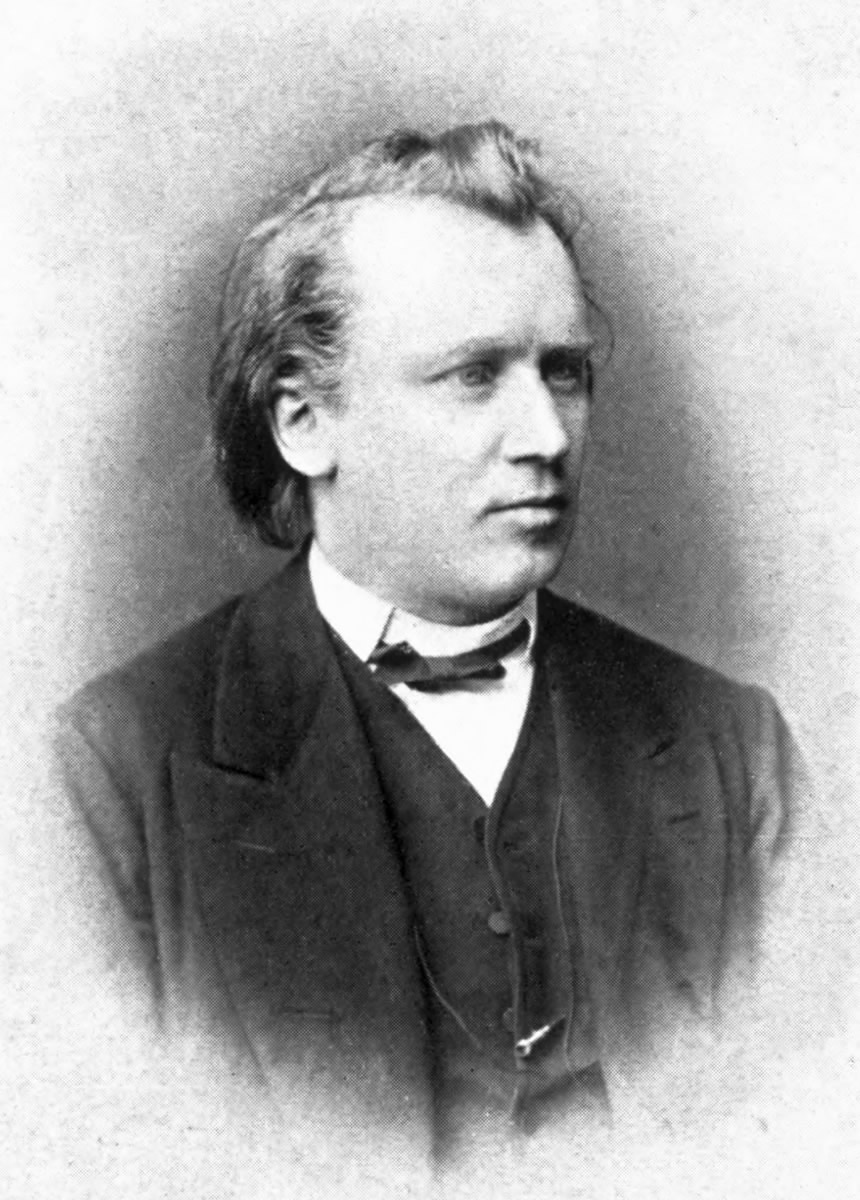
- The composer c. 1872
- Native name: Sechzehn Walzer
- Opus: 39
- Composed: 1865
- Dedication: Eduard Hanslick
- Published: 1866
- Scoring: piano four-hands; piano

Sixteen Waltzes (German: Sechzehn Walzer), Op. 39, is a set of 16 short waltzes for piano written by Johannes Brahms. They were composed in 1865, and published in 1866, dedicated to the music critic Eduard Hanslick.

== Background ==
These waltzes were written for piano four hands, and were also arranged for solo piano by the composer in two different versions – difficult and simplified. The three versions were published at the same time—and sold well, contrary to the composer's expectations.

Brahms wrote the waltzes while he lived in Vienna where he permanently settled in 1872. They were intended as a tribute to the waltz dance form which had become especially fashionable in his adopted city.

== Characteristics ==
In the solo versions, some of the keys were altered from the original duet version (the last four in the difficult version and no. 6 in the easy version). Waltz number 15 in A major (or A♭ in another version) has acquired a life of its own, as likely the most popular piece in the collection. An arrangement of five of the waltzes (nos. 1, 2, 11, 14, and 15) for two pianos, four hands was published after the composer's death.

Almost all of the waltzes are in a recapitulating binary form. For each waltz, the first half moves to the dominant, the relative major, or a substitute key. Then, the second half begins with a developmental passage that leads back to the main theme and the tonic.

In 1984, critic Edward Rothstein said that Joseph Smith "made a compelling case for taking them seriously as a unified cycle".

== Waltzes ==
The 16 waltzes listed here are played by Martha Goldstein:

No. 1 in B major Tempo giusto (1:02)
No. 2 in E major (1:32)
No. 3 in G♯ minor (1:02)
No. 4 in E minor Poco sostenuto (1:35)
No. 5 in E major Grazioso (1:10)
No. 6 in C♯ major Vivace (C major in the easy solo version) (1:07)
No. 7 in C♯ minor Poco più Andante (2:12)
No. 8 in B♭ major (1:40)
No. 9 in D minor (1:26)
No. 10 in G major (0:32)
No. 11 in B minor (1:28)
No. 12 in E major (1:20)
No. 13 in C major (B major in the more difficult solo version) (0:48)
No. 14 in A minor (G♯ minor in the more difficult solo version and the two-piano version) (1:34)
No. 15 in A major (A♭ major in the more difficult solo version and the two-piano version) (1:28)
No. 16 in D minor (C♯ minor in the more difficult solo version) (1:01)
