= Joel Smith (disambiguation) =

Joel Smith (born 1977) is a former Australian rules footballer for Hawthorn and St Kilda.

Joel Smith may also refer to:

- Joel Smith (footballer, born 1996), Australian rules footballer for Melbourne
- Joel Smith (murderer) (born 1973), English drug dealer and convicted murderer
- Joel B. Smith, American climatologist and expert on climate change policy
- Joel Smith, an actor working with the Screen Directors Playhouse
- Joel Smith, a curler competing in 2013 Molson Coors Tankard
- Joel Smith, an actor in 1965 American film Mutiny in Outer Space

== Other uses ==
- Joel Smith House, a historic house in rural Union County, Arkansas

== See also ==
- Joe Smith (disambiguation)
