= Nadija Bilokin =

- Надія Аврамівна Білокінь
- Born: December 14, 1894; Petrykivka, Dnipropetrovsk Oblast, Russian Empire
- Died: February 5, 1981 (aged 86); Radisne, Petrykivka Raion, Dnipropetrovsk Oblast, Ukraine
- Known for: Petrykivka painting, Folk art
- Movement: Ukrainian folk art
- Awards: Master of Folk Art of the Ukrainian SSR, Diploma of the First Degree

Nadija Avramivna Bilokin (December 14, 1894 – February 5, 1981) was a Ukrainian folk artist known for her contributions to Petrykivka painting, a traditional Ukrainian decorative art form.

== Biography ==
Nadija Bilokin was born on December 14, 1894, in Petrykivka, Dnipropetrovsk Oblast, Russian Empire, into a poor, large peasant family. She received no formal education. She began painting at the age of 12 and, by 14, was earning a living through her art, selling her drawings at the market and painting traditional Ukrainian homes on commission.

In 1920, she met a local drawing teacher, Oleksandr Statyva, who provided her with paints and paper and commissioned her drawings. In 1929, she joined a collective farm, which left her little time for creative work. In 1935, she was sent to Kyiv with other artisans to prepare for an exhibition of folk art. During her time in the capital, she created hundreds of floral designs and numerous genre compositions, which were displayed at the First Republican Exhibition of Folk Art in Kyiv and later at the Decade of Ukrainian Art in Moscow in 1936. Her works were highly successful, earning her the title of Master of Folk Art of the Ukrainian SSR, a diploma of the first degree, and a certificate of recognition. From 1938, she participated in international exhibitions.

After the German-Soviet War, Bilokin moved to the village of Radisne, Petrykivka Raion, Dnipropetrovsk Oblast, where she died on February 5, 1981.

== Artistic work ==
Bilokin created traditional Petrykivka painting compositions, featuring ornamental plant motifs such as "tsybulky" (onion-like shapes) and "kucheriavky" (curly patterns). Her works include:

- "Girl in the Garden" (1929)
- "Well in the Garden" (1929)
- "Betrothed Girl" (1931)
- "Ducks Swimming" (1931)
- "Village Street" (1931)
- "Two Young Women" (1935)
- Panel "Wedding" (1936)
- "Ukrainian Girls" (1936)
- "Flowers" (1936)
- "Roman and Oksana" (1961)
- "Satellite" (1961)
- "Red Star" (1963)
- "Panel with the Firebird" (1963)
- "Wedding Train" (1979)

In 1961, for the centennial exhibition commemorating the death of Taras Shevchenko, Bilokin created two panels and a traditional Ukrainian embroidered towel depicting the poet. In 1968, she produced decorative rushnyky on cigarette paper.

Her works are held in collections at the National Museum of Ukrainian Folk Decorative Art, the Dnipro Art Museum, the Odesa Art Museum, and other institutions.
