= Castle Crest =

Historic house in Mississippi, United States

- U.S. National Register of Historic Places
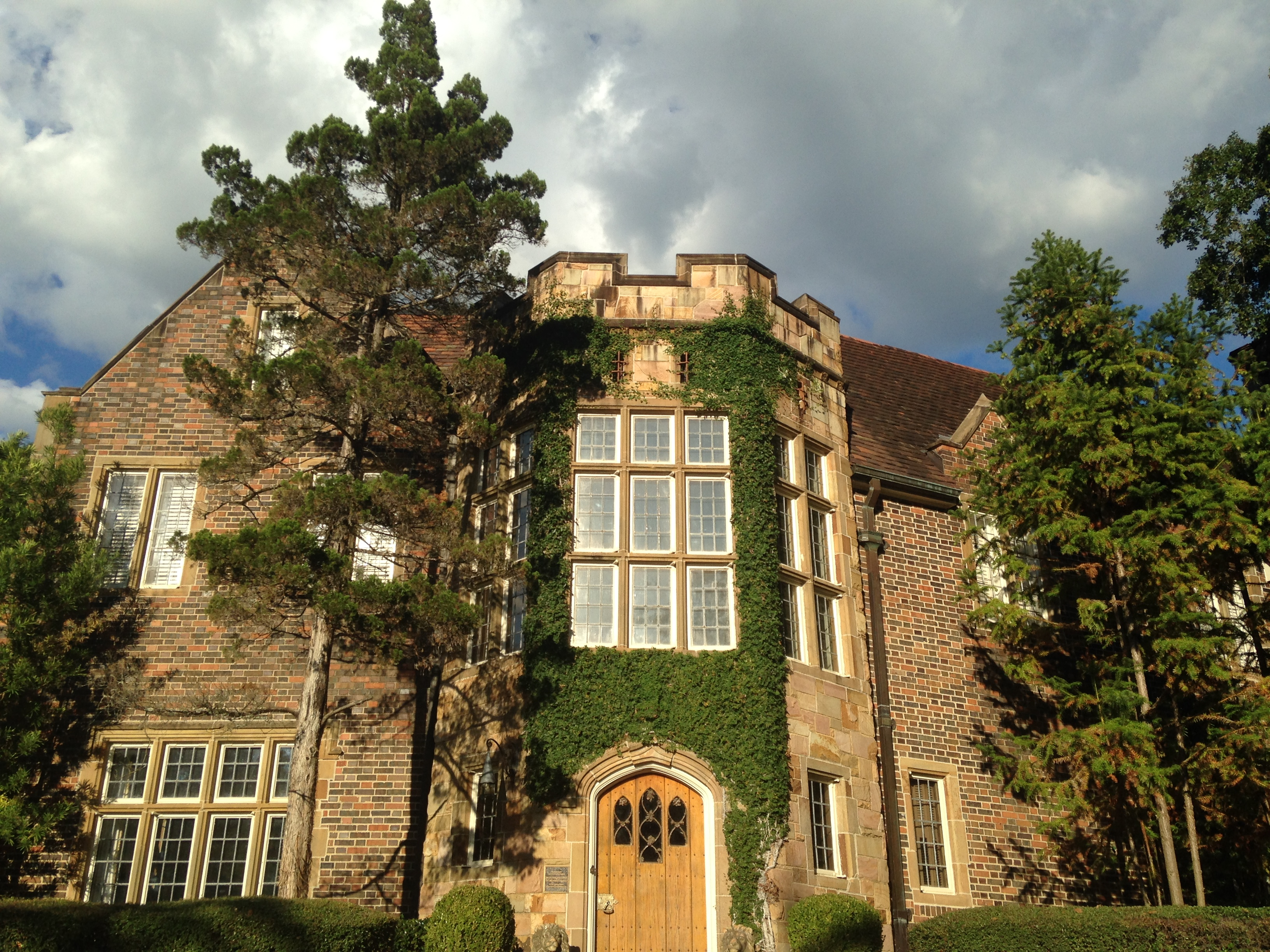
- Castle Crest in 2016

- Location within Mississippi Location within the United States
- Location: 114 Woodland Circle, Jackson, Mississippi
- Area: 2.5 acres (1.0 ha)
- Built: 1930
- Architect: J. Frazer Smith
- Architectural style: Tudor Revival
- NRHP reference No.: 10000131
- Added to NRHP: March 22, 2010

Castle Crest, also known as the Merrill-Sanders-Holman House, is a historic mansion in Jackson, Mississippi, U.S.. It was built for businessman I.W. Merrill in 1929–1930. By 1980, it belonged to Henry Holman and his wife Sondra. The house was designed in the Tudor Revival style by architect Joe Frazer Smith. It has been listed on the National Register of Historic Places since March 22, 2010.
