= Roualeyn Cumming =

English cricketer and colonial police officer

Personal information
- Full name: Roualeyn Charles Rossiter Cumming
- Born: 2 November 1891; Calne, Wiltshire, England
- Died: 6 February 1981 (aged 89); Droxford, Hampshire, England
- Batting: Unknown

Domestic team information
- Years: Team
- 1921/22: Europeans

Career statistics
Competition	First-class
Matches	1
Runs scored	6
Batting average	3.00
100s/50s	–/–
Top score	5
Catches/stumpings	2/–
- Source: Cricinfo, 8 November 2021

Roualeyn Charles Rossiter Cumming CIE (2 November 1891 – 6 February 1981) was an English first-class cricketer and colonial police officer.

The son of R. C. Cumming, he was born at Calne, Wiltshire, in November 1891. Cumming was educated at St Paul's School, London. He joined the Colonial Police Service in British India in 1911 as an assistant superintendent. Cumming played first-class cricket in India for the Europeans against the Indians at Madras in the 1922 Madras Presidency Match. Batting twice in the match, he was dismissed in the Europeans' first innings for a single run by M. Venkataramanjulu, while in their second innings he was dismissed for 5 runs by T. Vasu Nayudu.

In the colonial police he was promoted to superintendent in April 1922, and appointed a deputy inspector-general of police in August 1935. In 1937, he was appointed inspector-general of police and joint secretary in the Home Department of Assam Province. Cumming was made a Companion to the Order of the Indian Empire in the 1942 Birthday Honours and was decorated with the King's Police and Fire Service Medal during the Second World War. Cumming died in England in February 1981 at Droxford, Hampshire.
