= Hendrik Hagens =

Dutch fencer (1900–1981)

Personal information
- Born: 10 June 1900 Utrecht, Netherlands
- Died: 8 February 1981 (aged 80) Zeist, Netherlands

Sport
- Sport: Fencing

Hendrik Hagens (10 June 1900 – 8 February 1981) was a Dutch fencer. He competed in the team sabre event at the 1928 Summer Olympics.
