= María Cervantes =

Cuban pianist, singer, and composer

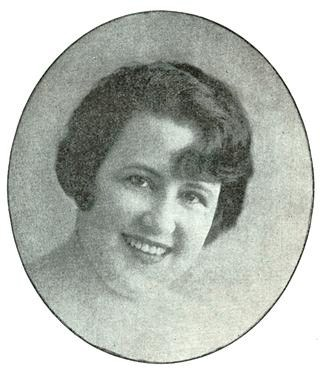
María Cervantes

María Cervantes (30 November 1885 – 8 February 1981) was a Cuban pianist, singer, and composer.

== Biography ==
María Cervantes was born on 30 November 1885 in Havana. She learned music from her father Ignacio Cervantes Kawanag (1847–1905), who was a well-known musician and "one of the first to use native Cuban music in his compositions". She also studied music from Gonzalo Nunez and Enriqueta Garcia.

She made records in the United States. She interpreted her father’s danzas, which was composed for her but “he was never able to find the logic to finish it.”

She was active as a musician until her death on 8 February 1981 in Havana.
