= Walter Rohland =

German industrial leader

Walter Rohland (14 December 1898 – 26 February 1981) was a German industrial leader during World War II. In 1916, during World War I, Rohland joined the engineering corps as a teenage volunteer. Rohland worked was chief engineer for the company Bochumer Verein headed by Walter Borbet (1881–1942). Borbet's company had pioneered the introduction of low-cost gun steels in World War I. In the 1920s Bochumer Verein became one of the centers for the development of centrifugal casting, a revolutionary process in which gun barrels, rather than being bored out of solid steel ingots, were spun out of molten metal. From 1940 to 1943, Rohland was chief of the Deutsche Edelstahlwerke Krefeld, a leading supplier of armour plating. From 1943 to 1945, Rohland was head of the giant Vereinigte Stahlwerke complex. He also served on the main German tank production coordinating committee.

Rohland was a Nazi Party member from 1933.

On 20 April 1944, Rohland appealed to Albert Speer not to resign, telling Speer, "the thing that matters from now on is what can we hang on to which will carry us through the period after a lost war. To help us with that, you have to stay at your post!"
