= Edward T. Dicker =

American politician (1913–1981)

Member of the Texas House of Representatives from the 50-5 district
- In office January 9, 1951 – Jan 13, 1953
- Preceded by: Douglas Berman
- Succeeded by: District abolished

Personal details
- Born: May 23, 1913 Virginia, U.S.
- Died: February 15, 1981 (aged 67) Dallas, Texas, U.S.
- Party: Republican

Edward T. Dicker (May 23, 1913 – February 15, 1981) was an American politician from Texas who represented Dallas County in the Texas House of Representatives for a single term during the 52nd Texas Legislature. He was the only Republican to serve in the Texas Legislature between 1931 and 1961.

== Biography ==
Dicker was born in Virginia on May 23, 1913. He later moved to Texas in 1944 and bought a ranch in Roanoke.

Dicker was elected in the 1950 general election, defeating Democratic nominee Walter J. Reid, who had defeated incumbent Douglas Berman in the Democratic primary. Dicker was the first Republican elected to the Texas legislature in 20 years, the previous being Reno Andrew Eickenroht. He served in the 52nd Texas Legislature from January 9, 1951, to January 13, 1953. He served on the following committees during his term in office: Constitutional Amendments; Counties; Penitentiaries; and Revenue and Taxation. Alongside Democratic state senator Rudolph Weinert, he introduced what became known as the Weinert-Dicker Bill, which allowed the Republican Party in Texas to become a recognized entity. He did not run for reelection in 1952.

He did campaign work for the Texas Eisenhower committee in 1952. In 1960, he worked on the Nixon campaign. In 1964, he opposed the candidacy of Barry Goldwater and headed the National Chairman of Republicans for Johnson. He died on February 15, 1981, in Dallas, Texas and is buried at Sparkman-Hillcrest Memorial Park Cemetery.
