= Hisa Yoneyama =

Japanese politician (1897–1981)

- 米山 久

Member of the House of Representatives
- In office 10 April 1946 – 31 March 1947
- Preceded by: Constituency established
- Succeeded by: Multi-member district
- Constituency: Ishikawa at-large

Personal details
- Born: 17 January 1897 Kanazawa, Ishikawa, Japan
- Died: 9 February 1981 (aged 84)
- Party: Socialist

Hisako Yoneyama (Japanese: 米山久; 17 January 1897 – 9 February 1981) was a Japanese poet, activist and politician. She was one of the first group of women elected to the House of Representatives in 1946.

== Biography ==
Yoneyama was born in Kanazawa in 1897 and attended Kanazawa First Girl's High School. She joined Ichikawa Fusae's women's suffrage movement and became director of the Kanaza regional branch of the National Defence Women's Association of Japan and deputy director of the Ishikawa Prefecture section.

She contested the 1946 general elections, the first in which women could vote, as a Japan Socialist Party candidate in Ishikawa, and was elected to the House of Representatives. She ran for re-election in 1947, but was unsuccessful. She subsequently worked as an advisor to the Japan Buddhist Women's Federation and became involved in the Buddhist Women's Movement.

Yoneyama died in 1981. Ishikawa did not have another female member of parliament until Mieko Tanaka in 2009.
