= Joseph Smith (footballer, born 1888) =

English footballer

Joe Smith
Personal information
- Full name: Joseph Smith
- Date of birth: 1888
- Place of birth: Sutton-on-Trent, Nottinghamshire
- Date of death: January 1928 (aged 40)
- Place of death: Burton upon Trent, Staffordshire
- Position: Full-back

Senior career*
Years	Team	Apps	(Gls)
- Worksop Town
- Kiveton Park
1907–13	Sheffield United	48	(0)
1913–14	South Shields		
1914	Derby County	6	(0)
- * Club domestic league appearances and goals

Joseph Smith (1888 – January 1928) was an English footballer who played as a full-back. Born in Sutton-on-Trent, Nottinghamshire, he played in The Football League for Sheffield United and Derby County.

== Career ==
Smith began his career with Worksop Town before moving to Kiveton Park and then signing amateur terms for Sheffield United in 1907. Turning professional later the same year, Smith was to spend six seasons with United, but largely played in the reserve team. Smith did not make his first team debut until 1910 and was often injured due to his style of play which the local press described as "reckless" and suggesting that "... if he does not kill someone first, he will end up killing himself." Nicknamed 'old aeroplane' due to his habit of tackling with his arms and legs flailing, Smith finally begun to make regular first team appearances by 1911, but he soon broke his collar bone and lost his place in the side, eventually being placed on the transfer list.

Smith moved to South Shields in 1913 but spent only one season with the north-east club before joining Derby County in August 1914. Having played six league games for Derby, Smith lost his place once more and retired from football, setting up a business in Burton upon Trent where he lived until his death in 1928.
