= Richard Honig =

German penologist (1890–1981)

Richard M. Honig
- Born: 3 January 1890; Gnesen, Posen, Germany
- Died: 25 February 1981 (aged 91); Göttingen, West Germany

Richard Martin Honig (German: [ˈhoːnɪç]; 3 January 1890 – 25 February 1981) was a German penologist.

== Life ==
Richard Honig obtained his habilitation in 1919 and was appointed professor in 1925 in Göttingen. In 1933, he was forced from the university due to his Jewish heritage and his opposition to the Nazi policies. The same year, he was invited to join the newly founded University of Istanbul and emigrated to Turkey. There, he wrote a Turkish Introduction into jurisprudence and to philosophy of law (both 1934 f.). In 1939, he emigrated to the USA. Beginning in 1954 and after his retirement in the USA in 1963, he came regularly to teach American law and comparative law and conduct research stints to Germany, in particular in Göttingen. In 1974, the widowed Honig moved permanently to Göttingen, where he resided until his death on 25 February 1981 at the age of ninety-one.

== Works ==
- Die Einwilligung des Verletzten, 1919
- Studien zur juristischen und natürlichen Handlungseinheit, 1925
- Die straflose Vortat und Nachtat, 1927
- Römisches Recht, 1936
- Kirchenrecht, 1954
- Wiederaufnahme im amerikanischen Strafverfahren, 1969
- Schwurgericht, 1974
