= Carl Kruse-Jensen =

Norwegian judge and diplomat (1889–1981)

- Born: 9 August 1889; Christiania, Norway
- Died: 17 February 1981 (aged 91)
- Occupation: Judge
- Awards: Order of St. Olav (1953)

Carl Kruse-Jensen (9 August 1889 – 17 February 1981) was a Norwegian jurist, diplomat and international judge.

He was born in Christiania, a son of Christian August Jensen and Elisabeth Marie Olsen. He graduated as cand.jur. in 1912, and later served as judge and consul. He was appointed Justice of the Supreme Court of Norway from 1945 to 1959. He was decorated Commander of the Order of St. Olav in 1953. He died in February 1981.
