= Joseph Smith (pianist) =

American pianist (1948–2015)

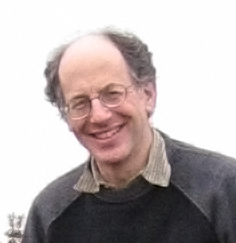
Joseph Robert Smith, 2006

Joseph Robert Smith (July 4, 1948 – March 23, 2015) was an American pianist, author, and lecturer. The son of Robert Paul Smith and Elinor Goulding Smith, Smith was a long-time student of pianist Seymour Bernstein.

== Career ==
Smith gave nearly-annual New York recitals from 1974 to 1991. His 1987 recital at Alice Tully Hall included two unpublished piano works by George Gershwin, "Novelette in Fourths" and "Rubato".

Smith recorded about a dozen LPs and CDs, many of them anthologies of related piano pieces by different composers. Gershwin scholar Edward Jablonski included one of Smith's CDs, Rhythmic Moments, in a Gershwin discography even though it contained only three Gershwin pieces, because "the collection is valuable in part because of the non-Gershwin activity... even without Gershwin this would be a fetching collection of musical Americana."

Smith was known for bringing public attention to piano works of musical worth that had fallen into obscurity for non-musical reasons. His "Rare Finds" column in Piano Today magazine combined editions of piano pieces with essays about the piece and the composer. David Dubal wrote that "Smith's editions of rare piano musics are exemplary, and his articles in the magazine Piano Today are eagerly read." He published books combining essays and sheet music, in some cases with a bound-in CD of his own performances. He also presented his ideas in recitals, recordings, books, and radio broadcasts. Stuart Isacoff called him "a walking encyclopedia of the piano" and credited him with help in writing A Natural History of the Piano. He also appeared in the documentary film, Seymour: An Introduction.

Smith taught "Introduction to Music" for over ten years at the John J. Cali School of Montclair State University, and was on the faculty at Montclair's Stokes Forest Music Camp. He had a special interest in the composers John Field, Percy Grainger, Edvard Grieg, Charles Griffes, Robert Schumann, and Carl Maria von Weber and produced a recording of Griffes: Piano Music

Benita Meshulam, a pianist and friend of Smith, wrote in tribute to him:

"Joe was the most curious musician I have ever known, always looking for forgotten works, studying them thoroughly. He was interested not only in the works but the composers and investigated everything. He was a pianist who didn't care about the condition of the pianos he performed on. It was his message that he wanted to get across – a real musician's musician who lived and breathed his art. He was also the kindest and most generous colleague."

An example of Smith's style of analysis is provided by his essay in Piano magazine, based on a 2013 seminar he conducted at the New England Conservatory of Music, entitled Hand Divisions (an ethical, technical, or esthetic issue?) Smith wrote:

A colleague recently asked me if I condoned ‘cheating’ by redistributing material between the hands, or if I was a ‘purist’ who maintained that distribution must be precisely ‘as the composer wrote it....’ (for convenience, let’s call these two positions ‘divisionist’ and ‘anti-divisionist’). Is this really purely a question of ethics? Is divisionism no more than a naughty indulgence?.... This does not mean, however, that there may not be legitimate limits to divisionism. The absolute divisionist position is encapsulated in the familiar formula, ‘I don’t care if you play it with your nose, as long as...’ (though so far, I have never encountered a passage facilitated by this means). In other words, the arrangement of the notes that enables us to execute a passage comfortably, reliably and accurately is always justified. But like anti-divisionism this attitude is based on a very questionable assumption. It presumes that because sound is primary to musical performance, visual appearance is necessarily irrelevant. In fact, however, most of the literature of music was composed to be played live, rather than recorded — the musician’s visual presence is unavoidably part of his or her performance. Since this is so, is it not possible that the division between hands must sometimes take the visual into account? To give an extreme example, if we saw a pianist playing Scriabin’s left-hand Nocturne with two hands, would we not feel dissatisfied, no matter how beautiful the sound?

== Recordings ==
- "American" Piano Music by European Composers (Musical Heritage Society)
- Grieg and Grainger Piano Music (Musical Heritage Society)
- Joaquin Turina, Seymour Bernstein, Felix Mendelssohn, Abram Chasins (Orion – ORS 81402)
- Rhythmic Moments: Piano Pieces by "Popular Music" Composers
- From Foster to Ellington (Premier 1028)
- Burleigh: From the Southland (includes songs and piano works) (Premier)
- Let My Song Fill Your Heart: A Remembrance of the American Concert Song (Premier)
- Romancing the Piano (included with piano anthology of this name) (Ekay)
- Rare Finds (included with piano anthology of this name) (Ekay)
- Familiar Melodies: Transcription, Variations, Fantasies (Brioso 126)
- Piano Waltzes from Beethoven to Poulenc (Brioso 142)
- Piano Barcarolles: from Veniceto the Mississippi (Brioso 155)
- Griffes Piano Music (Arkiv 70001)

== Books and editions ==
- Four Early 20th Century Piano Suites by Black Composers (Coleridge-Taylor, Burleigh, Dett, Matthews) (G. Schirmer ISBN 0-7935-7604-0)
- Burleigh: From the Southland, ISBN 0-7935-7312-2
- American Piano Classics (Civil War era through early twenties) (Dover Publications ISBN 978-0486413778)
- Percy Grainger: Country Gardens and Other Works for Piano (Dover ISBN 0-486-42241-0)
- Great Waltzes for Solo Piano (includes pieces from Beethoven to Hindemith) (Dover ISBN 0-486-43119-3)
- Favorite Nocturnes and Other Piano Works by John Field (Dover ISBN 0-486-44159-8)
- Tangos, Milongas, and Other Latin-American Dances for Solo Piano (Cervantes, Morel, Nazareth, etc.) (Dover ISBN 0-486-42787-0)
- Piano Discoveries (each with an essay) (Ekay Music ISBN 0-943748-86-0)
- Romancing the Piano (by 22 different composers, includes a CD) (Steinway Library ISBN 1-929009-21-6)
- Rare Finds for Piano (each with an essay, includes a CD) (Steinway Library, Ekay Music ISBN 1-929009-53-4)
- Rubinstein: Variations sur l’air Yankee Doodle (introduction by Smith) (Musica Obscura Editions)
- Simply Romantic Piano (easier repertoire from the Romantic era) (Steinway Library, Ekay Music ISBN 1-929009-52-6)
- Mano Sinistra: Etudes for the Cultivation of the Left Hand (International Music Company, No. 3646)

=== Lecture-recital videos ===
Complete lecture-recital

Verdi’s’ Miserere Re-Composed by Gottschalk, Liszt, and Jelly Roll Morton

Individual pieces, with Smith's commentary

Amy Beach: Scottish Legend
Alexandr Borodin: Mazurka
Ignacio Cervantes: Te quiero tanto ("This danza has a text secretly hidden in the rhythm of the music...")

=== Performances ===
Charles-Valentin Alkan: Barcarolette No.1 from Sketches, Op.63 (Smith's performance begins at 4:40)
Amy Beach: Hermit Thrush at Dawn
Harry Burleigh: A New Hiding Place
Frédéric Chopin: "Chopin Nocturne in Eb Op. 9 No. 2 with too many authentic ornaments"
Frédéric Chopin: Fantasy Impromptu in c#, Alternate Version
Charles T. Griffes: The White Peacock
Ambroise Thomas: Fantasy on Scottish Melody "Auld Lang Syne"
