= Ignacio Cervantes =

Cuban pianist and composer (1847–1905)

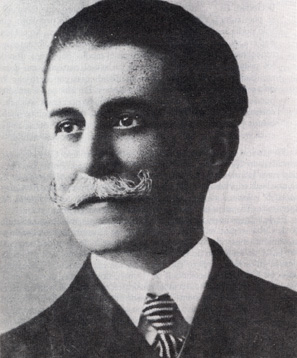
- Cervantes c. 1900
- Born: Ignacio Cervantes Kawanagh; 31 July 1847; Havana, Captaincy General of Cuba
- Died: 29 April 1905 (aged 57); Havana, Cuba
- Education: Conservatoire de Paris
- Spouse: María Amparo Fernández Richeaux
- Children: 14, including María Cervantes
- Musical career
- Instrument: Piano

Ignacio Cervantes Kawanagh (Note: Also cited as Ignacio Cervantes Kawanag.) (31 July 1847 – 29 April 1905) was a Cuban pianist and composer. Cervantes was influential in the creolization of Cuban music.

== Biography ==
Cervantes was born Ignacio Cervantes Kawanagh on 31 July 1847 in Havana, during the Captaincy General of Cuba. From 1859 to 1861, Cervantes studied under Louis Moreau Gottschalk and piano under Nicolás Ruiz Espadero. Enrolling at the Conservatoire de Paris in 1865, Cervantes studied under Antoine François Marmontel and Charles-Valentin Alkan. Cervantes won the piano award in 1866, and awards in piano and harmony in 1868. Put forward as a candidate for the Prix de Rome, Cervantes was ultimately unable to compete as he was not French.

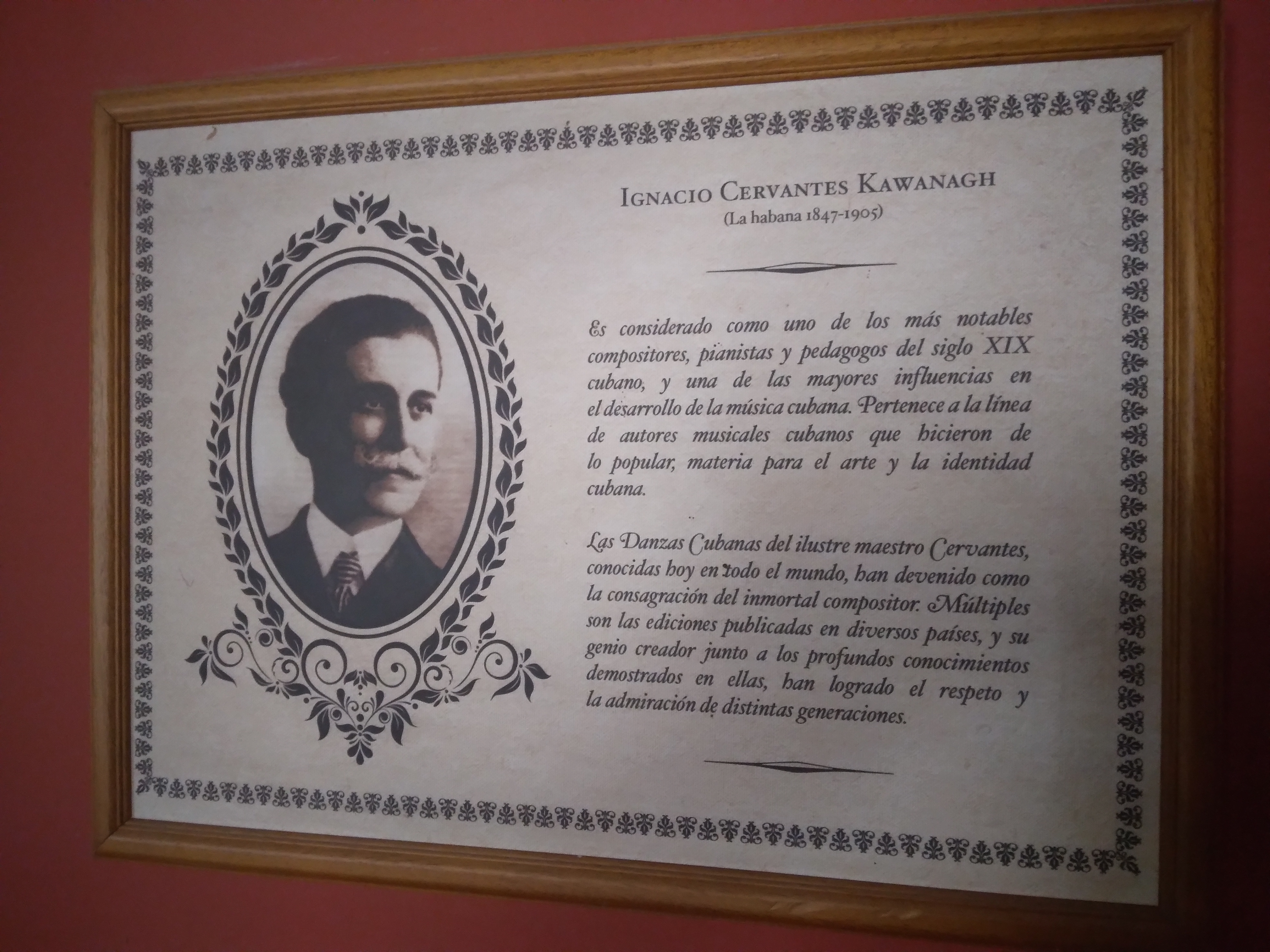
A plaque to Cervantes on the wall of Café O'Reilly in Havana; one of a group of plaques celebrating Cubans of Irish lineage

Following a short stay in Madrid, Cervantes returned to Cuba in 1870. In 1872, Cervantes married María Amparo Fernández Richeaux. The couple had 14 children, including the pianist, singer and composer María Cervantes. In 1875, Cervantes and José White left Cuba when warned by the Governor-General: he had found out that they had been giving concerts all over the country to raise money for the rebel cause in the Ten Years' War. In the United States and Mexico Cervantes continued to raise money by giving concerts until the Pact of Zanjón brought a lull in conflict. He returned in 1878 and left again in 1895 when the Cuban War of Independence started.

Cervantes wrote one opera (Maledetto, 1895), various chamber pieces (Scherzo cappricioso, 1885), zarzuelas, and the famous forty-one Danzas Cubanas. He also conducted for the Opera company at Havana's Payret Theater. His Fusión de Almas was written to his daughter, María Cervantes.

On 29 April 1905, Cervantes died in Havana aged 57.
