= Gerry Hartigan =

Australian rules footballer, born 1905

Personal information
- Full name: Gerry Hartigan
- Born: 8 January 1905
- Died: 14 February 1981 (aged 76)

Playing career^{1}
Years	Club	Games (Goals)
1931	Essendon	1 (1)
- ^{1} Playing statistics correct to the end of 1931.

Gerry Hartigan (8 January 1905 – 14 February 1981) was an Australian rules footballer who played with Essendon in the Victorian Football League (VFL).
