= Nándor von Orbán =

Hungarian modern pentathlete

Personal information
- Born: 10 February 1910 Kecskemét, Hungary
- Died: 10 February 1981 (aged 71) Budapest, Hungary

Sport
- Sport: Modern pentathlon

Nándor von Orbán (10 February 1910 – 10 February 1981) was a Hungarian modern pentathlete. He competed at the 1936 Summer Olympics.
