= Wally Laidlaw =

Australian rules footballer

Personal information
- Full name: Walter Thomas Laidlaw
- Born: 24 July 1891; Footscray, Victoria
- Died: 18 February 1981 (aged 89); Macleod, Victoria
- Height: 178 cm (5 ft 10 in)
- Weight: 69 kg (152 lb)

Playing career^{1}
Years	Club	Games (Goals)
1914, 1919	South Melbourne	3 (0)
- ^{1} Playing statistics correct to the end of 1919.

Walter Thomas Laidlaw (24 July 1891 – 18 February 1981) was an Australian rules footballer who played with South Melbourne in the Victorian Football League (VFL).
