= Hector B. McKinnon =

Hector Brown McKinnon, CC, CMG (December 6, 1890 – February 2, 1981) was a Canadian civil servant. During his career, he served as chairman of the Tariff Board and president of the Commodity Prices Stabilisation Corporation.

He was invested as a Companion of the Order of Canada, the nation's highest honour for his work in federal government revenue work spanning four decades.

McKinnon died in Ottawa at the National Defence Medical Centre. He was predeceased by his wife (Phyllis Wilson) and one son (Neil), but was survived by one other son (Donald).
