= Joe Smith (winger) =

English footballer

Personal information
- Full name: Joseph Stanley Smith
- Date of birth: Unknown
- Place of birth: Keswick, England
- Date of death: Unknown
- Position: Winger

Senior career*
Years	Team	Apps	(Gls)
	Keswick	?	(?)
1904–1905	Burnley	15	(1)
- * Club domestic league appearances and goals

Joseph Stanley Smith was an English professional footballer who played as a winger.
