= Joe Frazer Smith =

American architect (1897–1957)

- Born: March 25, 1897; Canton, Mississippi, U.S.
- Died: April 13, 1957 (aged 60); Memphis, Tennessee, U.S.
- Education: Georgia Institute of Technology
- Occupations: Architect, author
- Spouse: Ada McDonnell
- Parent(s): Charles Foster Smith; Susan Cheek

Joe Frazer Smith (March 25, 1897 – April 13, 1957) was an American architect and author.

== Early life ==
Joe Frazer Smith was born on March 25, 1897, in Canton, Mississippi. He graduated from the Georgia Institute of Technology in 1921.

== Career ==
Smith became an architect in Memphis, Tennessee in 1922. With Herbert Burnham, he designed the mansion of the president of Rhodes College in Memphis in 1926. He designed Castle Crest in Jackson, Mississippi in 1929–1930, which is listed on the National Register of Historic Places. In 1938, he designed Dixie Homes, public housing for African Americans in Memphis.

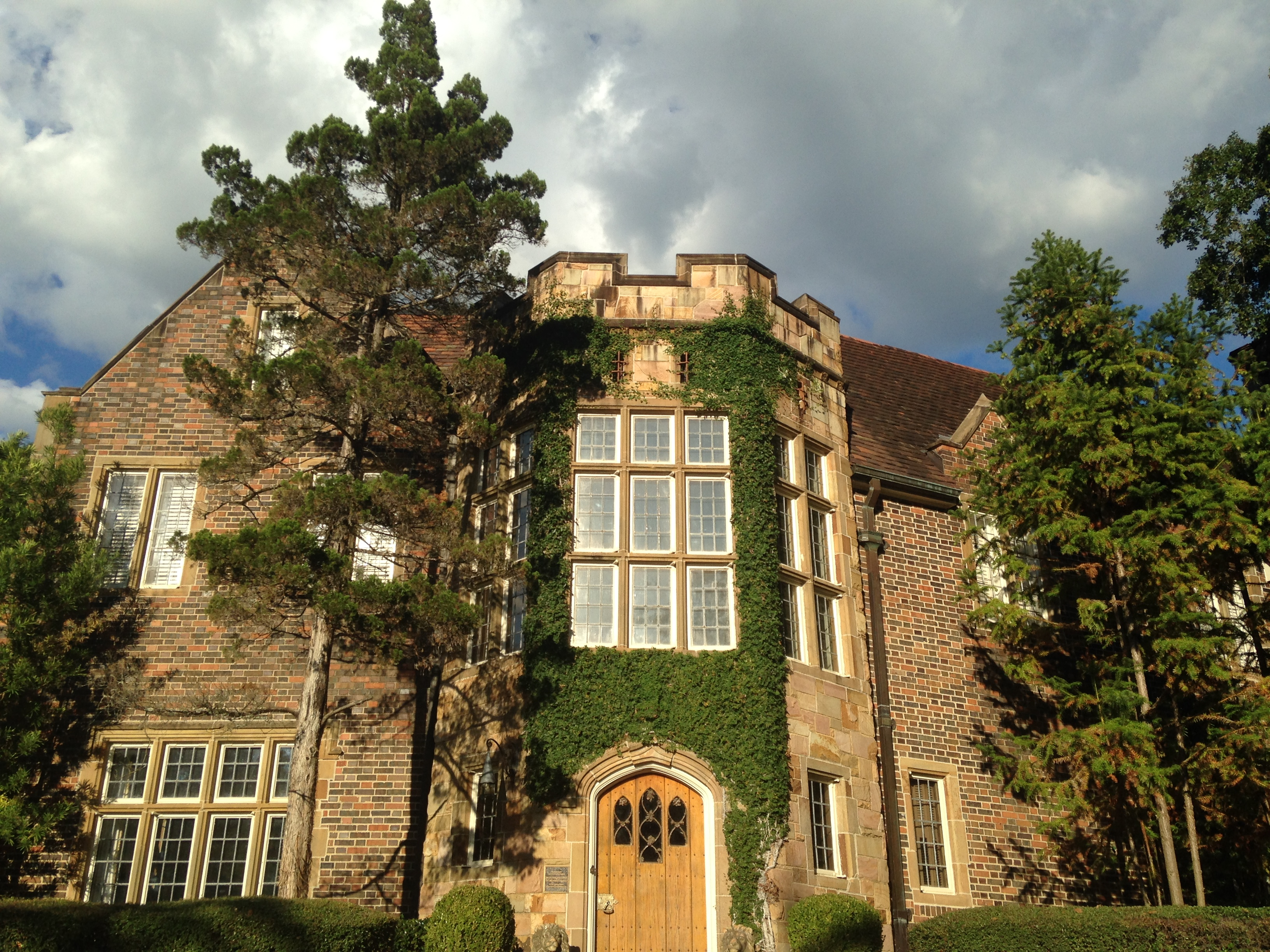
Castle Crest, a mansion in Jackson, Mississippi designed by Smith.

Smith authored a book about historic mansions in the Southeastern United States. It was published as White Pillars: Early Life and Architecture of the Lower Mississippi Valley Country and later retitled Plantation Houses and Mansions of the Old South. In particular, Smith describes plantation homes in Kentucky, Tennessee (Nashville and Franklin), Mississippi (Port Gibson and Natchez), Louisiana (East Feliciana Parish and West Feliciana Parish), and Alabama (Mobile). In a review for The Journal of Southern History, Edwin Adams Davis called the book "a delightful combination of architecture and history" as well as "a major contribution to southern historiography."

== Personal life and death ==
Smith married Ada McDonnell in 1922. He died on April 13, 1957, in Memphis.

== Works ==
- Smith, Joe Frazer (1941). White Pillars: Early Life and Architecture of the Lower Mississippi Valley Country. New York: Bramhall House. ISBN 9780517034682. OCLC 691733.
