= Charles E. Waring =

American chemist and educator

- Born: January 24, 1909; Philadelphia, Pennsylvania, US
- Died: February 16, 1981 (aged 72); Hartford, Connecticut, US
- Education: Ohio State University (MS, PhD); Muskingum College (BS)
- Spouse: Geraldine Howald
- Scientific career
- Fields: Chemical kinetics
- Workplaces: University of Connecticut; Polytechnic Institute of Brooklyn

Charles Emmett Waring (January 24, 1909 – February 16, 1981) was an American physical chemist and educator.

== Life and career ==
Specializing in chemical kinetics, Waring served as a professor of chemistry at the University of Connecticut (UConn) from 1946 to 1979, spending twenty years as department chair between 1946 and 1966. He increased the number of chemistry faculty from 9 to 22, launched one of the university's first doctoral programs, and advised 24 PhD students and nine MS students.

Born in Philadelphia, Waring earned his BS from Muskingum College in 1931 and his MS and PhD from Ohio State University in 1934 and 1936. In 1939, he won a Lalor Foundation fellowship to conduct research at Oxford University with Nobel laureate Cyril Norman Hinshelwood. He taught for ten years at the Polytechnic Institute of Brooklyn before joining UConn. Waring also served as a technical advisor for the US Defense Department during World War II and thereafter from 1946 to 1966.

Containing 64 modern laboratories, the research wing of UConn's Chemistry Building was named in Waring's honor in 1998. The Waring Chemistry Building, the former home of the chemistry department, was renamed the Philip E. Austin Building.

Waring married Geraldine Howald on December 19, 1936. He died at Hartford Hospital after a long illness in 1981.
