= Petrykivka painting =

Traditional Ukrainian decorative painting style

Petrykivka decorative painting as a phenomenon of the Ukrainian ornamental folk art
- UNESCO Intangible Cultural Heritage
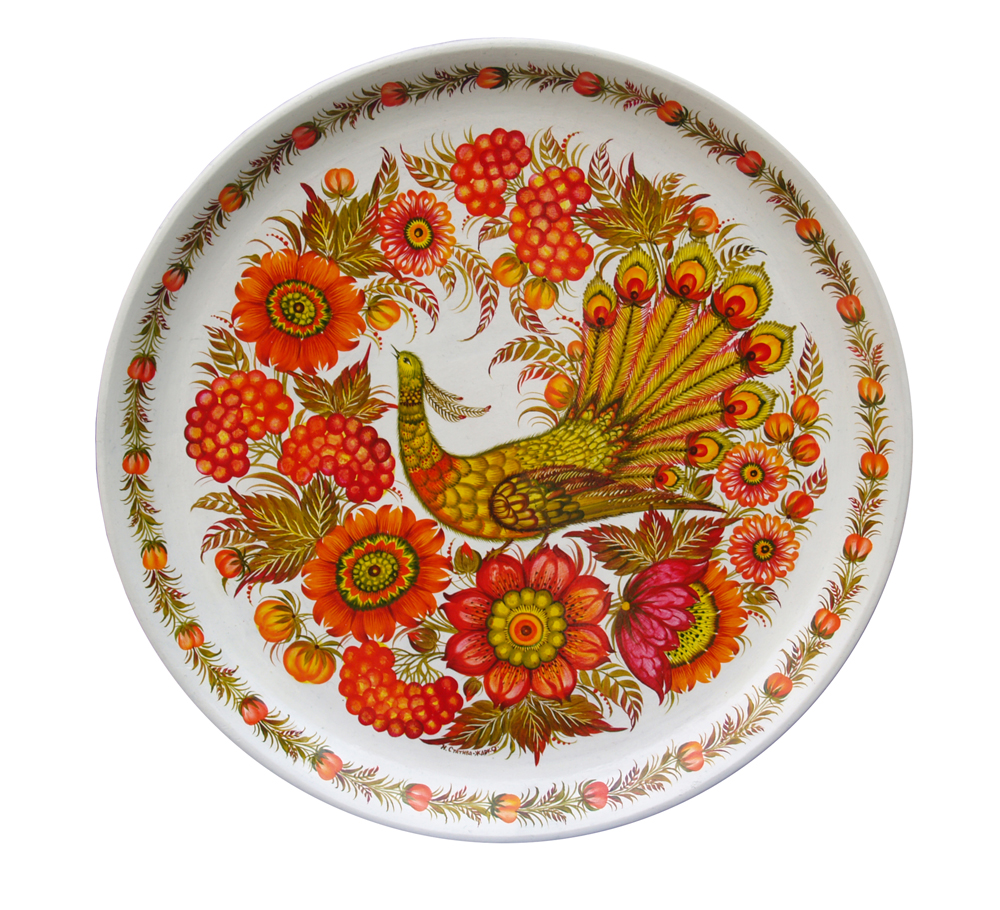
- Decorative plate "August" by Natalia Statyva-Zharko
- Country: Ukraine
- Reference: 00893
- Region: Europe and North America

Inscription history
- Inscription: 2013
- List: Representative

Petrykivka painting (or simply "Petrykivka"; Ukrainian: Петриківський розпис) is a traditional Ukrainian decorative painting style, originating from the rural settlement of Petrykivka in Dnipropetrovsk Oblast of Ukraine, where it was traditionally used to decorate house walls and everyday household items. The earliest known examples of this style date from the 18th century, but it continues to thrive and develop as a modern art form.

The distinctive features of this folk art style are its flower patterns, distinctive brush techniques, and its traditionally white background (contemporary painters, however, often work on black, green, red or blue backgrounds).

In 2012, the Ministry of Culture of Ukraine recognized Petrykivka painting as part of the intangible cultural heritage of Ukraine, and it was included in the UNESCO Representative List of the Intangible Cultural Heritage of Humanity in 2013. Petrykivka painting has become a "brand" in Ukrainian popular culture, and a "Petrykivka" trademark belonging to the artisans of Petrykivka village has been created.

== History ==
=== Early history ===
It is believed that Petrivka painting originated from mural decorations of village houses. Painted wall decorations were prevalent in many parts of Ukraine, and different regions had their own characteristic styles. It was traditional for the painting to be restored once or twice each year. In addition to murals, household items made of wood and other materials were also decorated, particularly chests (and especially wedding chests). Later, the tradition of "mal'ovky" (мальовки) arose, in which paintings made in advance by a master on paper could be used to decorate house walls without a painter needing to visit them in person. There are also examples of 18th century religious icons from the Dnipro region that have floral ornamentation which could also be considered an ancestor of the modern Petrikivka style.

The oldest Ukrainian wall paintings with floral ornaments date from the second half of the 19th and beginning of the 20th century in the Dnipropetrovsk, Sloboda, Podillia, and Uman regions, and they likely have a relationship or common origin with the Petrykivka style.

Ornamental painting on walls and on paper were common in many villages of the Dnipropetrovsk area, but were most prevalent and highly developed in the village of Petrykivka, from which the style takes its name. Mural decoration of homes have existed in Petrykivka from at least 1860, and works on paper - from the late nineteenth century. From the time of the Nova Sich in the mid-1700s until the middle of the nineteenth century, these lands were primarily populated by settlers from the Poltava and Sloboda regions, and it is possible that these migrants brought this painting tradition to Petrykivka. No descriptions of wall decoration exist for the Poltava area in the nineteenth century, but there were reports of mural decoration in Sloboda region, such as from 1860 in the Kupiansk area of Kharkiv Oblast. Therefore, it has been proposed that the Petrykivka tradition originated from the Sloboda region. However, there also exist boxes with decorative floral painting from Poltava dating from the second half of the nineteenth century. Yet another alternative hypothesis is that this painting style came from Podillia via Uman. However, murals with floral ornaments appeared there only much later.

=== Recognition and establishment (1911–1936) ===
No detailed historical references to Petrykivka painting exist before the beginning of the 20th century, when the ethnographer Dmytro Yavornytsky took an interest in it, and had Yevhenia Evenbakh, one of his students, make copies and collect samples (including murals) in two expeditions in 1911 and 1913. These "discoveries" formed the basis of a 1913 exhibition in Saint Petersburg. Another early researcher of Petrykivka painting was Yevhenia Berchenko, who organized exhibitions in 1928 Leningrad.

Exhibitions by Petrykivka artists took place in 1935 and 1936 in Kyiv, Leningrad, and Moscow, and featured works by Tatiana Pata, Nadia Bilokin', Yaryna Pylypenko, Hanna Isaiev, Vasyl' Vovk, and Ganna Pavlenko. This greatly popularized Petrikivka painting, which had until then been almost unknown among the general public. After these exhibits, Tatiana Pata and Nadia Bilokin' were awarded the honorary title of "Master of Folk Art".

Also in 1935 and 1936, a special two-year school of decorative painting took place in Petrykivka. The main instructor was Tatiana Pata, who taught an entire generation of artists who would go on to establish Petrykivka painting as a contemporary art form. Tatiana Pata is often considered to be the founder of the Petrykivka school of painting, although in reality she was only continuing a tradition which she had learned from her grandmother.

=== Petrykivka artists in Kyiv ===
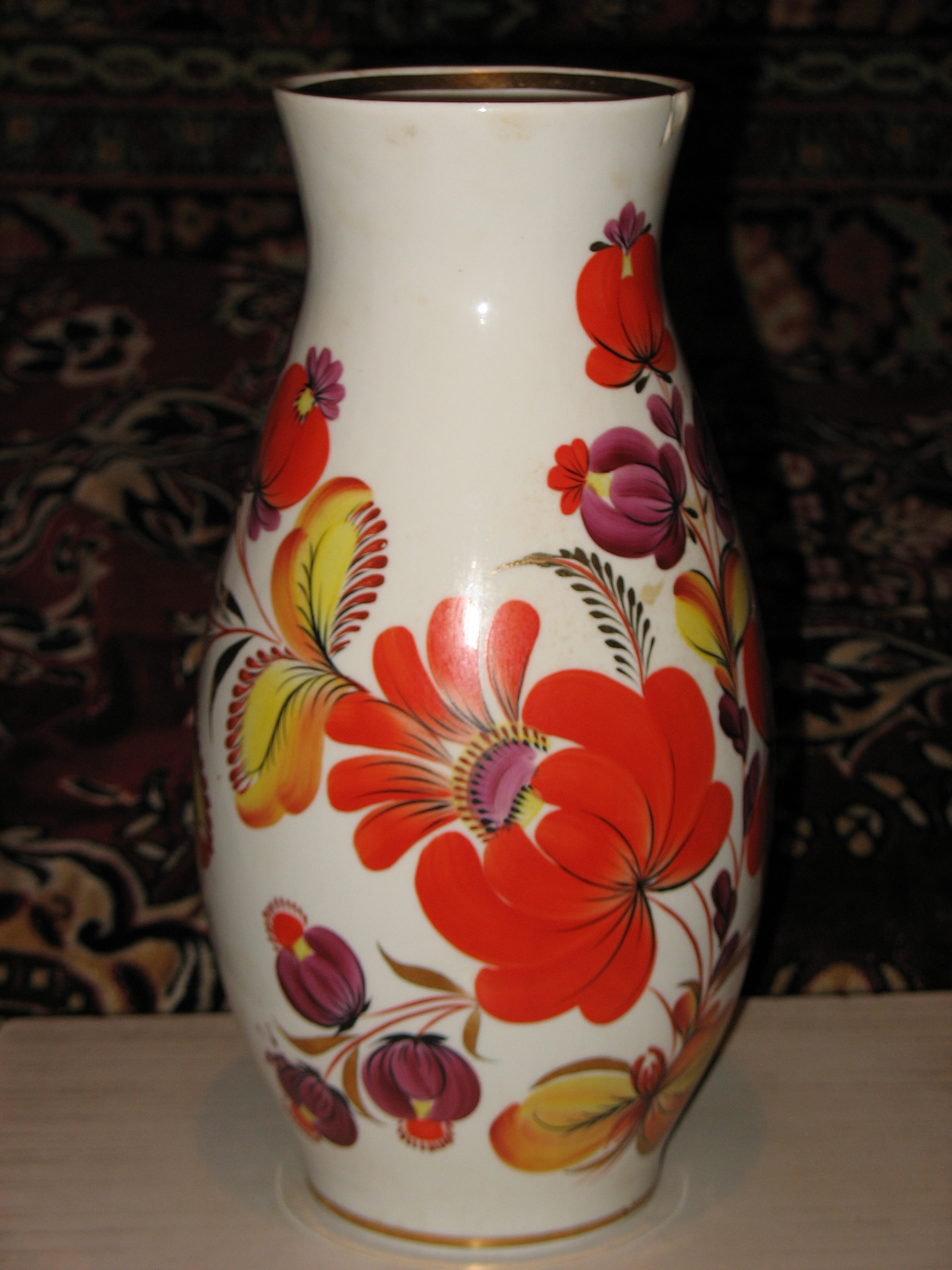
Kyiv porcelain vase with petrykivka painting by Marfa Tymchenko

Several students of Tatiana Pata moved to Kyiv in 1936–1944, which lead to the first use of Petrykivka painting in industrial production at the Kyiv Taras Shevchenko Souvenir Factory ("Київська сувенірна фабрика ім. Т. Г. Шевченка"). It was here that varnish-covered painting on a nontraditional black background was first introduced, a technique which later also came to be used in Petrykivka village itself. This became the most prevalent form of Petrikivka painting during Soviet times.

These artists also began to use the Petrykivka style for porcelain decoration. The first such attempt was by Halyna Pavlenko in 1936 while studying at the Kyiv School of Folk Arts (later the Kyiv Art and Industry College - "Київський художньо-промисловий технікум"). In 1937 and 1938, she was joined by Vira Pavlenko, Marfa Tymchenko and Pelahia Hlushchenko.

Porcelain decoration in the Petrykivka style was developed further in 1944 by the Pavlenko sisters and Vira Klymenko-Zhukov at the Kyiv Experimental Ceramic Art Factory [12] [13]. Marfa Tymchenko also joined that factory in 1953, and her work there was widely recognized. Porcelain vases personally decorated by Marfa Tymchenko were given as gifts by Soviet leaders to foreign dignitaries, including Richard Nixon, Mao Zedong, Fidel Castro, and Josip Broz Tito.

=== Development from 1950 to 1980 ===
An atelier for textile production had existed in Petrykivka since 1929. In 1958, a cooperative workshop was created in that atelier for the production of varnished Petrykivka painted objects. The artists in that workshop included some of Tatiana Pata's most talented students. In 1958, the staff of the workshop included Hanna Isaieva, Yavdokha Kliupa, Maria Shyshats'ka, Nadia Shulyk, Ivan Zavhorodnii, Halyna Prudnikova, Oleksandra Pikush, Vira Tezyk, Nina Turchyn, Hanna Danyleiko, and (beginning in 1959) Zoia Kudish. In 1961, the cooperative was reorganized as the "Friendship" Factory of Petrikivka Painting ("Фабрика петриківського розпису «Дружба»"). Most products of the factory, particularly boxes and dishes, were made of pressed sawdust, which were covered in black paint, decorated, and then varnished. The artistic director of the factory until 1970 was Fedir Panko. From 1970-1988 this position was held by Vasyl' Sokolenko, and then by Anatolii Chernus'kyi, Volodymyr Hlushchenko, and Serhii Dreshpak. Its artistic advisory council included such famous masters as Hanna Samars'ka and Yavdokha Kliupa. By the late Soviet period the factory employed about five hundred people. Petrikivka-decorated plates, boxes, trays, vases, and other souvenirs became calling cards of Ukraine, and were exported to 80 different countries. In 2006 the factory was liquidated in bankruptcy, and in 2011 it was completely destroyed by unknown individuals who dismantled the workshops and presses.

The T. Pata Petrykivka Children's Art School ("Петриківська дитяча художня школа ім. Т. Я. Пати") was also created in 1958. Its founding teachers of Petrikivka painting were Fedir Panko and Vasyl' Sokolenko, both students Tatiana Pata. While simultaneously working at the Petrykivka Factory, they taught the art form to the next generation of artists: most of the Petrykivka artists of the second half of the Soviet period were their students. Later, Valentyna Panko and Maria Pikush, both graduates of the School, became instructors there themselves. Pikush became its director in 1995.

A series of albums of Petrykivka painting reproductions edited by the noted art historians Natalia Hlukhen'ka and Borys Butnyk-Sivers'kyi were published in the 1960s and ‘70s. With their large circulation, they did much to further popularize the Petrykivka painting style in Soviet Ukraine.

In 1970, Fedir Panko also founded the Experimental Workshop of Petrykivka Painting ("Експериментальний цех петриківського розпису") under the auspices of the Dnipropetrovsk National Union of Artists of Ukraine in a building in the center of Petrykivka village. In contrast to the Factory of Petrykivka Painting, its works were mainly on wood and paper, and primarily on a light background (as opposed to the black background typically used at the factory). The work of the artists at the Experimental Workshop was more creatively free and diverse than at the Factory, where ordinary artisans primarily copied works by the artistic directors. In addition to Panko, the Workshop included the artists Hanna Isaieva, Nadia Shulyk, Nina Turchyn, Andrii Pikush, Maria Pikush, Tetiana Har'kava, Valentyna Deka, Lidia Bulavin, Maria Yanenko, Natalia Statyva-Zharko, Valentyna Panko, and Halyna Nazarenko.

=== Recent history ===
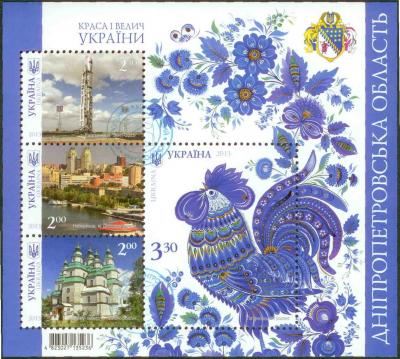
2013 block of postage stamps with a reproduction of the work "Rooster in Flowers" by Volodymyr Hlushchenko, 2009

In 1998, the Experimental Workshop became the basis of the Petrykiva Center of Folk Art under the direction of Andrii Pikush. Today, it is considered to be the nucleus of the Petrikivka painting style. The Center brings together approximately 40 leading Petrykivka artists, including (as of 2011) 25 members of the National Union of Artists of Ukraine and 7 Distinguished Folk Artists of Ukraine. This institution has been a home to such artists as Volodymyr Hlushchenko, Nina Turchyn, Valentyna Deka, Lidia Bulavin, Maria Yanenko, Valentyna Panko, and Halyna Nazarenko. In addition, many significant artists currently live in Petrykivka village but do not work at the Petrykivka Center, and a number of other artists trained in classical Petrykivka painting live and work in various cities throughout Ukraine, where they continue to develop the Petrykivka style.

An annual regional festival of folk art under the name "Petrykivskyi Dyvotsvit" (lit. 'Wonder-Flower of Petrykivka') has taken place since

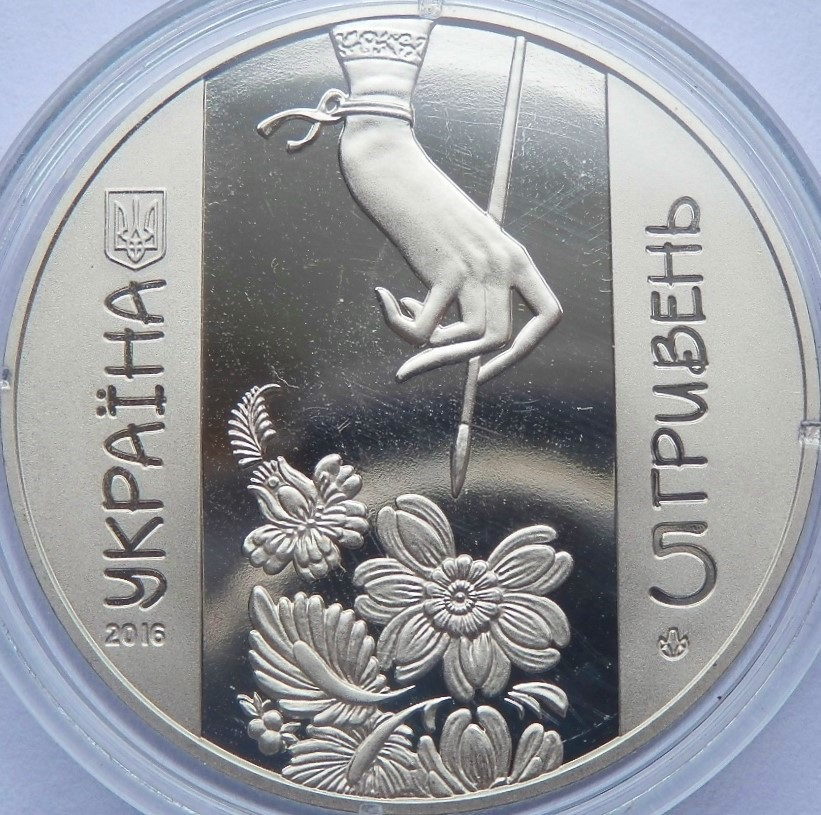
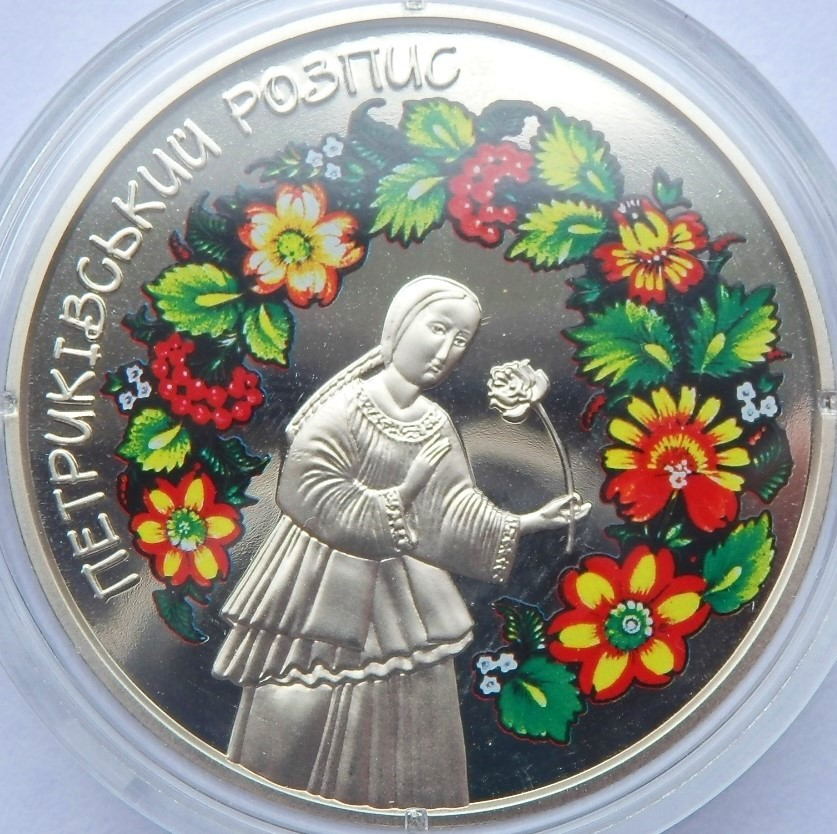

2007, typically in September. It has included markets, workshops, exhibitions, and concerts. In 2013 and 2014, the festival took place in Dnipro, and in subsequent years, in Petrikivka village.

In 2012, the Ukrainian Ministry of Culture recognized Petrykivka painting as part of the intangible cultural heritage of Ukraine, and in December 2013 it was included in the Representative List of the Intangible Cultural Heritage of Humanity by UNESCO.

In January 2013, a "Petrykivka" trademark designed by Liudmyla Horbulia was registered, and was donated for the use of the community of Petrykivka village and its artisans as a symbol of authenticity.

On 26 October 2020, Petrykivka painting became a geographical indication in Ukraine, meaning that some stages of its production process are guaranteed to take place in its area of origin, which determines certain qualities of the product.

== Technique and characteristics ==
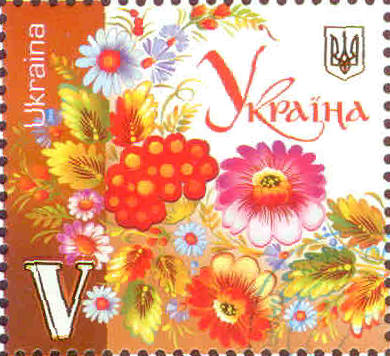
Petrykivka paintings in Ukrainian stamp, 2010

Petrykivka painting is traditionally dominated by plant forms, particularly of flowers. At times, they are depicted as abstracted shapes that do not necessarily correspond to any recognizable, naturally occurring plant species. In other cases, they are based on common garden flowers (e.g. dahlias, asters, tulips, roses), wildflowers (e.g. camomile, cornflower), and other plants (such as vibernum berries, strawberries, and grapes). Acanthus leaves (traditionally referred to as "ferns") and flower buds are also commonly seen. The plant imagery is often combined with birds, and sometimes with images of animals and people, which are often depicted in somewhat fanciful form. Designs also commonly make use of the image of a phoenix or firebird. Historically, Petrykivka painting was done exclusively on white backgrounds (either whitewashed walls or on white paper), but contemporary artists have used backgrounds of a variety of colors, including black, blue, green, and red.

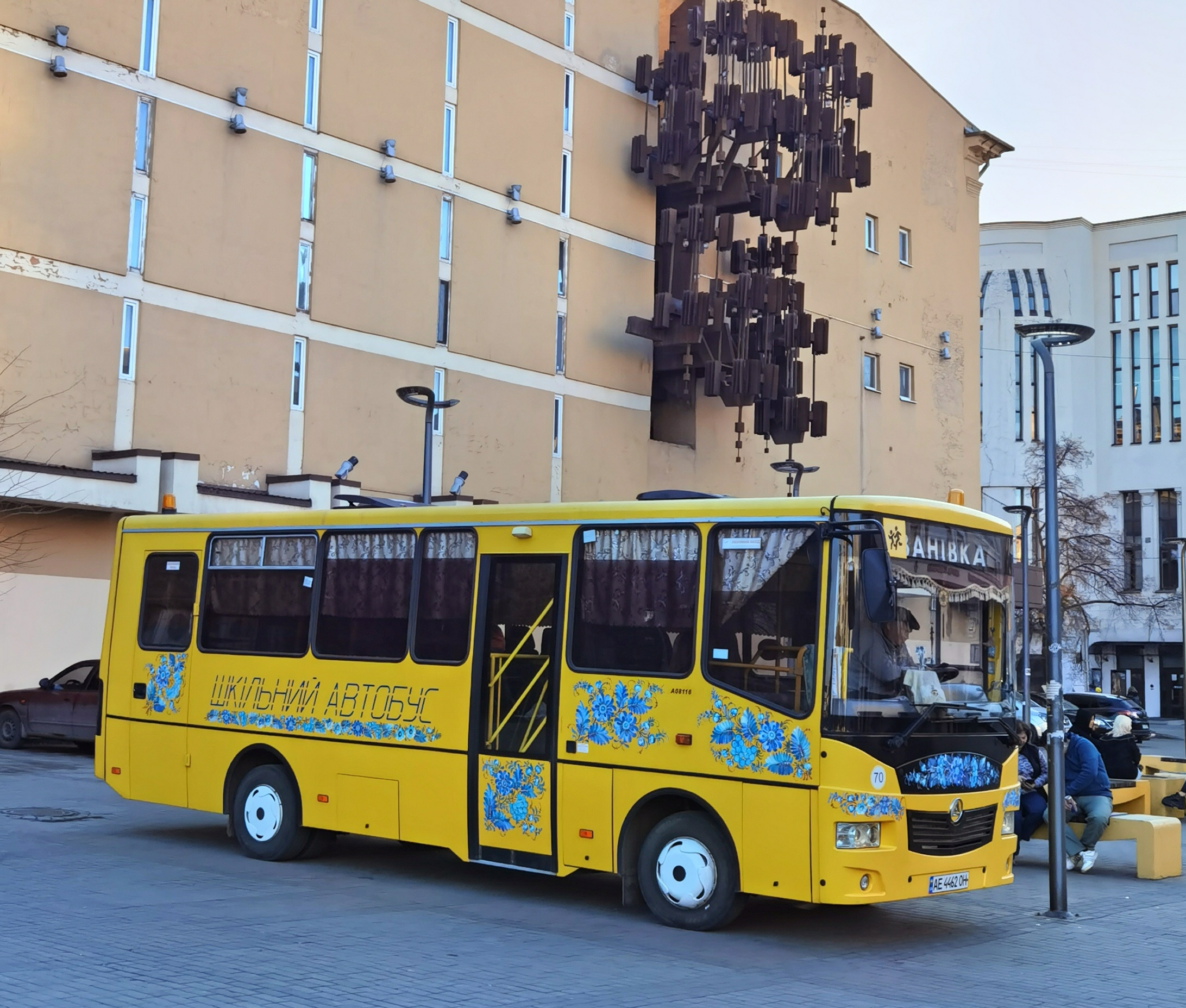
Bus with Petrykivka painting in Dnipro, Ukraine

Petrykivka painting is unabashedly two-dimensional, with no desire to depict "realistic" perspective. The overall design is built around one or more plant stems, to which are attached to all of the key elements of the composition. These stems or branches typically do not overlap each other, and many elements are depicted as silhouettes. Figures of birds, animals, and people are typically depicted in profile, while flowers are usually shown head-on. Many pictorial elements (such as petals, stems, and berries) are depicted using a single brush stroke. For some elements, such as berries, artists will use their finger to apply the paint, resulting in a characteristic round shape that is light in the center and has a darker "ring" at its edge. Professional Petrykivka artists mostly work without pre-drawn sketches and do not use measuring instruments. Instead, they work out the composition in their mind's eye, and do not begin execution until it has been fully thought through.

=== Types of brush strokes ===
Petrykivka painting makes use of four characteristic brush strokes:

- "Hrebinets'" ("Comb") - a brush stroke that begins with a heavier pressure and thick line, then finished with a lighter touch and thin line. So called because a series of such strokes look like a hair comb.
- "Zerniatko" ("Seed") - a brush stroke that is the reverse of the "hrebinets'", with initial light and final heavy pressure. When such strokes are used on either side of a stem, the result resembles an ear of wheat.
- "Horishok" ("Nut") - consists of two "hrebinets'" strokes that are curved and placed next to each other. Filling the resulting central negative space with a "zerniatko" stroke produces a form similar in shape to a hazelnut.
- "Perekhidnyi mazok" ("Transitional stroke") - made by a single brush with two differently colored pigments. A dry brush is dipped first into one (e.g. green) and then another (e.g. yellow) paint. The result is a line of yellow paint, which gradually turns into green.

=== Materials ===
Pigments were traditionally extracted from herbs, leaves, berries and flowers using specific preparation methods. Red was made from cherry juice, green - from grasses and nightshades, and blue - from snowdrop flowers. Various shades of yellow were obtained from sunflower petals, onion skins, and the bark of apple seedlings. Pigments were thinned using egg yolk or milk, and fixed using cherry sap or sugar from sugar beets. Synthetic dyes appeared much later, and gouache and watercolor were used only in the post-war period. The painting tools themselves also were of natural origin: brushes were made from tree shoots, stems of marsh grasses (especially rushes and cattails), and cat hair.

== Well-known artists in the Petrykivka tradition ==
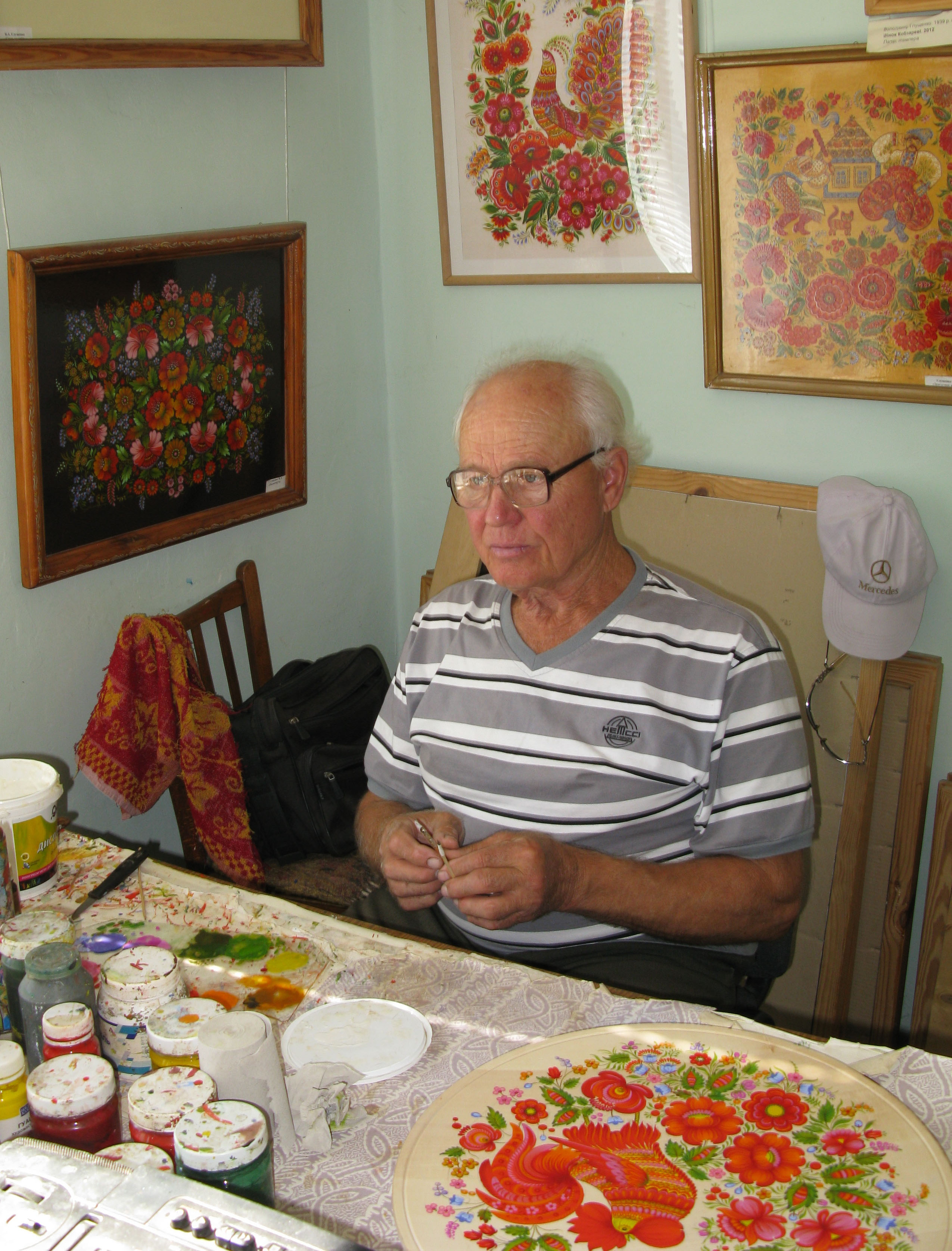
One of the best known petrykivka artists, Volodymyr Hlushchenko, at work in Petrykivka

There are no historical records of Petrykivka painting prior to the beginning of the 20th century, and therefore the names of early artists have not been recorded. Largely thanks to the work of Dmytro Yavornytsky, the names of Petrykivka masters of the early 20th century (born in the 1880s and 1890s) were recorded, such as Tatiana Pata, Nadia Bilokin', Yaryna Pylypenko, and Paraska Pavlenko. These artists are the only ones of their generation whose works are known and are preserved in museums with attribution.

In addition, there are a few known artists born in 1908-1919 who learned the tradition in their families (particularly in the families of the above-mentioned Paraska Pavlenko and Yaryna Pylypenko), but who developed creatively under the strong influence of Tatiana Pata. These include Hanna Isaieva (née Pylypenko), Nadia Tymoshenko, Vasyl' Vovk, Vera Pavlenko, and Halyna Pavlenko (later Pavlenko-Chernychenko).

All of the other famous artists of this generation were students of Tatiana Pata and studied at the Petrykivka Art School between 1936 and 1941. These include: Fedir Panko, Vasyl' Sokolenko, Marfa Tymchenko, Vira Klymenko (later Klymenko-Zhukova) Pelahia Hlushchenko, Yavdokha (Evdokia) Kliupa, Maria Shyshat'ska, Oleksandra Pikush, Ivan Zavhorodniy, Halyna Prudnikova (Zavhorodnia), Nadia Shulyk, Zoia Kudish, Vekla Kucherenko (Pata), Hanna Danyleiko, Nadia Pikush, and others.

Distinctive among the masters of the Petrykivka style is Anna Samara, who was the only known member of the older generation of painters that was not born and trained in Petrykivka village. She mastered the style and technique in Kyiv under the indirect influence of Petrykivka masters such as Marfa Tymchenko, and continued to develop her skills at the Kyiv Taras Shevchenko Souvenir Factory.

The vast majority of the next generation studied Petrykivka painting under Fedir Panko and/or Vasyl' Sokolenko, as well as in some cases with one of the other master artists mentioned above. These include: Volodymyr Hlushchenko, Nina Turchyn (Shyshats'ka), Tamara Kudish, Nina Shulyk, Vira Tezyk, Anatolii Chernus'kyi, Nina Chernus'ka, Andrii Pikush, Maria Pikush, Uliana Skliar, Valentyna Panko, Valentyna Deka (Statyva), Lidia Bulavin (Statyva), Maria Yanenko (Statyva), Natalia Statyva-Zharko, Halyna Nazarenko, Tatiana Har'kava (Lapshyn), Liudmyla Horbulia, Olena Zinchuk, Yulia Nahai, Yaryna Nazarenko, Serhii Dreshpak, Valentyna Khomenko, Nina Borodina, Kateryna Tymoshenko, Tamara Teslenko, Natalia Kaliuha, Maria Kurin'ka (Bel'mas), Iryna Kibets', Olena Yarmoliuk, Olena Skytsiuk (daughter of Marfa Tymchenko), and others.

Additional significant artists of this generation include Valentyna Karpets'-Yermolaieva, Valentyna Milenko, Natalia Rybak, Liana Skliar, Tatiana Pata (Skliar), Tamara Vakulenko (Samars'ka), Oleksandr Vakulenko, Viktoriya Tymoshenko, Mykola Deka, Svitlana Bilenko, Natalia Maliarchuk, Volodymyr Padun, and others.

Among the most active contemporary Petrykivka-style artists are Halyna Nazarenko, Valentyna Panko, Viktoria Tymoshenko, Natalia Statyva-Zharko, Olena Yarmoliuk, and Natalia Maliarchuk.

Petrikivka painting has often been a family craft, and many well-known Petrykivka artists (both historical and contemporary) often have well-known artists in their immediate family. Among the more famous of these "dynasties" are those of Panko, Pikush, Statyva, and Skliar. In some cases, these links are not obvious, as the carriers of the tradition were often women who changed their surname after marriage. It is also complicated by the fact that some relatively unusual surnames happen to be quite common in Petrykivka, and two artists with the same name may in fact not be close relatives.

== Gallery ==
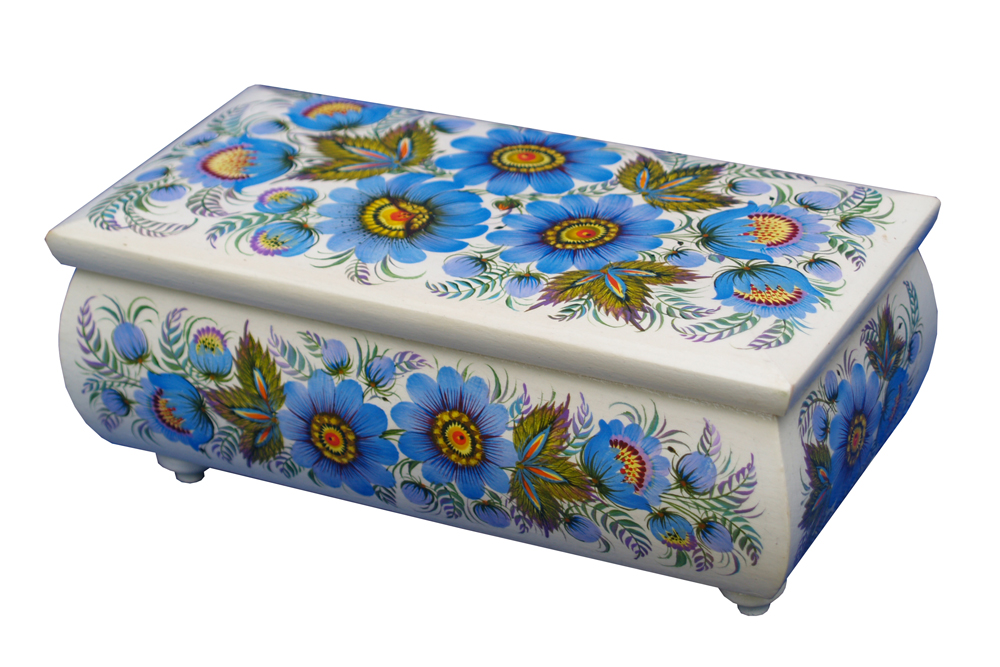
Decorative box "Blue Flowers" by Natalia Statyva-Zharko

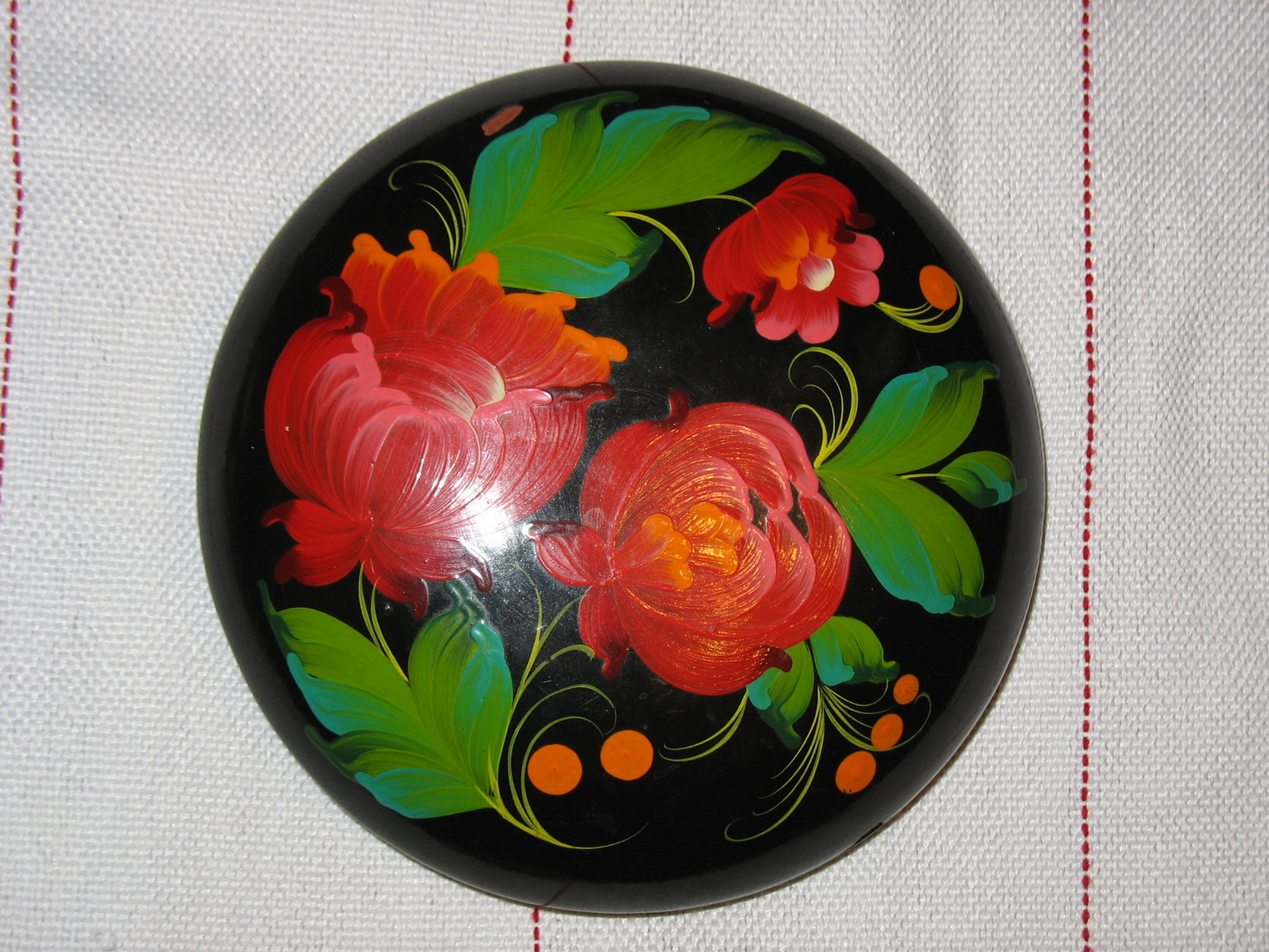

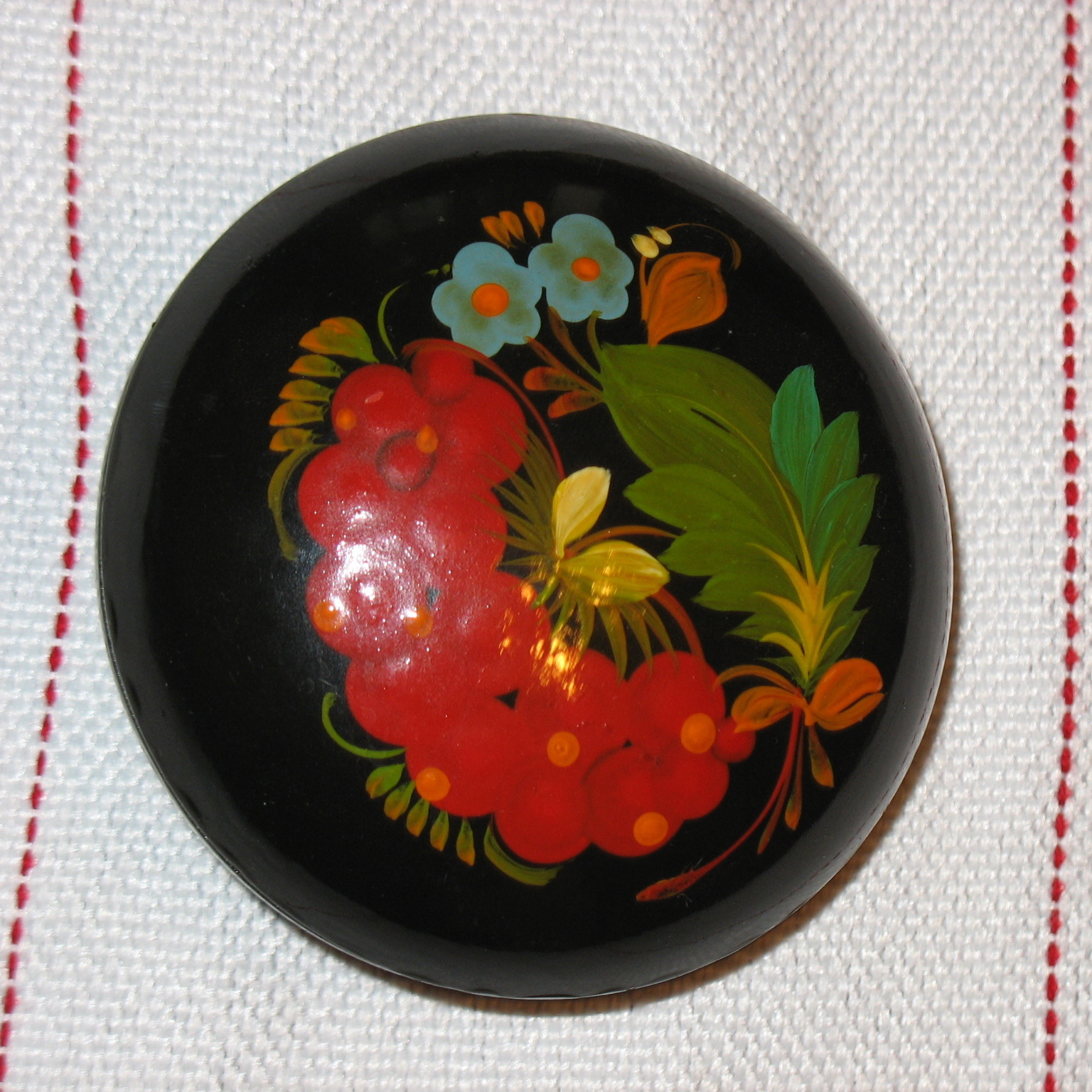

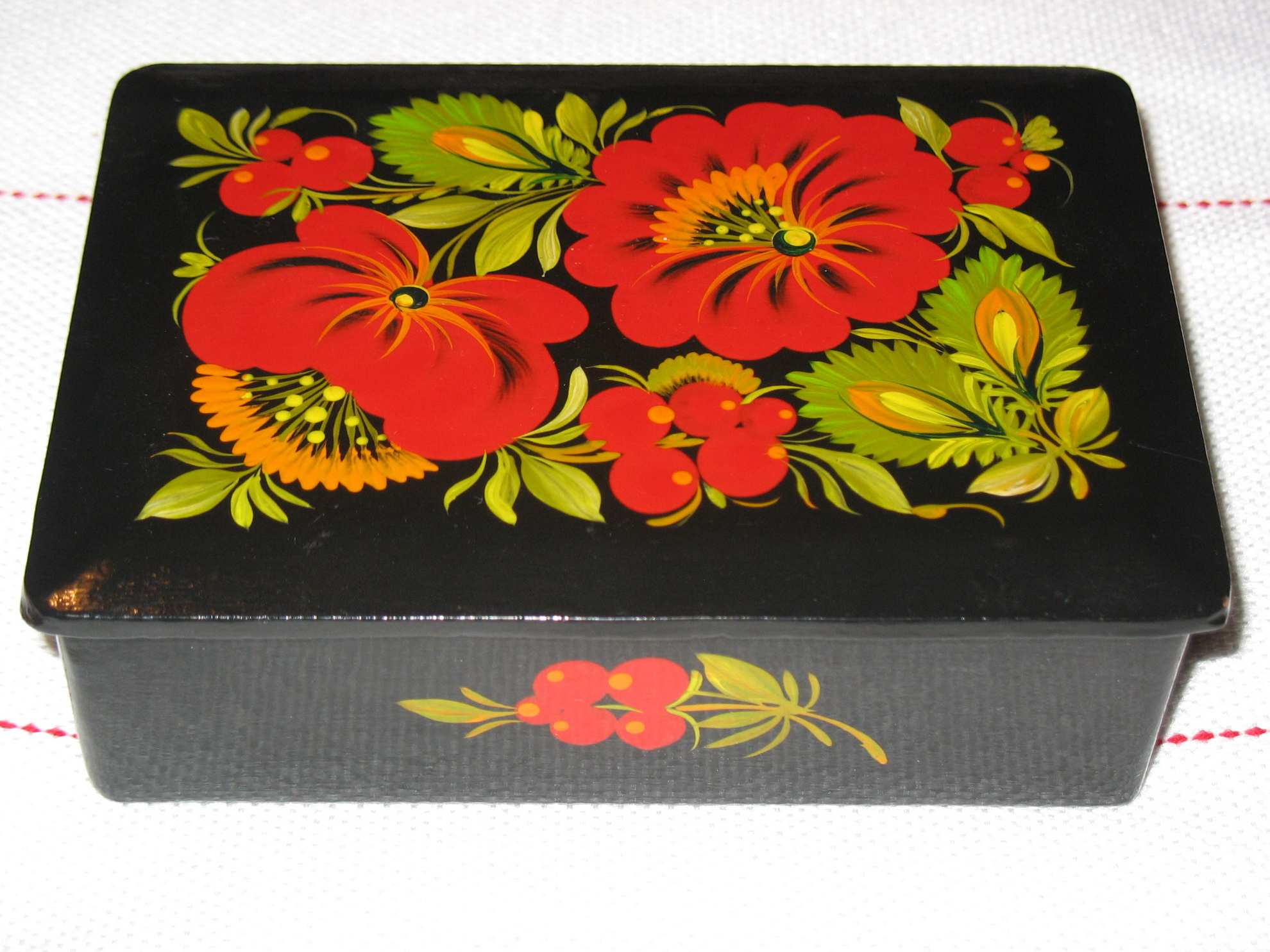

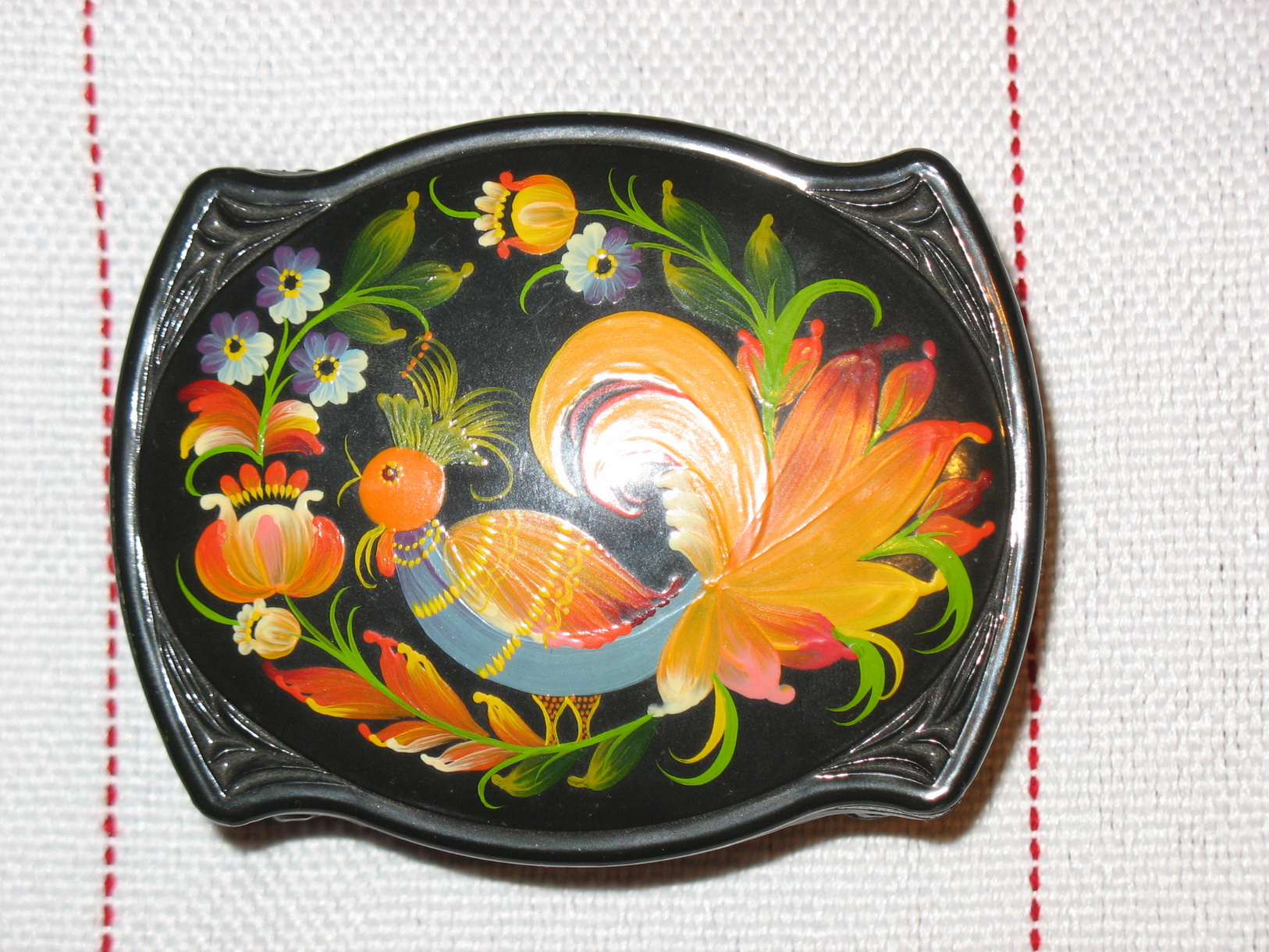
