= Joel B. Smith =

Joel B. Smith is an expert in climate change policy.

He served as a coordinating lead author for the Intergovernmental Panel on Climate Change 2001 assessment report and as a lead author for the 2007 assessment report. The work of the IPCC, including the contributions of many scientists, was recognised with the joint award of the 2007 Nobel Peace Prize.

Currently, he is a Principal at Stratus Consulting Inc., in Boulder, Colorado.

== See also ==
- Climate Change
- Global Warming
