= Merrik Ward =

English cricketer

Personal information
- Full name: Merrik de Sampajo Cecil Ward
- Born: 15 July 1908; Belgravia, London, England
- Died: 13 February 1981 (aged 72); Bath, Somerset, England
- Batting: Left-handed
- Bowling: Left-arm medium Slow left-arm orthodox

Domestic team information
- Years: Team
- 1927–1929: Hampshire

Career statistics
Competition	First-class
Matches	5
Runs scored	141
Batting average	15.66
100s/50s	–/–
Top score	48
Balls bowled	234
Wickets	0
Bowling average	–
5 wickets in innings	–
10 wickets in match	–
Best bowling	–
Catches/stumpings	–/–
- Source: Cricinfo, 9 January 2010

Merrik de Sampajo Cecil Ward (5 July 1908 – 13 February 1981) was an English first-class cricketer.

Ward was born at Belgravia in July 1908. He was educated at Eton College, where he played for the college cricket team. He made his debut in first-class cricket for Hampshire against Gloucestershire at Cheltenham in the 1927 County Championship. He played first-class cricket for Hampshire until 1929, making five appearances. In his five matches, Ward scored 141 runs at an average of 15.66, with a highest score of 48. As a left-arm bowler who could bowl both medium pace and slow orthodox, he bowled a total of 39 overs without taking a wicket. He stood in as captain for The Hon. Lionel Tennyson in a match against Kent in 1928, the same match in which he made his highest first-class score.

Ward later served in the Second World War, being commissioned into the Royal Army Ordnance Corps as a second lieutenant in January 1941. He died at Bath in February 1981.
