= Bill Sadler (cricketer) =

English cricketer

William Cecil Holborn Sadler (24 September 1896 – 12 February 1981) was an English first-class cricketer active 1920–29 who played for Surrey. He was born in King's Cross; died in Wandsworth.
