= Suzanne Guité =

Canadian artist (1926–1981)

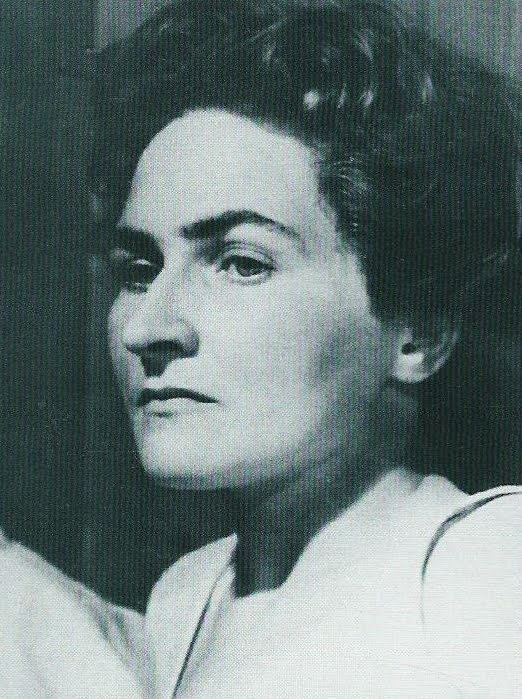
- Born: 1926; New Richmond
- Died: February 6, 1981 (aged 54–55); Mexico
- Known for: artist
- Spouse: Alberto Tommi

Suzanne Guité RCA (1926 – February 6, 1981) was a Canadian artist who lived in Percé, Quebec.

== Early life ==
She was born in New Richmond and studied sculpture at the Institute of Design in Chicago with László Moholy-Nagy and Alexander Archipenko, continuing her education with Constantin Brâncuși. Guité pursued further studies at the Accademia di Belle Arti di Firenze and research at the Instituto Politécnico Nacional in Mexico. She also studied archaeology and art history in Crete and Rhodes. In 1956, with her husband, painter Alberto Tommi, she founded the Centre d'art de Percé. Guité was invited to the Venice Biennale of 1958. In 1975, she was elected into the Royal Canadian Academy of Arts.

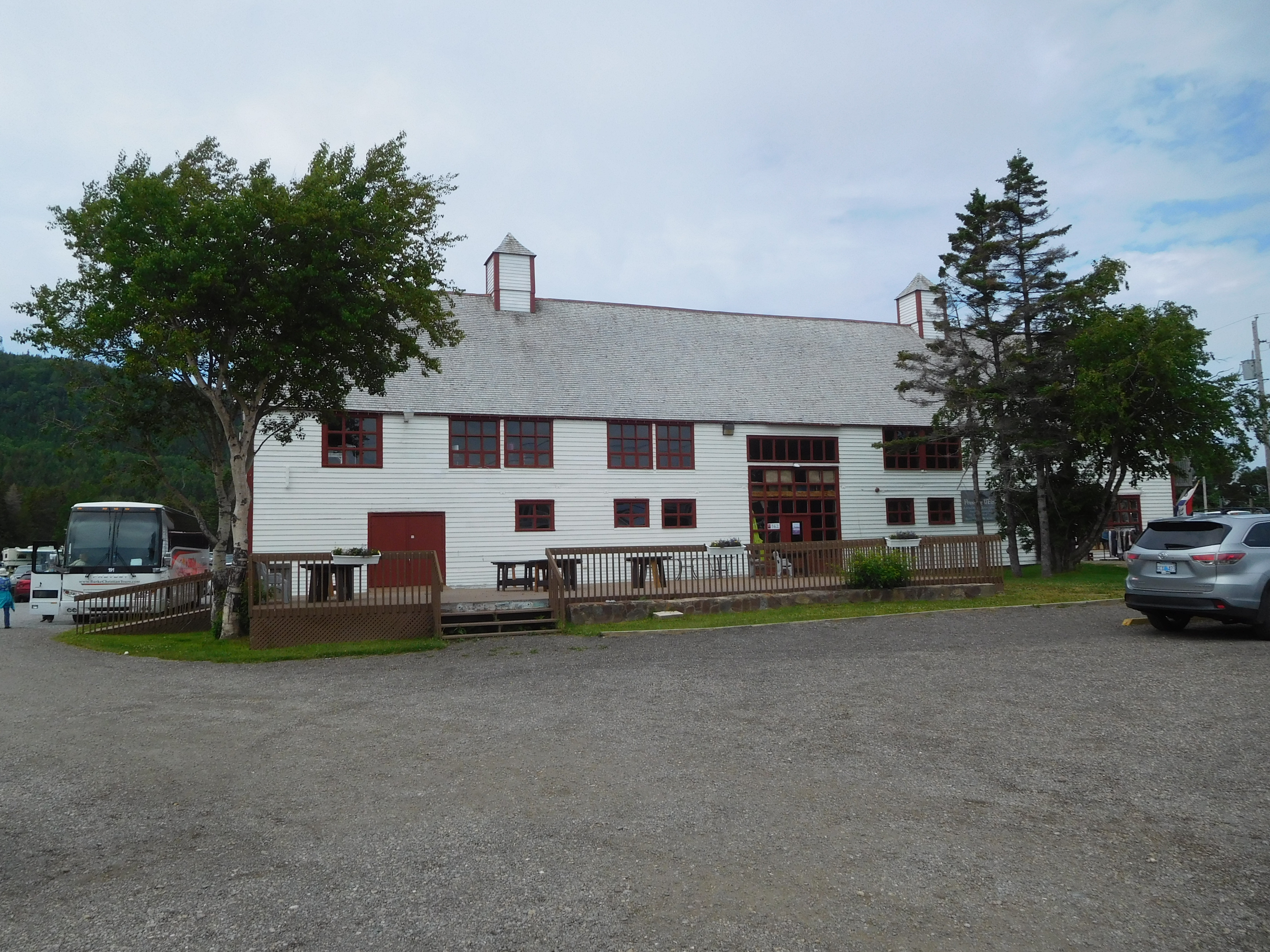
Centre d'art de Percé

== Career ==
Best known as a sculptor, from 1956 to 1960, she painted murals; she also created paintings and tapestries. Guité created a large sculpture called Maternité aux jumeaux for Expo 67. As a sculptor, she believed in listening to her materials and carefully selected the wood and stone used in her works. In her work, she explored universal themes relating to humanity's interaction with the universe and was influenced by the art created by ancient civilizations, especially pre-Columbian art.

Her work appeared in exhibitions held at the Musée d'art contemporain de Montréal and the Musée Rodin in Paris. Guité's art is included in private, corporate and public collections, including the National Gallery of Canada and the Musée national des beaux-arts du Québec.

== Death and recognition ==
She was murdered by her second life partner, who was from Jamaica, during a stay in Mexico.

Guité's life was chronicled in "S. Guité La force tranquille", an episode in the documentary series Histoires oubliées.

The Espace culturel Suzanne-Guité and Place Suzanne-Guité in New Richmond were named in her honour.
