= Frederic Fox =

White House official (1917–1981)

- Born: Frederic Ewing Fox; August 19, 1917; Stamford, Connecticut, U.S.
- Died: February 20, 1981 (aged 63); Princeton, New Jersey, U.S.
- Education: Princeton University (BA, 1939); Union Theological Seminary (BD, 1948)
- Occupations: Clergyman; university administrator; government official
- Known for: Special Assistant to Dwight D. Eisenhower; Keeper of Princetoniana
- Spouse: Hannah Sharp
- Children: 5

Frederic Ewing Fox (August 19, 1917 – February 20, 1981) is known as the only man to hold the title “Keeper of Princetoniana" at Princeton University, and also served as a Special Assistant in the White House, and as Staff Assistant to President Dwight D. Eisenhower.

He was born in Stamford, Connecticut, attended schools in Scarsdale, New York and Asheville, North Carolina, and received his degree from Princeton University He enlisted in the Army in 1942. Although he enlisted as a private, he was selected for Officer Candidate School, and was commissioned as a 2LT.

He was assigned to what later became known as the Ghost Army in January 1944 as part of the 23rd HQ Company. A few days after one of the earliest European deceptions, Lt. Fox wrote a memo that eventually went out to the men under the name of Col. Harry L. Reeder, the unit's commander. It read, in part: "The attitude of the Twenty-third HQs towards their mission is too much MILITARY and not enough SHOWMANSHIP. Like it or not, the 23rd HQ must consider itself a traveling road show. . . . The presentations . . . will include the proper scenery, props, costumes, principals, extras, dialogue, and sound effects." Fred's son, Donald Fox, said much later that "if he hadn't done the Triangle Show at Princeton, he wouldn't have been the actor he was in the Army."

After being honorably discharged he attended the Union Theological Seminary and Defiance College. He went on to become pastor of four Congregational Churches in Arizona, New York, Ohio and Massachusetts.

He was brought to the attention of President Eisenhower through his articles in The New York Times on American community life. In 1956 he became a Special Assistant in the White House; and from 1957 to January 1961 he served as Staff Assistant to the President. In 1964 he became the Recording Secretary at Princeton University and served in that position until 1981.
