= Joe Smith (comedian) =

American comedian

Joe Smith (February 16, 1884 – February 22, 1981) was a vaudeville comedian with Charles Dale (1881–1971) as the act Smith & Dale.

== Biography ==
He was born as Joseph Sultzer on February 16, 1884, in Manhattan, New York City. He partnered with Charles Dale in 1898 after they had met colliding in a bicycling accident. One of their first performances was with Will Lester's Imperial Vaudeville & Comedy Company in 1901. Smith and Dale headlined the first all-American variety bill to tour Europe in 1909. They later went to Hollywood, where they made films for Warner Brothers, 20th Century Fox, and Paramount Pictures starting in 1929.

In 1972 Neil Simon produced The Sunshine Boys, based on the lives of Smith and Dale.

He died on February 22, 1981, at the Lillian Booth Actors Home in Englewood, New Jersey.
