= Delta Upsilon Fraternity House =

Delta Upsilon Fraternity House may refer to:

- Delta Upsilon Fraternity House (Ann Arbor, Michigan)
- Delta Upsilon Fraternity House (Champaign, Illinois)
- Delta Upsilon Chapter House (Ames, Iowa)
