= Alpha Tau Omega Fraternity House =

Alpha Tau Omega Fraternity House may refer to:

- Alpha Tau Omega Fraternity House (West Lafayette, Indiana)
- Alpha Tau Omega Fraternity House (Reno, Nevada)
- Alpha Tau Omega Fraternity House (Old), Eugene, Oregon
