= Beta Theta Pi Fraternity House =

Beta Theta Pi Fraternity House may refer to:

(In the United States by state)

- Beta Theta Pi Fraternity House (Champaign, Illinois), listed on the National Register of Historic Places in Champaign County, Illinois
- Beta Theta Pi Fraternity House (Chapel Hill, North Carolina), listed on the National Register of Historic Places in Orange County, North Carolina
- Beta Theta Pi Fraternity House, The University of Oklahoma, Norman, Oklahoma, listed on the National Register of Historic Places in Cleveland County, Oklahoma
- Old Beta Theta Pi Fraternity House, Eugene, Oregon, listed on the National Register of Historic Places in Oregon
