= Alpha Delta Phi Society fraternity =

Alpha Delta Phi Society Fraternity can refer to:

- Alpha Delta Phi, an all-male collegiate fraternity, historically referred to as the Alpha Delta Phi Society
- Alpha Delta Phi Society, a gender-inclusive collegiate fraternity, an outgrowth of the men's fraternity
- Alpha Delta Phi Fraternity House (Champaign, Illinois), a chapter house of Alpha Delta Phi fraternity
