= Phi Delta Theta Fraternity House =

Phi Delta Theta Fraternity House may refer to:

- Phi Delta Theta Fraternity House (Champaign, Illinois)
- Phi Delta Theta Fraternity House (Lincoln, Nebraska)

== See also ==
- Phi Delta Theta
