= Sigma Alpha Epsilon Fraternity House =

Sigma Alpha Epsilon Fraternity House may refer to:

- Sigma Alpha Epsilon Fraternity House (Champaign, Illinois)
- Sigma Alpha Epsilon Fraternity House (Columbia, Missouri)
- Sigma Alpha Epsilon Fraternity House (Moscow, Idaho)

== See also ==
- Sigma Alpha Epsilon
