= North American fraternity and sorority housing =

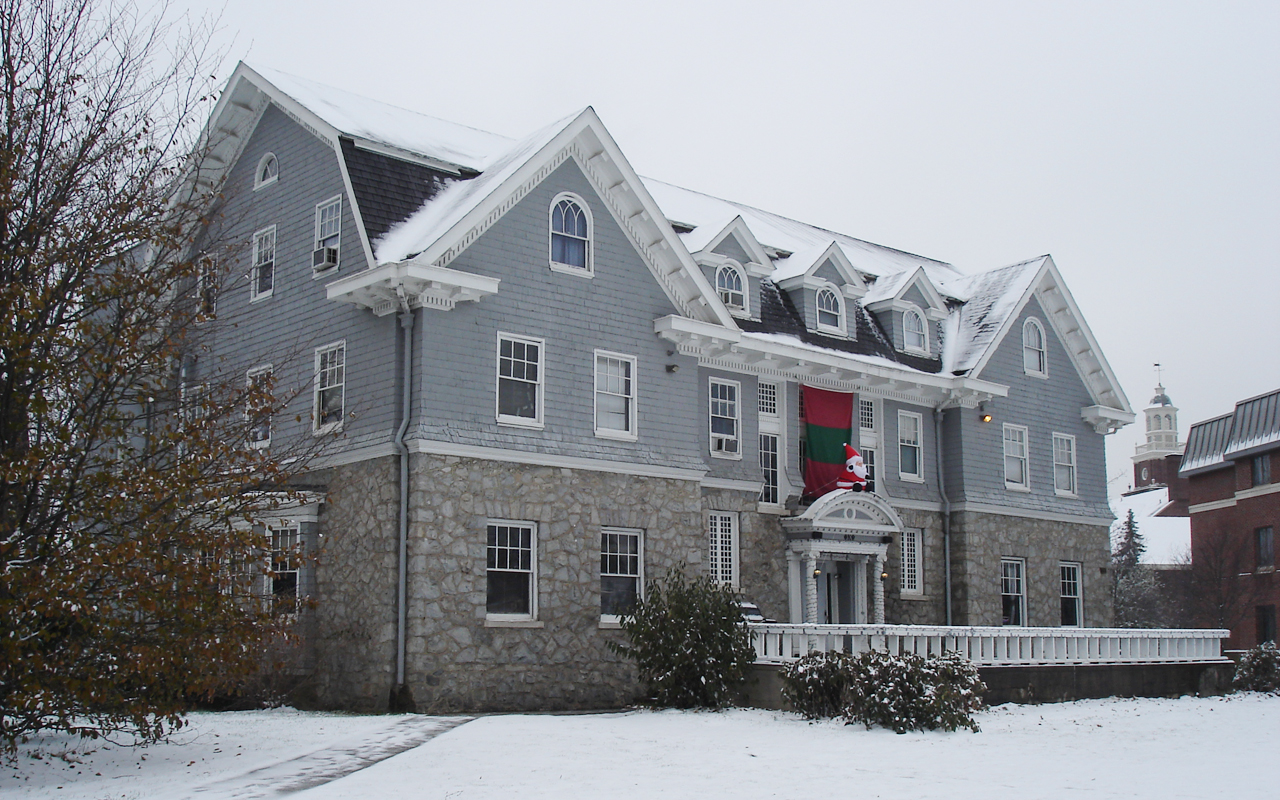
Phi Kappa Psi fraternity house at Lafayette College in Easton, Pennsylvania

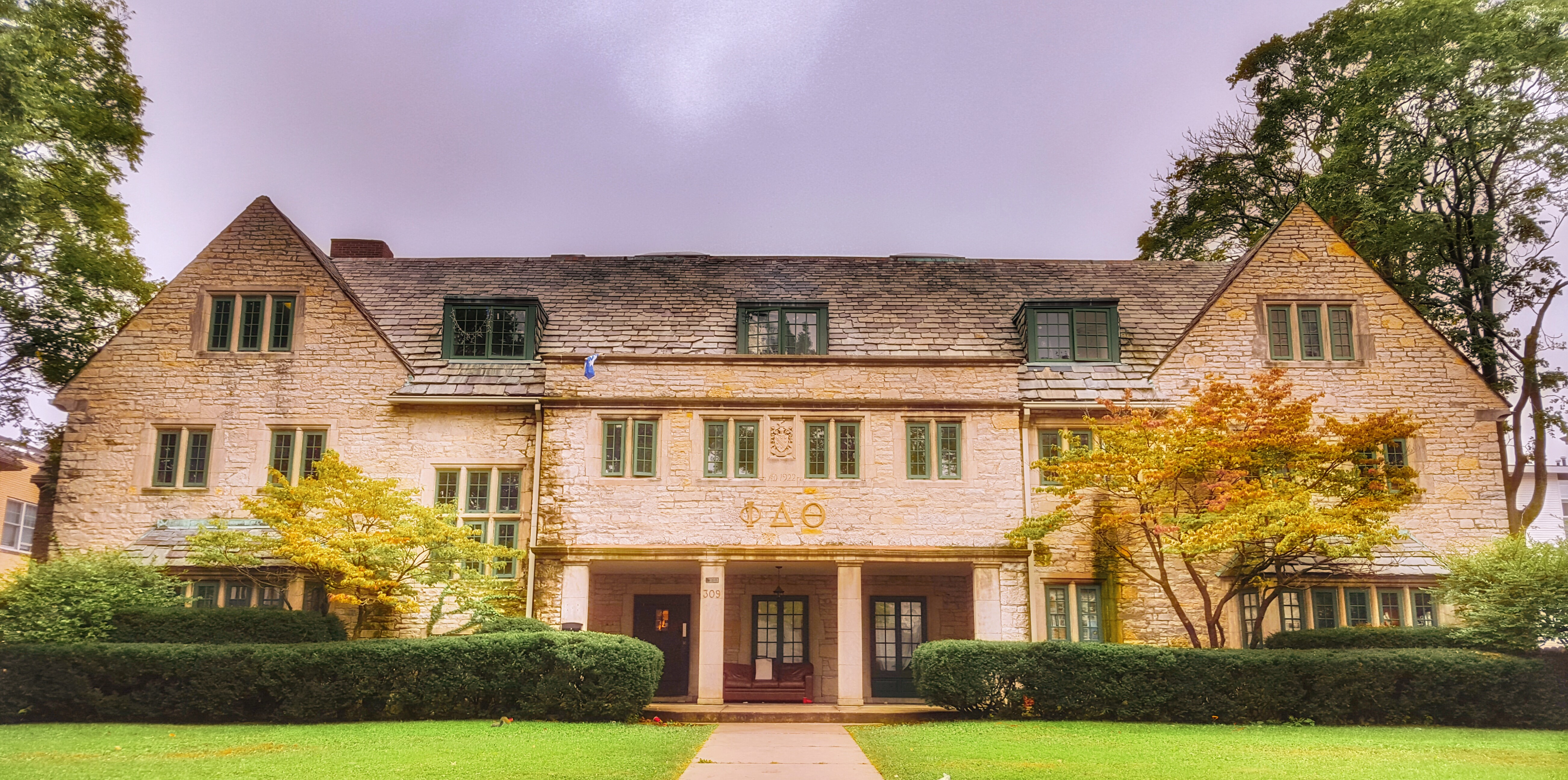
Phi Delta Theta house at University of Illinois in Urbana, Illinois

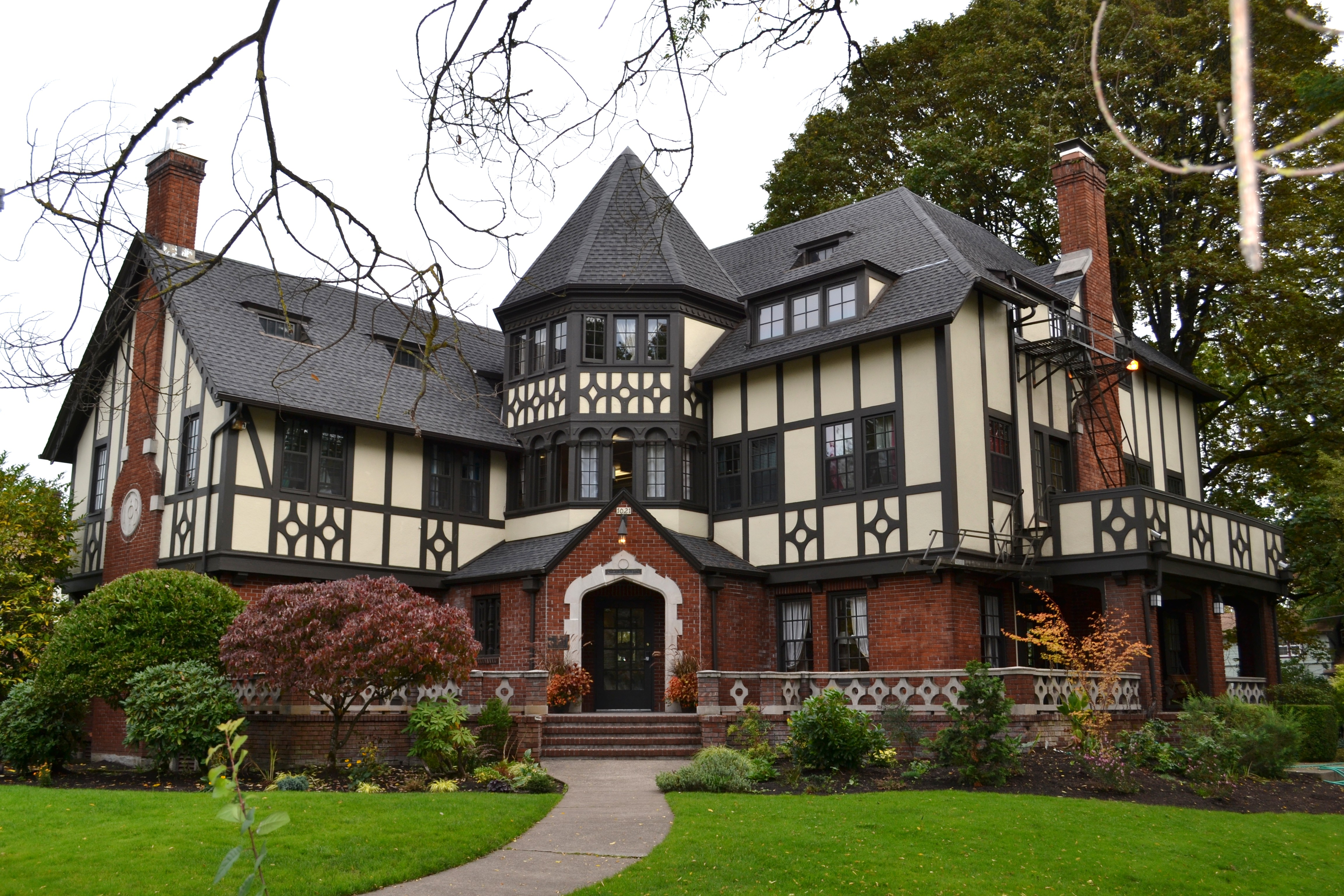
Gamma Phi Beta house at the University of Oregon in Eugene, Oregon

North American fraternity and sorority housing refers largely to the houses or housing areas in which fraternity and sorority members live and work together. In addition to serving as housing, fraternity and sorority housing may also serve to host social gatherings, meetings, and functions that benefit the community.

== History ==
The first fraternity house seems to have been located at Alpha Epsilon of Chi Psi at the University of Michigan around 1846. As fraternity membership was punishable by expulsion at many colleges at this time, the house, "an abandoned log hut" was located deep in the woods.

Fraternity chapter housing initially existed in two forms: lodges that served as meeting rooms and houses that had boarding rooms. The lodges came first and were largely replaced by houses with living accommodations. Lodges were often no more than rented rooms above stores or taverns. The idea of substantial fraternity housing caught on quickly, but was accomplished with much greater ease in the North as southern college students had far less available money for construction.

The first fraternity house in the South was likely one rented by members of Beta Theta Pi at Hampden–Sydney College from at least 1856. Alpha Tau Omega was then the first fraternity to own a house in the South when, in 1880, its chapter at The University of the South acquired one.

Early chapters of women's fraternities often rented houses where they could live together, usually with a chaperone. This was in a day before colleges and universities had housing available. The first chapter house built by a women's fraternity was the one Alpha Phi erected at Syracuse University in 1886.

Many colleges eventually came to support fraternity and sorority housing as they allowed increased enrollment without the construction of costly dormitories. The nature of this benefit varied between campuses as some houses were paid for entirely by alumni, some were rented, and some were built on land leased from the college. It was further recognized that, while fraternities having chapter houses did not raise academic performance, it did tend to keep it from falling as the chapters could not afford (financially) to have members leaving school and no longer paying for their rooms.

The Inter-Sorority Congress of 1913 saw the establishment of uniform rules and regulations regarding life in chapter houses. The number of houses owned by fraternities and sororities grew from 772 in 1915 to 928 in 1920.

== Design ==
Fraternity and sorority houses vary greatly in size and aesthetics. They can usually be identified by large Greek letters or flags on the front of the house. Larger chapter houses generally have a large meeting room, a large dining room, a commercial kitchen, and a study room. There is usually a lounge of some sort, access to which is often restricted to fully initiated members. Fraternities and sororities will also often maintain a chapter room, to which only initiates may ever be admitted and even whose existence may be kept secret. The walls of the house may be decorated with pictures of past chapter events, awards, and trophies, decorative (or historic) paddles, or composite photos of members from past years.

In some fraternities or sororities, only some members live in the house while in others the entire fraternity or sorority may live in the house. Other, larger fraternities or sororities may have more than one house to accommodate all of its members.

At many colleges, Greek houses are placed on the same street which is traditionally referred to as "Greek Row."

== Policies ==
Fraternity and sorority houses are typically owned either by a corporation of alumni, the sponsoring national organization, or the host college. For this reason, such houses may be subject to the rules of the host college, the national organization, or both.

Due to the increase in widely publicized alcohol-related deaths on college campuses, many national organizations and host colleges have implemented dry housing policies in which the consumption and possession of alcohol are prohibited on house property. Some colleges make this policy conditional on overall grade performance.

In addition to banning alcohol, many university-owned fraternity and sorority houses have smoking bans in place inside. Because of residential requirements, some college campuses and national chapter administrations also prohibit members of the opposite sex on certain floors of fraternity and sorority houses.

Founded in 2017, the Fraternal Housing Association is a national membership that supports the unique challenges of managing fraternity and sorority housing.

== National Register chapter houses ==
The following fraternity and sorority chapter houses are listed on the National Register of Historic Places. Demolished structures are indicated in italics.

Name	Organization	Architect	Institution	Location	Year completed	Ref.
Alpha Delta Phi Fraternity House	Alpha Delta Phi	Ralph W. Varney	University of Illinois at Urbana–Champaign	Champaign, Illinois	1925	(Note: The chapter house was demolished in January 2018.)
Alpha House	Alpha Phi Alpha			Detroit, Michigan	1912	(Note: Alpha House was a private residence until purchased by the fraternity in 1939,)
Alpha Phi Fraternity House-Beta Alpha Chapter	Alpha Phi	Charles Harris (1937 remodel)	University of Illinois at Urbana–Champaign	Champaign, Illinois	1909	(Note: House was a private residence until acquired by the fraternity in 1923.)
Alpha Rho Chi Fraternity House	Alpha Rho Chi	Royer, Danley, and Smith	University of Illinois at Urbana–Champaign	Champaign, Illinois	1928	
Alpha Tau Omega Fraternity House	Alpha Tau Omega	Lehman "Monk" Ferris	University of Nevada	Reno, Nevada	1929	
Alpha Tau Omega Fraternity House (Maltese Manor)	Alpha Tau Omega		Purdue University	West Lafayette, Indiana	1920	(Note: It housed the Indiana Gamma Omicron chapter of Alpha Tau Omega until May 2021,)
Beta Theta Pi Fraternity House	Beta Theta Pi	Frederick J. Klein	University of Illinois at Urbana–Champaign	Champaign, Illinois	1912	(Note: The chapter used the house until 2017 and disbanded in 2018. Its chapter house was demolished in 2020.)
Beta Theta Pi Fraternity House	Beta Theta Pi		University of North Carolina at Chapel Hill	Chapel Hill, North Carolina	1929	
Harold C. Bradley House	Sigma Phi Society	Louis H. Sullivan and George Grant Elmslie	University of Wisconsin–Madison	Madison, Wisconsin,	1909	(Note: House was a private residence until acquired by the society in 1915.)
Chi Omega Chapter House	Chi Omega	Charles L. Ellis	University of Arkansas	Fayetteville, Arkansas	1927	
Chi Psi Fraternity House	Chi Psi	Richard Sundeleaf	University of Oregon	Eugene, Oregon	1935	
Colonials Club House	Colonial Club, Theta Delta Chi,	Proudfoot & Bird; Woodburn & O'Neil	Iowa State University	Ames, Iowa	1910	
Deke House	Delta Kappa Epsilon	William Henry Miller	Cornell University	Ithaca, New York	1893	
Delta Kappa Epsilon Fraternity House	Delta Kappa Epsilon	E. G. Oldefest	University of Illinois at Urbana–Champaign	Champaign, Illinois	1906	
Delta Kappa Epsilon Fraternity House	Delta Kappa Epsilon	Robert Frost Daggett	DePauw University	Greencastle, Indiana	1926	
Delta Psi, Alpha Chapter building	St. Anthony Hall	Henry Hornbostel and George Carnegie Palmer	Columbia University	Manhattan, New York City, New York	1898	
Delta Tau Delta Founders House	Delta Tau Delta		Bethany College	Bethany, West Virginia	1858	(Note: One of the co-founders, Jacob S. Lowe lived in a room at the house from 1858 to 1859, and that is where the fraternity was founded and the constitution and bylaws were created but it di not continue to serve as a fraternity house.)
Delta Upsilon Chapter House	Delta Upsilon	Alexander M. Linn	Iowa State University	Ames, Iowa	1930	
Delta Upsilon Fraternity House	Delta Upsilon	Albert Kahn	University of Michigan	Ann Arbor, Michigan	1903	
Delta Upsilon Fraternity House	Delta Upsilon	Leonard Steube	University of Illinois at Urbana–Champaign	Champaign, Illinois	1927	
Dr. William Gifford House	Tau Kappa Epsilon	William W. Sabin	Cleveland State University	Cleveland, Ohio	c. 1901	(Note: After serving as a residence, the Mary E. Ingersoll Girls Friendly Club, a clubhouse operated by the Woman's Christian Temperance Union, and a settlement house, Gifford House became a fraternity residence in 1960.)
Hancock House	Alpha Phi Alpha	M. H. Pettigo	Bluefield State University	Bluefield, West Virginia	1907	(Note: Hancock House was purchased by the fraternity in 1962.)
Iowa Beta Chapter of Sigma Phi Epsilon	Sigma Phi Epsilon	Amos B. Emery	Iowa State University	Ames, Iowa	1931	
Kappa Delta Rho Fraternity House	Kappa Delta Rho		University of Illinois at Urbana–Champaign	Champaign, Illinois	1928	
Kappa Sigma Fraternity House	Kappa Sigma	Archie H. Hubbard	University of Illinois at Urbana–Champaign	Champaign, Illinois	1911	
Kappa Sigma Fraternity, Gamma Theta Chapter	Kappa Sigma		University of Idaho	Moscow, Idaho	1916	
Llenroc	Delta Phi	Nichols & Brown	Cornell University	Ithaca, New York	1865; 1911	(Note: Llenroc was built for Ezra Cornell, the founder of Cornell University. It became the chapter house of Delta Phi fraternity in 1911.)
Old Alpha Tau Omega Fraternity House	Alpha Tau Omega	George Lill	University of Oregon	Eugene, Oregon	1910	(Note: The fraternity used this building from 1910 to 1922.)
Old Beta Theta Pi Fraternity House	Beta Theta Pi, Delta Zeta		University of Oregon	Eugene, Oregon	1906	
Omega Chapter of the Chi Phi Fraternity	Chi Phi		Georgia Tech	Atlanta, Georgia	1929	
Parish Apartments	Sigma Pi, Xi Psi Phi, Xi Psi Phi	Myron Edwards Pugh	University of Iowa	Iowa City, Iowa	1929	(Note: This building was built for Sigma Pi and was used by fraternities until 1943.)
Phi Delta Theta Fraternity House	Phi Delta Theta	Howard Van Doren Shaw	University of Illinois at Urbana–Champaign	Champaign, Illinois	1922	
Phi Delta Theta Fraternity House	Phi Delta Theta	Martin I. Aitken	University of Nebraska–Lincoln	Lincoln, Nebraska	1937	
Phi Gamma Delta Fraternity House	Phi Gamma Delta	Carl Stravs and Madsen Brothers	University of Minnesota	Minneapolis, Minnesota	1912	
Phi Gamma Delta House	Phi Gamma Delta	Crowell & Lancaster	University of Maine	Orono, Maine	1925	
Pi Chapter House of Psi Upsilon Fraternity	Psi Upsilon	Wellington W. Taber	Syracuse University	Syracuse, New York	1898	
Porcellian Club	Porcellian Club	William York Peters	Harvard University	Cambridge, Massachusetts	c. 1881	
Saint Anthony Hall	St. Anthony Hall	J. Cleaveland Cady.	Trinity College	Hartford, Connecticut	1878	
St. Anthony Hall House	St. Anthony Hall	Cope and Stewardson	University of Pennsylvania	Philadelphia, Pennsylvania	1907	
Sigma Alpha Epsilon Chapter House	Sigma Alpha Epsilon	Russell S. Potter	Miami University	Oxford, Ohio	1938	
Sigma Alpha Epsilon Fraternity House	Sigma Alpha Epsilon	George Dean and Albert Dean	University of Illinois at Urbana–Champaign	Champaign, Illinois	1907	
Sigma Alpha Epsilon Fraternity House	Sigma Alpha Epsilon	Fred Wallace; Marshall and Brown	University of Missouri	Columbia, Missouri	1908	
Sigma Alpha Epsilon Fraternity House	Sigma Alpha Epsilon	Charles I. Carpenter	University of Idaho	Moscow, Idaho	1932	
Sigma Sigma–Delta Chi Fraternity House	Sigma Sigma, Delta Chi, Triangle Fraternity		Iowa State University	Ames, Iowa	1924	(Note: The frtaternity sold the house in 2006.)
Theta Xi Fraternity Chapter House	Theta Xi	Joseph M. Lawlor	Rensselaer Polytechnic Institute	Troy, New York	1931	
Thorsen House	Sigma Phi Society	Greene & Greene	University of California, Berkeley	Berkeley, California	1909	(Note: This was built as the residence of lumber tycoon William Thorsen until his death in 1942. At that time, it became a fraternity house.)
Welch Hall	Sigma Alpha Epsilon, Alpha Sigma Phi	David Frederick Wallace (1929 renovation)	University of Missouri	Columbia, Missouri	1820, 1907	(Note: Oak Hill was a residence, hospital, hotel, and school before becoming a fraternity house in 1929.)
Xi Chapter, Psi Upsilon Fraternity	Psi Upsilon	Colin C. Wilson	Wesleyan University	Middletown, Connecticut	1891	
Zeta Psi Fraternity House at Lafayette College	Zeta Psi	James Barnes Baker and William Marsh Micler	Lafayette College	Easton, Pennsylvania	1910	

== Notable chapter houses by size ==
Rank	Size	Organization	Institution	Location	Year completed	Ref.
1	55,500 sq ft (5,160 m^{2})	Phi Gamma Delta	Indiana University	Bloomington, Indiana	2016	
2	55,000 sq ft (5,100 m^{2})	Pi Kappa Alpha	Florida State University	Tallahassee, Florida	2005	
3	46,356 sq ft (4,306.6 m^{2})	Kappa Kappa Gamma	University of Arkansas	Fayetteville, Arkansas	2013	
4	43,000 sq ft (4,000 m^{2})	Delta Delta Delta	University of Arkansas	Fayetteville, Arkansas	2019	
5	42,000 sq ft (3,900 m^{2})	Pi Beta Phi	University of Arkansas	Fayetteville, Arkansas	2016	
6	40,352 sq ft (3,748.8 m^{2})	Delta Chi	Florida State University	Tallahassee, Florida	2005	
7 (tie)	40,000 sq ft (3,700 m^{2})	Kappa Delta	University of Arkansas	Fayetteville, Arkansas	2019	
7 (tie)	40,000 sq ft (3,700 m^{2})	Alpha Chi Omega	University of Alabama	Tuscaloosa, Alabama	2014	
7 (tie)	40,000 sq ft (3,700 m^{2})	Delta Upsilon	University of Missouri	Columbia, Missouri	2015	
7 (tie)	40,000 sq ft (3,700 m^{2})	Gamma Phi Beta	University of Alabama	Tuscaloosa, Alabama	2015	
11	39,444 sq ft (3,664.5 m^{2})	Phi Mu	University of Alabama	Tuscaloosa, Alabama	2016	
12	39,264 sq ft (3,647.7 m^{2})	Lambda Chi Alpha	Florida State University	Tallahassee, Florida	2005	
13	38,853 sq ft (3,609.6 m^{2})	FarmHouse	Oklahoma State University	Stillwater, Oklahoma	2012	
14	38,000 sq ft (3,500 m^{2})	Pi Kappa Alpha	Oklahoma State University	Stillwater, Oklahoma	2017	
15	36,884 sq ft (3,426.6 m^{2})	Delta Tau Delta	Indiana University	Bloomington, IN	2016	
16	36,818 sq ft (3,420.5 m^{2})	Alpha Gamma Rho	Oklahoma State University	Stillwater, Oklahoma	2015	
17 (tie)	36,000 sq ft (3,344.5 m^{2})	Alpha Chi Omega	University of Oklahoma	Norman, Oklahoma	2023	
17 (tie)	36,000 sq ft (3,344.5 m^{2})	Beta Theta Pi	University of Oklahoma	Norman, Oklahoma	2015	
19	35,000 sq ft (3,300 m^{2})	Phi Kappa Psi	University of Kansas	Lawrence, Kansas	2005	
20	34,800 sq ft (3,230 m^{2})	Delta Gamma	University of Alabama	Tuscaloosa, Alabama	2012	
21	34,000 sq ft (3,200 m^{2})	Alpha Delta Pi	Oklahoma State University	Stillwater, Oklahoma	2021	
22	33,783 sq ft (3,138.5 m^{2})	Alpha Tau Omega	University of Alabama	Tuscaloosa, Alabama	2011	
23	33,557 sq ft (3,117.5 m^{2})	Chi Omega	University of Missouri	Columbia, Missouri	2013	
24	32,445 sq ft (3,014.2 m^{2})	Beta Theta Pi	University of Missouri	Columbia, Missouri	2012	
25	32,400 sq ft (3,010 m^{2})	Sigma Kappa	Indiana University	Bloomington, Indiana	2005	
27 (tie)	31,000 sq ft (2,900 m^{2})	Pi Kappa Phi	University of Alabama	Tuscaloosa, Alabama	2014	
27 (tie)	31,000 sq ft (2,900 m^{2})	Phi Kappa Psi	Indiana University	Bloomington, Indiana	2014	
29	30,534 sq ft (2,836.7 m^{2})	Kappa Alpha Theta	Oklahoma State University	Stillwater, Oklahoma		
30 (tie)	30,000 sq ft (2,800 m^{2})	Pi Kappa Alpha	Missouri Science & Technology	Rolla, Missouri	2007	
30 (tie)	30,000 sq ft (2,800 m^{2})	Alpha Omicron Pi	University of Arkansas	Fayetteville, Arkansas	2009	
32	29,100 sq ft (2,700 m^{2})	Kappa Sigma	University of Oklahoma	Norman, Oklahoma	2014	
33 (tie)	29,000 sq ft (2,700 m^{2})	Phi Gamma Delta	University of Oklahoma	Norman, Oklahoma	2008	
33 (tie)	29,000 sq ft (2,700 m^{2})	Alpha Tau Omega	Kansas State University	Manhattan, Kansas	2013	
35	28,500 sq ft (2,650 m^{2})	Kappa Sigma	Missouri Science & Technology	Rolla, Missouri	2011	
36	28,070 sq ft (2,608 m^{2})	Sigma Sigma Sigma	University of Missouri	Columbia, Missouri	2012	
37	28,051 sq ft (2,606.0 m^{2})	Sigma Nu	University of Oklahoma	Norman, Oklahoma	2017	
38	28,000 sq ft (2,600 m^{2})	Pi Kappa Alpha	University of Arkansas	Fayetteville, Arkansas	2015	
39 (tie)	27,000 sq ft (2,500 m^{2})	Pi Kappa Alpha	University of Illinois	Champaign, Illinois	2011	
39 (tie)	27,000 sq ft (2,500 m^{2})	Sigma Chi	University of New Mexico	Albuquerque, New Mexico	1951	
41	26,600 sq ft (2,470 m^{2})	Alpha Chi Omega	University of Arkansas	Fayetteville, Arkansas	2018	
42	26,500 sq ft (2,460 m^{2})	Sigma Chi	University of Alabama	Tuscaloosa, Alabama	2012	
43	26,000 sq ft (2,400 m^{2})	Phi Sigma Kappa	Rensselaer Polytechnic Institute	Troy, New York	2011	
44	25,814 sq ft (2,398.2 m^{2})	Phi Gamma Delta	University of Arizona	Tucson, Arizona	2004	
45	25,425 sq ft (2,362.1 m^{2})	Sigma Alpha Epsilon	University of Cincinnati	Cincinnati, Ohio	1925	
46	25,000 sq ft (2,300 m^{2})	Kappa Sigma	University of Arkansas	Fayetteville, Arkansas	1931	
