= Chi Omega Chapter House =

Historic site in Fayetteville, Arkansas, US

- U.S. National Register of Historic Places
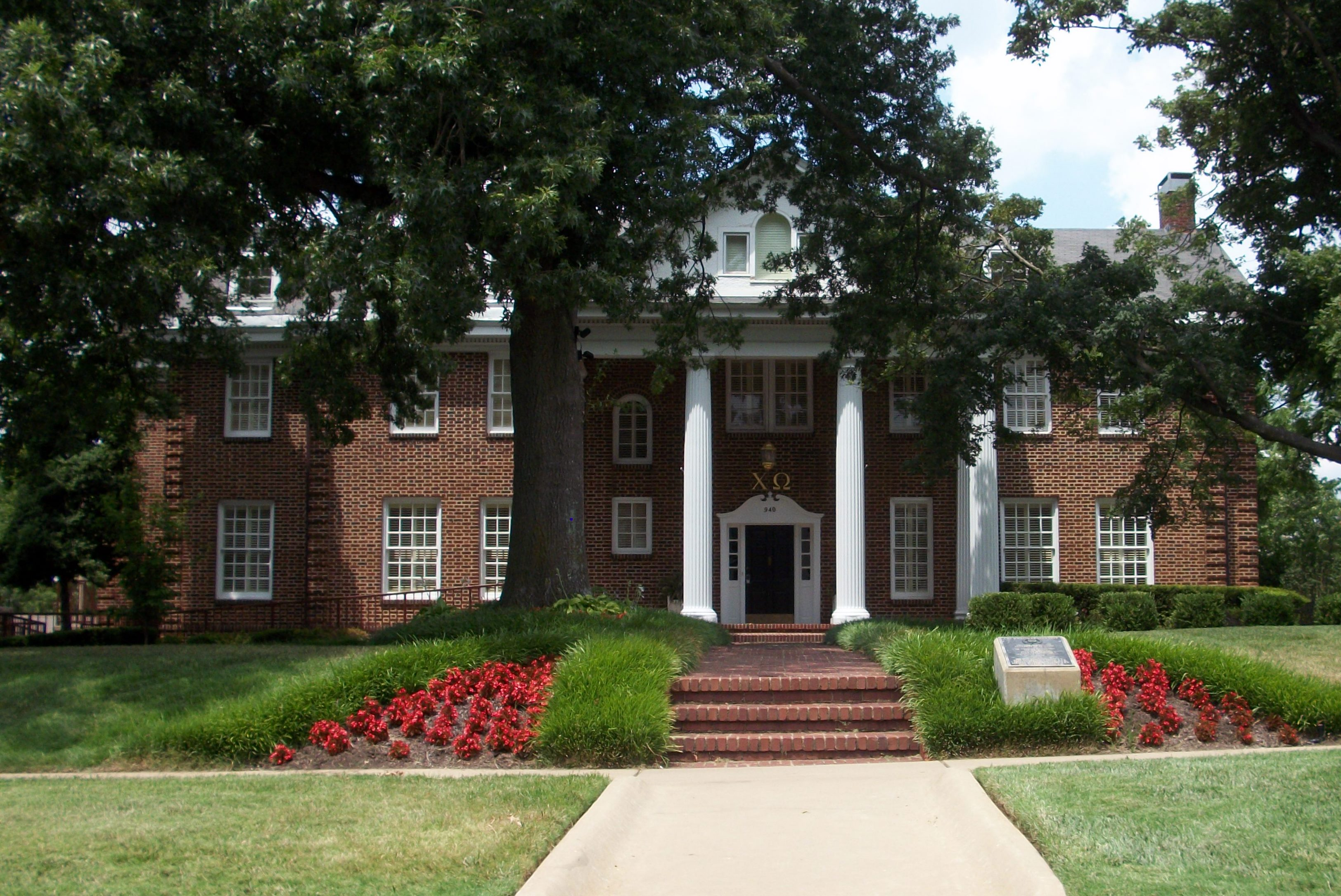
- Chi Omega House, 2011

- Location within Arkansas Location within the United States
- Location: 940 Maple Street, Fayetteville, Arkansas
- Coordinates: 36°4′13″N 94°10′24″W
- Area: less than one acre
- Built: 1927
- Built by: Wages Brothers & James Dinwiddie
- Architect: Charles L. Ellis
- Architectural style: Classical Revival
- NRHP reference No.: 95000456
- Added to NRHP: April 20, 1995

The Chi Omega Chapter House is a building built in 1927 on the campus of the University of Arkansas in Fayetteville, Arkansas. The building was listed on the National Register of Historic Places in 1995. The house is located at 940 West Maple in Fayetteville.

== History ==
The University of Arkansas became Arkansas' land-grant university in 1871 when Old Main was constructed atop McIlroy Hill. Kappa Sigma was founded as the first fraternity at the university in 1890, and in 1895 the Chi Omega fraternity for women (today called sorority) was created. (Note: Chi Omega was founded as a "fraternity for women" because the word sorority had not yet become popular. It was coined by Gamma Phi Beta in 1882 but had not yet gained wide usage by 1895.) The group bought Lot 12, Block 3 in the Oakland Place Addition in 1928, becoming the first Greek house to own campus property.

University building superintendent Charles L. Ellis was contacted to draw up plans for the house, and construction began in 1928. The contract was awarded to the Wages Brothers who worked with James Dinwiddle, an architect and Fayetteville building inspector.

Chi Omega has expanded onto the chapter house twice, first in 1941 and again in 1958. The first addition made it possible to house 75 members and a housemother. The 1958 addition expanded the kitchen and dining room and added more bathrooms, more bedrooms, a sun porch, a porte-cochère, a study room, an office, a recreation room, and a men's room.

In 2016, Chi Omega removed the 1941 and 1958 editions as part of a restoration of the 1928 structure. A new 9,000 square feet (840 m^{2}) addition was added to the western side of the house, expanding its ground floor space and adding a roof deck. In addition, the dining room and kitchen were expanded, along with a chapter room in the basement. A patio was also added to the eastern side of the house.

== Architecture ==
The Chi Omega Chapter House has distinct Colonial Revival architecture with Classical Revival details. It features a large front porch, a dentil course along the cornice line, and a pediment over the front entrance. The chapter house also includes a suspended roof supported by four Roman doric columns.

The original structure consists 10,430 square feet (969 m^{2}); after the most recent additions, it is 38,600 square feet (3,590 m^{2}).

== See also ==
- Chi Omega Greek Theater, a replica Greek architecture theater donated by Chi Omega in 1930
- University of Arkansas Campus Historic District
- National Register of Historic Places listings in Washington County, Arkansas
- North American fraternity and sorority housing
