= Sigma Sigma–Delta Chi Fraternity House =

- U.S. National Register of Historic Places
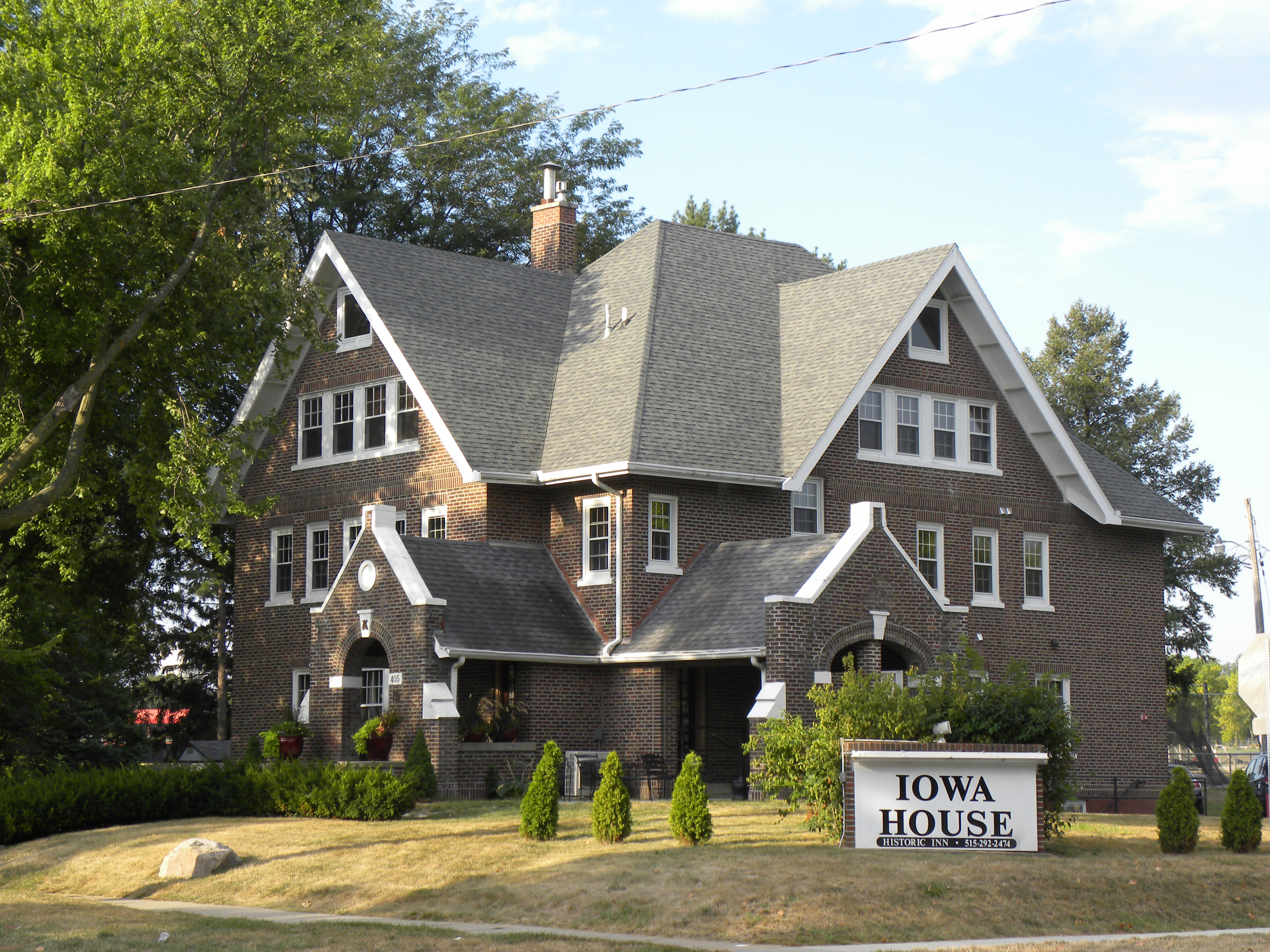

- Location within Iowa Location within the United States
- Location: 405 Hayward Ave. Ames, Iowa
- Coordinates: 42°01′07.7″N 93°39′07.5″W
- Area: less than one acre
- Built: 1924
- Architectural style: American Craftsman and Tudor Revival
- NRHP reference No.: 08000684
- Added to NRHP: July 10, 2008

The Sigma Sigma–Delta Chi Fraternity House, also known as the Iowa House, is a historic building in Ames, Iowa, United States. It is located at 405 Hayward Drive. It was built and used as a fraternity chapter house for more than eighty years and was listed on the National Register of Historic Places in 2008.

== History ==
Sigma Sigma was a local fraternity founded sometime between 1907 and 1913 at what was then called Iowa State College in Ames, Iowa. It grew in size and attempted to become a national fraternity beginning in the 1920s. The charter became constructing a new chapter house on the Ames campus.

The fraternity went dormant while they built this building, but they reformed by 1927. At that time, their chapter house was valued at $35,000 ($648,707 in today's money).

They merged with the national fraternity Delta Chi in 1933. This merger gives the building its name Sigma Sigma–Delta Chi Fraternity House. The chapter remained active at the renamed Iowa State University until 2001 when membership declined significantly and it became inactive.

Delta Chi sold the building in 2006. The former chapter house was converted into a bed and breakfast called Iowa House. The structure underwent a major renovation between 2007 and 2008. It was listed on the National Register of Historic Places in 2008.

== Architecture ==
Architecturally, Sigma Sigma–Delta Chi Fraternity House is a combination of the American Craftsman and Tudor Revival styles. It faces both Hayward Avenue and Knapp Avenue.

It is a large 2 1/2-story brick structure built in 1924. The building is capped with a hip roof that is intersected by steeply pitched gables at a lower level. There are also wide eaves with exposed beams. A porte-cochère is located on the north side of the building facing Knapp Avenue, which is a unique feature among the historic fraternity and sorority houses associated with Iowa State University.

== See also ==
- North American fraternity and sorority housing
