= Alpha Phi Fraternity House-Beta Alpha Chapter (Champaign, Illinois) =

Historic house in Champaign, Illinois, US

- Alpha Phi Fraternity House--Beta Alpha Chapter
- U.S. National Register of Historic Places
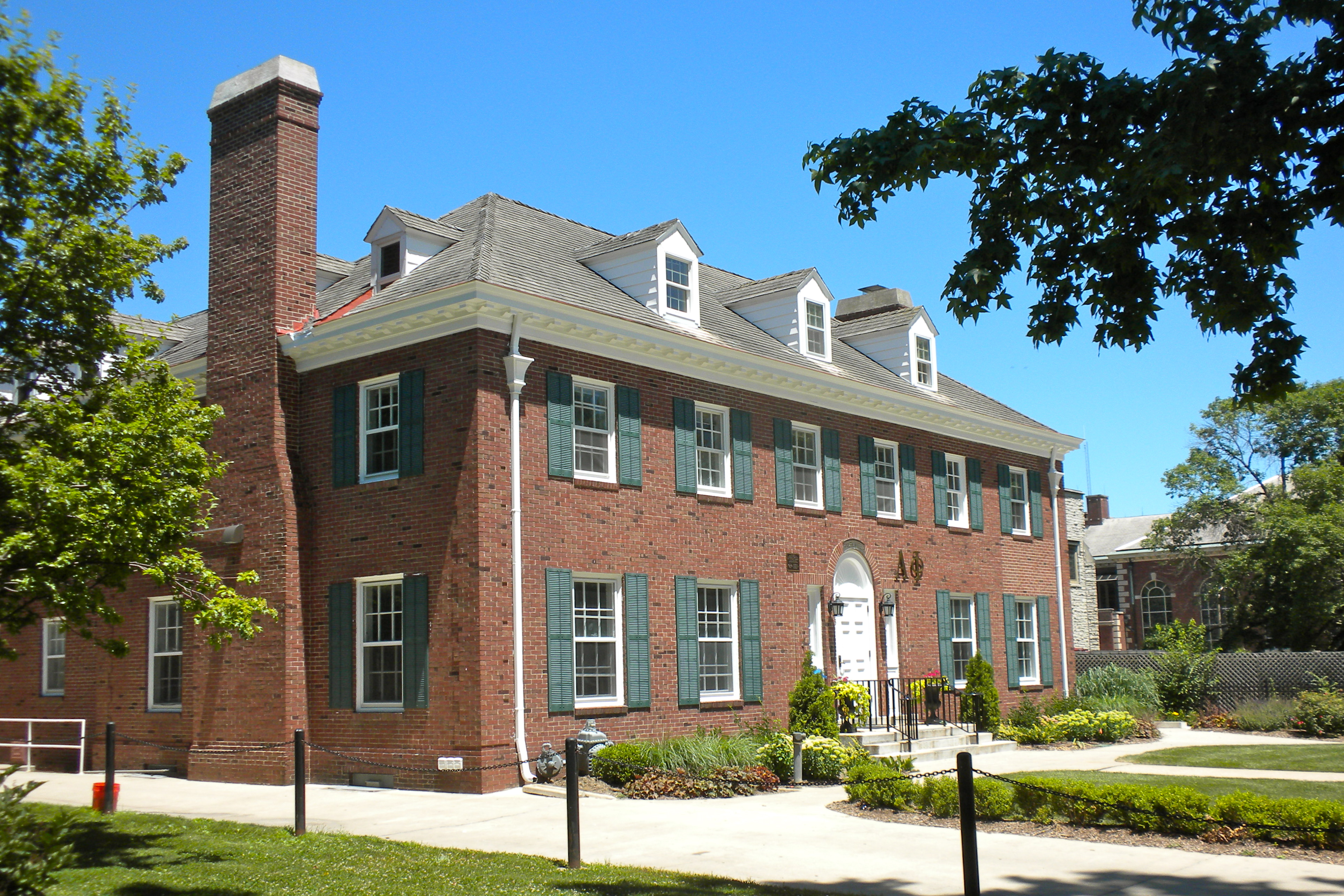

- Location within Illinois Location within the United States
- Location: 508 E. Amory Ave., Champaign, Illinois
- Coordinates: 40°6′27″N 88°13′52″W
- Area: less than one acre
- Architect: Charles Harris
- Architectural style: Georgian Revival
- MPS: Fraternity and Sorority Houses at the Urbana--Champaign Campus of the University of Illinois MPS
- NRHP reference No.: 05001250
- Added to NRHP: November 15, 2005

The Alpha Phi Fraternity House-Beta Alpha Chapter is a historic fraternity house located at the University of Illinois at Urbana–Champaign in Champaign, Illinois, United States. The house was added to the National Register of Historic Places on November 15, 2005.

== History ==
The Beta Alpha chapter of the Alpha Phi women's fraternity was formed at the University of Illinois at Urbana–Champaign in 1919 and was chartered on February 11, 1922. The Beta Alpha chapter purchased its chapter house in 1923 with the donation of Alice and Dean Clark. Its new chapter house was built in 1909 as a private residence. The chapter house is located at 508 East Armory Avenue in Champaign.

The house was added to the National Register of Historic Places as the Alpha Phi Fraternity House-Beta Alpha Chapter on November 15, 2005.

== Architecture ==
Alpha Phi Fraternity House-Beta Alpha Chapter was originally a Tudor Revival style private home. In 1937–38, architect Charles Harris of Decatur remodeled the house in the Georgian Revival style. The work was completed by contractor Edward M. DeAtley.

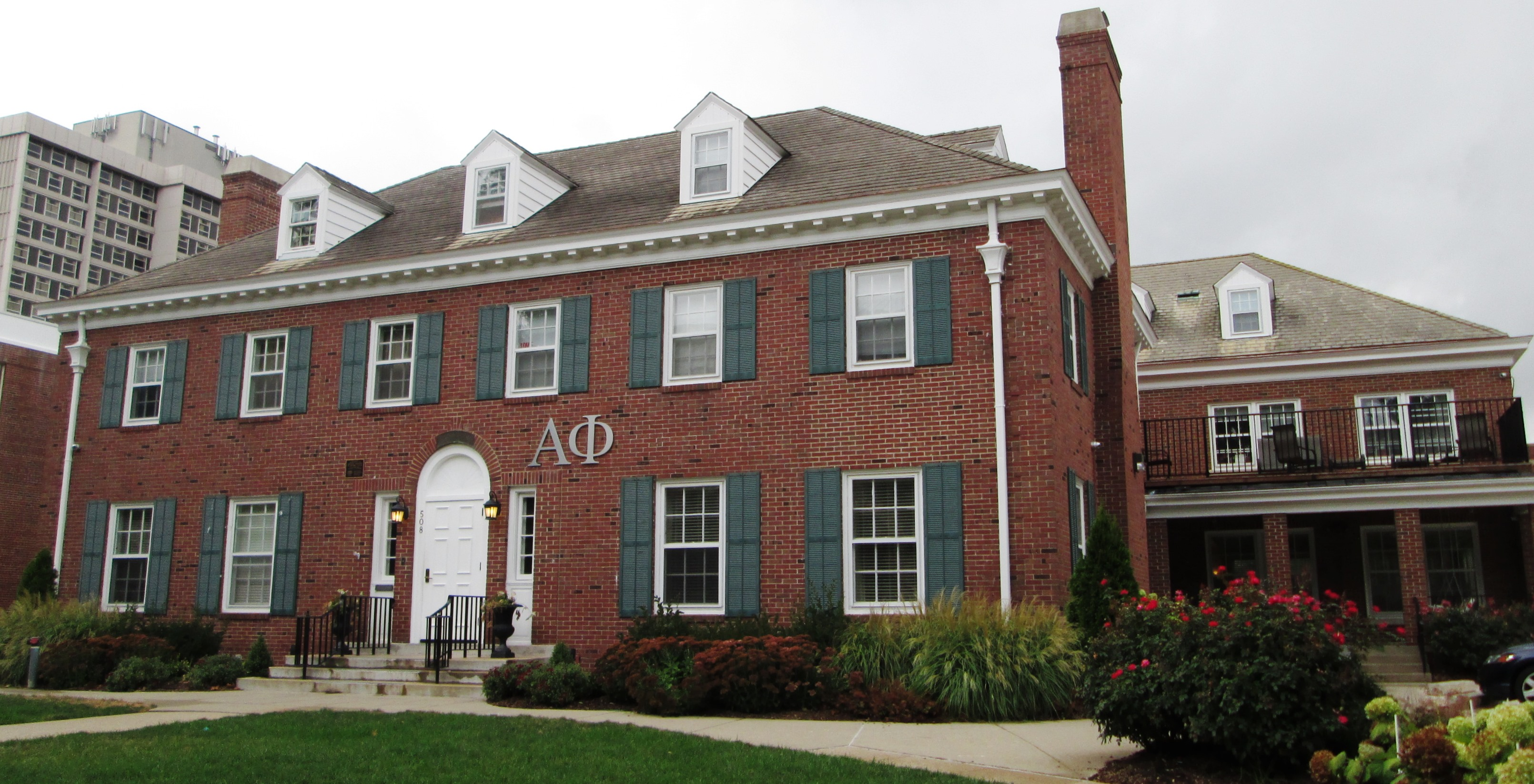
Alpha Phi Fraternity House with addition to the right

The two-story brick building has a five-bay exterior with a central entrance. Its key Georgian details include raised brick quoins, pedimented dormers projecting from a gable roof, and large brick chimneys on either side of the house. An addition was added to the house in 1950.

== See also ==
- North American fraternity and sorority housing
