= Colonials Club House =

Historic house in Ames, Iowa, US

- U.S. National Register of Historic Places
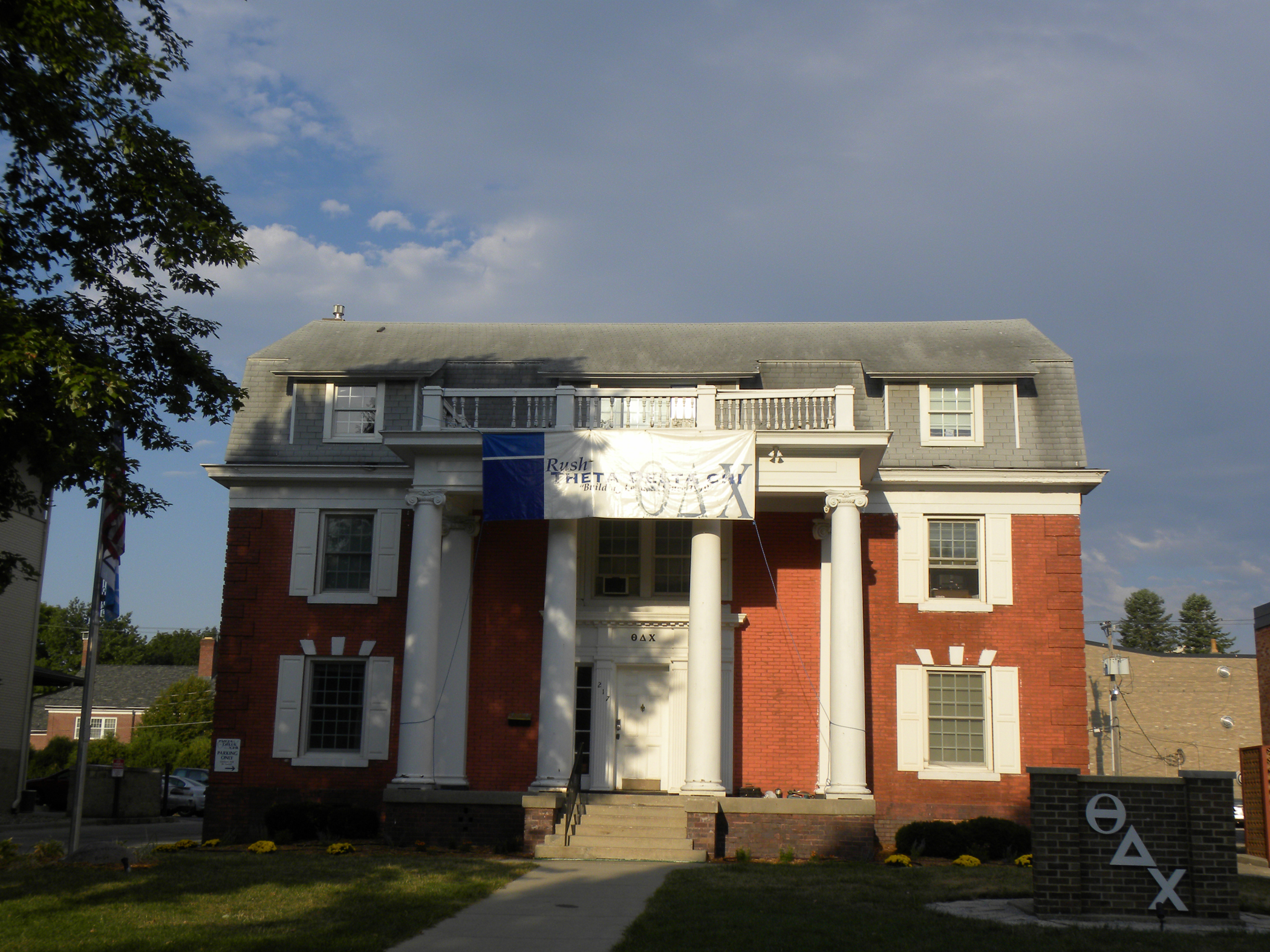

- Location within Iowa Location within the United States
- Location: 217 Ash Ave. Ames, Iowa
- Coordinates: 42°01′15.8″N 93°38′41.7″W
- Area: less than one acre
- Built: 1910
- Built by: James Thompson & Son
- Architect: Proudfoot & Bird; Woodburn & O'Neil
- Architectural style: Colonial Revival
- NRHP reference No.: 12000003
- Added to NRHP: February 8, 2012

The Colonials Club House, also known as the Beta Deuteron Charge House of Theta Delta Chi, is a historic building located in Ames, Iowa, United States. The building was significant in the development of the city's Fourth Ward. It was listed on the National Register of Historic Places in 2012.

== History ==
The Colonials Club House was built for a local fraternity, The Colonials or Colonial Club, which was established in 1908. Its address is 217 Ash Avenue in Ames, Iowa. Before its construction in 1910, off-campus student housing was clustered on the west side of the Iowa State College campus (now Iowa State University) in the West Gate neighborhood. This building opened up the southeast side of the campus, and it became the preferred location for new fraternity and sorority residences. Thus, the building was significant in the development of the city's Fourth Ward.

In December 1919, the Colonials became the Beta Deuteron charge (chapter) of Theta Delta Chi (ΘΔΧ) fraternity. However, the forme Colonials Cub House was owned by the Colonial Realty Company whose stockholders were Colonial alumni who were not becoming members of Theta Delta Chi. Despite this, the house had the best location on campus and was in good condition.

In 1920, the Beta Deuteron charge formed the Theta Delta Chi Realty Company of Ames Iowa which purchased the Colonial Club House for $15,000 ($241,071 in 2022 money). The new company issued $20,000 in secured bonds to fund the purchase and renovation of the former clubhouse. The Ames National Bank invested $8,000 in the bonds.

The building was listed on the National Register of Historic Places in 2012.

== Architecture ==
The Colonials Club House started a new style in the future design of fraternity and sorority chapter houses at Iowa State. Earlier chapter houses in Ames were vernacular framed structures that were designed to look like single-family dwellings. Designed by the Des Moines architectural firm of Proudfoot & Bird, this two-and-a-half-story brick structure featured the Colonial Revival style, which became one of the prominent styles for fraternity and sorority houses associated with the university. It was also the first masonry chapter house at Iowa State.

The house's entrance features a large scale two-story entry porch with four columns and two pilasters that have stylized Ionic capitals, supporting a cornice and frieze. The frieze includes the Greek letters ΘΔΧ.

The first floor includes the living room, a back hall (library), a dining room, and a front hall. The front hall has oak paneling, built-in seating, oak flooring, and an oak staircase. Oak pocket doors lead to the living room which as an oak fireplace mantel and an oak coffered ceiling.

The building was renovated and expanded in 1920 to reconfigure the main level, expand the size of the living room, and add a sleeping porch. This expansion cost $5,000. A second addition in 1926 included a one-story accommodation for the fraternity's house mother. A third addition in 1966 was designed by the Des Moines architectural firm of Woodburn & O'Neil.

== See also ==
- North American fraternity and sorority housing
