= Iowa Beta Chapter of Sigma Phi Epsilon =

- U.S. National Register of Historic Places
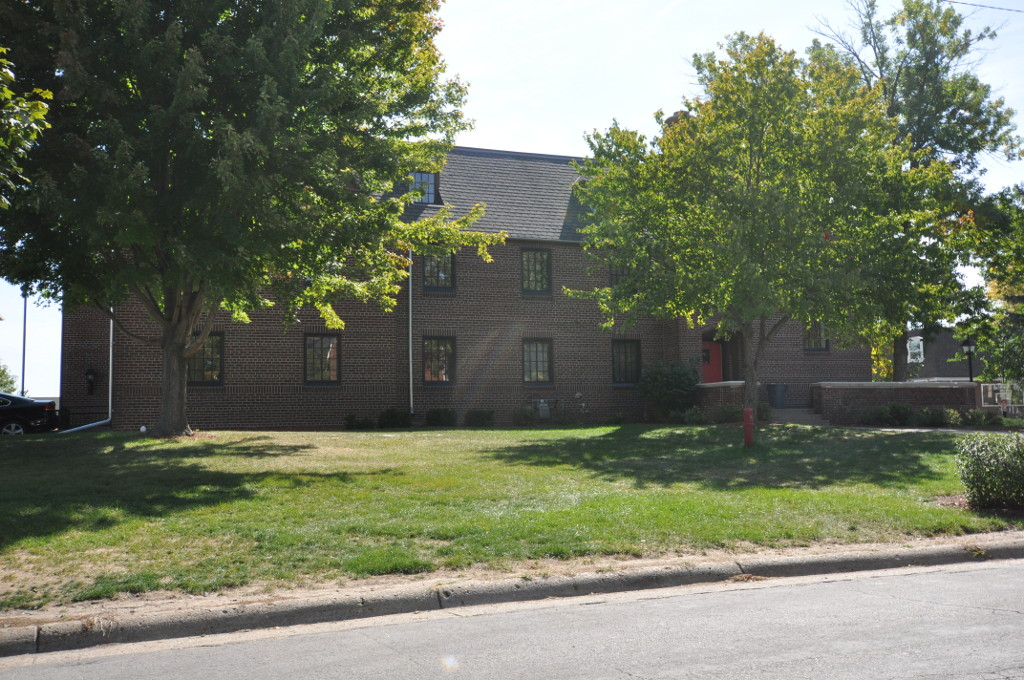

- Location within Iowa Location within the United States
- Location: 228 Gray Ave. Ames, Iowa
- Coordinates: 42°01′13.8″N 93°38′25.6″W
- Area: less than one acre
- Built: 1931
- Architect: Amos B. Emery
- Architectural style: Tudor Revival
- NRHP reference No.: 13001140
- Added to NRHP: February 5, 2014

Iowa Beta Chapter of Sigma Phi Epsilon is a historic building in Ames, Iowa, United States. It was built by the Iowa Beta chapter of Sigma Phi Epsilon fraternity in 1916. It was listed on the National Register of Historic Places in 2014.

== History ==
Sigma Phi Epsilon is a collegiate social fraternity that was established at Richmond College (now the University of Richmond) in November 1901. The Iowa Beta chapter of Sigma Phi Epsilon was chartered at Iowa State College (now Iowa State University) on April 20, 1916. In October 1929, the chapter announced plans to build a $50,000 ($937,500 in 2024). The house was completed in 1931 at 228 Gray Avenue in Ames, Iowa.

A fire damaged the second and third floors on May 15, 1943. After repairs, the house was reoccupied by the fraternity in the fall of 1943. However, that fall, two-thirds of the chapter's members were serving in the military, so part of the building was rented to female students through the end of World War II.

The building was listed on the National Register of Historic Places on February 5, 2014, as the Iowa Beta Chapter of Sigma Phi Epsilon.

== Architecture ==
Iowa Beta Chapter of Sigma Phi Epsilon was designed by architect Amos B. Emery of the Emory and Linn firm in Des Moines, Iowa. Emory designed the four-story chapter house in Tudor Revival style. It is the only Tudor Revival style building designed by Emory, and only one of two fraternity houses that he designed; the other being the Sigma Kappa chapter house located across the street from Iowa Beta's chapter house.

This large brick structure was built in 1931 for the Iowa Beta chapter of the Sigma Phi Epsilon fraternity. It features ornamental half-timbering and stucco veneered walls, a steeply pitched roof with two separate cross-gabled sections, and a two-story wing that is oriented diagonally from the main body of the house. Above the main entrance is the Sigma Phi Epsilon crest that is carved into white limestone and a balcony with a steel railing. Three of the four floors are above grade, and one is exposed on the back side via the sloping .53 acre lot.

Inside, the main level includes a receiving hall, lounge, dormitory, study rooms, vestibule, and the house mother's apartment. The receiving hall has floor-to-ceiling wood paneling in the Tudor Revival style. The second floor has a balcony that overlooks the lounge; it was designed for orchestras when there were dances in the parlor. The balcony also served as a lounge and music room. In addition to bedrooms and bathrooms, the second floor also had a card room. The third floor has bedrooms and bathrooms. The basement includes a dining room and chapter room.

In 1952, the kitchen and the house mother's quarters were expanded. In 2010, an addition by Accord Architecture Companyto added more bedrooms to each floor.

== See also ==
- North American fraternity and sorority housing
