= Alpha House (Detroit) =

- U.S. National Register of Historic Places
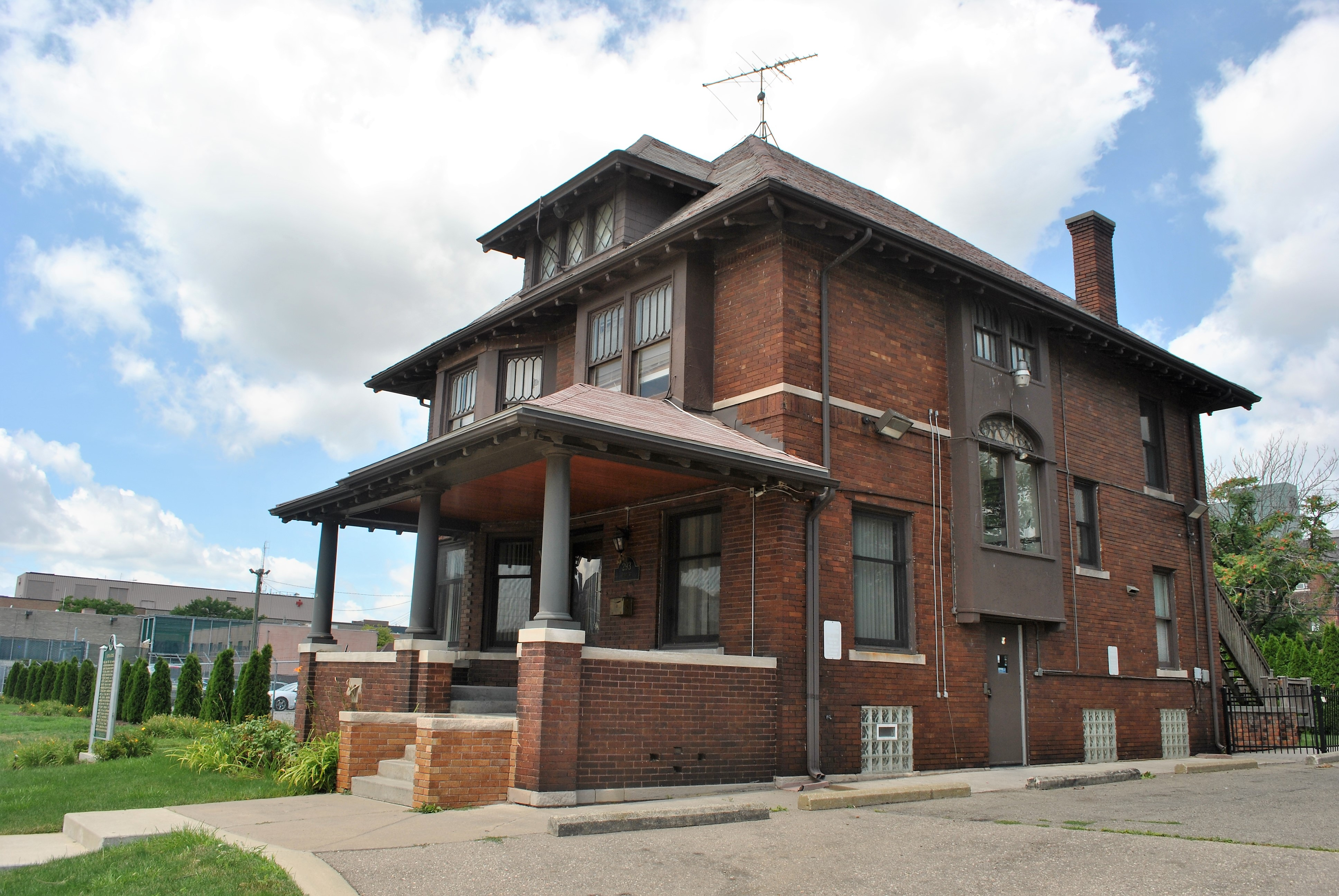
- Interactive map
- Location: 293 Eliot St. Detroit, Michigan
- Coordinates: 42°20′53″N 83°3′13″W
- Built: 1912
- Architectural style: Craftsman vernacular
- MPS: The Civil Rights Movement and the African American Experience in 20th Century Detroit MPS
- NRHP reference No.: 100006860
- Added to NRHP: August 26, 2021

Alpha House is a fraternity house located at 293 Eliot Street in Detroit, Michigan. It is significant as the longtime headquarters of the Gamma Lambda chapter of Alpha Phi Alpha fraternity. The house was listed on the National Register of Historic Places on August 26, 2021.

== History ==
Alpha Phi Alpha was founded at Cornell University in 1906. The organization was the first intercollegiate Greek-letter fraternity established for African American men. The fraternity expanded, and by the 1910s a number of successful Alpha Phi Alpha brothers were living in Detroit. The Gamma Lambda chapter of the fraternity was chartered on March 22, 1919. Over the next few decades, the chapter grew as more successful African Americans moved to the city. The chapter met at various locations through the city, but did not have a permanent home.

The house at 293 Eliot Street was built in about 1912, and was first occupied by Herman and Lena Rosenthal. Herman died in 1929, and Lena remained in the house until about 1939, when it was purchased by the Gamma Lambda chapter of Alpha Phi Alpha. The chapter used the house continuously until the present day, and it was the center of the social programs run by the fraternity. The building was renovated in 2003.

== Description ==
The Alpha House is a two-story, rectangular brick building, built in a vernacular Craftsman style with a hipped roof and asymmetric facade. The front façade has a partial-width elevated front porch, surrounded by a low brick wall with Tuscan columns and capped with a hipped roof. The porch is reached by a set of concrete steps, and two concrete steps that lead up to the upper end of the porch and the main entry. On the left side of the porch is a two-story bay window with double-hung windows; the other half has a box bay window on the second floor above the porch. A hipped dormer projects above the roof in the center of the facade.

== See also ==
- North American fraternity and sorority housing
