= Sigma Alpha Epsilon Chapter House of Miami University =

Historic house in Oxford, Ohio, US

- U.S. National Register of Historic Places
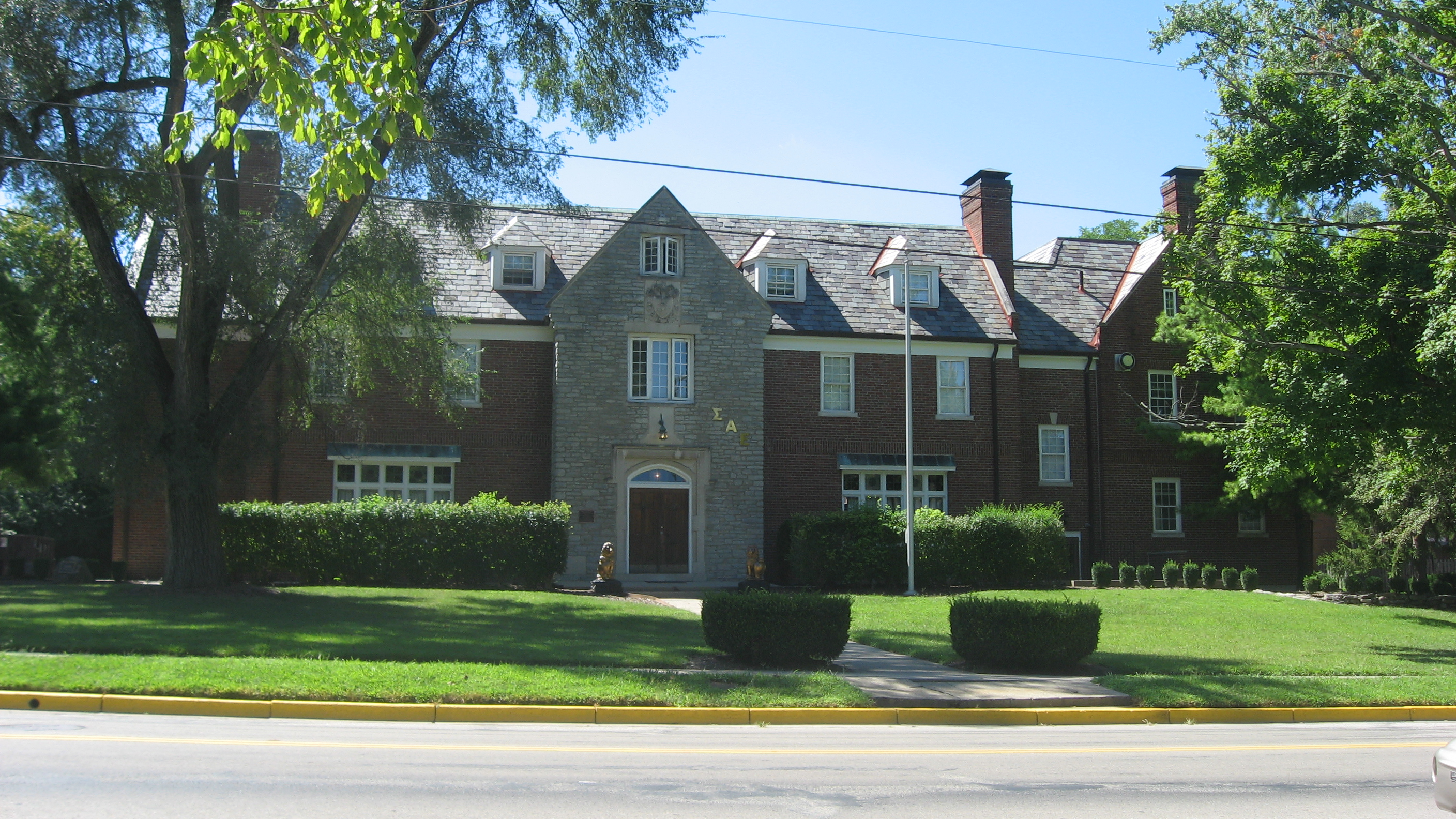
- Front of the house

- Location within Ohio Location within the United States
- Location: 310 Tallawanda Road, Oxford, Ohio, US
- Coordinates: 39°30′51″N 84°44′06″W
- Area: less than one acre
- Built: 1938
- Architect: Russell S. Potter
- Architectural style: Tudor Revival architecture
- NRHP reference No.: 05000022
- Added to NRHP: February 8, 2005

Sigma Alpha Epsilon Chapter House of Miami University, also known as Sulgrave Manor, is a historic building in Oxford, Ohio. It was built as a chapter house for the Ohio Tau chapter of Sigma Alpha Epsilon fraternity in 1937 and 1938. It was listed in the National Register of Historic Places in 2005.

== History ==
Sigma Alpha Epsilon is a collegiate social fraternity that was established at the University of Alabama on March 9, 1856. Its Ohio Tau chapter was chartered at the University of Miami in Oxford, Ohio on October 4, 1919.

Ohio Tau built its chapter house at 310 Tallawanda Road in 1937 and 1938. The cornerstone during homecoming on November 9, 1937. The house was completed in the spring of 1938 and cost $60,000. It was dedicated during homecoming on November 5, 1938. The chapters calls the house Sulgrave Manor, after the English house it was modeled after.

It was listed in the National Register on February 8, 2005 as Sigma Alpha Epsilon Chapter House of Miami University.

== Architecture ==
Sigma Alpha Epsilon Chapter House of Miami University was designed by architect Russell S. Potter. It was modeled after Sulgrave Manor, the ancestral home of George Washington in Oxford, England. The brick and stone house is in Tudor revival style with an asymmetrical facade. Its entrance includes a stone arch and pillars surrounding a double wooden doors. The house has a hip roof with dormer.

The house was renovated in 1965 and 1995, including the addition of an addition in the northwest corner.

== See also ==
- North American fraternity and sorority housing
