= Old Beta Theta Pi Fraternity House =

Historic house in Oregon, United States

- U.S. National Register of Historic Places
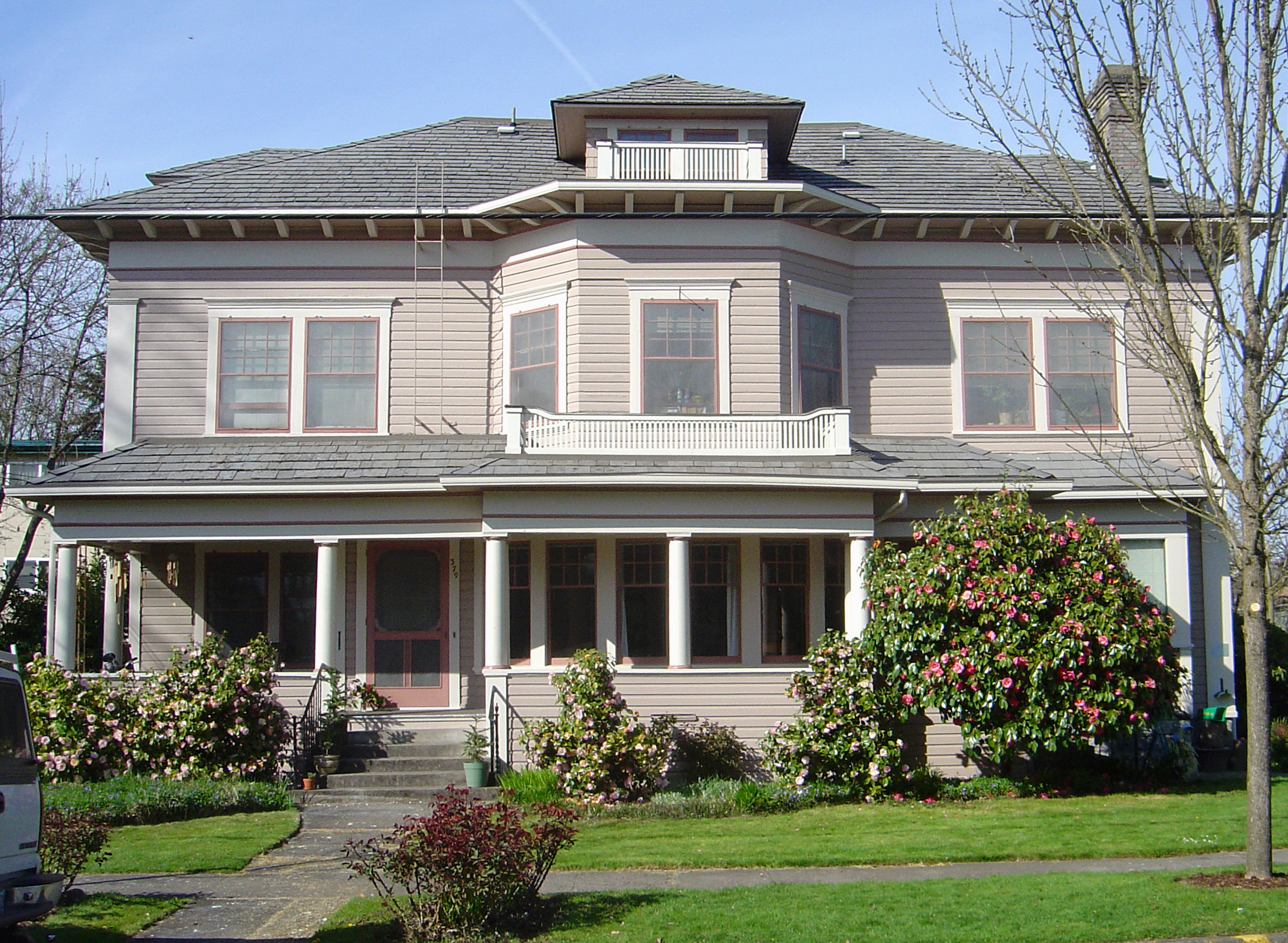
- Location: 379 - 381 East 12th Avenue; Eugene, Oregon; 44.046636°N 123.086959°W
- Built: 1906
- Architectural style: American Craftsman, American Foursquare
- NRHP reference No.: 89001858
- Added to NRHP: October 30, 1989

The Old Beta Theta Pi Fraternity House is a historic building on East 12th Avenue in Eugene, Oregon, United States. It is an American Craftsman and American Foursquare. The house was used by the Beta Theta Pi fraternity of the University of Oregon for fifteen years and by the Delta Zeta sorority for six years. It was added to the National Register of Historic Places in 1989.

== History ==
The Delta Alpha was organized on June 4, 1906, as a local fraternity at the University of Oregon. Between 1906 and the fall of 1907, John B. Kronebusch, a local capitalist, built a house for the Delta Alpha on 189 East 12th Avenue (changed to 381 East 12th Avenue in 1914) in Eugene, Oregon. The house cost $7,500 ($268,750 in 2024) and was first occupied by the fraternity in the spring of 1907.

Kronebusch leased the house to Delta Alpha the Beta Theta Pi fraternity for five years, with an option to purchase it. For that purpose, each member pledged to contribute $100 to the building fund. Delta Alpha became the Beta Rho chapter of Beta Theta Pi on December 3, 1909, the second national fraternity on the University of Oregon campus. The fraternity never purchased the house, but did lease it until 1922 when the fraternity moved to a different location.

On September 15, 1923, Kronebusch sold the Omega chapter of the Delta Zeta sorority, which occupied the house until November 27, 1929. The sorority chapter closed due to the Great Depression. Next, the house was used a private residence by Nellie and George Perkins, from November 1929 to August 1931, and Leila B. and P.S. Chase from August 1931 to November 1934. Physician and surgeon George I. Hurley and his family owned the house from November 15, 1934, to September 24, 1936, adding a free-standing garage in 1935. The house was divided into apartments under the ownership of Jean Dressler from 1936 to 1950.

It was added to the National Register of Historic Places on October 30, 1989, as the Old Beta Theta Pi Fraternity House.

== Architecture ==
The Old Beta Theta Pi Fraternity House is a two and a half story American Foursquare in the American Craftsman (or American Craftsman Bungalow) style, showing considerable Prairie School influence. A two-story addition was constructed in the mid-1930s, of materials compatible with the original house. The house is built from a light wood frame, with six-inch-wide beveled shiplap on the lower level and a corner pilaster with a small ogee cap at each corner. It has a shallow hip roof, with a third-floor dormer window. The front porch also has a hip roof and is supported by round columns with Doric capitals. Its original front door was made from Douglas fir.

The interior of the house included a dining room, a kitchen, a library, a lounging room, a music room, a parlor, twelve bedrooms, a small vestibule, and servants' apartments. The bedrooms were sized for two students. The parlor included a large fireplace with a tiled hearth and a mantle flanked by paired pilaster columns. The room also has a crescent-shaped bay, consisting of five windows; it overlooks a small porch.

In 1936, the upper two levels were turned into apartments separate from the first level and were given a different address of 1176 Mill Street. The exterior and all of the apartments retain a high degree of integrity, with minor modifications made mostly before 1937. However, the original grand staircase was enclosed. The house now has seven apartments in the three-story section and a studio apartment in its basement.

== See also ==
- North American fraternity and sorority housing
