= Delta Upsilon Fraternity House (Champaign, Illinois) =

- U.S. National Register of Historic Places
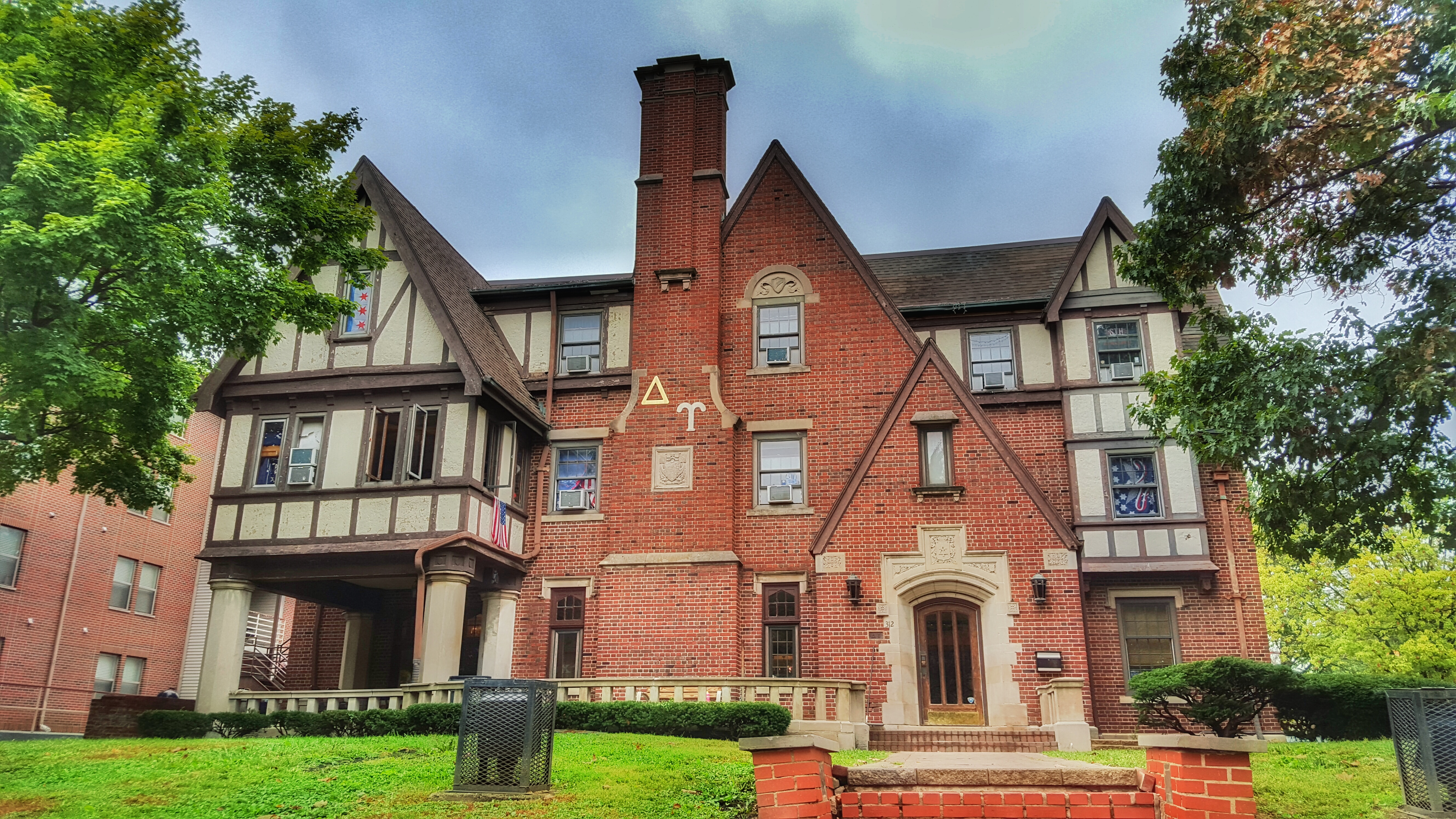

- Location within Illinois Location within the United States
- Location: 312 E. Armory Ave., Champaign, Illinois
- Coordinates: 40°6′20″N 88°14′2″W
- Area: less than one acre
- Built: 1926
- Architect: Stuebe, Leonard
- Architectural style: Tudor Revival
- MPS: Fraternity and Sorority Houses at the Urbana--Champaign Campus of the University of Illinois MPS
- NRHP reference No.: 90000749
- Added to NRHP: May 21, 1990

The Delta Upsilon Fraternity House is a historic fraternity house at the University of Illinois at Urbana–Champaign, located at 312 East Armory Avenue in Champaign, Illinois. The fraternity house was added to the National Register of Historic Places in 1990.

== History ==
Delta Upsilon is a social collegiate fraternity that was established as an anti-secret society at Williams College in 1834. The Illinois chapter of Delta Upsilon fraternity was chartered in 1905. The chapter occupied several house before it built this current structure. The chapter built its chapter house between 1926 and 1927 for $100,000 ($1,818,609 in 2024). It is located at 312 East Armory Avenue in Champaign, Illinois. The chapter house provides housed for members and is used for the fraternity's activities.

The fraternity has continuously occupied the house. Delta Upsilon Fraternity House (Champaign, Illinois) was added to the National Register of Historic Places on May 21, 1990. The fraternity is renovating the chapter house during the 2024-2025 academic year.

== Architecture ==
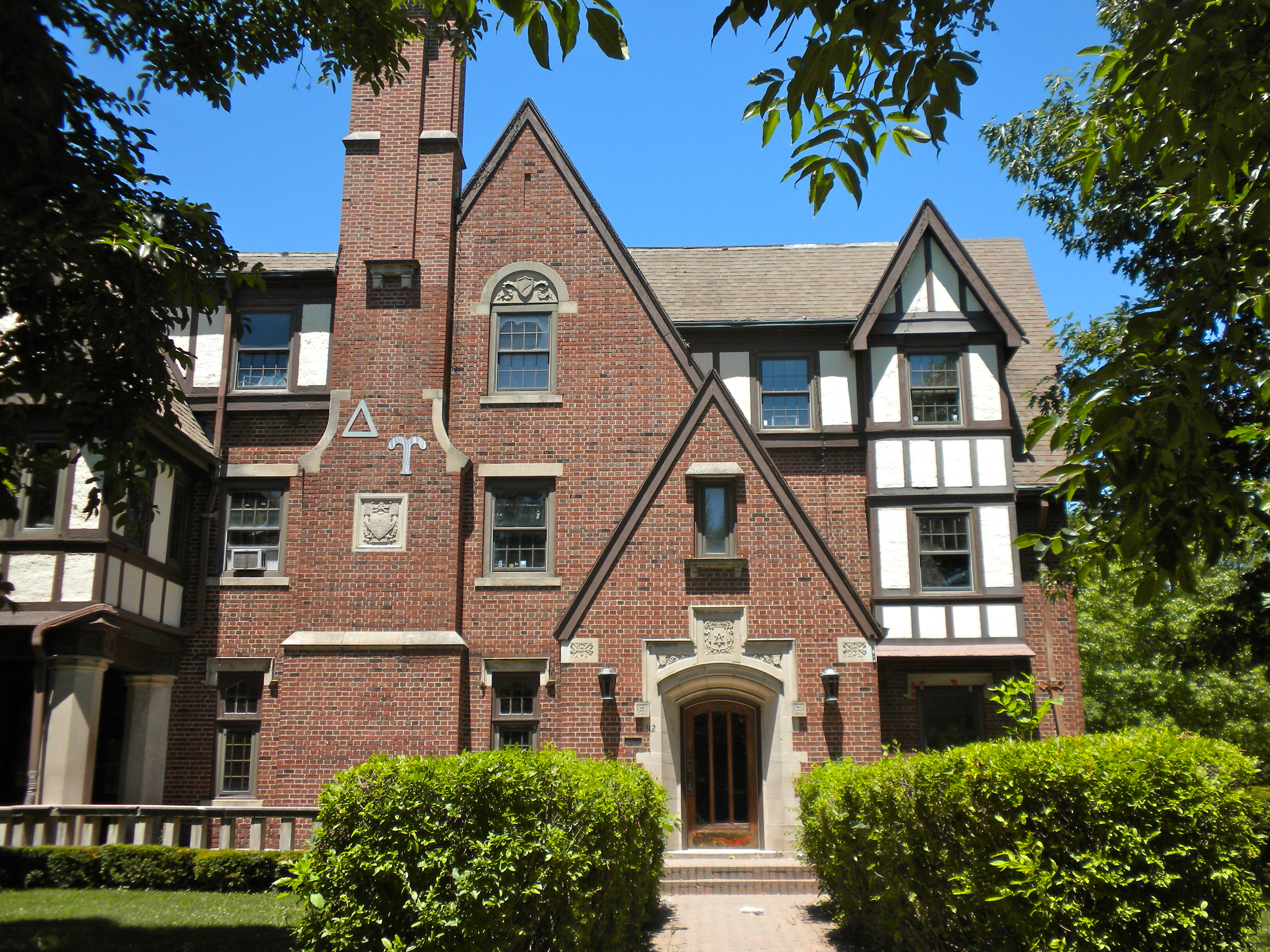
Closeup of mid-section of the Illinois Delta Upsilon chapter house.

Architect Leonard Steube of Danville, Illinois designed the Tudor Revival fraternity house to serve as a chapter house for the fraternity. At the time, Steube was a graduate student at the University of Illinois. Steube combined elements of the more formal types of Tudor Revival architecture, such as its brick gabled entrance with stone details, with less formal elements such as extensive half-timbering.

The two-and-a-half-story English bond brick house has a symmetrical design with limestone detailing around its windows, a large triple-flue exterior chimney, and an open porch supported by two hexagonal columns. It has copper downspouts and copper sconces. Above the original wooden door is a shield with the Greek letter ΔΥ carved in limestone. In addition, there is a representation of the fraternity's shield, carved in stone on the face of the chimney.

Inside the house, it has a cross-shaped floor place with Gothic door frames, Tudor-style arched fireplaces, and wooden wainscoting. Its vestibule has a brick floor. The building has been updated to meet local fire codes.

== See also ==
- North American fraternity and sorority housing
