= Phi Delta Theta Fraternity House (Lincoln, Nebraska) =

- U.S. National Register of Historic Places
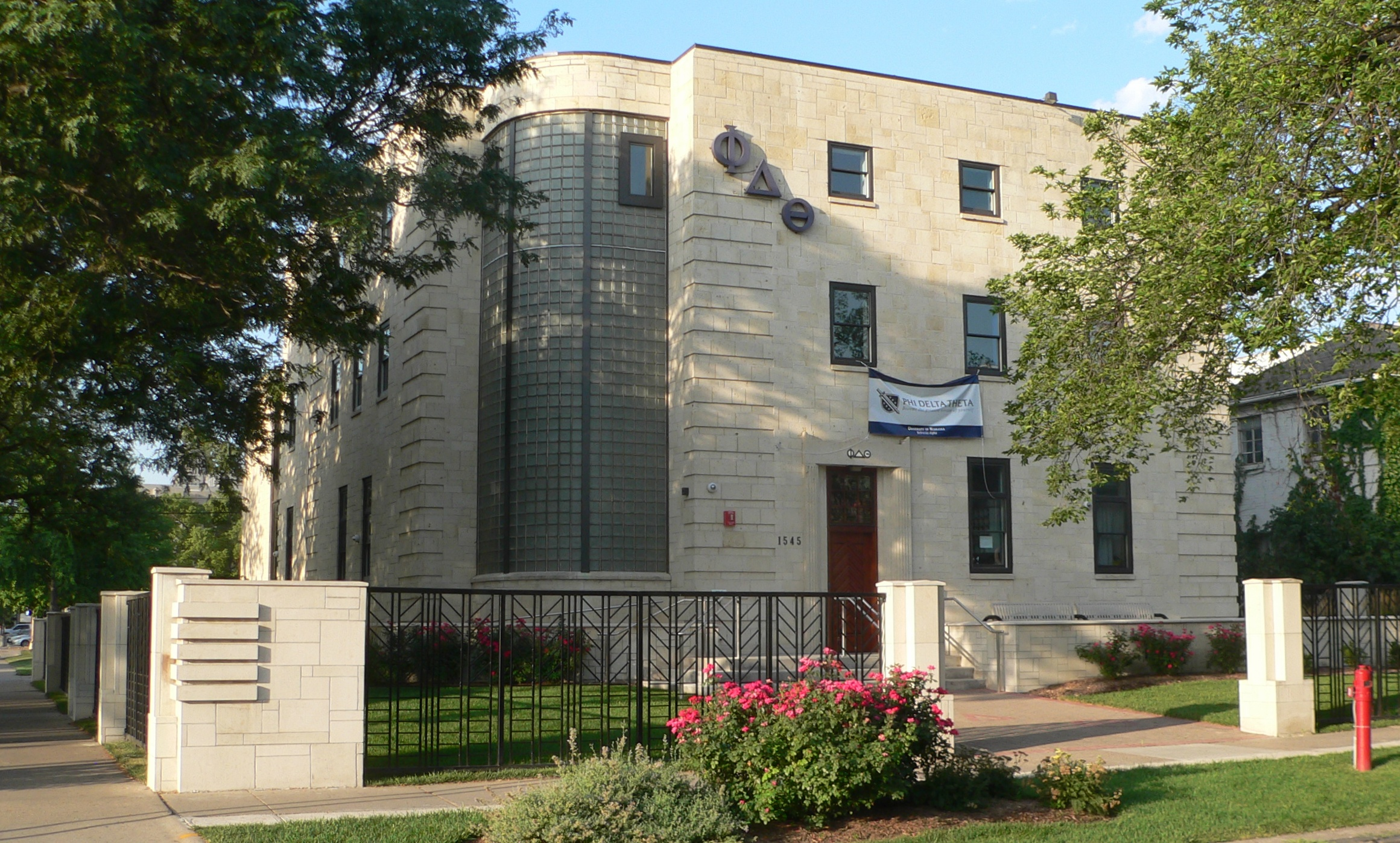
- The house in 2012

- Location within Nebraska Location within the United States
- Location: 1545 R Street; Lincoln, Nebraska
- Coordinates: 40°48′56″N 96°41′59″W
- Area: Less than one acre
- Built: 1937; 89 years ago
- Built by: Olsson Construction
- Architect: Martin I. Aitken
- Architectural style: Art Deco
- NRHP reference No.: 86001183
- Added to NRHP: May 28, 1986

The Phi Delta Theta Fraternity House is a historic house on the campus of the University of Nebraska–Lincoln in Lincoln, Nebraska. The Art Deco-style house was built for the university's chapter of Phi Delta Theta. It was added to the National Register of Historic Places in 1986.

== History ==
The Nebraska Alpha chapter of the Phi Delta Theta fraternity was founded in 1875 at the University of Nebraska–Lincoln in Lincoln, Nebraska. It was the first fraternity at the university. However, it was inactive from 1876 to 1883 due to an anti-fraternity movement on campus.

The fraternity built a new chapter house on 1545 R Street in 1937, south of the university's campus. The house cost $55,000 ($1,291,566 in 2024) to build. The fraternity moved into its new house in September 1937. It was the fourth house occupied by the fraternity.

The Lincoln City Council designated the house a Lincoln Landmark in September 1985. It was listed on the National Register of Historic Places on May 28, 1986, as the Phi Delta Theta Fraternity House.

== Architecture ==
The fraternity hired local architect Martin I. Aitken to design its new chapter house on 1545 R Street in 1937. The chapter house was built by the Olson Construction Company from concrete, steel, and buff stone, with no wood except for interior trim. The house is an L-shaped, three-story structure with a flat roof. It is in Art Deco style, which was rarely used for residential construction in Lincoln.

The house's main facade is covered in Kansas limestone over brick and structural clay tile. The other exterior walls was covered in buff colored brick. Each story of the façade has three windows, that decrease in size from the ground level to the third floor.

In the northeast corner, the house features a rounded tower of translucent glass blocks. Inside, the tower is a cantilevered circular staircase with a steel railing. There are incised horizontal grooves at the corners, suggesting quoins. The building is enclosed by a metal fence with a geometric Art Deco motif.

The Phi Delta Theta House's interior has a foyer, a reception hall, a living room, a dining room, a card room, several studies, a kitchen, a trophy room, a chapter room, a house mother's room, and fourteen bedrooms to sleep thirty students. The living room has a fireplace with a limestone mantle, carved to resemble the "quoin" exterior feature. An L-shaped, two-story addition, built of similar materials, was added in 1966.

== See also ==
- List of Art Deco architecture in the United States
- North American fraternity and sorority housing
