= Alpha Tau Omega Fraternity House (West Lafayette, Indiana) =

Historic house in West Lafayette, Indiana, US

- U.S. National Register of Historic Places
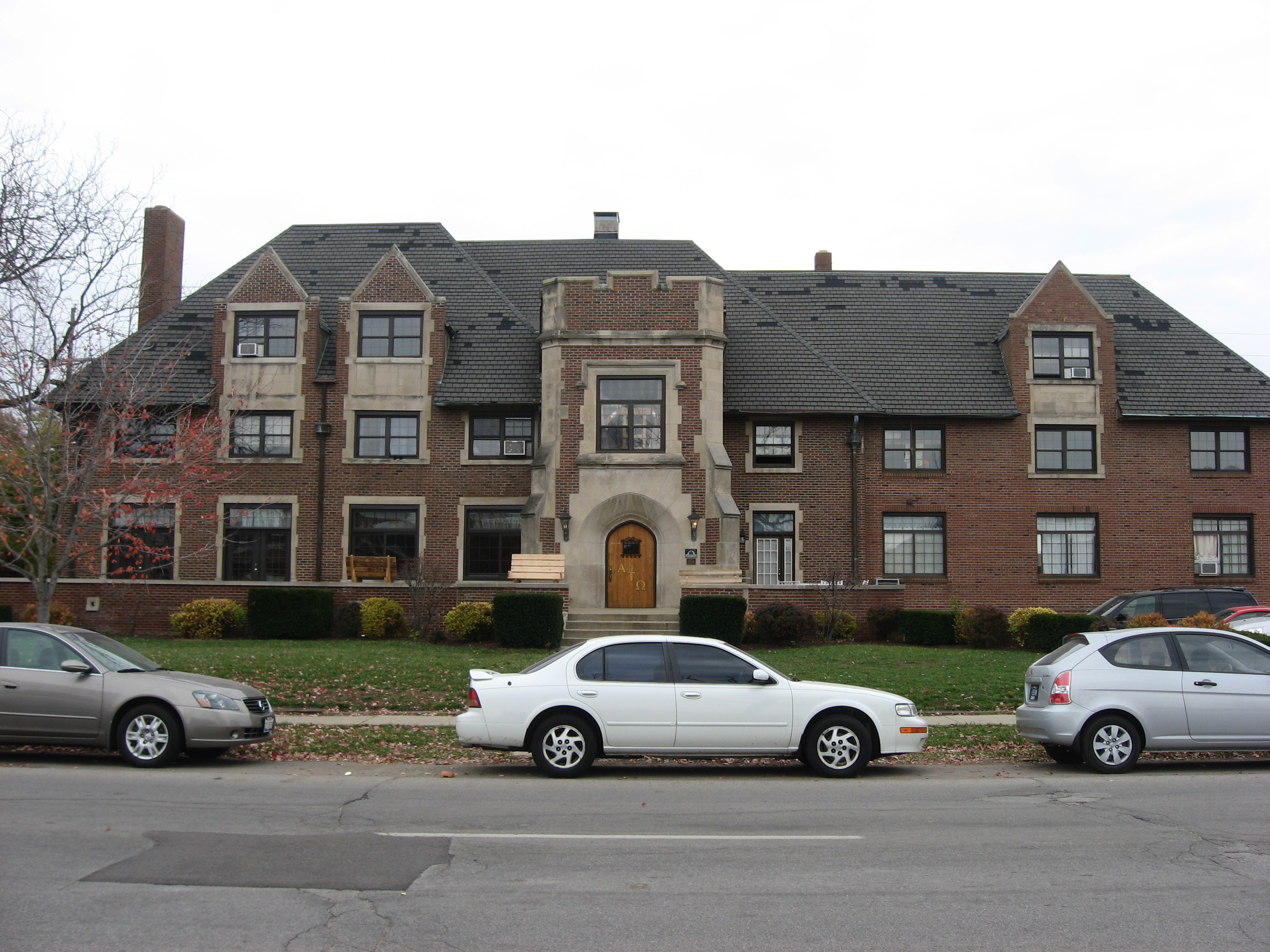
- Alpha Tau Omega, November 2009

- Location within Tippecanoe County, Indiana Location within Indiana Location within the United States
- Location: 314 Russell St., West Lafayette, Indiana
- Coordinates: 40°25′39″N 86°55′7″W
- Area: less than one acre
- Built: 1920
- Architect: Daggett, Robert Frost; Stackhouse, Allan
- Architectural style: Tudor Revival
- NRHP reference No.: 02000197
- Added to NRHP: March 20, 2002

Alpha Tau Omega Fraternity House, also known as Maltese Manor, is a historic fraternity house located at Purdue University in West Lafayette, Indiana. It was listed on the National Register of Historic Places on March 20, 2002. In 2023, it was adapted into the Revive 314 student apartment complex.

== History ==
Alpha Tau Omega Fraternity House housed the Indiana Gamma Omicron chapter of the Alpha Tau Omega fraternity at Purdue University from its construction until May 2021. The Gamma Omicron chapter started as a campus dance club known as the Debonair Club in 1902. In the fall of 1903, the club rented a house on Sheetz Street and began looking for a national fraternity to join. At a meeting on October 17, 1903, the club's members decided to pursue membership in Alpha Tau Omega. The club became the Gamma Omicron chapter of Alpha Tau Omega on November 25, 1904.

In 1906, the Alpha Tau Omega Chapter House Association was incorporated in Indiana; its purpose was to build a chapter house for the fraternity. In the meantime, its rented chapter house was destroyed in a fire on October 25, 1908. The fraternity rented a replacement and began actively raising funds to build a chapter house. The association purchased three lots on the corner of Fourth and Russell Streets for $3,465 in 1912.

Purdue and ATO alumni oversaw the construction of Alpha Tau Omega Fraternity House in the summer of 1920 for $28,000 ($450,000 in 2022 money). Also known as Maltese Manor, the chapter house is located at 314 Russell Street in West Lafayette, Indiana.

In 1994, the national fraternity revoked the chapter's charter, and the chapter house was vacant. On January 1, 1995, an arsonist set fire to the house and essentially destroyed the house. The chapter's alumni made significant donations to refurbish and restore the house in 1995 and 1996.

Around 2001, the fraternity sold its chapter house and property to a fraternity brother, Mike Cates, under the business name PCM Properties LLC. PCM which leased the house to the undergraduates of the fraternity for twenty years. PCM prepared a new contract that increased the rent for the property in the fall 2020 semester at a time when the fraternity was still recovering financially from the COVID-19 pandemic. The chapter's alumni and the National Alpha Tau Omega HQ and National Board of Trustees advised the chapter not to the renew PCM contract. As a result, the fraternity stopped renting the property after the 2020–2021 academic year; the chapter house remained empty.

In 2021, PCM submitted a proposal to the city to demolish the chapter house to prepare the site for 51 student apartments, retail space, and a parking garage in a $12 to $15 million project. President of the Purdue ATO chapter, Kiernan McCormick, said, "The alumni that owned our home (Mike Cates, PPC Properties owner) decided it was time to do other things with the property. This decision was not shared by the chapter, the alumni, or the National Headquarters; however, it was out of our control legally." PMC stated that it wanted to end its relationship with the fraternity, in part, for disciplinary actions. The university sanctioned the fraternity for hazing and alcohol violations twice between 2019 and 2020.

The university did not support the redevelopment project, saying that it did not fit into its Master Plan. The West Lafayette Historical Preservation Commission also sent a letter indicating its desire to preserve the historic structure. However, the city's Area Plan Commission passed the proposal twelve to five in May 2021. The chapter house and project's fate was determined in October 2021 by the West Lafayette City Council, which voted eight to one against rezoning the property. City Council members indicated their support for saving the historic chapter house.

Students were living in the former fraternity house in 2023. In February 2023, PCM submitted an adaptive reuse plan for the chapter house. The West Lafayette Historical Preservation Commission approved the plan on May 1, 2023. Construction on the apartment project began in late June 2023. The house was developed into Revive 314 apartments.

== Architecture ==
Alpha Tau Omega Fraternity House was in Collegiate Gothic style designed by architect Robert Frost Daggett, an ATO member from the University of Pennsylvania chapter and member of the Indianapolis architectural firm R. P. Daggett & Co. Daggett was the first person from the state of Indiana to be admitted to the Ecole des Beaux-Arts in Paris, graduating from there in 1901.Alpha Tau Omega Fraternity House was built in 1920 by Allan V. Stackhouse, a Gamma Omicron chapter alumnus.

The chapter house is a 2 1/2-story, rectangular, Tudor Revival style brick and stone building. Alpha Tau Omega Fraternity House. It has a truncated hipped roof and a platform porch extending across the front facade. It has nine bays and a parapet tower to the south. The tower presents the tower on the Alpha Tau Omega crest. It originally had a slate roof and casement windows, all replaced in later renovations. However, the windows feature their original cut limestone facing. There is also a course of decorative limestone carvings above the entrance and around the tower.

The main entrance features a replica oak door with the original hinges, copper threshold, and wrought iron window grate. The chapter house's interior was in Tudor Gothic style, with stone floors, oak columns, gothic pointed doorways in oak, and a large Tudor arch limestone fireplace with an inglenook. The main level included a foyer, billiards room, dining room, and living room. The second and third floors included 26 bedrooms that could house one to four students each. The basement has a limestone fireplace in a room traditionally called the "bum room" by the fraternity.

A one-story kitchen addition was built in 1940, and a three-story and basement addition in 1963. The building was remodeled in 1995 after a fire on the second and third floors nearly destroyed the house. Alpha Tau Omega Fraternity House was listed on the National Register of Historic Places on March 20, 2002.

In June 2023, construction began to convert the chapter house into an apartment building for students, following the design of architect Berry Knechtel of KJG Architecture. The project included adding a four-story addition that included 80 apartments. The main section of the historic house was also significantly modified, turning it into small apartments and removing the wings which were not part of the original structure. In total, the new Revive 314 apartment building is expected to have 337 beds.

== See also ==
- North American fraternity and sorority housing
