= Old Alpha Tau Omega Fraternity House (Eugene, Oregon) =

Historic house in Oregon, United States

- U.S. National Register of Historic Places
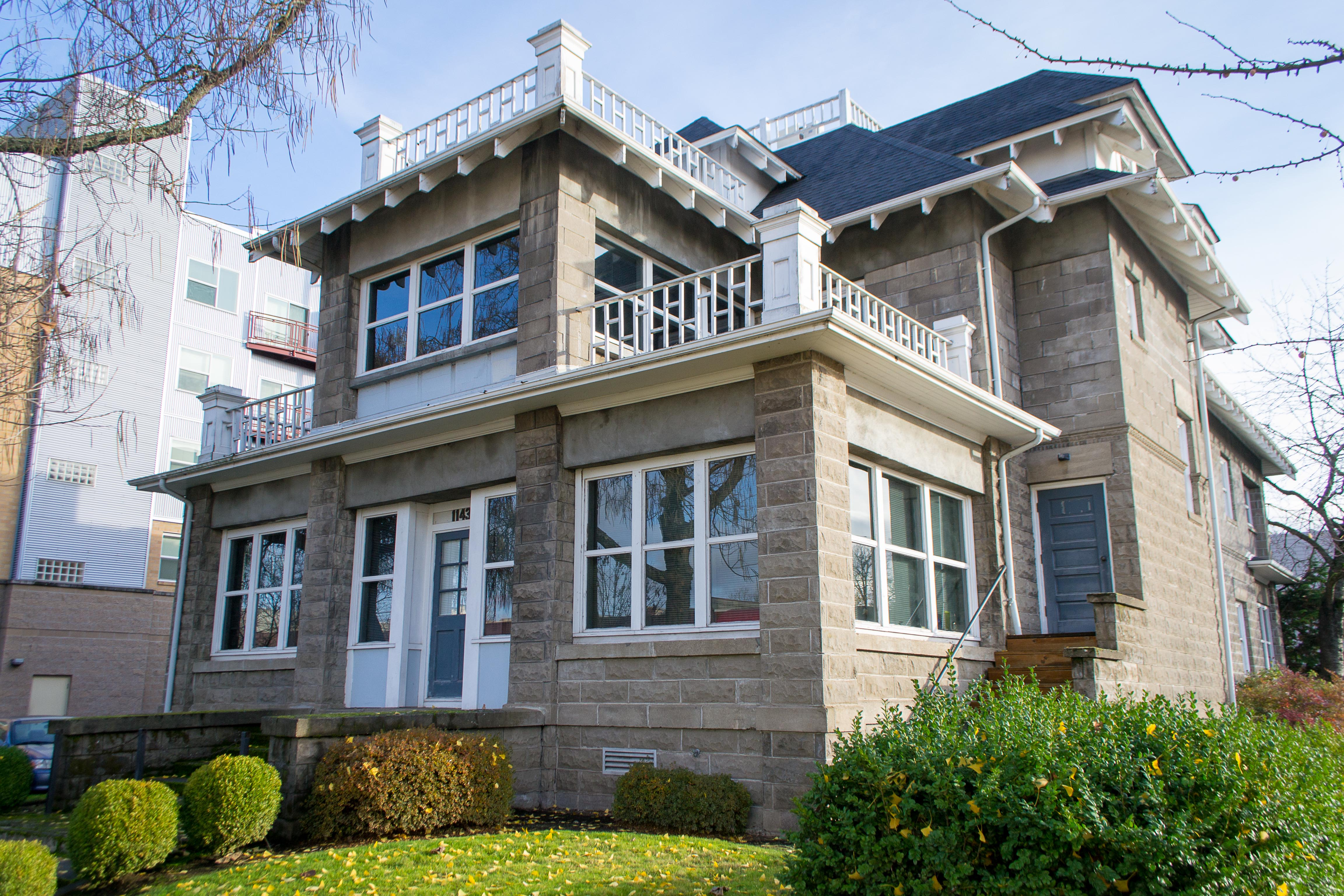
- Old ATO fraternity house, 2013
- Location: 1143 Oak Street; Eugene, Oregon
- Coordinates: 44°02′50″N 123°05′28″W
- Built: 1910
- Built by: George Lill
- Architectural style: American Craftsman
- NRHP reference No.: 83002158
- Added to NRHP: September 1, 1983

The Old Alpha Tau Omega Fraternity House is a historic residential structure in Eugene, Oregon. The 2.5-story building in the craftsman style completed in 1910. It was used by the Alpha Tau Omega fraternity at the University of Oregon from 1910 to 1922. The house was placed on the National Register of Historic Places in 1983.

== History ==
Blacksmith George Lill was the original owner and builder of the house at 1143 Oak Street in 1910.Alpha Tau Omega fraternity acquired the structure in 1910. It was the fourth fraternity to open at the University of Oregon. The fraternity occupied the house until 1922 when it constructed a new chapter house that was to the university.

Sue Dorris and Allie M. Smith converted the houses into apartments between 1922 and 1925. An antique store opened on its first floor in 1978. In 1978, its use was discontinued because of code violations and its illegal conversion into a retail store.

== Architecture ==
The Old Alpha Tau Omega Fraternity House is a 2.5-story building in the craftsman style. The wood-frame, hip roof building was constructed in 1910 by Eugene blacksmith George Lill and features seven varieties of decorative cement blocks applied to the exterior surface. Lill manufactured the blocks himself by a process meant to simulate fine ashlar stone masonry.

The house was placed on the National Register of Historic Places in 1983.

== See also ==
- National Register of Historic Places listings in Lane County, Oregon
- North American fraternity and sorority housing
