= Beta Theta Pi Fraternity House (Champaign, Illinois) =

- U.S. National Register of Historic Places
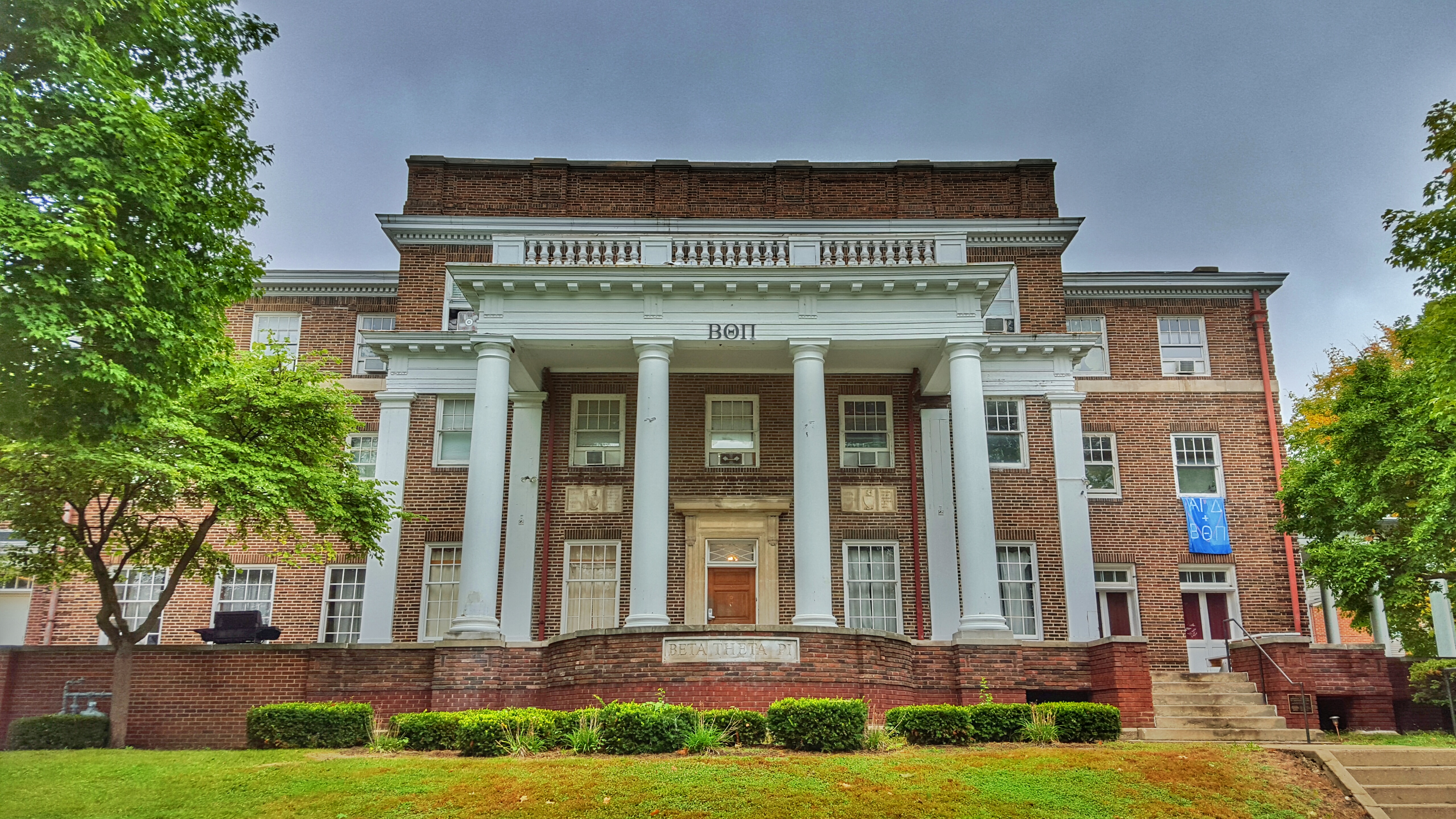
- Beta Theta Pi Fraternity House, 2003

- Location within Illinois Location within the United States
- Location: 202 E. Daniel St., Champaign, Illinois
- Coordinates: 40°6′29″N 88°14′9″W
- Area: less than one acre
- Built: 1912
- Built by: Almon W. Stoolman
- Architect: Frederick J. Klein
- Architectural style: Classical Revival
- MPS: Fraternity and Sorority Houses at the Urbana--Champaign Campus of the University of Illinois MPS
- NRHP reference No.: 89001108
- Added to NRHP: August 28, 1989

The Beta Theta Pi Fraternity House was a historic fraternity house located at the University of Illinois at Urbana–Champaign in Champaign, Illinois. The building was added to the National Register of Historic Places on August 28, 1989. It was demolished in October 2020.

== History ==
The Sigma Rho chapter of the Beta Theta Pi fraternity was chartered at the University of Illinois at Urbana–Champaign on February 28, 1902. It organized the previous year as a colony of the fraternity. The fraternity's first chapter house was located in the Stoltey House at 411 East John Street in Champaign in 1902. It moved to 209 East Green Street in Champaign for the 1902 to 1903 academic year.

Sigma Rho built a house at 305 East Green Street in Champaign for $9,000, moving into the building in the fall of 1903. However, in 1905, the fraternity purchased three lots on Daniel Street in Champaign with plans on building a larger chapter house. On December 18, 1911, the chapter held a groundbreaking ceremony for the construction of a new chapter house at it Daniel Street lots. The cost for the new chapter house was $35,000 ($1,209,375 in 2022 dollars).

The fraternity moved into the Beta Theta Pi Fraternity House at 202 East Daniel Street in August 1912. It held an opening dance on October 25, attended by members and alumni. The Beta Theta Pi Fraternity House established a new fraternity district to the west of the university campus, along with the Kappa Sigma Fraternity House. At the time, it was the largest fraternity house on campus. It was also one of the largest houses in Champaign.

The national fraternity disbanded the Sigma Rho chapter in December 2009. It was recolonized 2013 and reinstalled in April 2017, only to be suspended by the national fraternity in September 2017 for one year. However, on April 19, 2018, the national fraternity announced that was closing the chapter for risk management violations.

The chapter house was used by Beta Theta Pi until 2017. The national Sigma Rho Housing Corporation announced it was going to sell its former chapter house in March 2019. According to a former president of the housing corporation noted that the fraternity could not afford to maintain its historic chapter house.

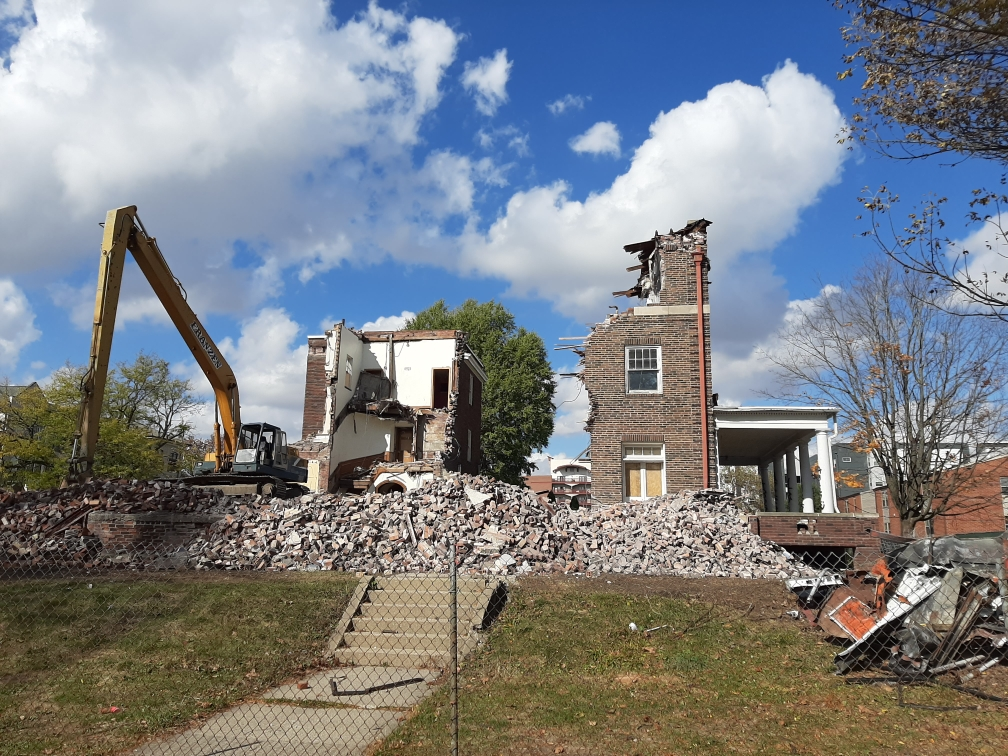
Beta Theta Pi Fraternity House being demolished on October 22, 2020

In May 2019, Landmarks Illinois placed Greek housing at the University of Illinois on its list of "12 Most Endangered Historic Places in Illinois", including the Beta Theta Pi Fraternity House. Part of the risk to the structure was the increase in its property value and the need for apartments for the university. The Beta Theta Pi Fraternity House was demolished in October 2020.

Beta Theta Pi returned to the University of Illinois as a colony in September 2021 and dedicated a non-residential facility in 2023.

== Architecture ==
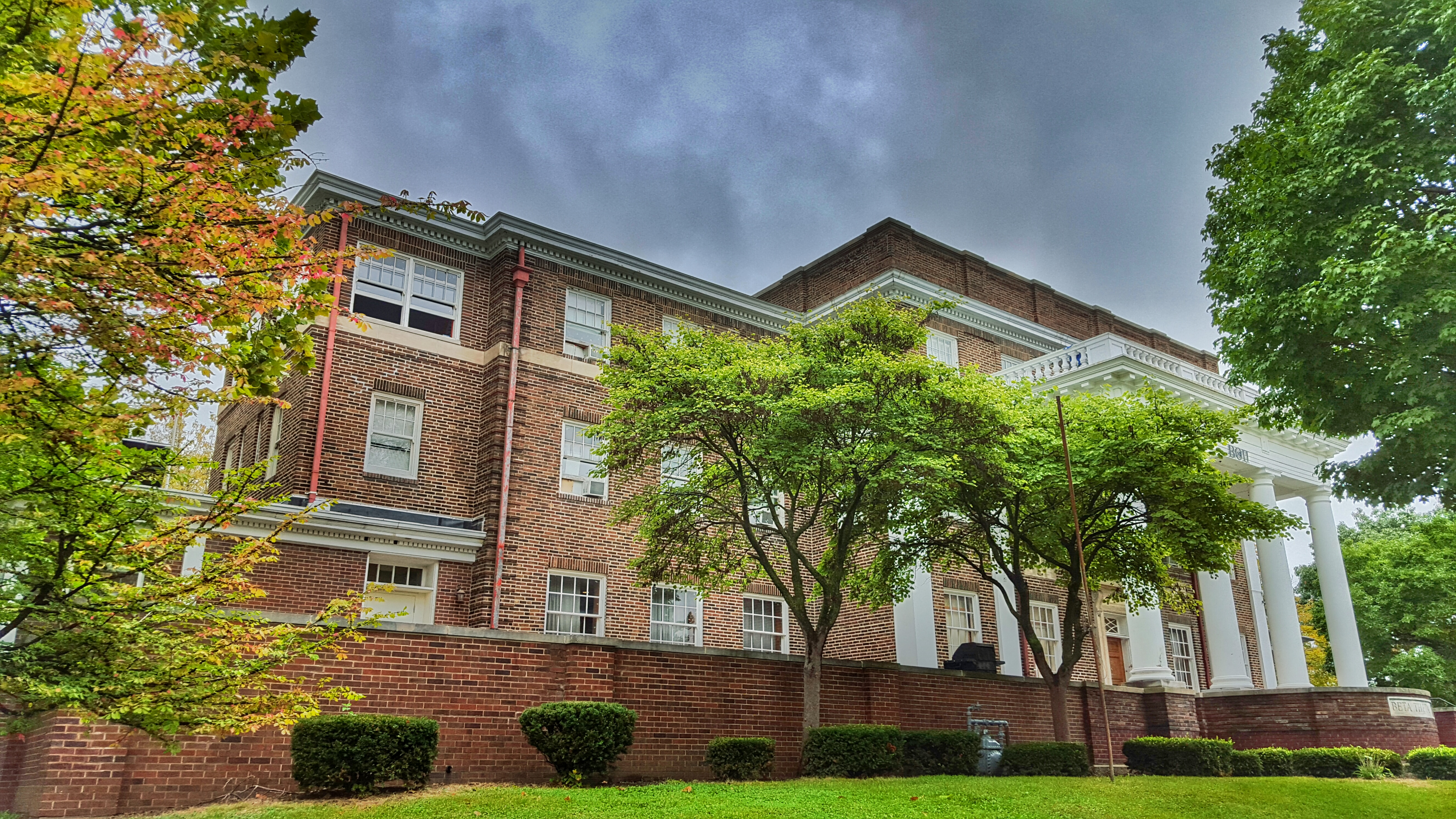
Beta Theta Pi Fraternity House, 2004

Frederick J. Klein, an architect from Peoria, designed the Beta Theta Pi Fraternity House in the Classical Revival style. Sigma Rho chapter member J. E. Henry of Louisville, Kentucky served as a consulting architect. Almon W. Stoolman of Champaign won the contract to build the chapter house. Its slate roof was installed by the Twin City Roofing and Sheet Metal Works. Professor Ralph E. Root planned the property's landscaping.

The three-story house was built of brick made by the Poston Brick & Concrete Co. of Springfield. The mortar between the bricks was scraped out about an inch, giving "the idea of a crag or rugged rock". It had a two-story front porch supported by four Tuscan columns and four pilasters and topped by a balcony. The fraternity members called the balcony "The Beach". Its first floor included a reception hall, a card room, a library, and a dining room. Its second floor included bedrooms and study rooms. Its third floor contained additional dormatory space. In total, it could house forty members. Modern equipment included electric lighting, hot and cold water in every suite, and bathrooms with showers, making it "a model fraternity house" and "one of the best fraternity houses in the country".

The chapter house was added to the National Register of Historic Places on August 28, 1989.

== See also ==
- North American fraternity and sorority housing
