= Alpha Delta Phi Fraternity House (Champaign, Illinois) =

- U.S. National Register of Historic Places
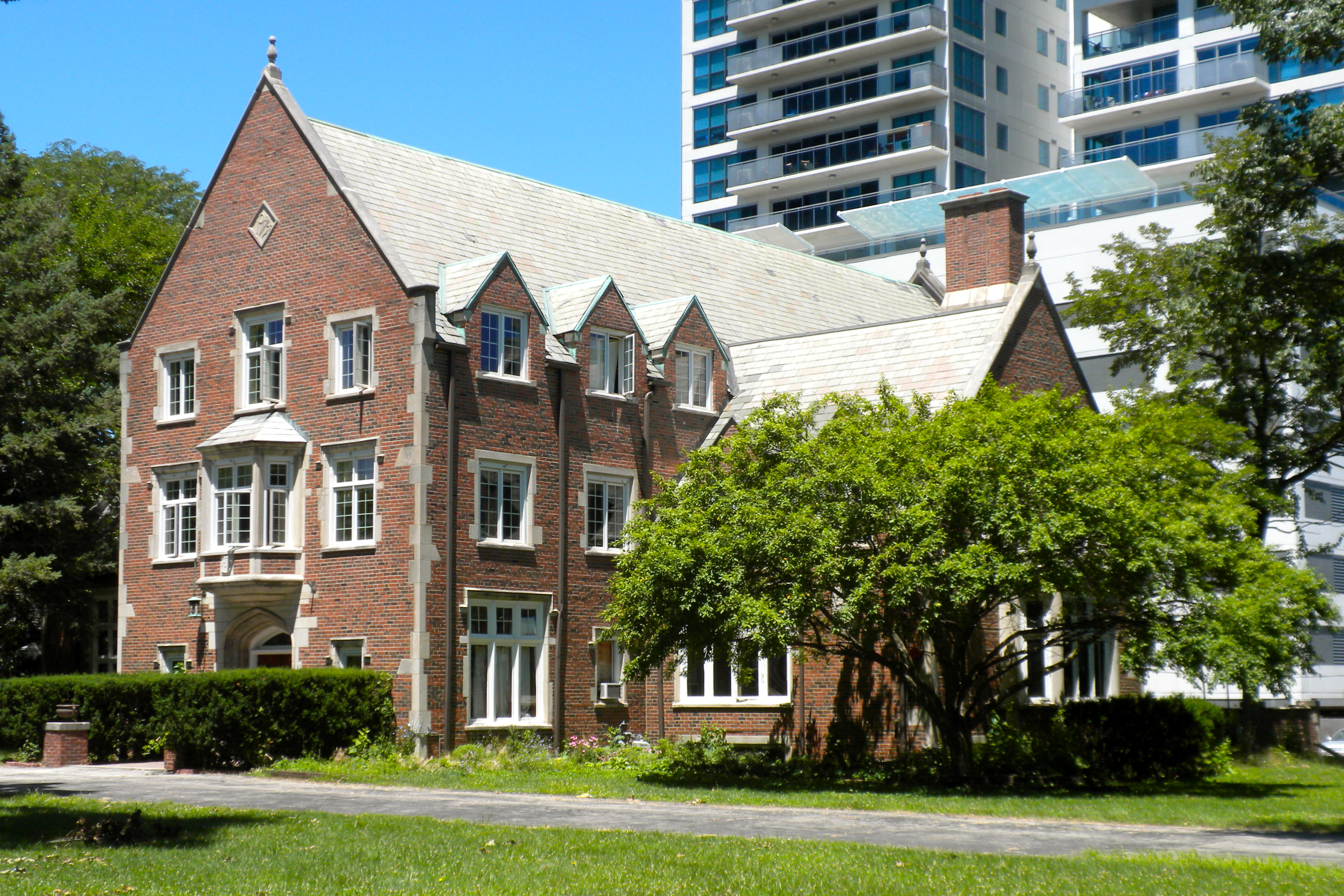

- Location within Illinois Location within the United States
- Location: 310 E. John St., Champaign, Illinois
- Coordinates: 40°6′33″N 88°14′2″W
- Area: less than one acre
- Built: 1925
- Architect: Varney, Ralph W.
- Architectural style: Tudor Revival
- MPS: Fraternity and Sorority Houses at the Urbana--Champaign Campus of the University of Illinois MPS
- NRHP reference No.: 90000752
- Added to NRHP: May 21, 1990

The Alpha Delta Phi Fraternity House was a historic fraternity house located at the University of Illinois at Urbana–Champaign in Champaign, Illinois. The house was built from 1924 to 1925 for the university's chapter of the Alpha Delta Phi fraternity, which formed in 1903.

During its early years, the fraternity's members included several prominent university athletes. Architect Ralph W. Varney designed the building in the Tudor Revival style. The house's design reflected the formal Jacobethan subtype of Tudor Revival architecture, which could be seen in its extensive stone decorations on its brick exterior, such as quoins and oriels, and its steep gable roof with gabled dormers. Half-timbering, a common feature of informal Tudor Revival designs, was notably absent.

The building was added to the National Register of Historic Places on May 21, 1990. By 2015, the chapter house was empty and the fraternity planned to build a new structure. The building was demolished in January 2018 to make room for an apartment building.

== See also ==
- Alpha Delta Phi
- North American fraternity and sorority housing
