= Delta Upsilon Chapter House =

- U.S. National Register of Historic Places
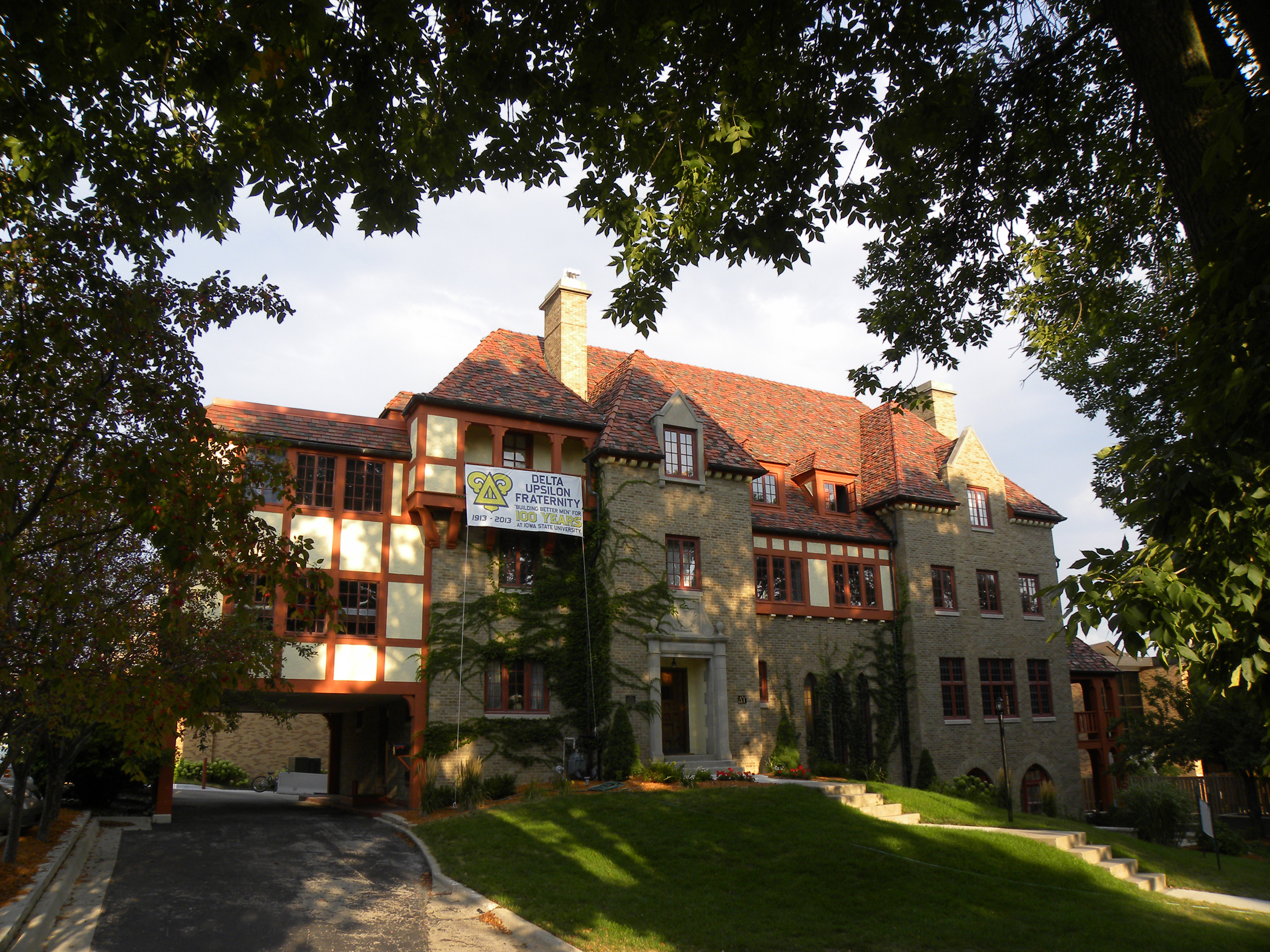

- Location within Iowa Location within the United States
- Location: 117 Ash Ave. Ames, Iowa
- Coordinates: 42°01′19.3″N 93°38′41.5″W
- Area: less than one acre
- Built: 1930
- Architect: Alexander M. Linn
- Architectural style: Renaissance Revival
- NRHP reference No.: 10000919
- Added to NRHP: November 10, 2010

Delta Upsilon Chapter House is a historic building located in Ames, Iowa, United States. It is considered one of the more imposing architectural examples among fraternity chapter houses at Iowa State University.

It was designed by Des Moines architect Alexander M. Linn, who joined Delta Upsilon at what was then called Iowa State College. The fraternity's chapter house was on Hyland Avenue at that time. Completed in 1930, the 2½-story, French Renaissance-style building features brick and half-timbering wall surfaces, and a complex roof system that includes steep pitches and polychrome slate.

It was listed on the National Register of Historic Places in 2010.

== See also ==
- North American fraternity and sorority housing
