= Delta Upsilon Fraternity House (Ann Arbor, Michigan) =

- U.S. National Register of Historic Places
- Michigan State Historic Site
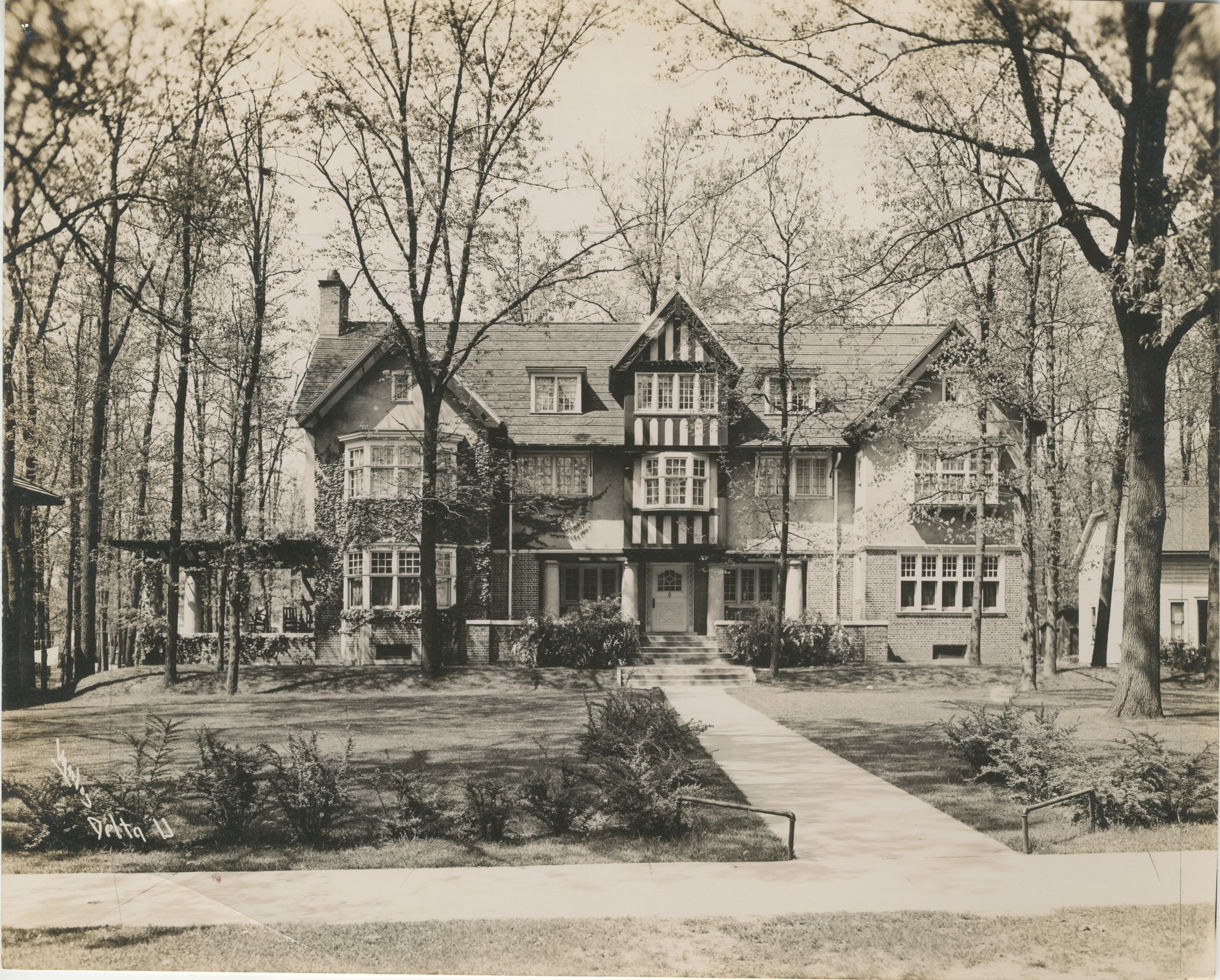
- Early 1900s image
- Interactive map
- Location: 1331 Hill St., Ann Arbor, Michigan
- Coordinates: 42°16′20″N 83°43′56″W
- Area: less than one acre
- Built: 1902
- Architect: Albert Kahn
- Architectural style: Tudor Revival
- NRHP reference No.: 95001394
- Added to NRHP: November 29, 1995

The Delta Upsilon Fraternity House is a fraternity house located at 1331 Hill Street in Ann Arbor, Michigan. It was listed on the National Register of Historic Places in 1995.

== History ==
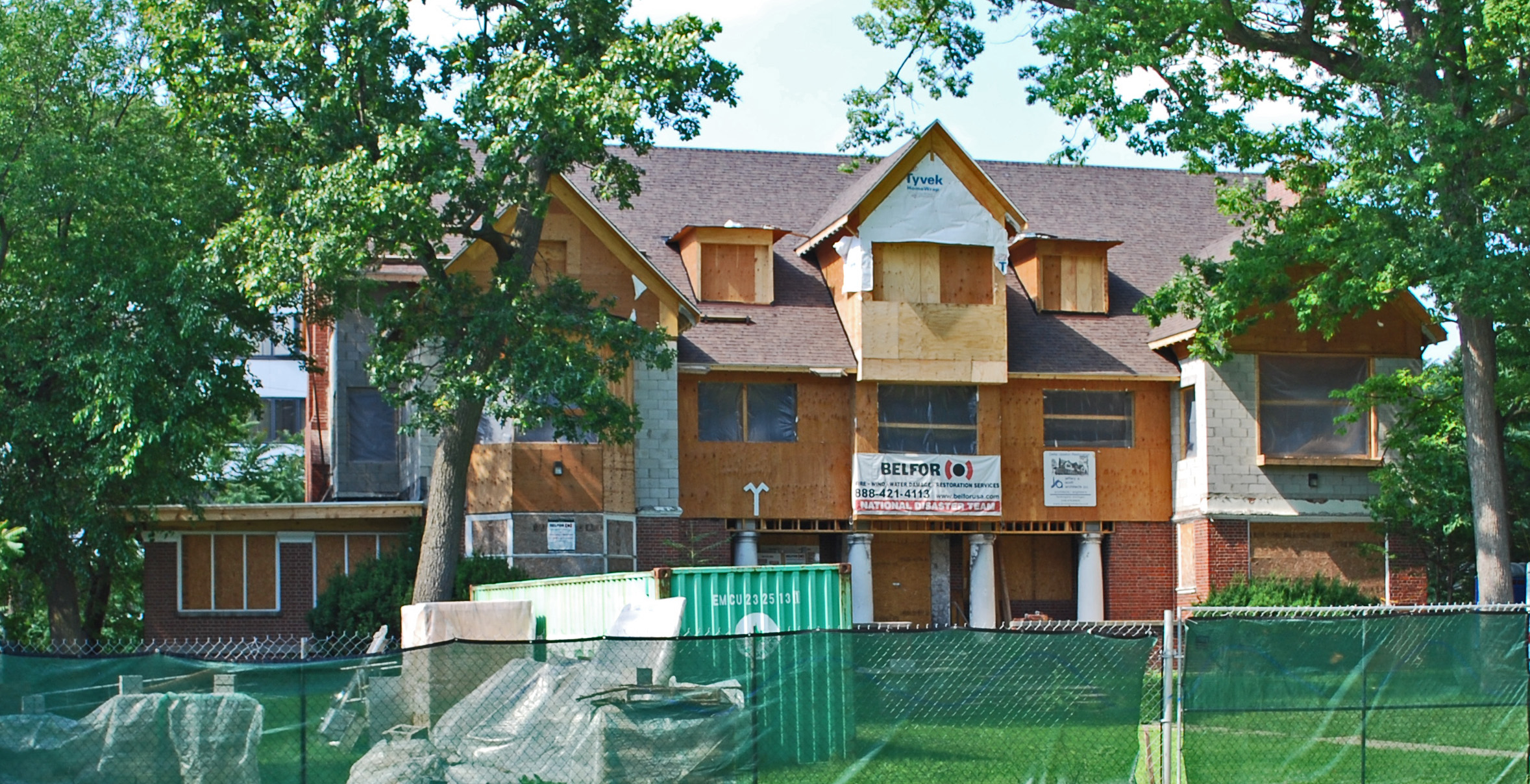
House during reconstruction

Delta Upsilon was founded in 1834 at Williams College in Williamstown, Massachusetts. The chapter at the University of Michigan was founded in 1874. By the early 1900s, the chapter needed a new house. Alumni pooled donations, and the chapter hired Detroit architect Albert Kahn to design this new house.

Construction began in 1902, and was completed in 1903. Delta Upsilon was the first fraternity to move to this part of Ann Arbor, but many other fraternities and sororities followed. The fraternity has continuously occupied the house since its construction, and it is the oldest fraternity house in Ann Arbor still being used by the organization that built it. It is also one of the earliest surviving examples of Kahn's non-industrial, non-commercial designs.

In 2008, a fire gutted the building. It was restored at a cost of nearly $6 million and re-opened in 2012.

== Description ==
The Delta Upsilon Fraternity House is a 2 1/2-story side-gable Tudor Revival building clad with Arts and Crafts influences. The first story is clad in brick and the second in stucco with half-timbered and shingled accents. The front facade is symmetric, with a shallow E-shaped plan with a narrow, three-story, front-gable projection in the center and a slightly projecting front-gable wing at each end. The center entry is through a recessed portico supported by four round columns. Windows are both casement and double-hung styles grouped in units of two, three, and four. The roof is clad with slate, with shed dormers containing paired casement windows.

On the interior is a wide entrance hall flanked by a dining room and kitchen on one side and a living room and sun room on the other. A stairway leads to the second floor and the attic, both of which have center halls and living quarters off each side.

== See also ==
- North American fraternity and sorority housing
