= Sigma Alpha Epsilon Fraternity House (Champaign, Illinois) =

- U.S. National Register of Historic Places
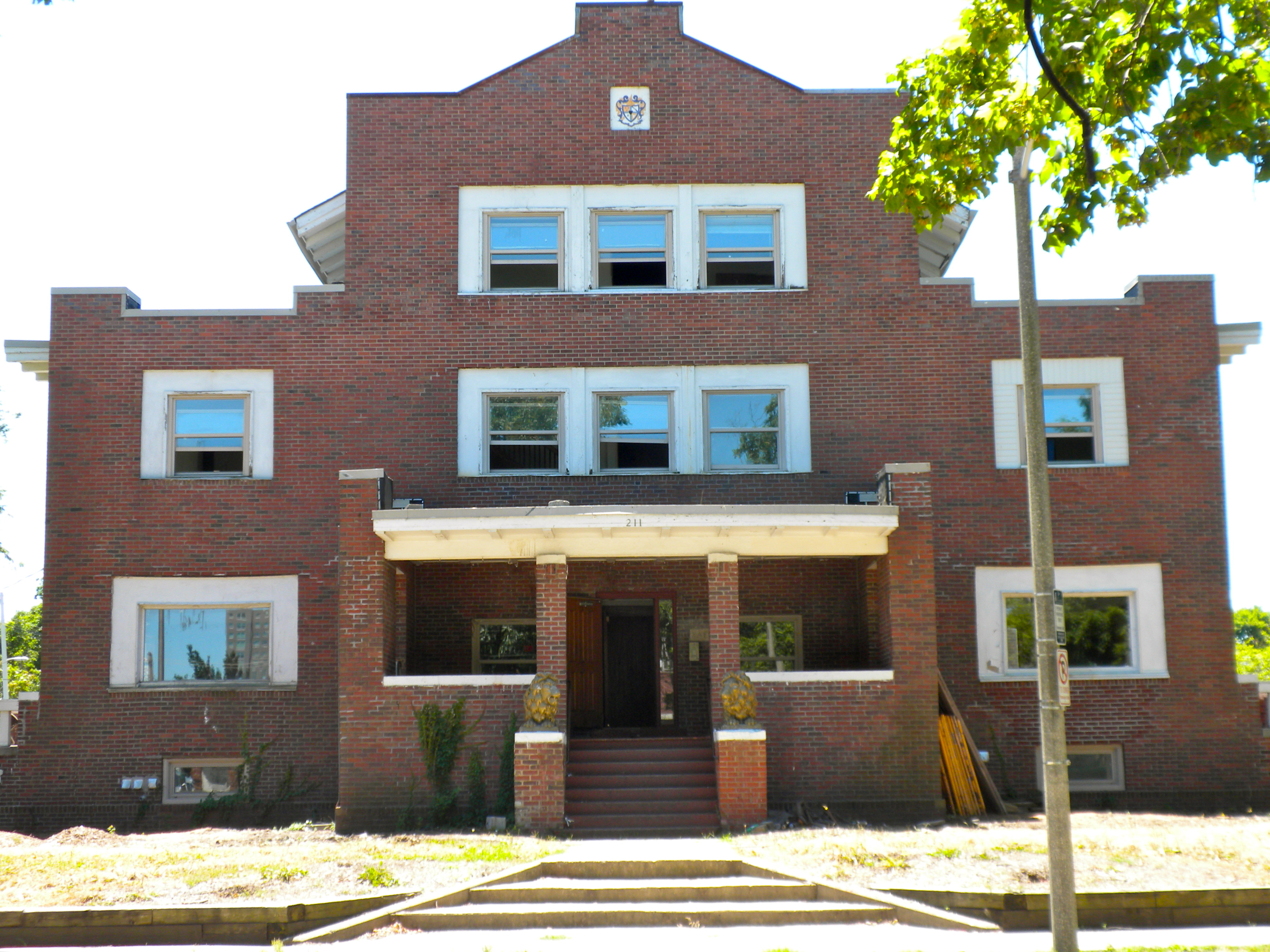

- Location within Illinois Location within the United States
- Location: 211 E. Daniel St., Champaign, Illinois
- Coordinates: 40°6′28″N 88°14′8″W
- Area: less than one acre
- Built: 1907
- Built by: A.W. Stoolman
- Architect: George Dean, Albert Dean
- Architectural style: Prairie School, American Craftsman
- MPS: Fraternity and Sorority Houses at the Urbana--Champaign Campus of the University of Illinois MPS
- NRHP reference No.: 90000113
- Added to NRHP: February 22, 1990

The Sigma Alpha Epsilon Fraternity House is a historic fraternity house located at the University of Illinois at Urbana–Champaign in Champaign, Illinois.

The house was built in 1907 for the Illinois Beta chapter of the Sigma Alpha Epsilon fraternity. Founded in 1899, Sigma Alpha Epsilon was one of the oldest fraternities at the university. Architects George and Albert Dean designed the house, which combines elements of the Prairie School and American Craftsman styles. It is the university's only fraternity house to incorporate either style. The building's horizontal features, limestone caps and trim, and tall piers extending above the porch roof are characteristic Prairie School elements, while its exposed rafters and gable roof are inspired by Craftsman designs.

The building was added to the National Register of Historic Places on February 22, 1990.

== See also ==
- North American fraternity and sorority housing
