= List of City of Champaign local landmarks =

List of local historic sites in Champaign, Illinois

Historic Landmarks and Districts is a designation of the City of Champaign Historic Preservation Commission (HPC). Many of these landmarks are also listed on the National Register of Historic Places.

== Historic Preservation Commission ==
The City of Champaign's Historic Preservation Commission (HPC) approves new historic districts and landmarks and ensures historic site maintain their character. The Historic Preservation Commission was authorized by Sec. 37-481.

=== Criteria ===
To submit a landmark or district for historic designation, applicants must provide a narrative demonstrating how the proposed landmark meets criteria in Sec. 37-491 of the Historic Preservation Ordinance.

The Commission shall, upon receipt of an application and after conducting an investigation, make a preliminary determination as to whether a property, structure, improvement, or area meets one or more of the following criteria:

(a) Significant value as part of the historical, cultural, artistic, social, ethnic, or other heritage of the nation, state or community.

(b) Associated with an important person or event in national, state or local history.

(c) Representative of the distinguishing characteristics of an architectural type inherently valuable for the study of a period, style, craftsmanship, method of construction, or use of indigenous materials.

(d) Notable work of a master builder, designer, architect, or artist whose individual genius has influenced an era.

(e) Identifiable as an established and familiar visual feature in the community owing to its unique location or physical characteristics.

(f) One of the few remaining examples of a particular architectural style or use or is an example which clearly represents a major architectural style and has undergone little or no alteration since its construction.

(g) A property, structure, improvement or area that is less than fifty (50) years old shall not be considered for landmark designation unless it is of exceptional importance in any of the areas described in the criteria above.

== List of landmarks ==
=== Individual landmarks ===
Landmark Name	Image	Location	Built	Style	NRHP date
Atkinson Monument Building Precision Graphics		106-108 S Neil Street	1904	Richardsonian Romanesque	N/A
Champaign City Building		102 N Neil Street	1937	Art Deco	N/A
Dunning - Marks Residence		1018 W Church Street	1906	Neoclassical	N/A
Former Coca-Cola Bottling Plant (Papa Del's Pizza Factory)		1201 S Neil Street	1938	Art Deco	N/A
Graphic Press Building		203-205 N Market Street	1870	Italianate Commercial Style	November 7, 1997
Harwood-Solon Residence		503 S State Street	1867	Italianate (Tuscan Villa)	July 3, 2007
Henry Ahrens Residence (Divan Wojnar Residence)		212 E University Avenue	1893	Queen Anne	November 22, 2011
Inter-Urban Trolley Barn (Surface 51)		804 N Neil Street	c. 1894–1909	Railroad Vernacular	
Lincoln Building		44 E Main Street	1916	Classical Revival detailing	August 1, 1996
Mattis Residence (Health & Vaughn Funeral Home)		201 N Elm Street	1883	Queen Anne	
Orpheum Theater (RKO Orpheum Theatre)		346-352 N Neil Street	1914	Classical Revival exterior; French Renaissance interior	February 28, 1991
Park Theater (Art Theater Co-Op)		126-128 W Church Street	1913	Classical Revival	
Phi Delta Theta		309 E Chalmers Street	1922	Tudor Revival	February 25, 2004
Prayer for Rain Statue		West Side Park	1899		
Rick Orr Florist Building		122 N Walnut Street	ca. 1887–1890	Romanesque Revival	
Salem Baptist Church		500 E Park Street	1908	Romanesque Revival	
Solon Building		201 N Market Street	1870	Italianate Commercial Style	November 7, 1997
Stone Arch Bridge		NW Corner of Springfield Avenue and Second Street	1860		May 14, 1981
The Cambridge		805-807 W Church Street	1923-1924	Tudor Revival	
The Georgian		1005 S Sixth Street	1925	Georgian Revival	November 15, 2005
The Greystone		107 S Wright Street	1924	Vernacular (Romanesque Influences)	
The Parkview		305 W University Avenue	1925	Tudor Revival	
Thomas Franks Residence		704 N Randolph Street	1872	Vernacular (T-Plan with Queen Anne detailing)	
Trevett Residence (Owens Funeral Home)		101 N Elm Street	1900	Georgian Revival	
U.S. Post Office (Springer Cultural Center)		301 N Randolph Street	1905	Neoclassical, Beaux Arts	August 17, 1976
Virginia Theater		203 W Park Street	1921	Italian Renaissance Revival, Spanish Revival	November 28, 2003
Wee Haven		1509 W Park Avenue	1925	Prairie School	December 15, 2011
West Side Park					
Women's Town Club (Buzzard Organ Factory)		112 W Hill Street	1897	Richardsonian Romanesque	

=== Historic Districts ===
==== National Historic Districts ====
- Downtown Commercial District

==== Local Historic Districts ====
- Illinois Central Railroad Historic District
- Villard Court Historic District

== See also ==
- List of City of Urbana Local Historic Landmarks and Districts
- National Register of Historic Places listings in Champaign County, Illinois
