= Lists of locally designated landmarks in the United States =

Landmarks officially designated by local city or county governments in the United States.

== Alabama ==
- Alabama Register of Landmarks and Heritage
  - Properties on the Alabama Register of Landmarks and Heritage by county (Autauga–Choctaw)
  - Properties on the Alabama Register of Landmarks and Heritage by county (Clarke–Dallas)
  - Properties on the Alabama Register of Landmarks and Heritage by county (DeKalb–Jackson)
  - Properties on the Alabama Register of Landmarks and Heritage by county (Jefferson–Macon)
  - Properties on the Alabama Register of Landmarks and Heritage by county (Madison–Perry)
  - Properties on the Alabama Register of Landmarks and Heritage by county (Pickens–Winston)

== Arizona ==
- List of historic properties in Agua Caliente, Arizona
- List of historic properties in Avondale, Arizona
- List of historic properties in Benson, Arizona
- List of historic properties in Bisbee, Arizona
- List of historic properties in Black Canyon City, Arizona
- List of historic properties in Bouse, Arizona
- List of historic properties in Buckeye, Arizona
- List of historic properties in Camp Verde, Arizona
- List of historic properties in Casa Grande, Arizona
- List of historic properties in Cave Creek, Arizona
- List of historic properties in Chandler, Arizona
- List of historic properties in Clarkdale, Arizona
- List of historic properties in Clifton, Arizona
- List of historic properties in Cottonwood, Arizona
- List of historic properties in Dateland, Arizona
- List of historic properties in Douglas, Arizona
- List of historic properties in Duncan, Arizona
- List of historic properties in Flagstaff, Arizona
- List of historic properties in Florence, Arizona
- List of historic structures in Gilbert, Arizona
- List of historic properties in Glendale, Arizona
- List of historic properties in Globe, Arizona
- List of historic properties in Goldfield, Arizona
- List of historic properties in Holbrook, Arizona
- List of historic properties in Jerome, Arizona
- List of historic properties in Kingman, Arizona
- List of historic properties in Mayer, Arizona
- List of historic properties in Mesa, Arizona
- List of historic properties in Miami, Arizona
- List of historic properties in New River, Arizona
- List of historic properties in Nogales, Arizona
- List of historic structures in Oatman, Arizona
- List of historic properties in Oracle, Arizona
- List of historic properties in Paradise Valley, Arizona
- List of historic properties in Parker, Arizona
- List of historic properties in Patagonia, Arizona
- List of historic properties in Pearce, Arizona
- List of historic properties in Peoria, Arizona
- List of historic properties in Phoenix
- List of historic properties in Pine-Strawberry, Arizona
- List of historic properties in Prescott, Arizona
- List of historic properties in Quartzsite, Arizona
- List of historic properties in Queen Creek, Arizona
- List of historic properties in Safford, Arizona
- List of historic properties in Scottsdale, Arizona
- List of historic properties in Sedona, Arizona
- List of historic properties in Snowflake, Arizona
- List of historic properties in Superior, Arizona
- List of historic properties in Tempe, Arizona
- List of historic properties in Tombstone, Arizona
- List of historic properties in Tucson, Arizona
- List of historic properties in Two Guns, Arizona
- List of historic properties in Wickenburg, Arizona
- List of historic properties in Willcox, Arizona
- List of historic properties in Williams, Arizona
- List of historic properties in Winslow, Arizona
- List of historic properties in Yuma, Arizona

== California ==
- Bakersfield: Bakersfield Register of Historic Places and Areas of Historic Interest
- Berkeley: List of Berkeley Landmarks in Berkeley, California
- Glendale: Glendale Register of Historic Resources and Historic Districts
- Long Beach: List of City of Long Beach historic landmarks
- Los Angeles: Los Angeles Historic-Cultural Monuments
  - List of Los Angeles Historic-Cultural Monuments in Downtown Los Angeles
  - List of Los Angeles Historic-Cultural Monuments on the East and Northeast Sides
  - List of Los Angeles Historic-Cultural Monuments in the Harbor area
  - List of Los Angeles Historic-Cultural Monuments in Hollywood
  - List of Los Angeles Historic-Cultural Monuments in the San Fernando Valley
  - List of Los Angeles Historic-Cultural Monuments in Silver Lake, Angelino Heights, and Echo Park
  - List of Los Angeles Historic-Cultural Monuments in South Los Angeles
  - List of Los Angeles Historic-Cultural Monuments on the Westside
  - List of Los Angeles Historic-Cultural Monuments in the Wilshire and Westlake areas
- Oakland: List of Oakland Designated Landmarks
- Riverside: List of landmarks in Riverside, California
- San Francisco: List of San Francisco Designated Landmarks
- San Diego: List of San Diego Historic Landmarks
  - List of San Diego Historical Landmarks in La Jolla
  - List of San Diego Historic Landmarks in the Point Loma and Ocean Beach areas
- San Luis Obispo: City of San Luis Obispo Historic Resources
- Santa Barbara: City of Santa Barbara Historic Landmarks
- Santa Monica: List of City of Santa Monica Designated Historic Landmarks
- Ventura: City of Ventura Historic Landmarks and Districts
- Ventura County: Ventura County Historic Landmarks & Points of Interest
- List of California State Historic Parks

== Colorado ==
- List of Denver landmarks

== Florida ==
- List of historic sites in Sarasota, Florida

== Georgia ==
- List of historic buildings and districts designated by the City of Atlanta

== Illinois ==
- List of Chicago Landmarks
- List of City of Champaign Local Landmarks
- List of City of Danville Historic Landmarks
- List of City of Edwardsville Register of Historic Landmarks
- List of Town of Normal Local Landmark Properties and Districts
- List of City of Peoria Historic Landmarks and Districts
- List of City of Rockford Landmarks and Historic-Districts
- List of City of Springfield Historic Sites
- List of City of Urbana Local Historic Landmarks and Districts

== Iowa ==
- Davenport Register of Historic Properties

== Maryland ==
- Baltimore City Landmarks

== Massachusetts ==
- Historic places in Framingham, Massachusetts

== Michigan ==
- List of Michigan State Historic Sites
  - Category: Lists of Michigan State Historic Sites by county

== Minnesota ==
- List of City of Minneapolis designated landmarks

== Missouri ==
- List of landmarks of St. Louis

== Nebraska ==
- List of Omaha landmarks

== Nevada ==
- List of Las Vegas landmarks

== New Mexico ==
- List of historic landmarks in Albuquerque, New Mexico

== New York ==
- List of New York City Landmarks
- List of Town of Oyster Bay Landmarks

== Ohio ==
- List of Cincinnati Local Historic Landmarks
- Columbus Register of Historic Properties

== Pennsylvania ==
- Philadelphia Register of Historic Places
- List of City of Pittsburgh historic designations

== Texas ==
- List of Dallas Landmarks

== Washington ==
- List of landmarks in King County, Washington
- List of Seattle landmarks

== Washington D.C. ==
- District of Columbia Inventory of Historic Sites

== Wisconsin ==
- List of Milwaukee landmarks

== Commonwealths and territories ==
- Guam Historic Register Listing

== See also ==
Federal designations

- National Natural Landmark
- National Register of Historic Places
  - National Historic Landmarks
  - National Historic Sites
  - National Military Parks
  - National Memorials
  - National Monuments

State Registries

- List of heritage registers
- Alabama Register of Landmarks and Heritage
- Arkansas Register of Historic Places
- California Historical Landmarks
- Hawaiʻi Register of Historic Places
- List of Illinois State Historic Sites
- Indiana Register of Historic Sites and Structures
- List of Louisiana state historic sites
- List of Michigan State Historic Sites
- List of Mississippi Landmarks
- List of Nevada historical markers
- New Jersey Register of Historic Places
- New Mexico State Register of Cultural Properties
- List of New York (state) historic sites
- Protected areas of North Carolina (section State Historic Sites)
- List of Texas State Historic Sites
- List of Vermont State Historic Sites
- Virginia Historic Landmark
- Washington State Heritage Register
