= Lincoln Building =

Lincoln Building may refer to:

- Lincoln Building (42nd Street, Manhattan)
- Lincoln Building (Union Square, Manhattan), listed on the NRHP
- Lincoln Building (Carrington, North Dakota), listed on the NRHP
- Lincoln Building (Champaign, Illinois), listed on the NRHP
- Lincoln Building (Little Rock, Arkansas), listed on the NRHP
