= List of City of Urbana Local Historic Landmarks and Districts =

List of local historic sites in Urbana, Illinois

Historic Landmarks and Districts is a designation of the City of Urbana Historic Preservation Commission (HPC). Many of these landmarks are also listed on the National Register of Historic Places. The City of Urbana has 18 local historic landmarks and 3 local historic districts.

== Historic Preservation Commission ==
The City of Urbana's Historic Preservation Commission (HPC) approves new historic districts and landmarks. The Historic Preservation Commission was established in 1998.

=== Individual landmarks ===
Landmark Name	Image	Location	Built	Designation date	NRHP date
The Bills House		508 West Elm Street	1889	October 2008	
Busey's Hall Princess Theater		120 - 124 West Main Street	1870 Facade 1934	Feb-2000	
Ezekiel Boyden Home		404 West Illinois Street	1850	Apr-2011	
Colvin House		604 West Pennsylvania Avenue	1922	June 2011	
DeWolf Residence		601 West Delaware Avenue	1933	May-2016	
Freeman House		504 West Elm Street	1902	Jun-2007	
Gothic Revival Cottage		108 North Webber Street	c 1850s	Feb-2000	
Halberstadt House		104 North Central Avenue	1875	Oct-2011	
Hieronymus House		702 West Pennsylvania Avenue	1919	May-2016	
Lindley House		312 West Green Street	1895	Feb-2000	
Nathan Ricker House		612 West Green Street	1892	Feb-2000	June 21, 2000
Reed-Sutton House		1207 South Busey Avenue		Jun-2013	
Richards-Latowsky House		305 West High Street	1911	Sep-2008	
Smith-Russell House		801 West Indiana Avenue	1920	Jan-2013	
Sutton House		502 West Elm Street	1889	Jun-2007	
Tiernan's Block/Masonic Temple		115 West Main Street	1871 Facade 1914	Feb-2000	
Urbana-Lincoln Hotel		209 South Broadway Avenue	1924	Dec-2010	September 8, 2006
Zeta Tau Alpha Sorority House		1404 South Lincoln Ave (originally 808 W Vermont Avenue)	1928	Jan-2015	

=== Historic Districts ===
==== National Historic Districts ====
- Downtown Urbana Historic District
- Elm Street Court
- University of Illinois Experimental Dairy Farm Historic District

==== Local Historic Districts ====
- Buena Vista Court Historic District
- Joseph Royer Historic District
- West Main Street Historic District

== See also ==
- List of City of Champaign Local Landmarks
- National Register of Historic Places listings in Champaign County, Illinois
