= Nathan C. Ricker House =

Historic house in Illinois, United States

- U.S. National Register of Historic Places
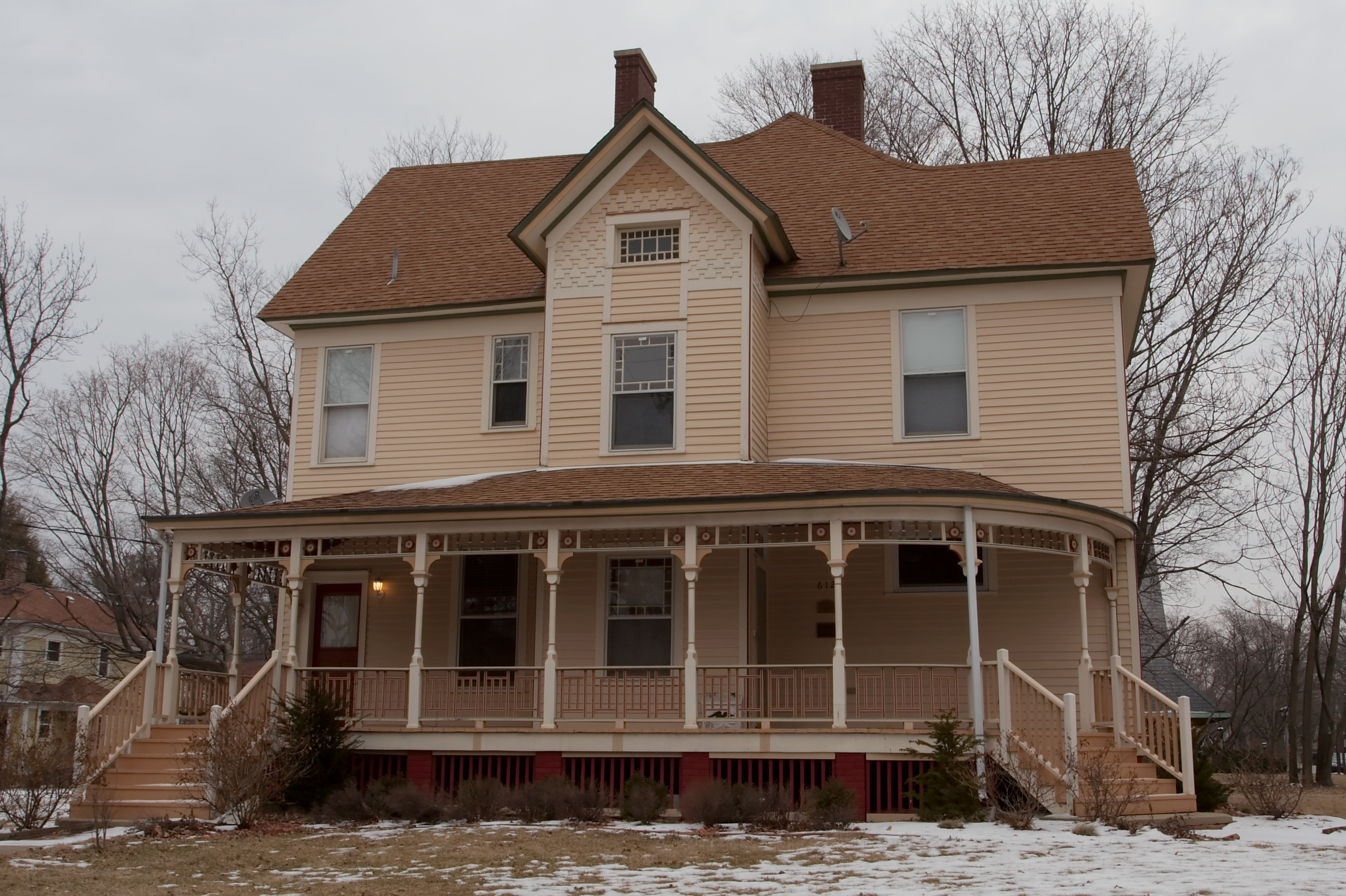

- Location within Illinois Location within the United States
- Location: 612 W. Green St., Urbana, Illinois
- Coordinates: 40°6′39″N 88°12′57″W
- Area: less than one acre
- Built: 1892
- Architect: Ricker, Nathan C.
- Architectural style: Queen Anne
- NRHP reference No.: 00000682
- Added to NRHP: June 21, 2000

The Nathan C. Ricker House is a historic house located at 612 West Green Street in Urbana, Illinois. Architect Nathan Clifford Ricker designed the house for himself in 1892; he lived there until his death in 1924. Ricker was a professor at the University of Illinois at Urbana–Champaign, and he established the university's architecture program; he also designed several of the school's buildings. His house, a two-story Queen Anne structure, was his only residential design. The house has an asymmetrical plan with a multi-component roof, projecting bays, and a front porch along the entire west side. Wood shingles decorate the house's exterior, and decorative posts, railings, and a frieze adorn the porch.

The house was added to the National Register of Historic Places on June 21, 2000.
