= List of historic structures in Gilbert, Arizona =

List of historic properties in Gilbert, Arizona
- Town
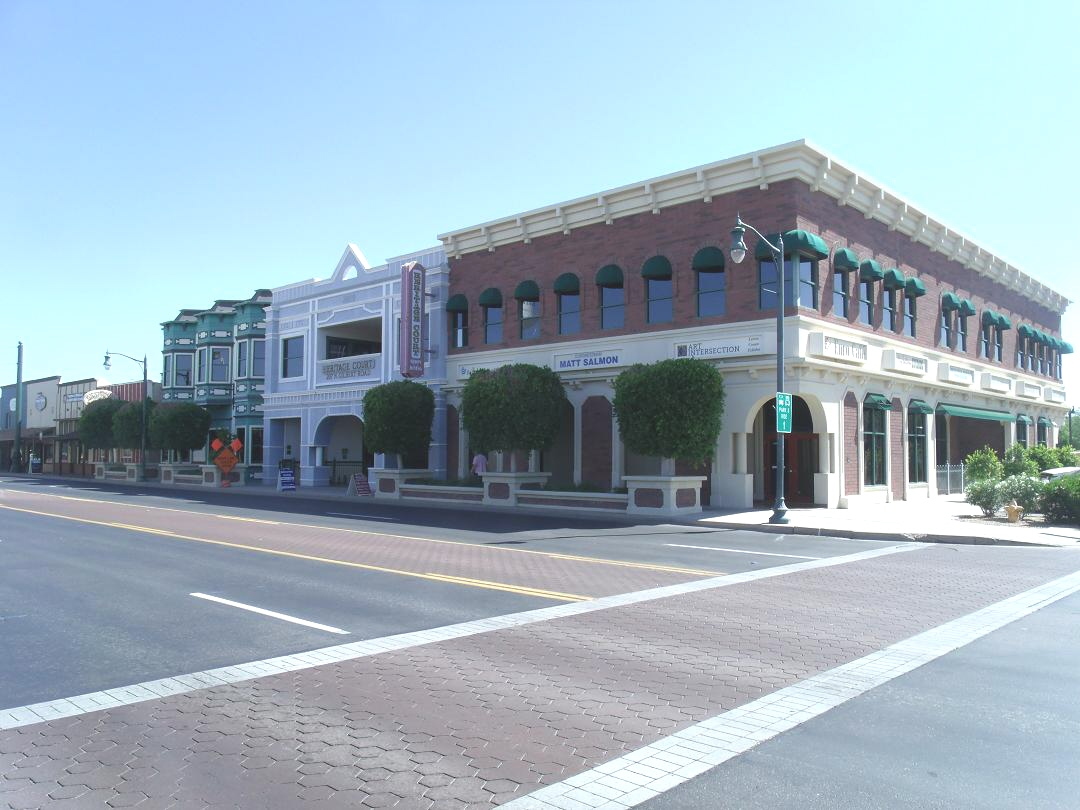
- Gilbert's Heritage Court as viewed from Gilbert Road

- Location of Gilbert in Arizona
- Coordinates: 33°21′10″N 111°47′20″W

This is a list, which includes a photographic gallery, of some of the remaining historic buildings in Gilbert, Maricopa, Arizona, United States, which was founded as a farming community. The town of Gilbert is located southeast of Phoenix within the city's metropolitan area. During World War 1, Gilbert was known as the "Hay Shipping Capital of the World". The Gilbert Elementary School which was built in 1913, and now houses the Gilbert Historical Museum, is listed in the National Register of Historic Places. Other structures are considered historical by the Gilbert Historical Society.

== Brief history ==
William Michael “Bobby” Gilbert was born on December 14, 1861, near Lexington, Kentucky. His mother Sally suffered from asthma and therefore in 1882, he and his family moved to Mesa, Arizona, believing that the subtropical, hot desert type of climate would benefit her. William and his father became very active in the real estate business in the East Valley and homesteaded 160 acres in the area.

The Phoenix and Eastern Railroad wanted to build a rail line from Phoenix to Kearny and the mining finds along the Gila River. On October 24, 1902, William sold the right-of-way across his homestead to the Phoenix and Eastern Railroad. Two months later, on December 14, 1902, the railroad company purchased an additional parcel in order to create a spur line parallel to the main line. The railroad company finished laying the line on the rectangular spur by 1903 and a depot was built which they named the Gilbert Depot. The local farmers used the depot to ship their produce. The first grocery store in Gilbert, named Ayer's Grocery Store, was established in 1910. The store also served as the first post office. The post office was moved various times until it was finally moved to 225 S Val Vista Dr. where it is currently located.

During World War 1, hay to feed the horses was very much in demand. Gilbert became known as the "Hay Capital of the World" until the late 1920s. The town of Gilbert was officially incorporated in 1920.

== Gilbert Historical Society & Museum ==
The Gilbert Historical Society & Museum is located within the original Gilbert Elementary School built in 1913 in the southern end of the Gilbert Heritage District at the southwest corner of Gilbert Rd. and Elliot Rd. The Gilbert Historical Society was established in 1960. The goal of the society is to "Preserve the Past for the Future."

== Historic structures ==
The following is a brief description of the historic structures which are pictured. One of these structures are listed in the National Register of Historic Places while others are located in Gilberts downtown Historic Heritage District and are listed as historical by the Gilbert Heritage District.

- Gilbert Elementary School was built in 1913. It is located at 10 S. Gilbert Rd. and now houses the Gilbert Historical Museum. It is listed in the National Register of Historic Places.
- Gilbert High School was built in 1920. It now houses the Gilbert Public School District Office. The structure is listed as historical by the Gilbert Heritage District.
- The Gilbert Water Tower was built in 1925. The structure is listed as historical by the Gilbert Heritage District.
- Gilbert's First Jail House was built in 1918 and later used as a pump house. The structure is listed as historical by the Gilbert Heritage District.
- The Tone Building was built in 1929 and now houses Joe's Real BBQ Restaurant. The structure is listed as historical by the Gilbert Heritage District.
- The Liberty Market Building was built in 1936. Liberty Market was established by the Ong family. The neon sign which is still on display was designed by Mae Ong, the wife of Ben Ong, who purchased the market in 1943. The structure is listed as historical by the Gilbert Heritage District.
- The Creed Building was built in 1918. It now houses the Farmhouse Restaurant. The structure is listed as historical by the Gilbert Heritage District.
- The Attaway Phelps-Blakely Building was built in 1910. It now houses the Norwood Furniture store. The structure is listed as historical by the Gilbert Heritage District.
- The Bank of Gilbert Building was built in 1917. It now houses an insurance company. The structure is listed as historical by the Gilbert Heritage District.
- The Clare's Metal Shop house was built in 1918. It now houses Bergies Coffee. The structure is listed as historical by the Gilbert Heritage District.
- Clement's Garage Building was built in 1934. The structure is listed as historical by the Gilbert Heritage District.
- The American Legion Post 39 building was built in 1934.
- The Higley General Store – The community of Higley was named after one of its early landowners, Stephen Weaver Higley, born May 3, 1857. The Higley General Store building was built in 1910, The brown structure pictured in the middle is a remodeled version of the original which still stands near the southwest corner of Higley Road and Williams Field Road and now houses various businesses. The first Post Office was in a back corner of the Higley Store. Listed as historical by the San Tan Historical Society.
Historic Gilbert Heritage District
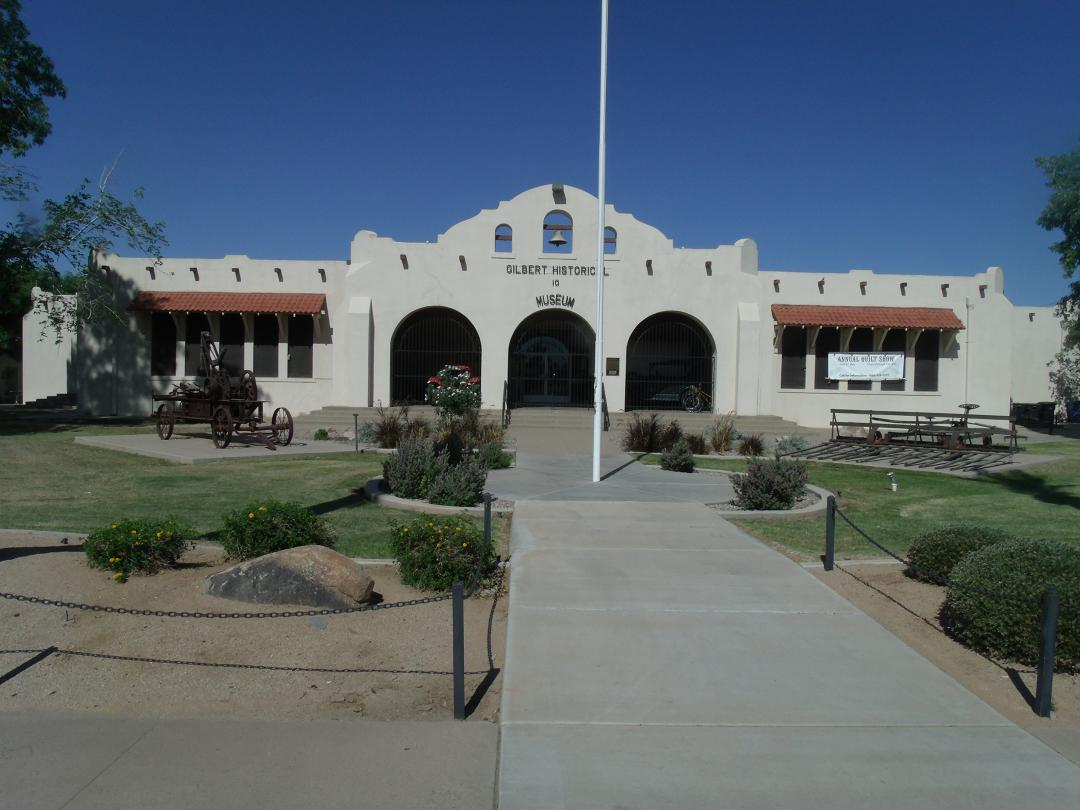
Gilbert Elementary School.

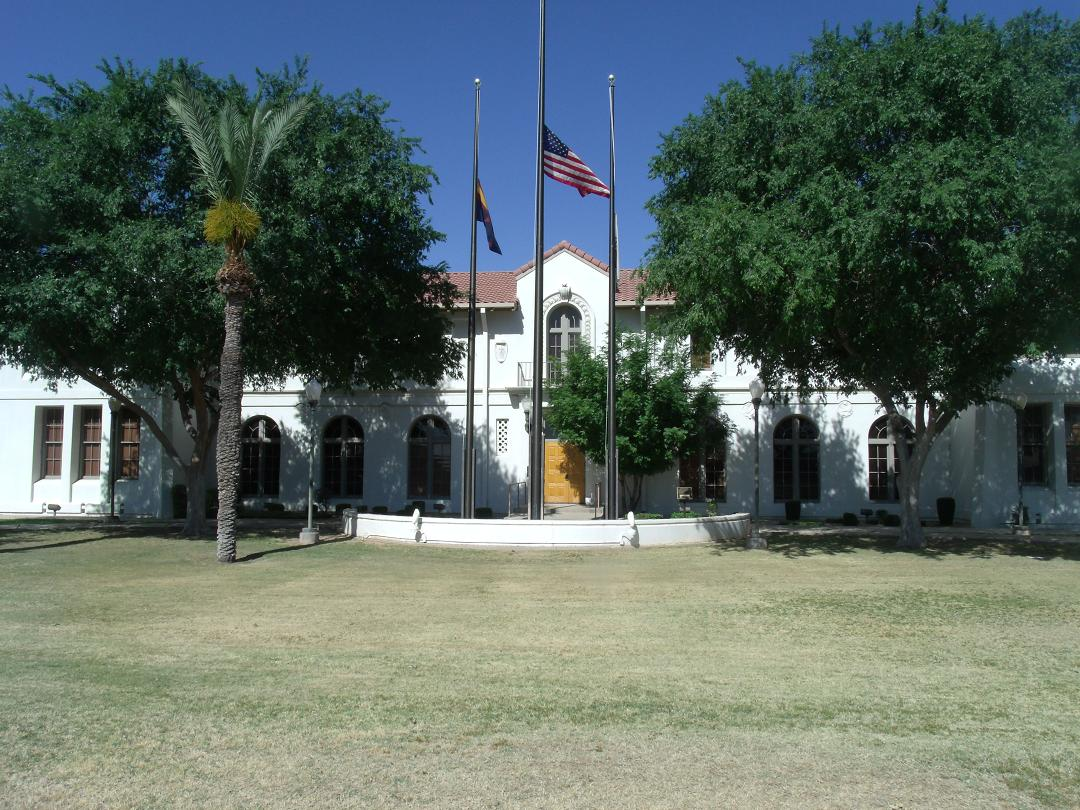
Gilbert High School.

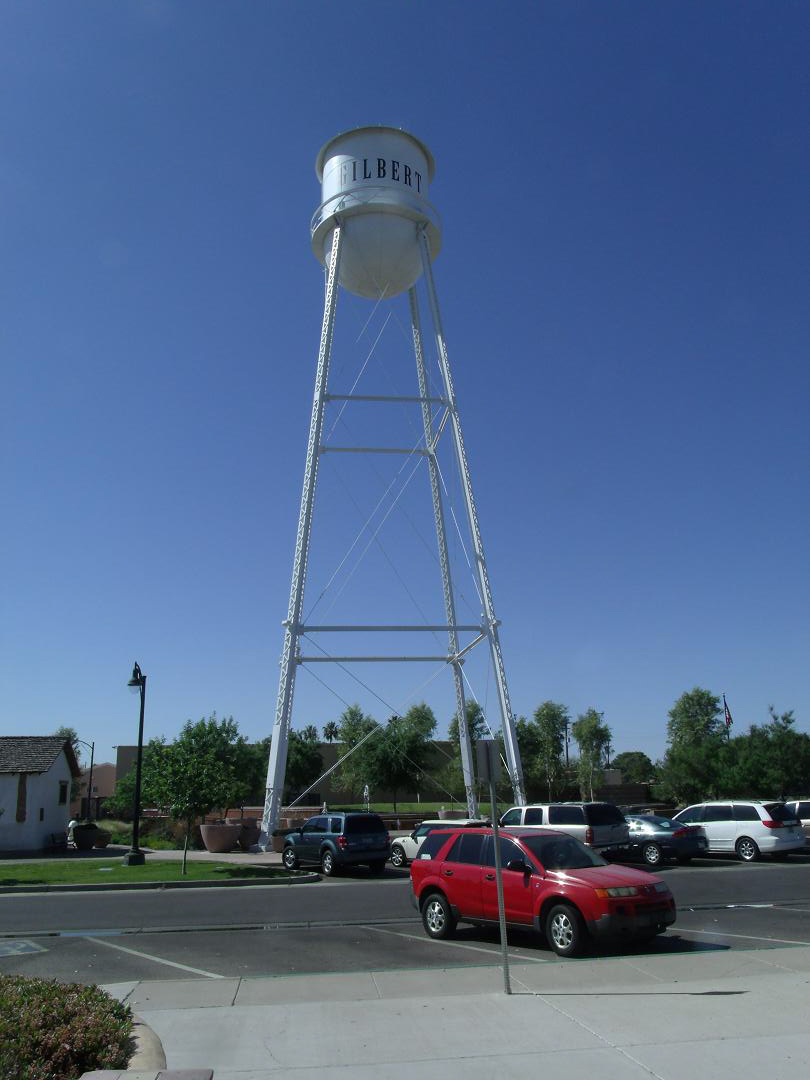
The Gilbert Water Tower.

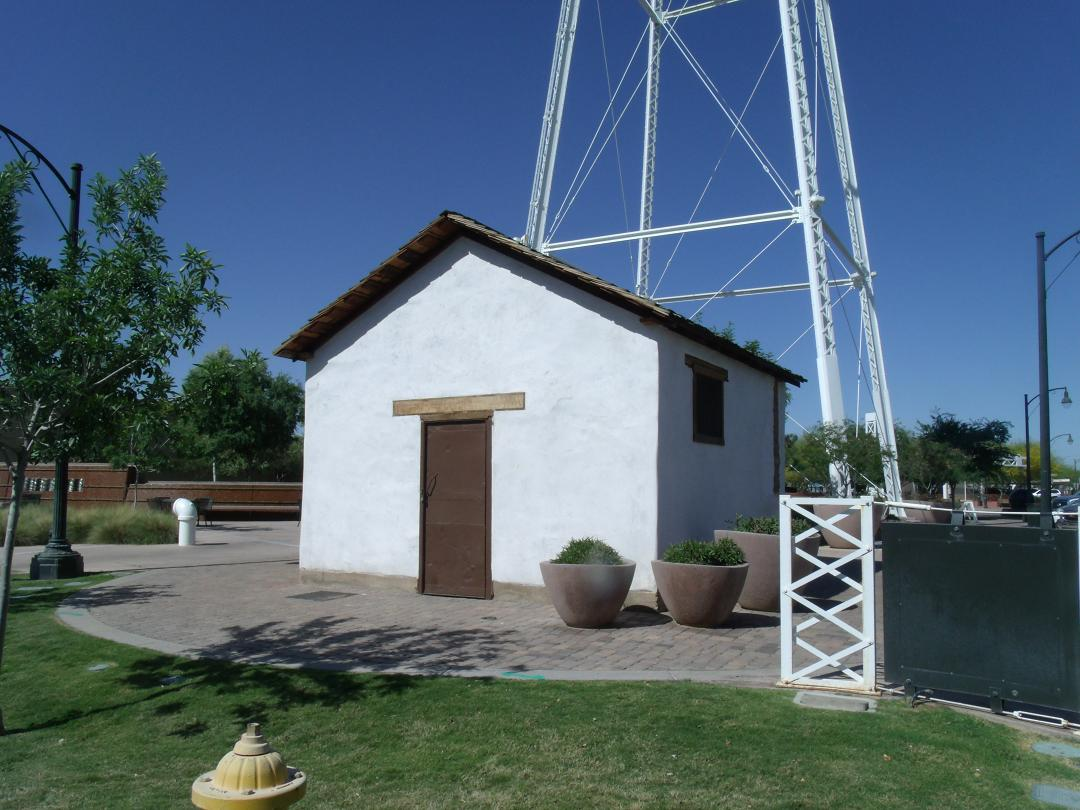
Gilbert's first jail house.

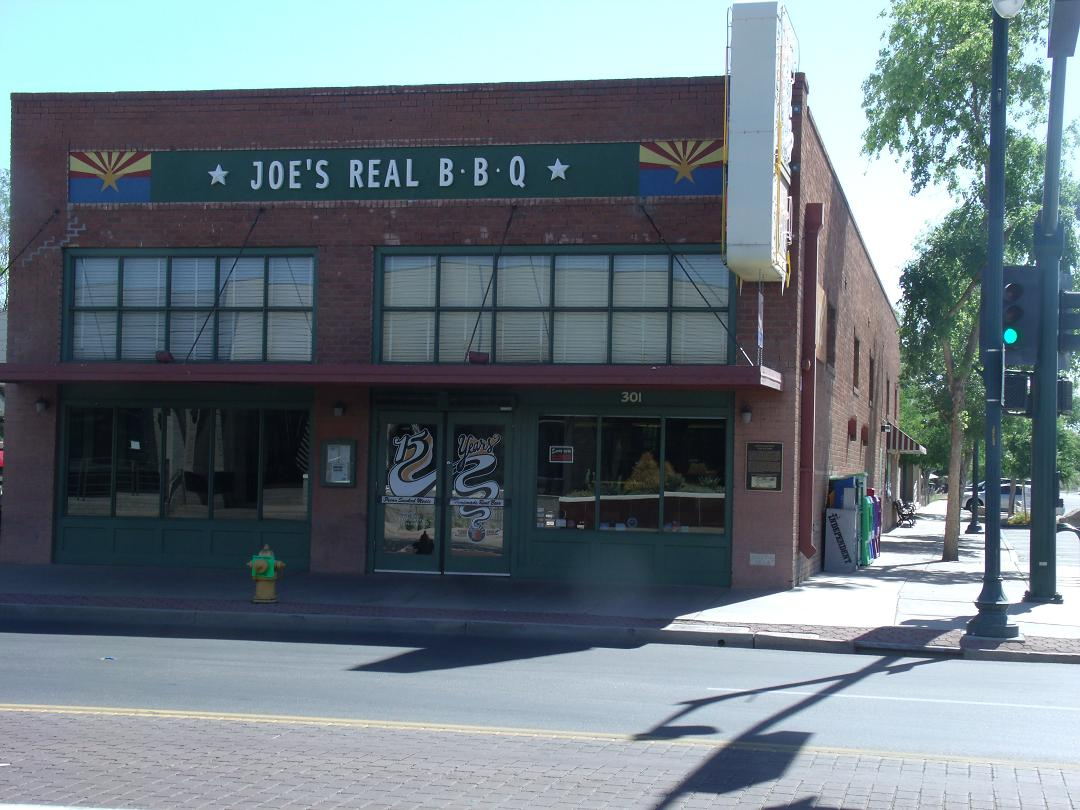
The Tone Building.

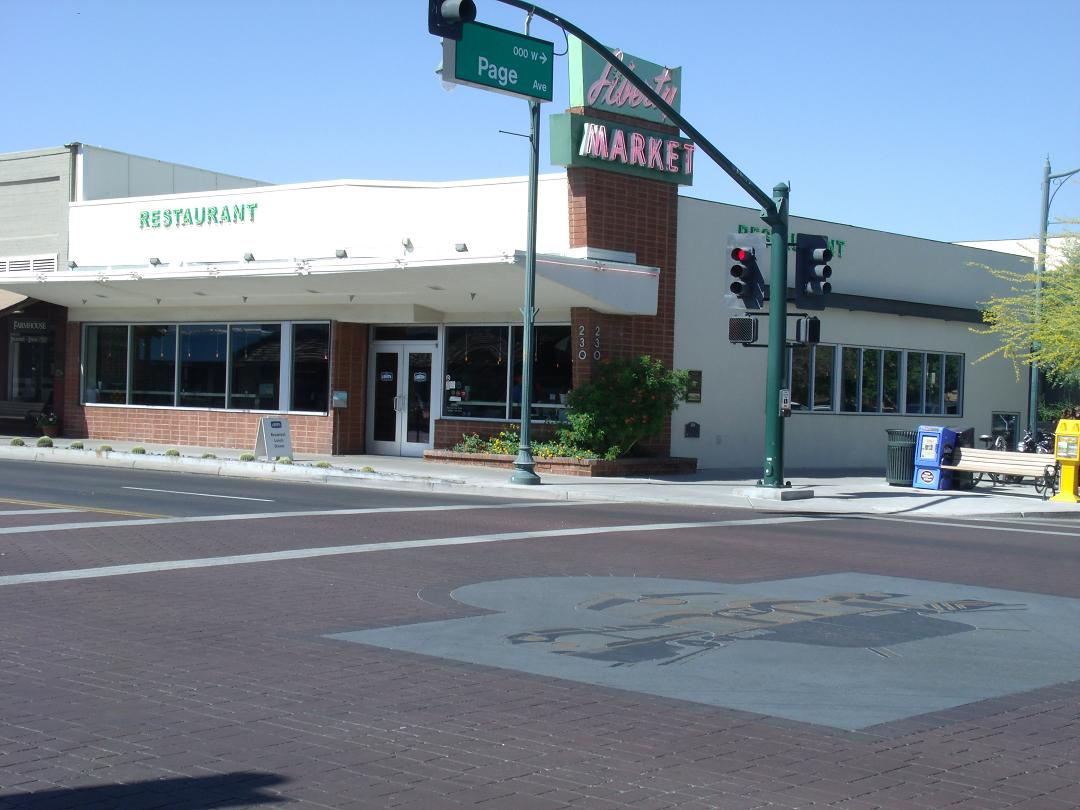
Liberty Market.

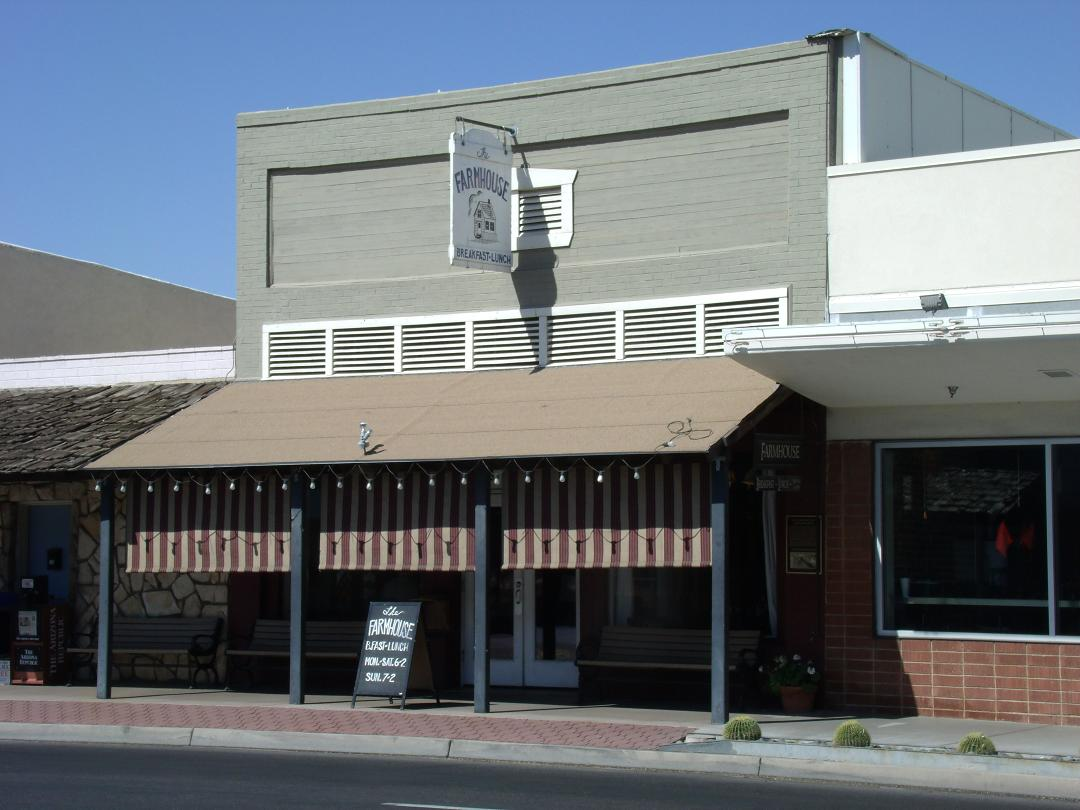
The Creed building.

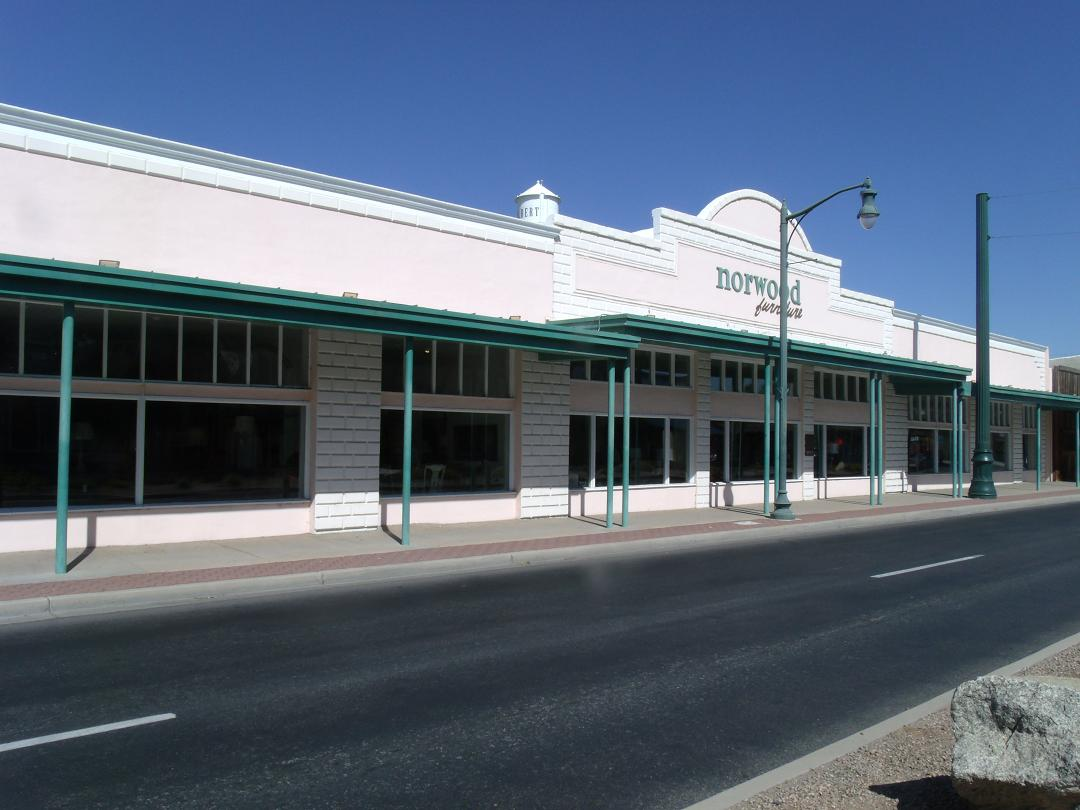
The Attaway Phelps-Blakely Building.

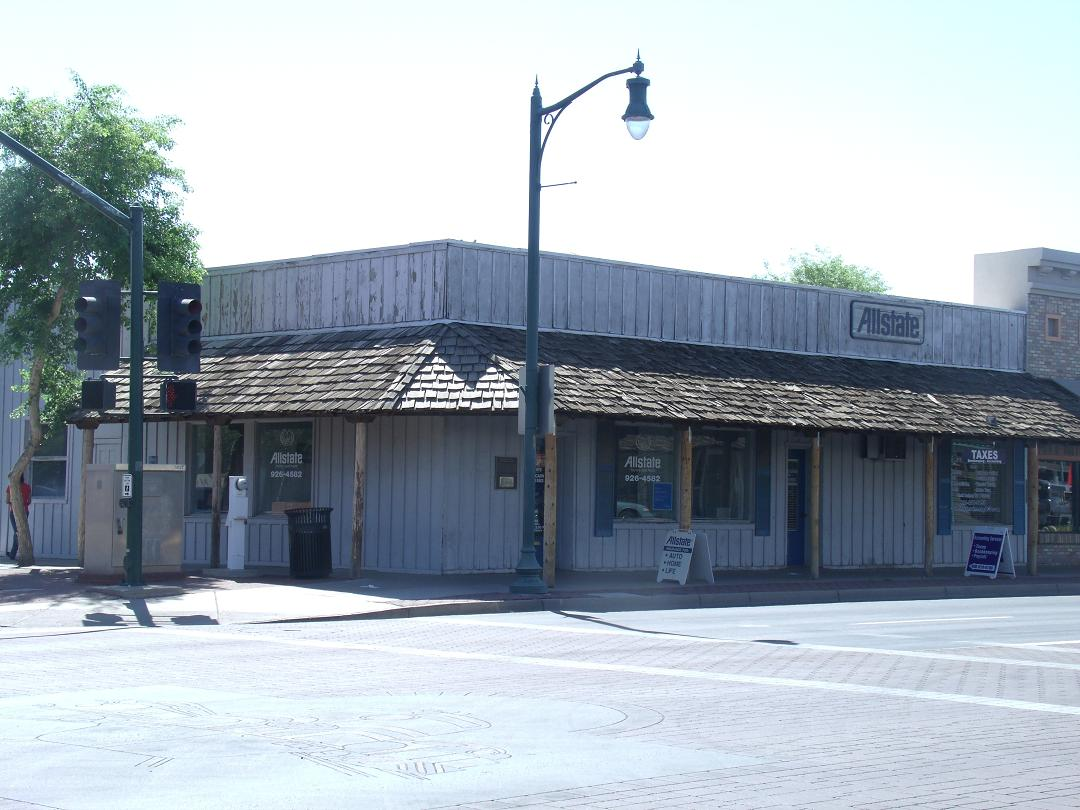
The Bank of Gilbert.

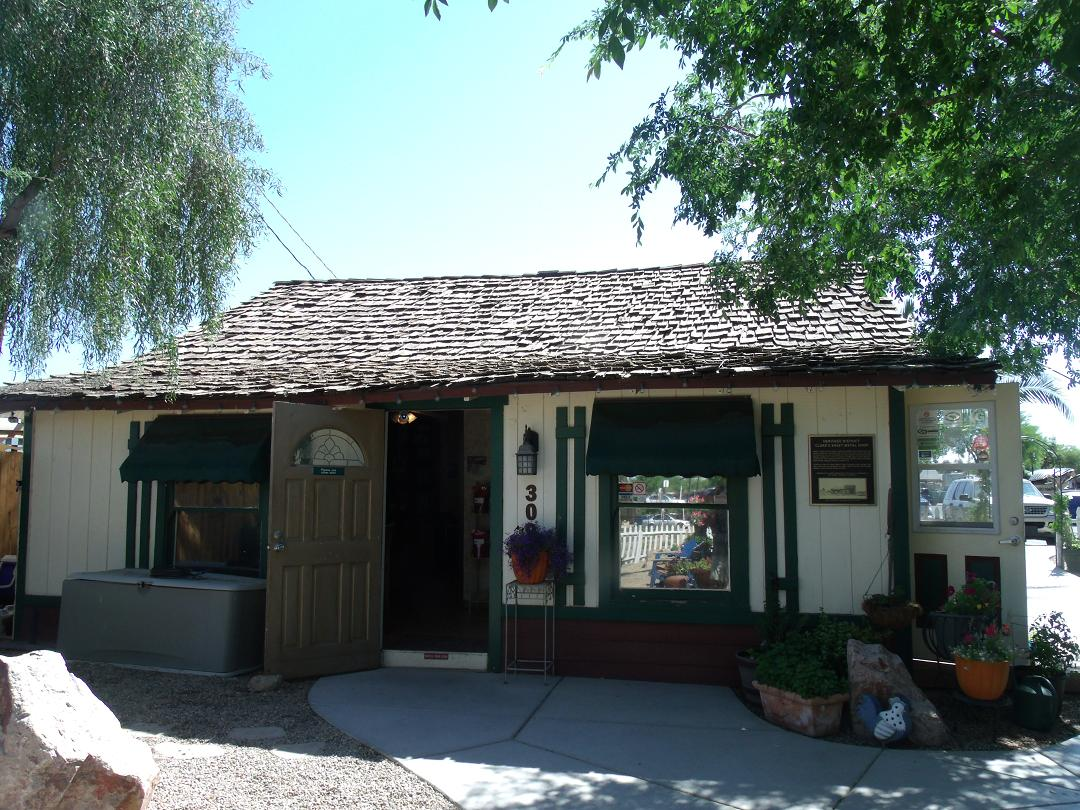
Clare's Metal Shop.

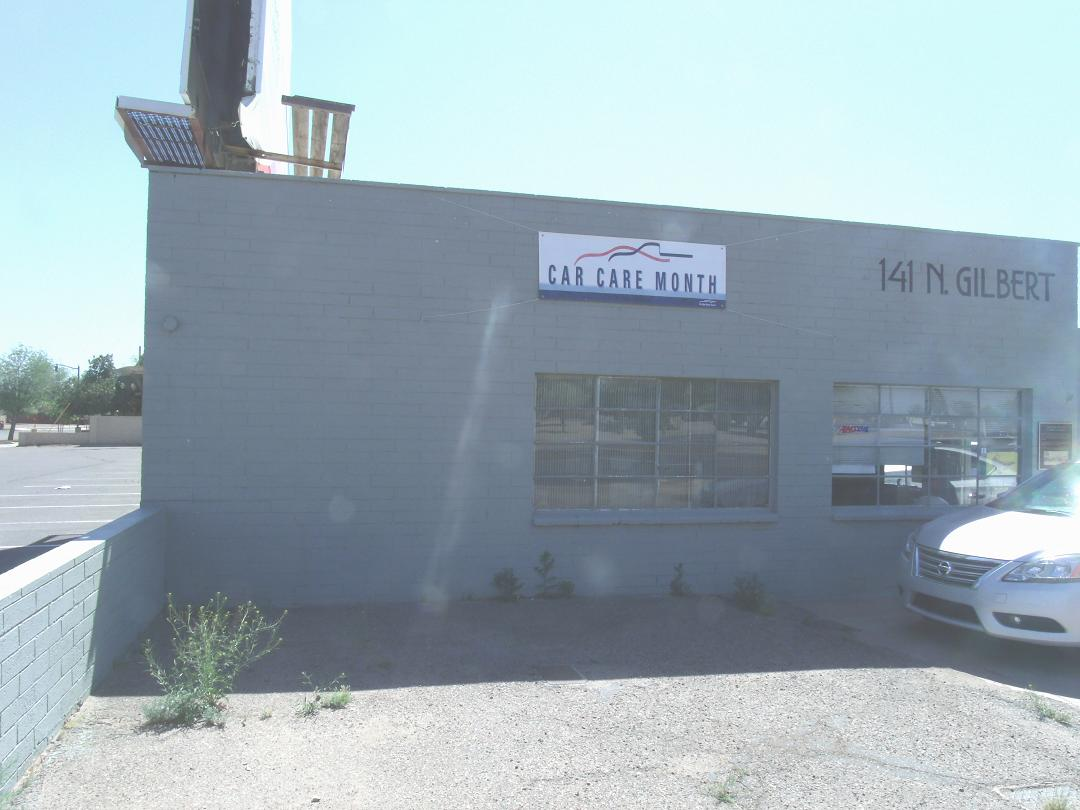
Clement's Garage.

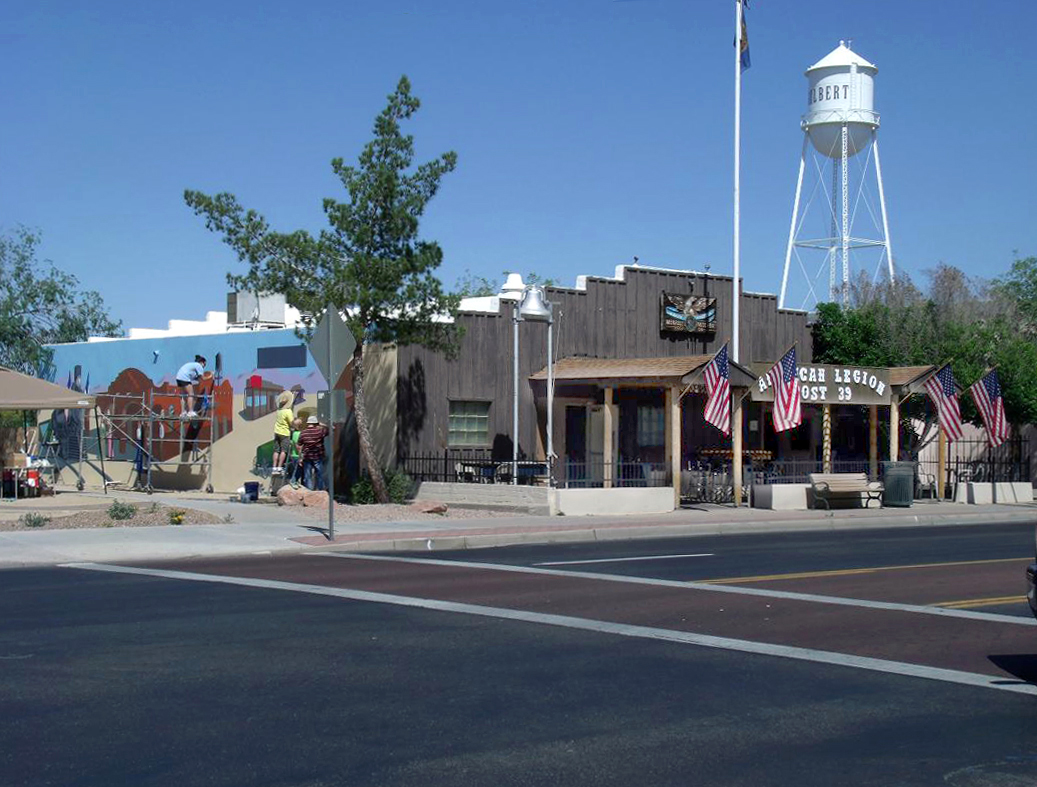
The American Legion Post 39.

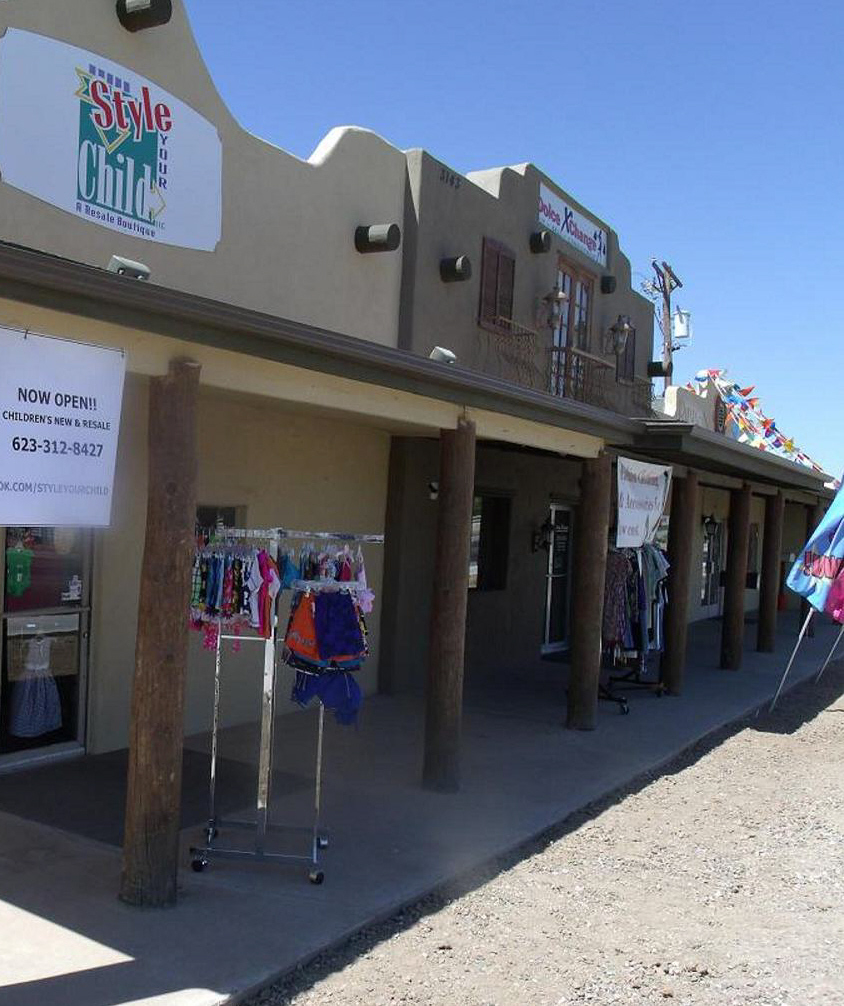
Higley General Store (1910)

== See also ==
- National Register of Historic Places listings in Maricopa County, Arizona
