= Phi Delta Theta Fraternity House (Champaign, Illinois) =

- U.S. National Register of Historic Places
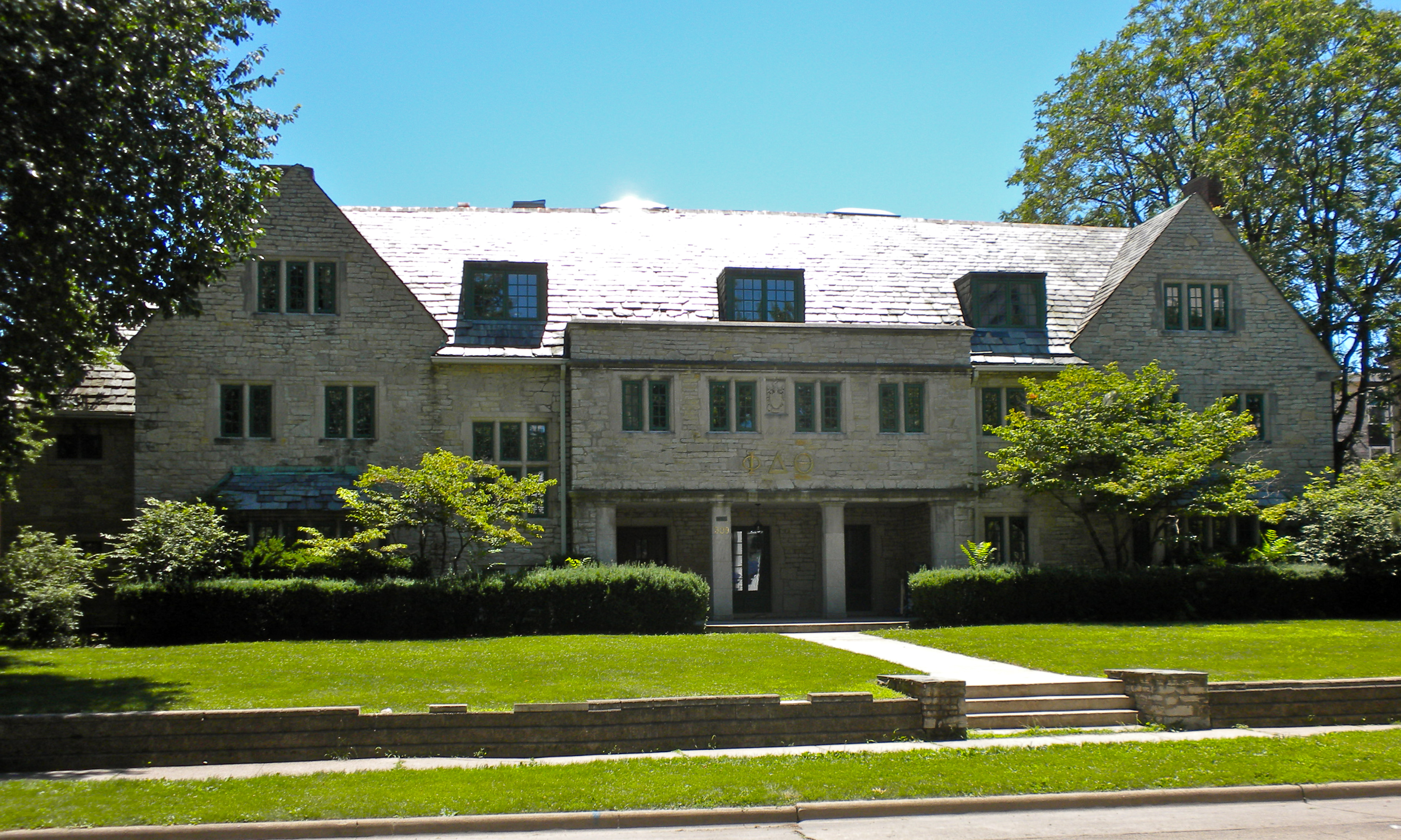

- Location within Illinois Location within the United States
- Location: 309 E. Chalmers St., Champaign, Illinois
- Coordinates: 40°6′22″N 88°14′3″W
- Area: less than one acre
- Built: 1922
- Built by: English Brothers
- Architect: Shaw, Howard Van Doren
- Architectural style: English Revival
- MPS: Fraternity and Sorority Houses at the Urbana--Champaign Campus of the University of Illinois MPS
- NRHP reference No.: 04000070
- Added to NRHP: February 25, 2004

The Phi Delta Theta Fraternity House is a historic fraternity house located at the University of Illinois at Urbana–Champaign in Champaign, Illinois. The Illinois Eta chapter of Phi Delta Theta built its chapter house in 1922. It was designed by architect Howard Van Doren Shaw in English Revival style. The house was listed on the National Register of Historic Places in 2004.

== History ==
Phi Delta Theta is a national social college fraternity that was established at Miami University in Oxford, Ohio, on December 26, 1848. The fraternity chartered its Illinois Eta chapter at the University of Illinois on February 9, 1893. It was the third fraternity on campus, forming shortly after the university repealed its anti-fraternity regulations. Illinois Eta's members were known for their athletic and academic achievements in the early 20th century. Illinois Eta built a new chapter house in 1922. The need for fraternity chapter houses was largely driven by a shortage of student housing on campus. The house is located at 309 East Chalmers Street inChampaign, Illinois. It is one of 77 fraternity and sorority houses at the university and is representative of the Greek letter organization movement that was flourishing at the University of Illinois in the early 20th century. Architectural Forum featured the house in 1922, calling it a "fraternity house of outstanding architectural importance."

The house was listed on the National Register of Historic Places on February 25, 2004, as the Phi Delta Theta Fraternity House.

== Architecture ==
Prominent Chicago architect Howard Van Doren Shaw designed the Phi Delta Theta Fraternity House. Shaw is best known for his work on large country houses. English Brothers, a local construction company built the house along with University Library and Memorial Stadium.

Phi Delta Theta Fraternity House is in the English Revival style, which imitates domestic English architecture from the 16th century. The house has an ashlar limestone exterior and includes a steep gable roof with intersecting gables on either side and a recessed loggia supported by columns at the front entrance. It features grouped casement windows and tall chimneys.

== See also ==
- North American fraternity and sorority housing
