= Building at 201 North Market Street =

- U.S. National Register of Historic Places
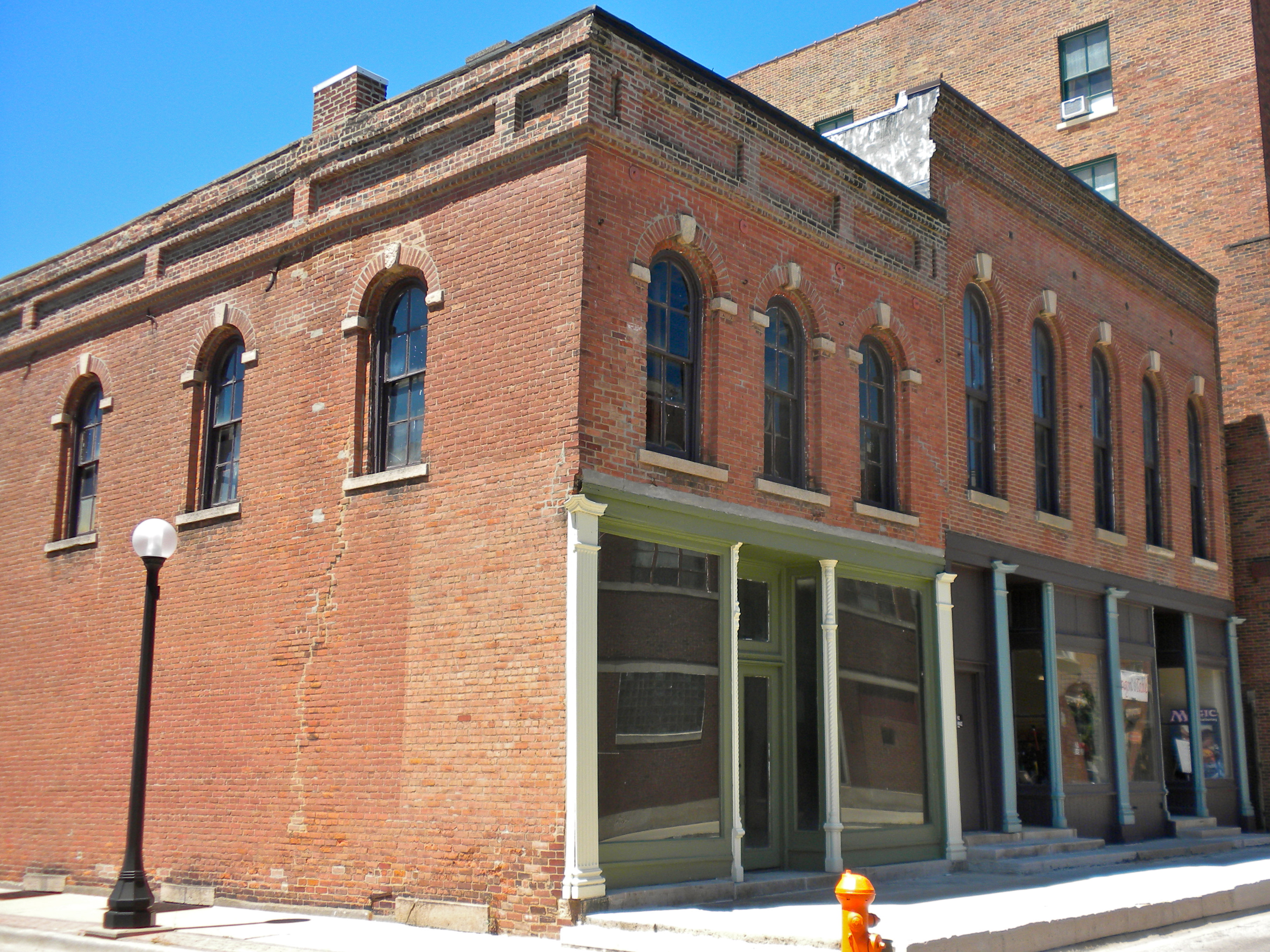
- 201 North Market Street, with 203-205 North Market Street in the background

- Location within Illinois Location within the United States
- Location: 201 N. Market St., Champaign, Illinois
- Coordinates: 40°7′2″N 88°14′30″W
- Area: less than one acre
- Built: c. 1870
- Architectural style: Italianate
- NRHP reference No.: 97001335
- Added to NRHP: November 7, 1997

201 North Market Street is a historic commercial building located in Champaign, Illinois.

== Description and history ==
Built in about 1870, the building has an architecturally significant Italianate commercial design, stylistically matching its neighbor at 203–205 North Market Street. The Italianate style was popular in the United States from the 1850s through the 1880s and was used heavily in both residential and commercial buildings. The two-story building's characteristic Italianate features include its tall, narrow arched windows and a brick entablature below the roof line. The first floor has an original cast iron storefront, a popular decoration for commercial buildings of the era. A limestone sidewalk, possibly the only 19th-century stone sidewalk remaining in Champaign, runs in front of the building.

The building, along with its companion building at 203–205 North Market Street, was added to the National Register of Historic Places on November 7, 1997.
