= The Georgian (Champaign, Illinois) =

Historic apartment building in Champaign, Illinois, United States

- U.S. National Register of Historic Places
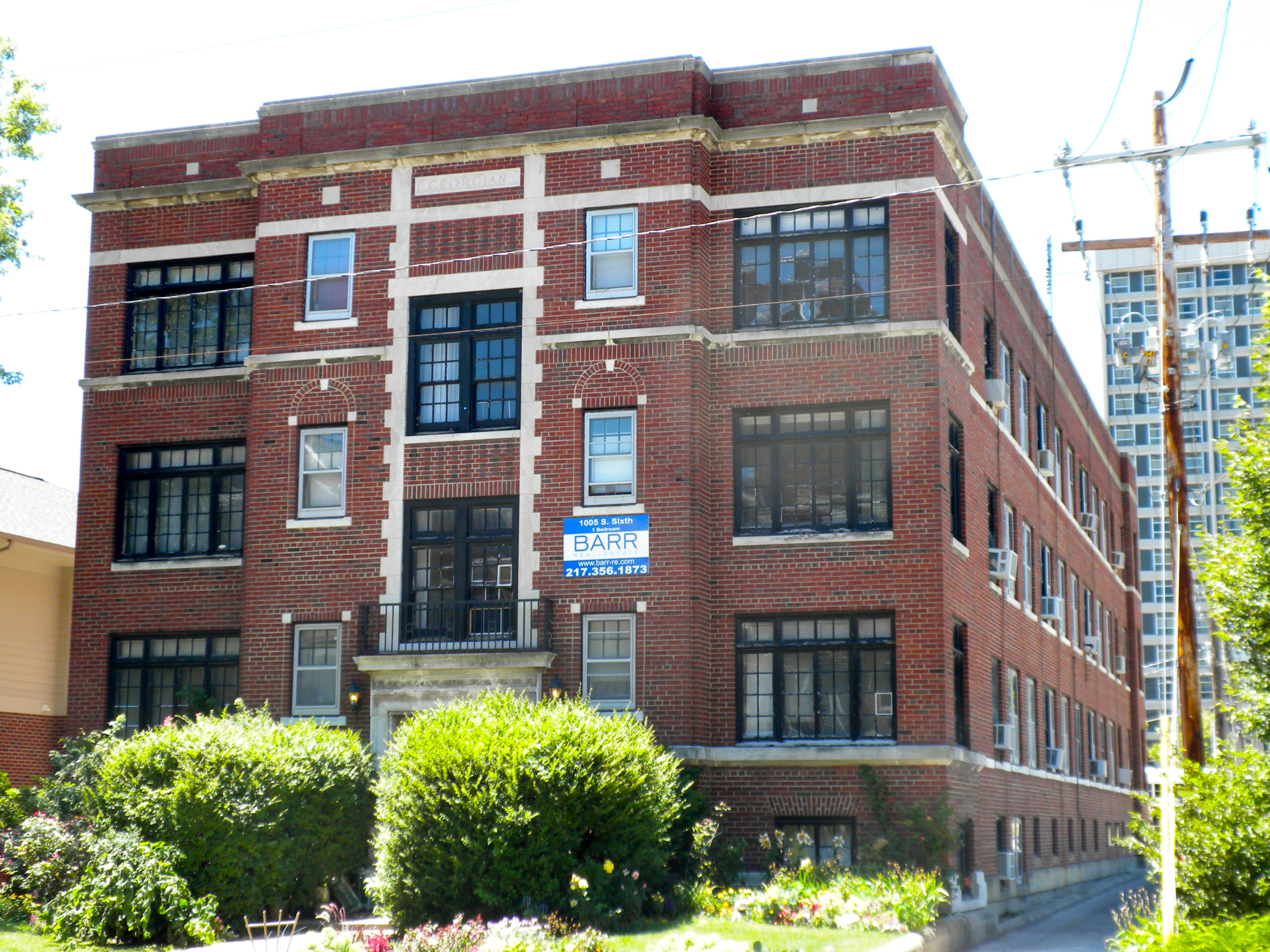

- Location within Illinois Location within the United States
- Location: 1005 S. Sixth St., Champaign, Illinois
- Coordinates: 40°6′30″N 88°13′50″W
- Area: less than one acre
- Built: 1925
- Architectural style: Georgian Revival
- NRHP reference No.: 05001260
- Added to NRHP: November 15, 2005

The Georgian is a historic apartment building located at 1005 South Sixth Street in Champaign, Illinois. Developer Roger F. Little, who also served in the Illinois General Assembly, had the building constructed in 1925. The building has a Georgian Revival design; the style was popular in Champaign, as it was the predominant architectural style on the University of Illinois campus. The three-story red brick building uses concrete and decorative brickwork in its details. The five-bay front facade features a three-bay projection about the central entrance. The main doorway features a Classical surround and is topped by an entablature and cornice. The windows above this entrance, which are offset and open to a staircase, have transoms and brick spandrels. Continuous concrete sills encircle the building below the first- and third-story windows, and a continuous lintel runs above the third story.

The building was added to the National Register of Historic Places on November 15, 2005.
