= Francis and Abbie Solon House =

Historic house in Illinois, United States

- U.S. National Register of Historic Places
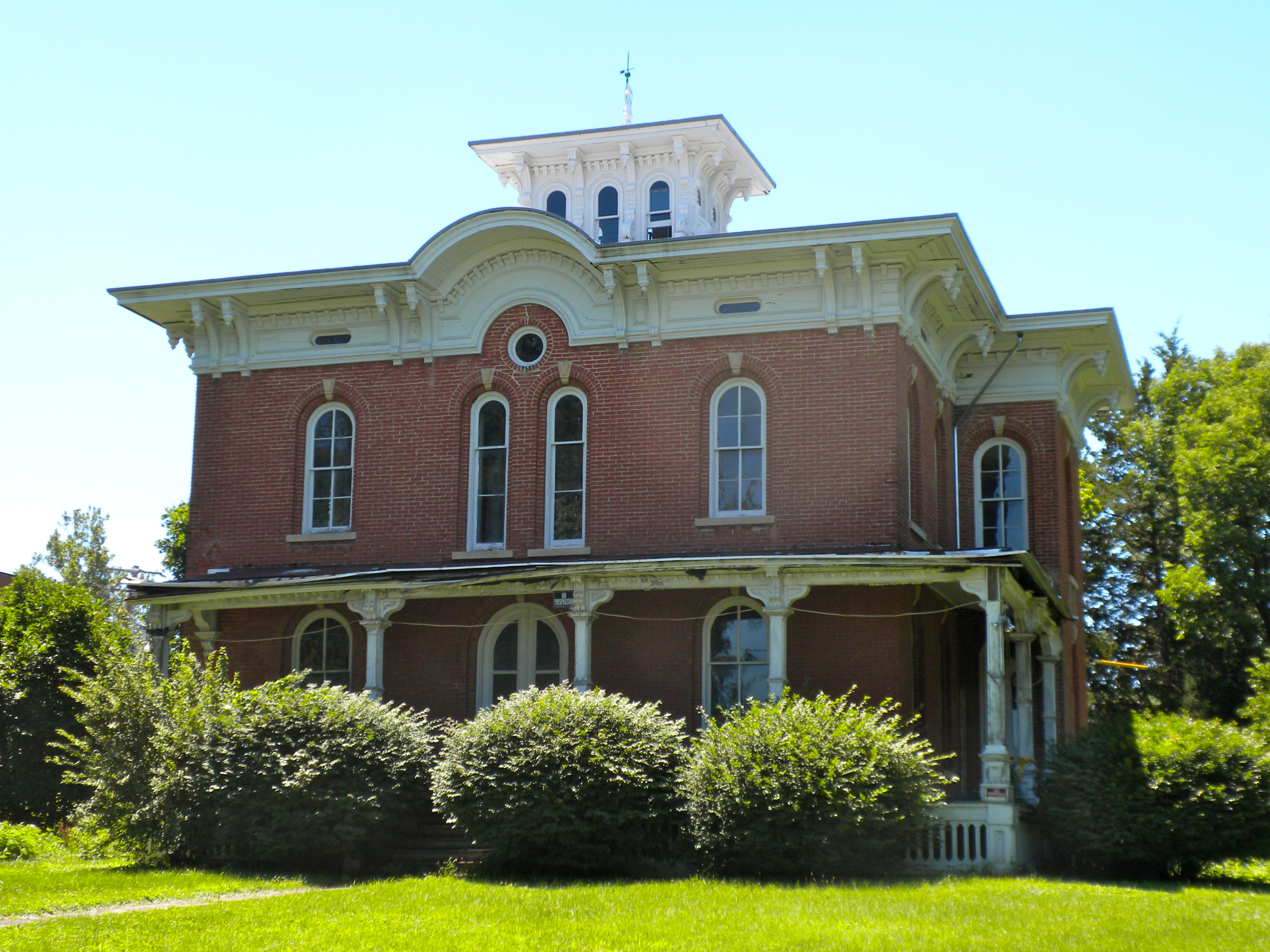

- Location within Illinois Location within the United States
- Location: 503 South State St., Champaign, Illinois
- Coordinates: 40°6′41″N 88°14′49″W
- Area: less than one acre
- Architect: Brown, Seeley
- Architectural style: Italianate
- NRHP reference No.: 07000644
- Added to NRHP: July 3, 2007

The Francis and Abbie Solon House is a historic house located at 503 South State Street in Champaign, Illinois. Developer William Barrett built the house for himself in 1867. Architect Seeley Brown designed the house in the Tuscan Villa subtype of the Italianate style. The house features a wraparound front porch with chamfered columns and an entablature and frieze with decorative brackets and a central arch, all distinctive elements of the Italianate style. A square cupola with similar bracketing rises from the center of the house's flat roof; this roof structure, along with the house's symmetrical plan, is a defining element of the Tuscan Villa form. Barrett sold the house to Abel Harwood and his family in 1869; the Harwood family owned the house until 1907, when they sold it to Francis and Abbie Solon. The house stayed with the Solon family until 2005, when it was donated to the Preservation & Conservation Society. The house was sold to a private individual in 2017 and has since undergone extensive renovation to be returned to use as a single family home.

The house was added to the National Register of Historic Places on July 3, 2007.
