= Henry Ahrens House =

Historic house in Illinois, United States

- U.S. National Register of Historic Places
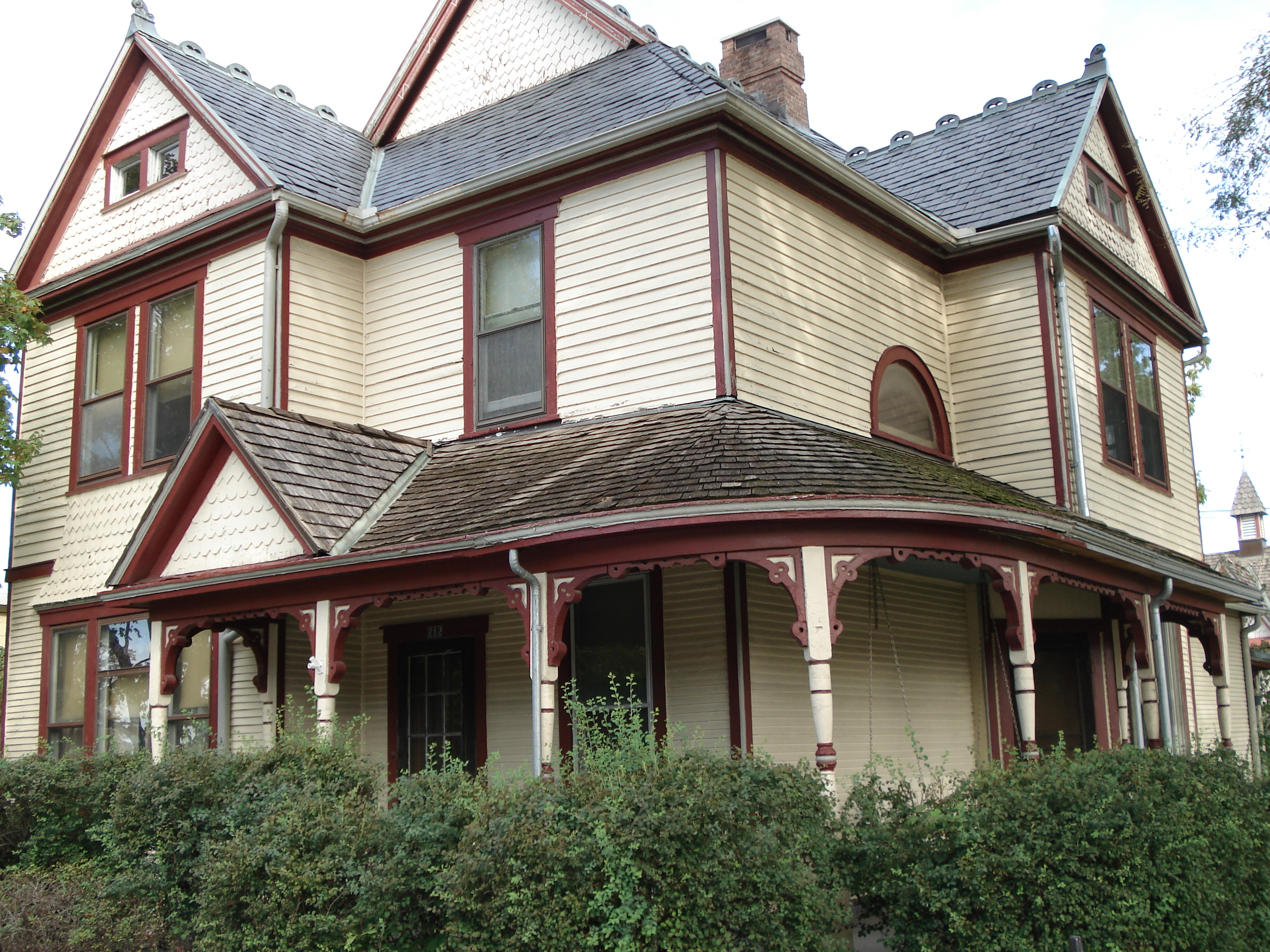

- Location within Illinois Location within the United States
- Location: 212 E. University Ave., Champaign, Illinois
- Coordinates: 40°7′0″N 88°14′8″W
- Built: 1893
- Architect: Seely Brown
- Architectural style: Queen Anne
- NRHP reference No.: 11000845
- Added to NRHP: November 22, 2011

The Henry Ahrens House is a historic house located at 212 East University Avenue in Champaign, Illinois. The house was built in 1893 for local businessman Henry Ahrens; it still remains in his family. Architect Seely Brown, who ran a well-regarded practice in Champaign, designed the Queen Anne house. The 2 1/2-story house has an asymmetrical plan with a multi-component roof that includes both hipped and gabled sections. The gable ends are decorated with patterned wooden shingles, which are also used on a porch gable and the hood of a three-sided bay window. The wraparound front porch is supported by turned columns; brackets with scalloped and half-circle decorations adorn the tops of the columns.

The house was added to the National Register of Historic Places on November 22, 2011.
