= Wee Haven =

Historic house in Illinois, United States

- U.S. National Register of Historic Places
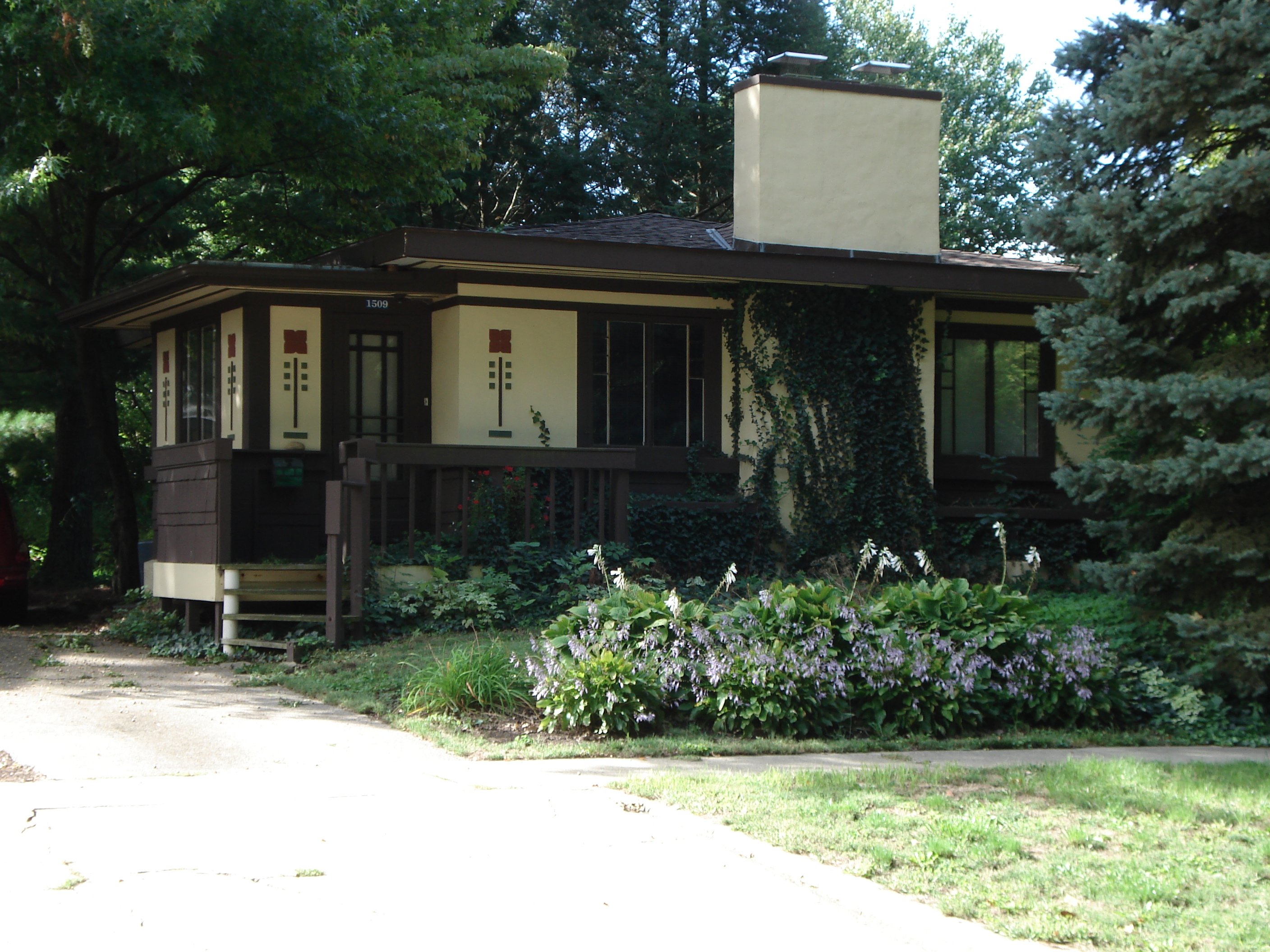

- Location within Illinois Location within the United States
- Location: 1509 W. Park Ave., Champaign, Illinois
- Coordinates: 40°7′2″N 88°16′17″W
- Built: 1925
- Architect: Charles Saxby Elwood
- Architectural style: Prairie School
- NRHP reference No.: 11000906
- Added to NRHP: December 15, 2011

Wee Haven is a historic house located at 1509 West Park Avenue in Champaign, Illinois. The Prairie School house was built in 1925; its design came from a plan which architect Charles Saxby Elwood had published in Fruit, Garden and Home magazine the previous year. As is typical in Prairie School designs, the house has a heavy emphasis on horizontality, as can be seen in its low massing, flat roof with wide eaves, and casement windows with art glass. The house's various ornaments, which include tile prairie flowers, a wooden apron and string course, and fascia along the eaves, also add to its horizontal focus. The house's fireplace, its most distinctive Prairie School interior feature, has a tile hearth with a brick surround and two more decorative tile flowers.

The house was added to the National Register of Historic Places on December 15, 2011.
