= Building at 203–205 North Market Street =

- U.S. National Register of Historic Places
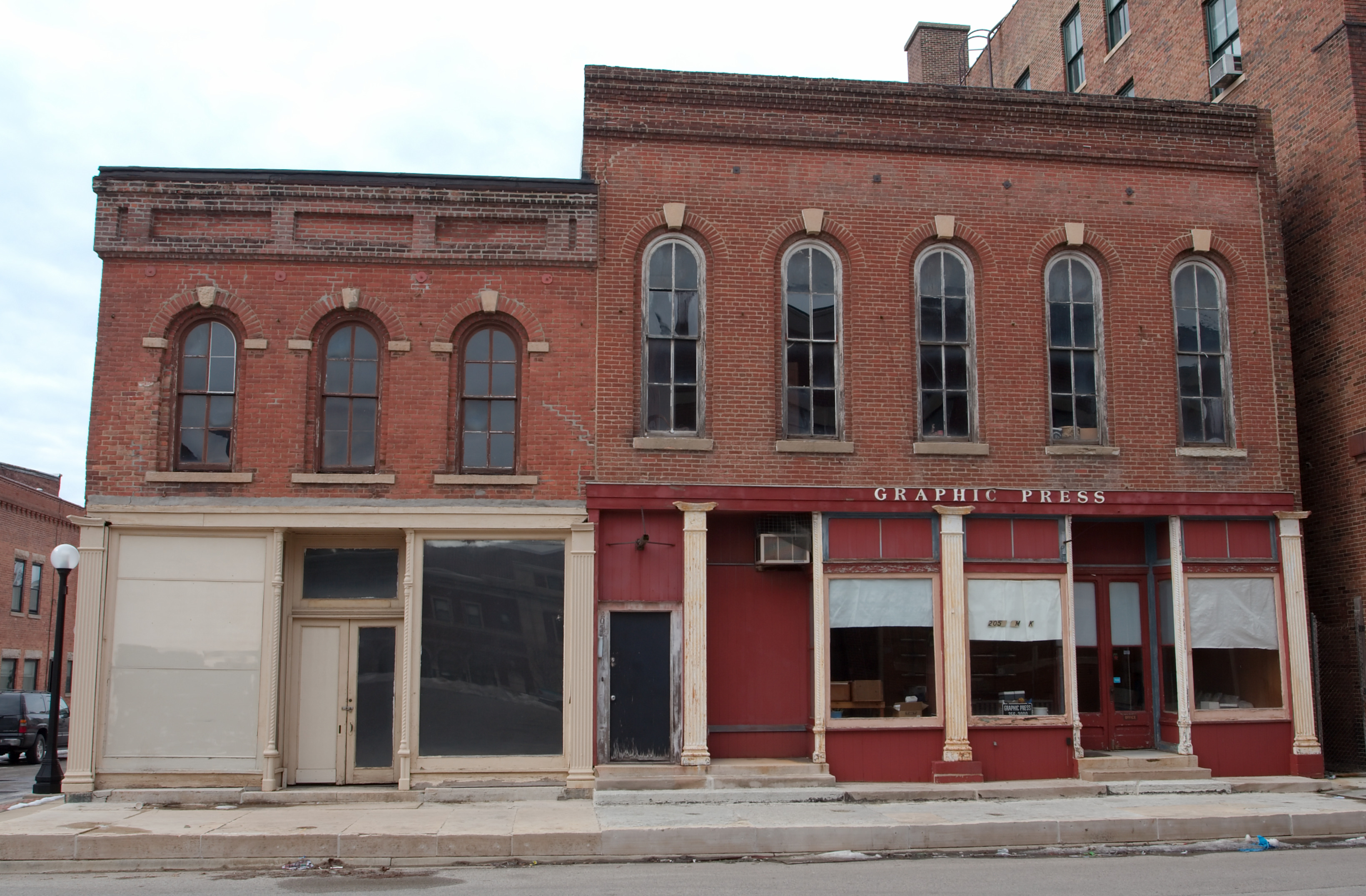
- 203–205 North Market Street on the right, with 201 North Market Street on the left

- Location within Illinois Location within the United States
- Location: 203–205 N. Market St., Champaign, Illinois
- Coordinates: 40°7′4″N 88°12′23″W
- Area: less than one acre
- Built: c. 1870
- Architectural style: Italianate
- NRHP reference No.: 97001336
- Added to NRHP: November 7, 1997

The building at 203–205 North Market Street is a historic commercial building located in Champaign, Illinois. Built circa 1870, the building has an architecturally significant Italianate design, stylistically matching its neighbor at 201 North Market Street. The Italianate style was popular in both residential and commercial buildings in the United States from the 1850s through the 1880s. The two-story building's characteristic Italianate features include its tall, narrow arched windows capped with keystones and its brick entablature. The building also has a cast iron storefront with classical details, a popular decorative element in contemporary commercial buildings. A limestone sidewalk, possibly the only 19th-century stone sidewalk remaining in Champaign, runs in front of the building.

The building was added to the National Register of Historic Places on November 7, 1997, along with its companion building at 201 North Market Street.
