= List of historic properties in Buckeye, Arizona =

- Town
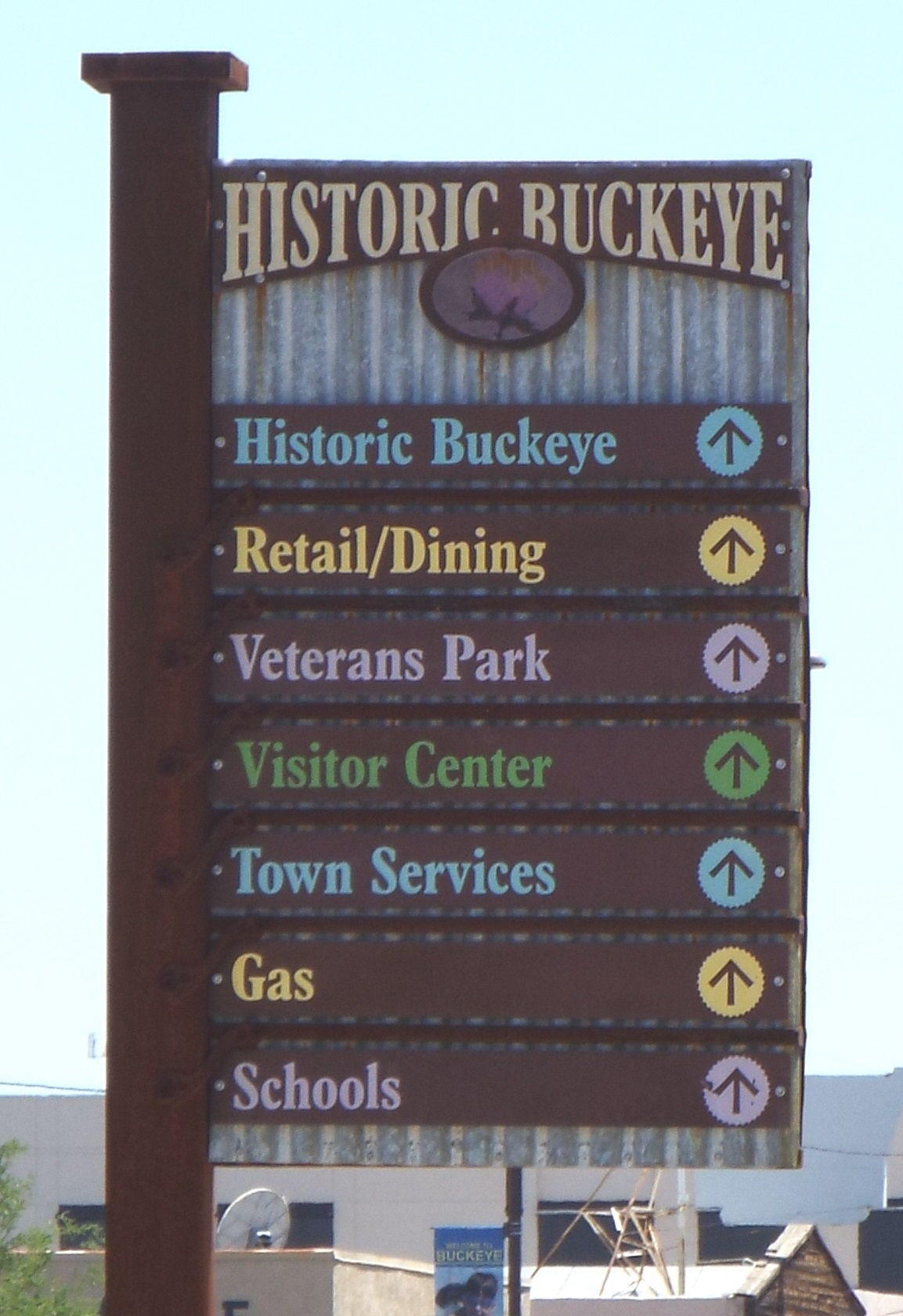
- Historic Buckeye

- Location in Maricopa County and the state of Arizona

This is a list, which includes a photographic gallery, of some of the remaining structures and monuments, of historic significance in Buckeye, a town in Maricopa County, Arizona and the surrounding communities of Liberty and Palo Verde located in the Buckeye valley. Buckeye was first inhabited by the Hohokam culture. In 1929, The Town of Buckeye was incorporated. One of the structures, the Buckeye Union High School A-Wing, is listed in the National Register of Historic Properties. Some are considered historical by the Buckeye Parks and Recreation Master Plan.

== Brief history ==
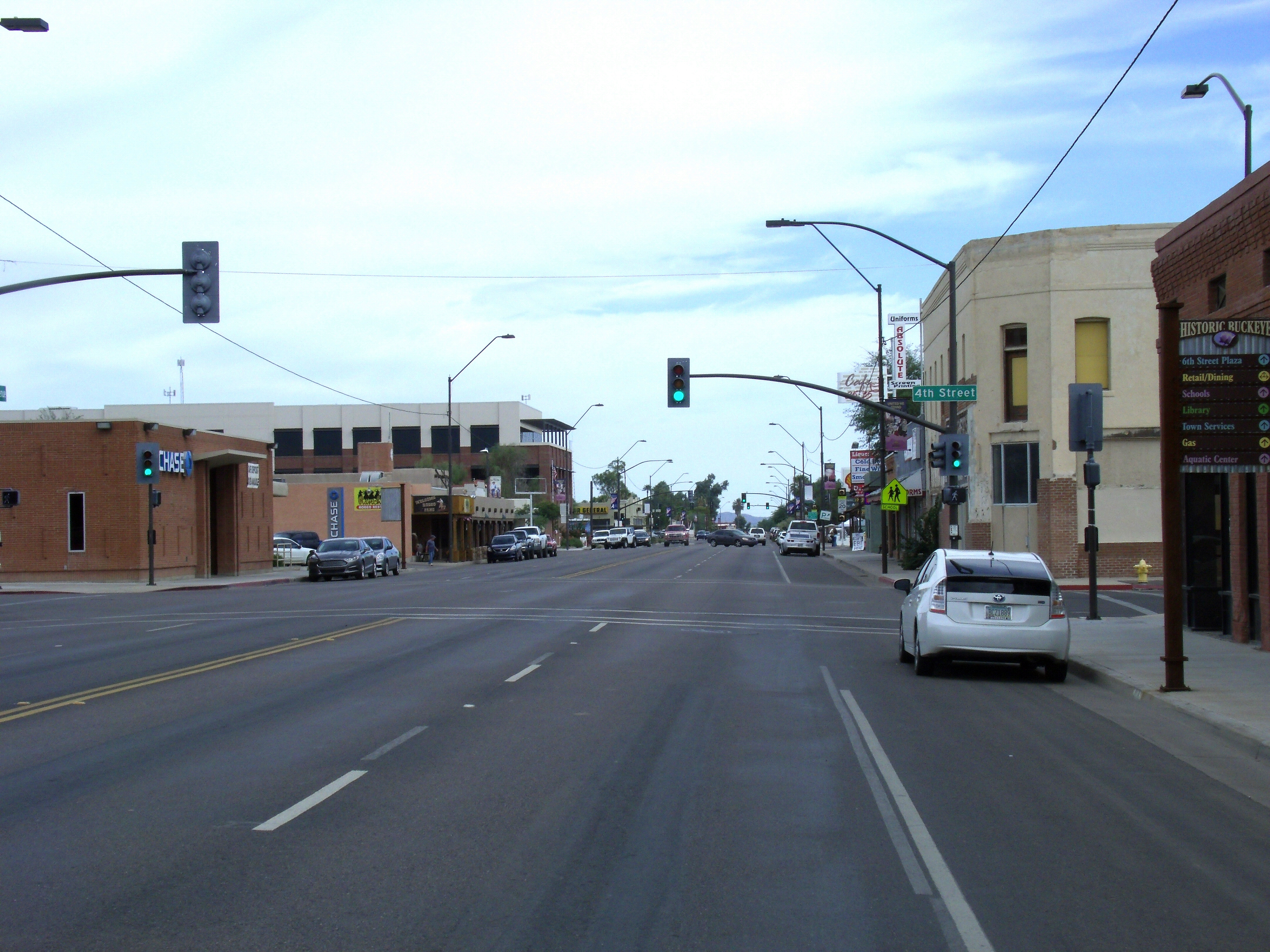
Historic Buckeye Downtown as seen from Monroe Ave.

The area in which Buckeye is located was a hot desert region inhabited by the Hohokam, a Native American culture. Thomas Newton "Newt" Clanton and his family were the first settlers of European descent to arrive in the area. They came from the state of Ohio. The need of a canal system, which would provide them with water to irrigate their homesteads, was apparent. The Buckeye Canal was developed in 1884 by Malin M. Jackson a native of Sidney, Ohio. In 1885, Clanton accepted a contract to build ten miles of the Buckeye Canal which he had helped to organize and promote. William "Bob" R. Beloat played an instrumental role in organizing the Buckeye Irrigation Company. Together with his brother John, he assisted in turning the first water into the company ditch. The canal's name was derived from the Ohio moniker "The Buckeye State". The townsite was laid out in 1888 by Clanton, Jackson, and William (‘Bucky’) O’Neill, (of Rough Rider fame). Jackson named the new town "Sidney" and the plat was filed with the County that same year. The town's name was legally changed to Buckeye in 1910 and it was incorporated in 1929.

The historic U.S.Highway 80 passes through Buckeye. The roots of the U.S. 80 date back to the late 1846 and was one of the first roads that went through the Arizona Territory. The road began in Yuma and followed the Gila River to Buckeye and so on. The highway has been known by various names including the Bankhead Highway and the Old Spanish Trail. The highway was decommissioned in Arizona in 1989 and renumbered Arizona 80.

In 1942, the United States Army Air Force established Luke Aux Field #5, an air force base in Buckeye at an elevation of 1021 feet. It is located on 3000 South Palo Verde Road. After the war ended the airport became the Buckeye Municipal Airport, a city owned public use airport. Buckeye named the airfield in the airport the Ensign John C. Butler Field. Butler was a United States Naval Aviator who was posthumously awarded the Navy Cross for his actions in the Battle of Midway. There are various World War II related aircraft's and vehicles in the airport.

The Buckeye Main Street Coalition, founded in 1986, has the mission of enhancing and preserving downtown Buckeye. Just because a property is listed in the NRHP it does not mean that the property is safe from being demolished by its owner. According to Jim McPherson, Arizona Preservation Foundation Board President: "It is crucial that residents, private interests, and government officials act now to save these elements of our cultural heritage before it is too late.”

Other areas in the Buckeye Valley, such as Liberty and Palo Verde were developed at the same time as Buckeye. William "Bob" Beloat also contributed in the establishment of the community of Liberty where various families, among them the Spain family, established homesteads. The Palo Verde area was settled in 1886, by John G. Roberts and family. Mr. Roberts helped in the construction of the Arizona and Buckeye canals, served a term as cattle inspector, and was deputy sheriff at Buckeye under three Maricopa County sheriffs. One of the first structures built, which still stands today, was the Palo Verde Baptist Church, organized in 1890.

== Properties pictured ==
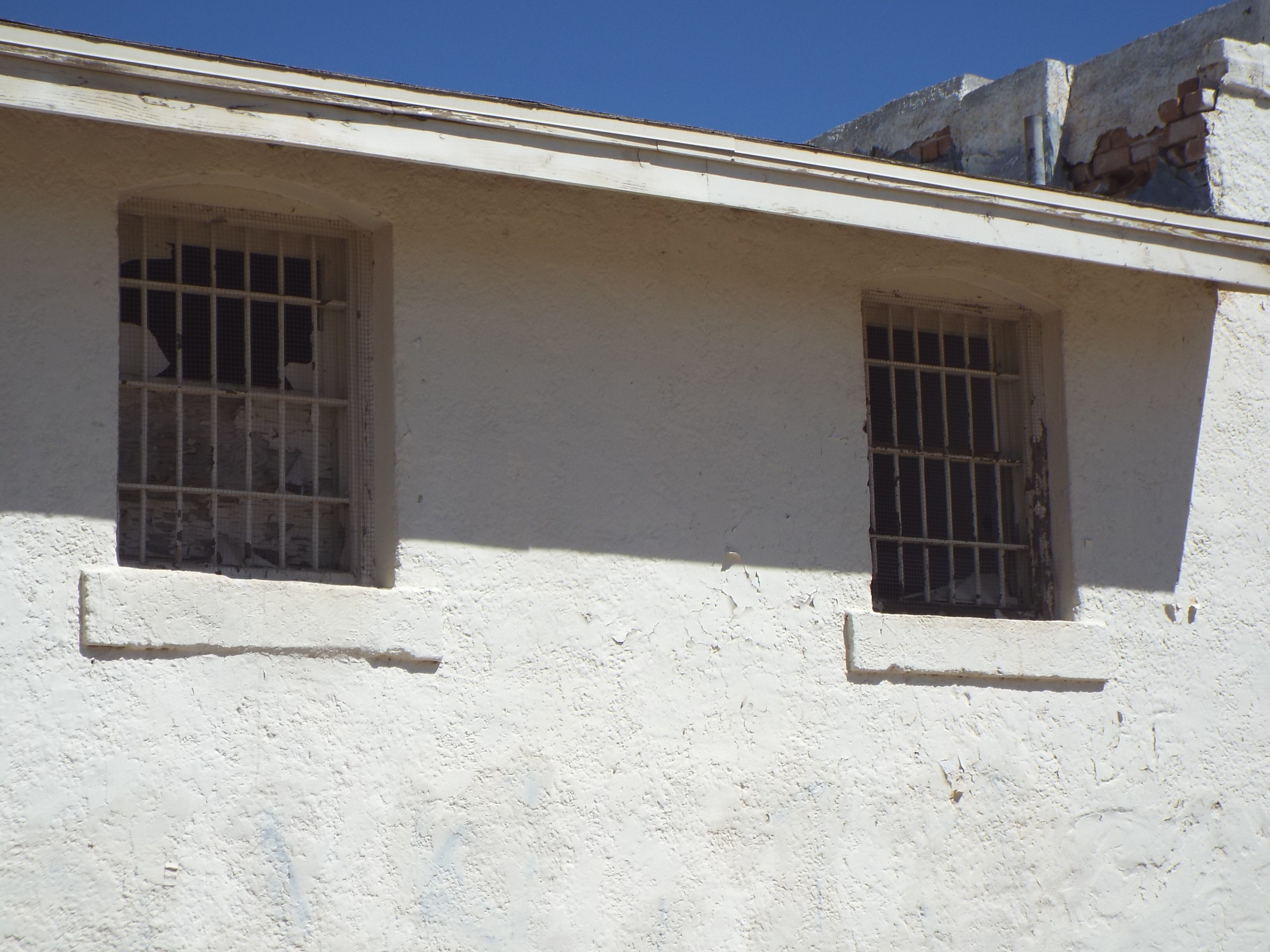
The jail bars are still in place in the windows of the Old Courthouse and Jail.

The following is a brief description of the historic properties that are pictured:

=== Buckeye ===
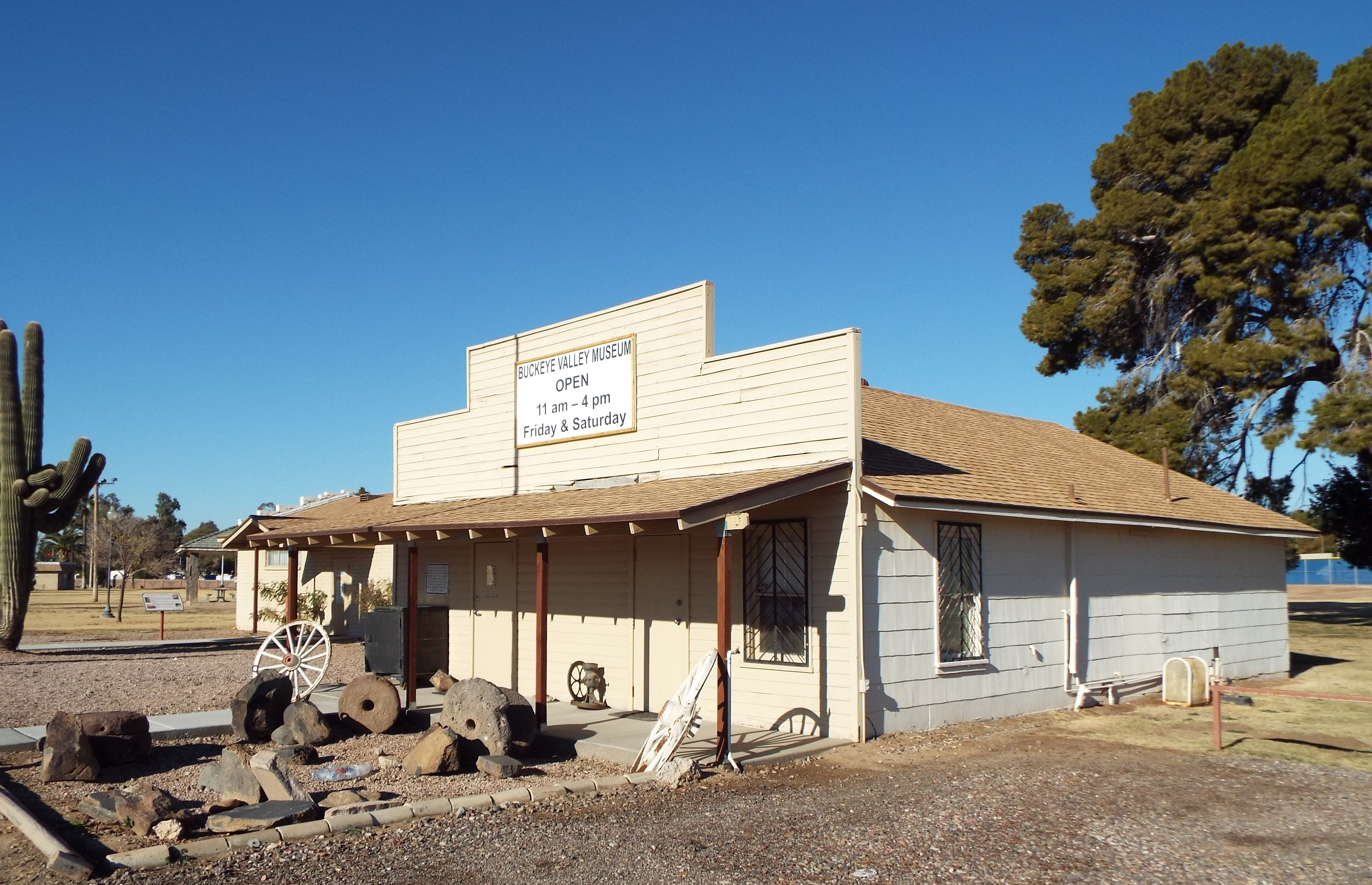
H.E. Kell and Co. General Merchandise store

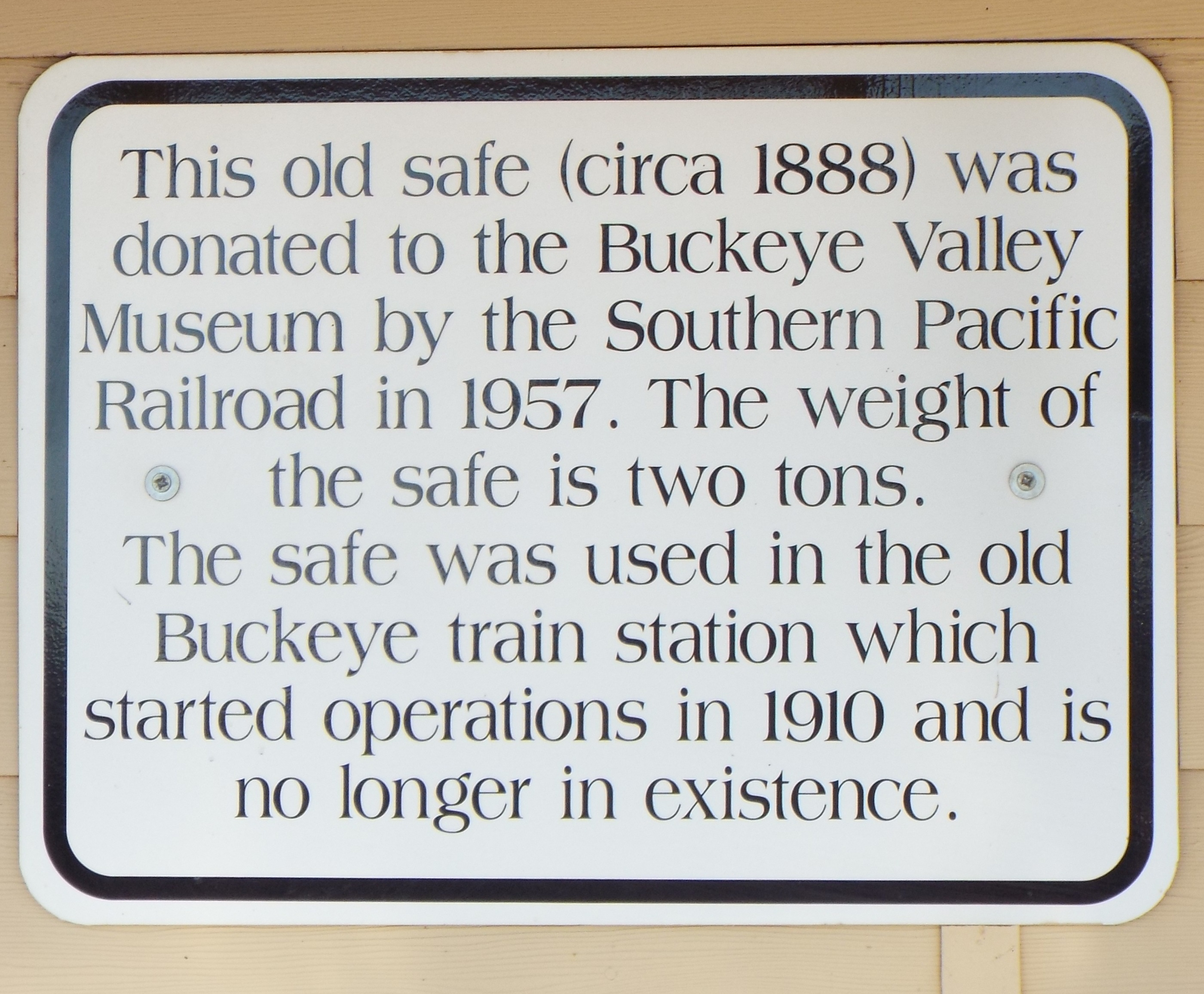
Old Historic Safe Marker.

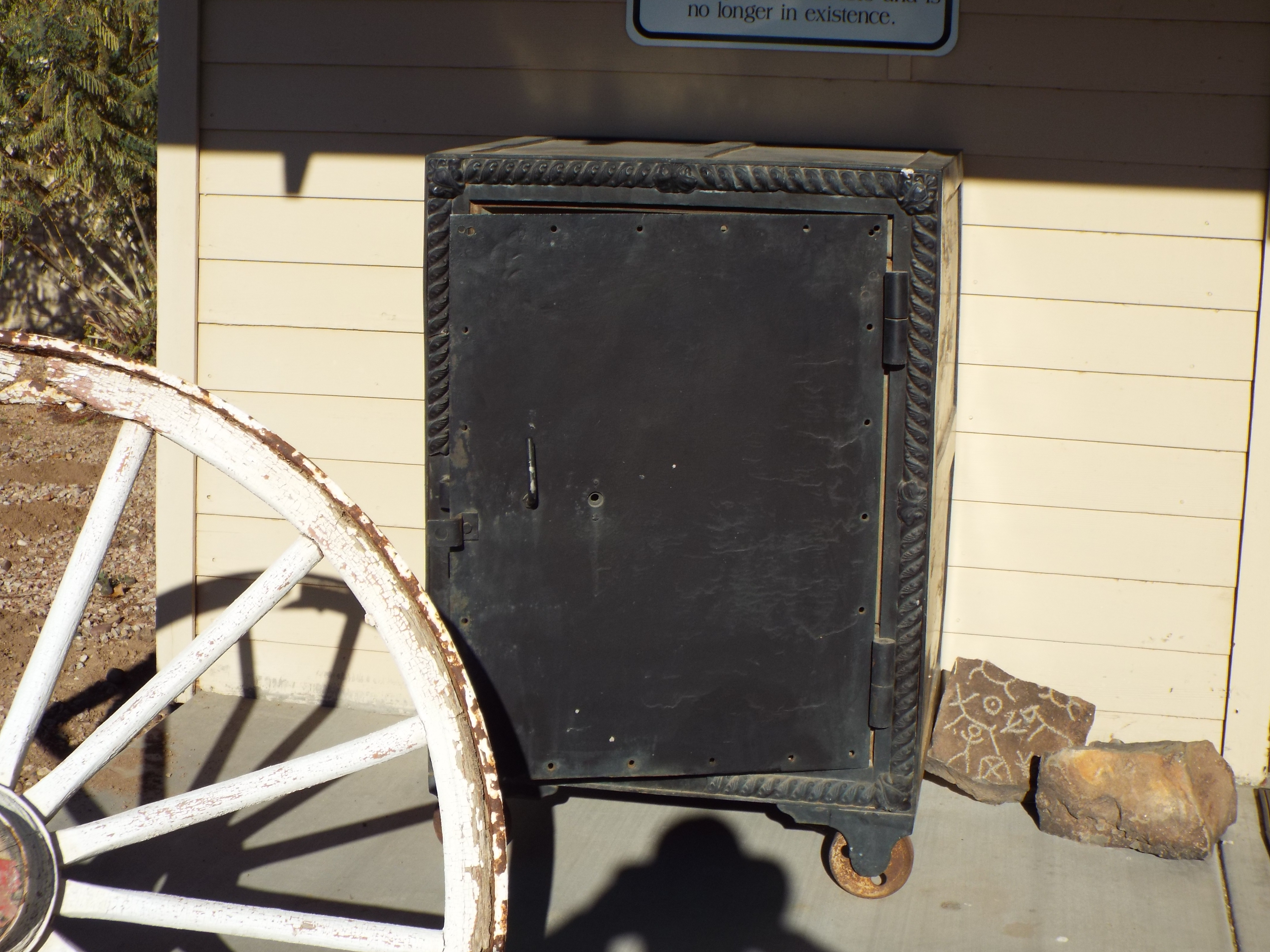
1888 safe once used in the Southern Pacific Railroad Station in Buckeye.

- The H.E. Kell and Co. General Merchandise Building – The structure was built in 1890 as a saloon and located on Centre Street. Centre Street was renamed and the building therefore is located at 116 E. MC 85. It now houses the Buckeye Valley Museum.
- The Benson/Raney House – The house, which was in a state of total abandonment, was built in 1895 and was located on Hazen Road and 4th Street.
- The Joslin Building – The structure was built in 1909 by Wallace Joslin and is located on the southeast corner of Monroe Ave. and 4th Street. The building has served as a hotel, a pharmacy and a Pay Less Groceries and Meats Market. It is listed as historical by the Buckeye Valley Historical and Archaeological Society.
- The Ware Building – The Ware Building was built in 1910 and is located on 104 South 4th Street. The corner of the building was occupied by the Buckeye Valley Bank in 1911.
- The Old Courthouse and Jail – This building was built in 1912 and is located at 218 S. 4th Street. Over the years the Courthouse and Jail has been used as a Hospital, the grade school auxiliary building, the town library and town food bank. The building still has the original jail bars on its windows. The Buckeye Valley Food Bank was founded by Hugh M. Watson, Buckeye's first mayor. Listed as historical by the Buckeye Valley Historical and Archaeological Society.
- Buckeye Pharmacy – The structure was built c.1920 and is located on Monroe Ave.
- Buckeye Union High School A-Wing – The A-Wing was built in 1925 and is located at 902 E. Eason Ave. The school A-wing was listed in the National Register of Historic Places on December 30, 2009, reference #09001160.
- Roosevelt Irrigation District Building – This structure was built in 1929 and is located on 103 West Baseline Road. The Roosevelt Irrigation District was organized in 1923 and the land served by the District is located north of the Buckeye Canal from Dysart Road to the Hassayampa River. The building has been used and continues to be used by the Roosevelt Irrigation District since 1929.
- West Valley Academy – The structure was built in 1930 and is located at 827 E. Monroe Ave. It originally was used as a church. Listed as historical by the Buckeye Valley Historical and Archaeological Society.
- The May Building – The building, which is also known as the "Urwiller Building", was built in 1931 and is located on 824 East Monroe Ave.
- Buckeye Women's Club – The Women's Club building was built on June 6, 1935, and is located at 845 East Monroe Ave. Listed as historical by the Buckeye Valley Historical and Archaeological Society. This property was listed in the National Register of Historic Places on June 4, 2021; reference #100006596.
- Ganley's Funeral Home – The funeral home was built in 1939 and is located on 104 East Baseline Road. It was on the second floor of this building that the planners of "Valencia", a town separated from Buckeye, had their office. However, despite all of their planning, the town of Valencia was never meant to be.
- The Millstone Café – The structure was built in 1944 and is located on 801 East Monroe Ave. in Buckeye, Arizona. The café catered mostly to the residents who served in World War II.
- Hobo Joe – Hobo Joe is a 25 foot tall Buckeye landmark created in 1965 and was located in front of Gillums Meat & Locker Co. at 1015 East Monroe Avenue. There is a dispute as to who was the sculptor. The identity of the sculptor is unknown and remains a mystery. The statue was purchased by the Buckeye's Main Street Coalition, who removed it and put it in storage. The statue underwent a process of a restoration makeover which included some fiberglass work, repainting and setting on a new base. The refurbished statue is now located at 111 S. 5th St.
- 1888 Safe – The safe that was once used in the Southern Pacific Railroad Station in Buckeye.
- Old Highway 80 – A historic road which passed through Arizona.
- Buckeye Municipal Airport's John C. Butler Memorial Field – The airport was once the United States Army Air Force's Luke Aux Field #5. Left are some of the aircraft of the World War II era.

=== Liberty ===
- Liberty Cemetery – The cemetery was established in 1885 and is located on South 207 Ave. in Buckeye, Arizona. This is the final resting place of many of Buckeye's pioneers. Among the graves in the cemetery are those of Thomas Newton (sometimes spelled "Newt") Clanton the founder of Buckeye and William "Bob" R. Beloat who was instrumental in organizing the Buckeye Irrigation Company. Beloat and his brother John assisted in turning the first water into the company ditch. There are also many graves without names and that of some pioneers who are not well known.
- Old Spain House (now Nardini Manor) – Joshua L. Spain and his family were among the first settlers of Buckeye. He was involved in "The development of the Buckeye canal and owned a large homestead. The house which he built, known as The Old Spain House", was built in 1886 and remodeled in 1912. It is located on 5601 S 195th Ave.
- Old Farm House – An old abandoned farm house built in 1900 on the Joshua L. Spain homestead.
- The Liberty Methodist Church and Memorial Hall – Both the church and memorial hall were built in 1903 and located on 19912 W. County Route 85 and the corner of South Liberty School Road, across the street from the historic Liberty School. The church was listed in the National Register of Historic Places on December 28, 2017, reference #100001752.
- Liberty School – The first schoolhouse in Buckeye was built in 1890, in the community of Liberty. It was built out of cottonwood on South Liberty School Road on the Southwest corner of Joshua L. Spain's homestead. A fire destroyed the building and new schoolhouse was built in its place in 1910. The building is currently being used, by the Liberty School District, as a classroom for music lessons. It is the oldest school building still in use in Arizona.

=== Palo Verde ===
- The Palo Verde Baptist Church – The church was built in 1890 and is located on 29600 West Old Hwy. 80.
- The Palo Verde Baptist Church Cemetery – The cemetery was established in 1903 and is located on 29600 West Old Hwy. 80. Among the graves in the cemetery is that of John G. Roberts one of the first settlers of Palo Verde who helped in the construction of the Arizona and Buckeye canal.

== Historic properties and structures in Buckeye and the Buckeye Valley ==
The following is a gallery with images of the historic structures in Buckeye and the communities of Liberty and Palo Verde which are located in the Buckeye Valley. Of the historic structures pictured only one, the Buckeye Union High School A-Wing, is listed in the National Register of Historic Places. Some of the historic properties have more than one image on this list and are pictured in different angles thereby giving a different architectural perspective of the property style and design.

Historic Properties in Buckeye

	Name	Image	Year		Name	Image	Year
1	H.E. Kell and Co. General Merchandise		1890	2	Benson/Raney House		1895
3	Joslin Building		1909	4	Ware Building		1910
5	Old Courthouse and Jail		1911	6	Buckeye Pharmacy		1920
7	Buckeye Union High School A-Wing		1925	8	Roosevelt Irrigation District Building		1929
9	West Valley Academy Building		1930	10	May Building (Urwiller Building)		1931
11	Buckeye Women's Club		1935	12	Ganley's Funeral Home		1939
13	Millstone Cafe		1944	14	Hobo Joe		1965
15	Old Highway 80 road sign on the historic road		1914	16	Buckeye Municipal Airport; John C. Butler Field		1942
17	John C. Butler Field; Fairchild C-119G Flying Boxcar N15501		1942	18	John C. Butler Field; B-25C Mitchell Bomber		1942

Historic Properties in Liberty

	Name	Image	Year		Name	Image	Year
1	Liberty Cemetery		1885	2	Grave of Thomas Newton Clanton		(1843–1926) B-8-5
3	Grave of William R Beloat		(1861–1954) A-5-4	4	Spain House (now Nardini Manor)		1886
5	Abandoned farm house on the Joshua L. Spain homestead.		1900	6	Liberty Methodist Church		1909
7	Liberty Methodist Church Memorial Hall.		1909	8	Liberty School		1910
9	Liberty School (angle view)		1910				

Historic Properties in Palo Verde

	Name	Image	Year		Name	Image	Year
1	Palo Verde Baptist Church		1890	2	Palo Verde Baptist Church Cemetery		1903
3	Grave of John G. Roberts		(1874–1954)	4	Historic Old Highway 80		1914

== See also ==
- National Register of Historic Places listings in Arizona
- National Register of Historic Places listings in Maricopa County, Arizona
