= Downtown Urbana Historic District =

Historic district in Illinois, United States

- U.S. National Register of Historic Places
- U.S. Historic district
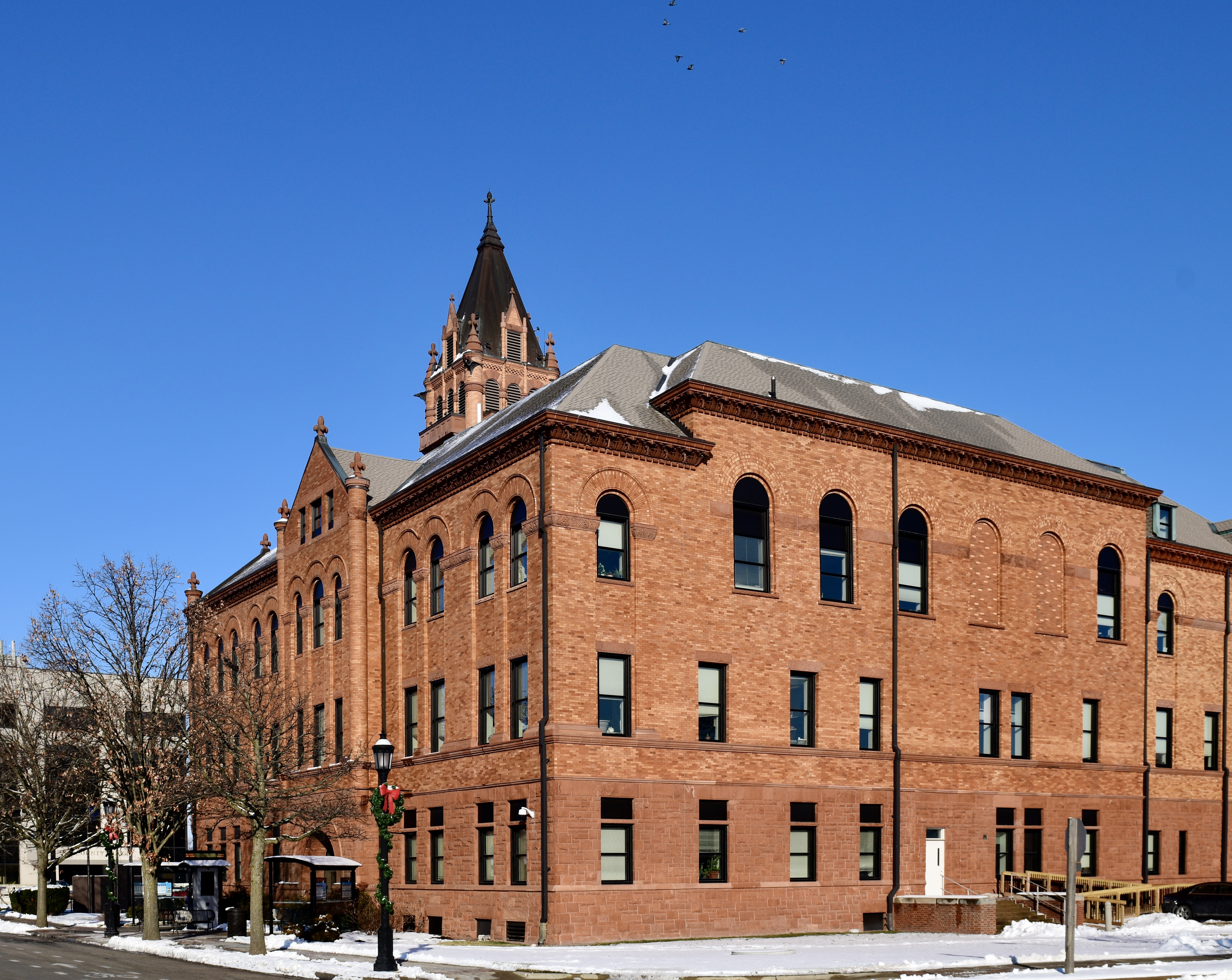
- Champaign County Courthouse

- Location within Illinois Location within the United States
- Location: Roughly bounded by Illinois, Walnut, Water, Goose Alley, and Cedar Sts., Urbana, Illinois
- Coordinates: 40°06′27″N 88°12′29″W
- Area: 32.7 acres (13.2 ha)
- NRHP reference No.: 100004308
- Added to NRHP: August 27, 2019

The Downtown Urbana Historic District is a commercial historic district encompassing seven city blocks in downtown Urbana, Illinois. The buildings in the district reflects downtown Urbana's development as the county seat of Champaign County and a regional commercial center. While Urbana was founded in the 1830s and began its development in the ensuing decades, the oldest buildings in the district are from the 1870s. The city expanded considerably in the late nineteenth and early to mid twentieth centuries, and most of the district's buildings were constructed during this period. Local architect Joseph Royer designed many of the district's most prominent buildings, including the 1901 Romanesque Revival Champaign County Courthouse.

The district was added to the National Register of Historic Places on August 27, 2019.
