= United States Post Office (Champaign, Illinois) =

- U.S. Post Office
- U.S. National Register of Historic Places
- Local Landmark
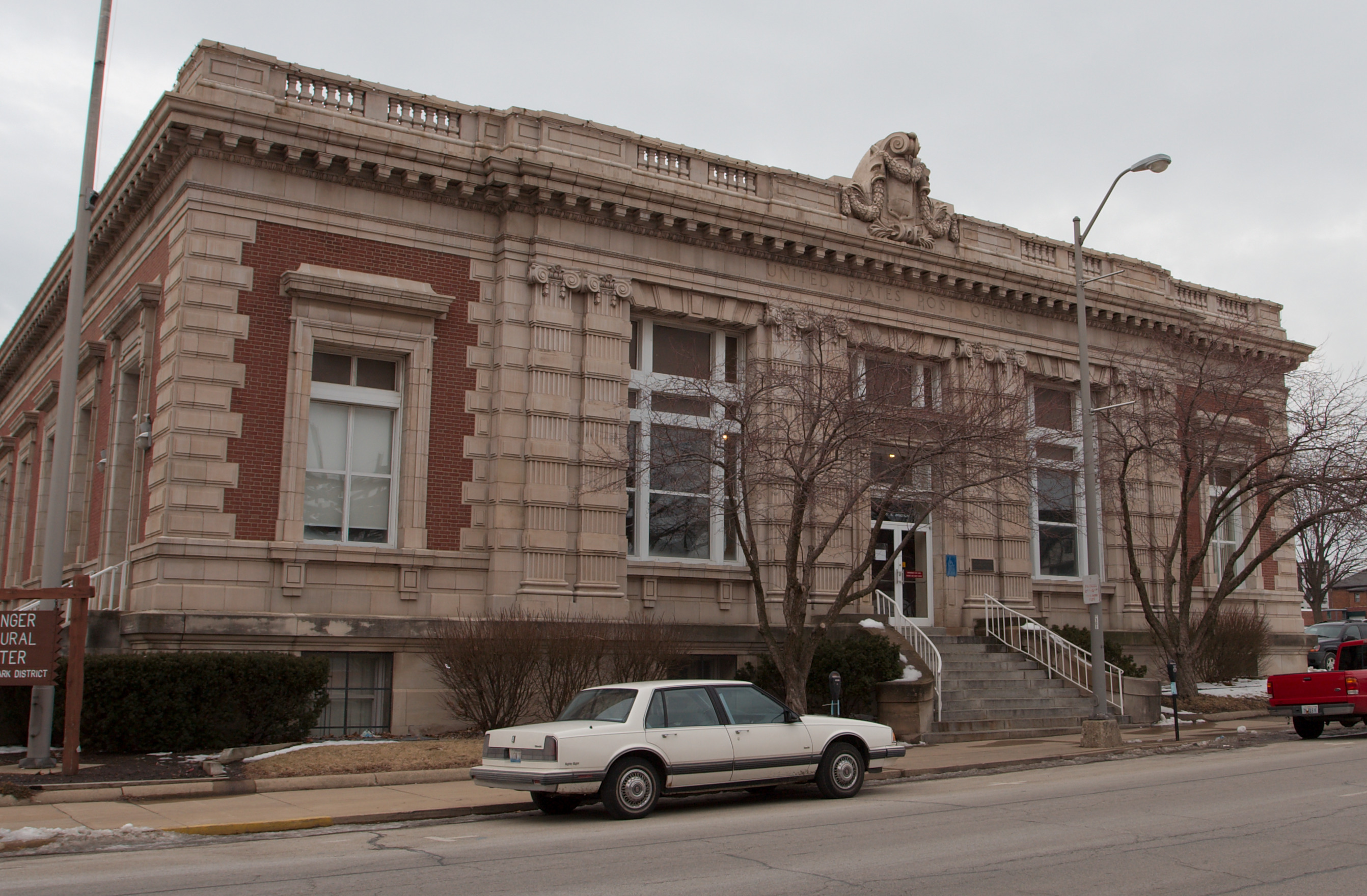

- Location within Illinois Location within the United States
- Location: Randolph and Church Sts., Champaign, Illinois
- Coordinates: 40°7′7″N 88°14′44″W
- Area: less than one acre
- Built: 1905
- Architect: Taylor, James Knox
- Architectural style: Beaux Arts
- NRHP reference No.: 76000684
- Added to NRHP: August 17, 1976

The U.S. Post Office, now known as the Springer Cultural Center, is a historic government building located at Randolph and Church Streets in Champaign, Illinois, United States. Built in 1905, the building originally served as Champaign's post office. The office of Supervising Architect James Knox Taylor designed the Beaux-Arts building. The brick building features extensive limestone and terra cotta ornamentation. The front facade has four pairs of Ionic pilasters separating the entrance and two sets of windows. A frieze reading "UNITED STATES POST OFFICE" and a dentillated cornice run above the pilasters. A balustrade runs along the front edge of the roof; a large scrolled cartouche marks the center of the balustrade. In 1966, the post office was converted to a federal building.

The building was listed on the National Register of Historic Places in 1976. It is also a Local Landmark.

It was deeded to the Champaign Park District in 1991.

== See also ==
- List of United States post offices
