= Lincoln Building (Champaign, Illinois) =

- U.S. National Register of Historic Places
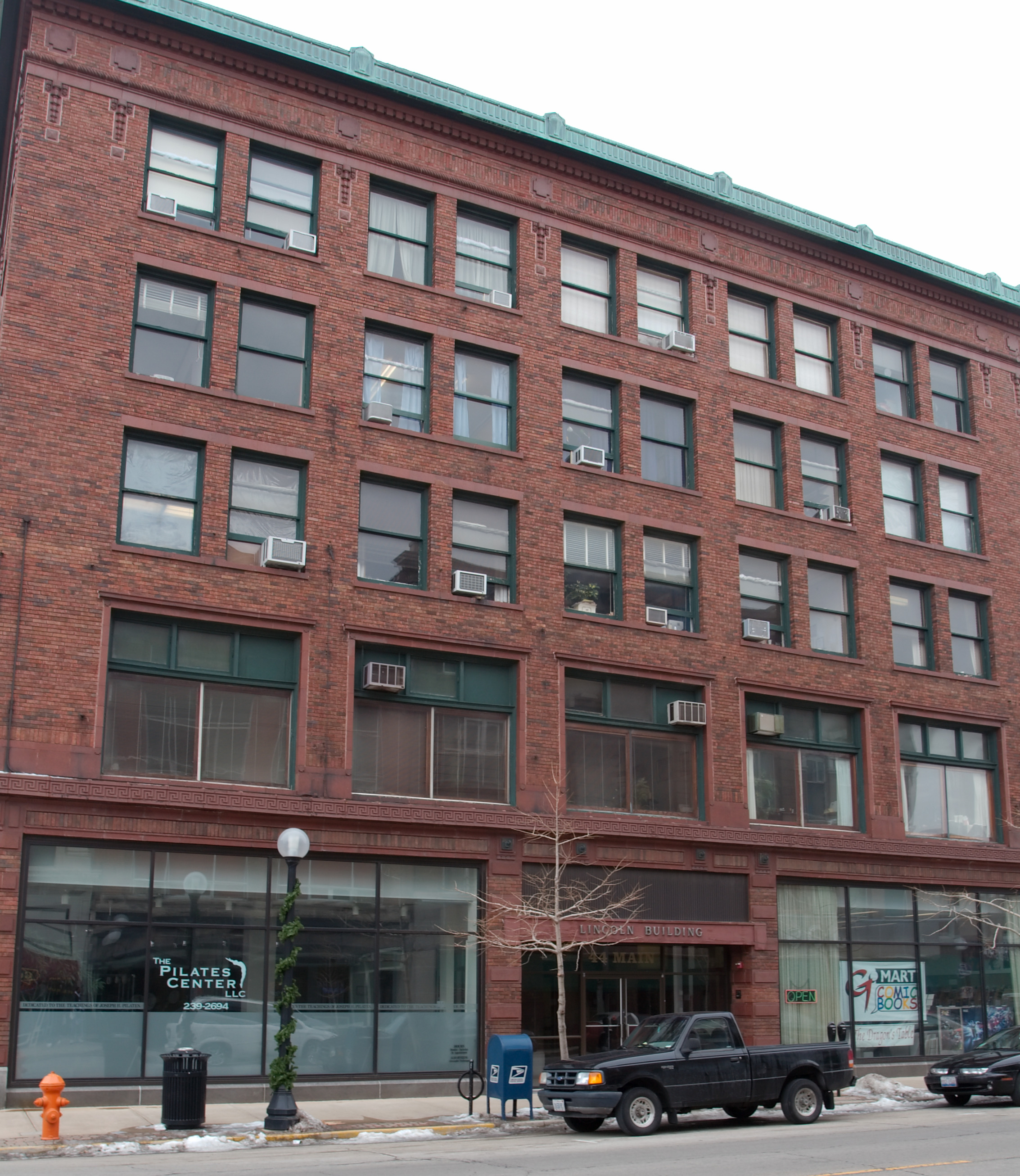

- Location within Illinois Location within the United States
- Location: 44 E. Main St., Champaign, Illinois
- Coordinates: 40°7′3″N 88°14′30″W
- Area: less than one acre
- Built: 1916
- Architect: Harry Roberts Temple
- Architectural style: Classical Revival, Chicago
- NRHP reference No.: 96000854
- Added to NRHP: August 1, 1996

The Lincoln Building is a historic commercial building located at 44 East Main Street in Champaign, Illinois.

== Description and history ==
Built in 1916, the five-story, Commercial style building was designed by architect Harry Roberts Temple. The five-story brick building features a copper cornice and terra cotta decorations. The building's facade is divided into a first-floor base, shaft, and capital at the top, a feature of Commercial style buildings modeled after Classical columns. The first two floors of the building feature large sash windows, with storefront windows on the first floor and display windows on the second; the upper stories have smaller double-hung sash windows. The building's interior features terrazzo floors, marble accents, and wood trim.

The building was listed on the National Register of Historic Places on August 1, 1996.
