= National Register of Historic Places listings in Champaign County, Illinois =

Location of Champaign County in Illinois

This is intended to be a complete list of the properties and districts on the National Register of Historic Places in Champaign County, Illinois, United States. Latitude and longitude coordinates are provided for many National Register properties and districts; these locations may be seen together in a map.

There are 60 properties and districts listed on the National Register in the county, and four former listings.

This National Park Service list is complete through NPS recent listings posted May 22, 2026.

== Current listings ==
	Name on the Register	Image	Date listed	Location	City or town	Description
1	Henry Ahrens House	Henry Ahrens House	November 22, 2011 (#11000845)	212 E. University Ave. 40°07′00″N 88°14′08″W	Champaign	
2	Alpha Delta Phi Fraternity House	Alpha Delta Phi Fraternity House	May 21, 1990 (#90000752)	310 E. John St. 40°06′33″N 88°14′02″W	Champaign	
3	Alpha Delta Pi Sorority House	Alpha Delta Pi Sorority House	November 8, 2000 (#00001333)	1202 W. Nevada St. 40°06′22″N 88°13′27″W	Urbana	
4	Alpha Gamma Delta Fraternity House	Alpha Gamma Delta Fraternity House	August 5, 2009 (#09000589)	1106 S. Lincoln Ave. 40°06′13″N 88°13′09″W	Urbana	
5	Alpha Phi Fraternity House-Beta Alpha Chapter	Alpha Phi Fraternity House-Beta Alpha Chapter	November 15, 2005 (#05001250)	508 E. Amory Ave. 40°06′27″N 88°13′52″W	Champaign	
6	Alpha Rho Chi Fraternity House	Alpha Rho Chi Fraternity House	May 23, 1997 (#97000460)	1108 S. First St. 40°06′16″N 88°14′18″W	Champaign	
7	Alpha Xi Delta Sorority Chapter House	Alpha Xi Delta Sorority Chapter House	August 28, 1989 (#89001110)	715 W. Michigan Ave. 40°06′05″N 88°13′06″W	Urbana	
8	Altgeld Hall, University of Illinois	Altgeld Hall, University of Illinois	April 17, 1970 (#70000229)	University of Illinois campus, corner of Wright and John Sts. 40°06′34″N 88°13′42″W	Urbana	
9	Beta Theta Pi Fraternity House	Beta Theta Pi Fraternity House	August 28, 1989 (#89001108)	202 E. Daniel St. 40°06′29″N 88°14′09″W	Champaign	
10	Building at 201 North Market Street	Building at 201 North Market Street	November 7, 1997 (#97001335)	201 N. Market St. 40°07′02″N 88°14′30″W	Champaign	
11	Building at 203–205 North Market Street	Building at 203–205 North Market Street	November 7, 1997 (#97001336)	203–205 N. Market St. 40°07′04″N 88°12′23″W	Champaign	
12	Burnham Athenaeum	Burnham Athenaeum	June 7, 1978 (#78001115)	306 W. Church St. 40°07′07″N 88°14′50″W	Champaign	
13	Cattle Bank	Cattle Bank	August 19, 1975 (#75000642)	102 E. University Ave. 40°07′00″N 88°14′19″W	Champaign	Now the Champaign County Historical Museum
14	Champaign Downtown Commercial District	Champaign Downtown Commercial District	January 24, 2020 (#100004912)	Former ICRR & Main St.; Neil St.; Taylor, Bailey, University; and ICRR; 40°07′02″N 88°14′32″W	Champaign	
15	Chanute Field Historic District	Chanute Field Historic District	July 14, 2006 (#06000594)	Rantoul National Aviation Center; 40°18′00″N 88°09′04″W	Rantoul	
16	Chemical Laboratory	Chemical Laboratory	November 19, 1986 (#86003148)	1305 W. Green St. 40°06′32″N 88°13′36″W	Urbana	
17	Delta Kappa Epsilon Fraternity House	Delta Kappa Epsilon Fraternity House	February 22, 1990 (#90000114)	313 E. John; 40°06′33″N 88°14′01″W	Champaign	
18	Delta Upsilon Fraternity House	Delta Upsilon Fraternity House	May 21, 1990 (#90000749)	312 E. Armory Ave. 40°06′20″N 88°14′02″W	Champaign	
19	Downtown Urbana Historic District	Downtown Urbana Historic District	August 27, 2019 (#100004308)	Roughly bounded by Illinois, Walnut, Water, Goose Alley, and Cedar Sts. 40°06′27″N 88°12′29″W	Urbana	
20	Elm Street Court	Elm Street Court	June 15, 2000 (#00000681)	1–8 Elm Street Court; 40°06′43″N 88°12′54″W	Urbana	
21	Mumford House	Mumford House	October 31, 1989 (#89001728)	1403 E. Lorado Taft Dr. 40°06′10″N 88°13′41″W	Urbana	Constructed in 1870 as a model farm house; the oldest building on the University's campus
22	Gamma Phi Beta Sorority House	Gamma Phi Beta Sorority House	October 28, 1994 (#94001270)	1110 W. Nevada; 40°06′21″N 88°13′21″W	Urbana	
23	The Georgian	The Georgian	November 15, 2005 (#05001260)	1005 S. Sixth St. 40°06′30″N 88°13′50″W	Champaign	
24	Greek Revival Cottage	Greek Revival Cottage	October 20, 1977 (#77000473)	303 W. University Ave. 40°06′57″N 88°12′37″W	Urbana	
25	Clark R. Griggs House	Clark R. Griggs House	November 30, 1978 (#78001116)	505 W. Main St. 40°06′48″N 88°12′49″W	Urbana	
26	Hazen Bridge	Hazen Bridge	May 6, 1994 (#94000433)	Newcomb Twp. Rd. 85 across the Sangamon R. 40°15′09″N 88°23′01″W	Mahomet	
27	Illinois Traction Building	Illinois Traction Building	September 20, 2006 (#86003782)	41 E. University Ave. 40°06′58″N 88°14′00″W	Champaign	
28	Inman Hotel	Inman Hotel	October 20, 1989 (#89001732)	17 E. University Ave. 40°06′58″N 88°14′32″W	Champaign	
29	Kappa Delta Rho Fraternity House	Kappa Delta Rho Fraternity House	May 21, 1990 (#90000750)	1110 S. Second St. 40°06′17″N 88°14′15″W	Champaign	
30	Kappa Kappa Gamma Sorority House	Kappa Kappa Gamma Sorority House	February 25, 2004 (#04000074)	1102 S. Lincoln Ave. 40°06′12″N 88°13′09″W	Urbana	
31	Kappa Sigma Fraternity House	Kappa Sigma Fraternity House	August 28, 1989 (#89001109)	212 E. Daniel St. 40°06′29″N 88°14′12″W	Champaign	
32	Library-University of Illinois at Urbana-Champaign	Library-University of Illinois at Urbana-Champaign	August 11, 2000 (#00000413)	1408 W. Gregory Dr. 40°06′18″N 88°13′43″W	Urbana	
33	Lincoln (Statue)	Lincoln (Statue)	March 10, 2004 (#04000144)	1000 Blk of S. Race St. 40°06′14″N 88°12′36″W	Urbana	
34	Lincoln Building	Lincoln Building	August 1, 1996 (#96000854)	44 E. Main St. 40°07′03″N 88°14′30″W	Champaign	
35	George and Elsie Mattis House	George and Elsie Mattis House	December 7, 2010 (#10000993)	900 W. Park Ave. 40°07′03″N 88°15′30″W	Champaign	
36	Metal Shop	Metal Shop	November 19, 1986 (#86003141)	102 S. Burrill Ave. 40°06′43″N 88°13′37″W	Urbana	Demolished 1993.
37	Military Drill Hall and Men's Gymnasium	Military Drill Hall and Men's Gymnasium	November 19, 1986 (#86003144)	1402–1406 W. Springfield; 40°06′46″N 88°13′40″W	Urbana	The "Military Drill Hall" is the Kenney Gym Annex (b.1890) and the "Men's Gymnasium" is the Kenney Gym (b.1902)
38	Morrow Plots, University of Illinois	Morrow Plots, University of Illinois	May 23, 1968 (#68000024)	Gregory Dr. at Matthews Ave. 40°06′16″N 88°13′33″W	Urbana	
39	Natural History Building	Natural History Building	November 9, 1986 (#86003147)	1301 W. Green St. 40°06′34″N 88°13′33″W	Urbana	
40	New Orpheum Theatre	New Orpheum Theatre	February 28, 1991 (#91000085)	346–352 N. Neil St. 40°07′10″N 88°14′33″W	Champaign	
41	Phi Delta Theta Fraternity House	Phi Delta Theta Fraternity House	February 25, 2004 (#04000070)	309 E. Chalmers St. 40°06′22″N 88°14′03″W	Champaign	
42	Phi Mu Sorority House	Phi Mu Sorority House	May 21, 1990 (#90000751)	706 W. Ohio St. 40°06′14″N 88°12′59″W	Urbana	
43	Nathan C. Ricker House	Nathan C. Ricker House	June 21, 2000 (#00000682)	612 W. Green St. 40°06′39″N 88°12′57″W	Urbana	
44	Joseph W. Royer House and Ella Danely Cottage		April 18, 2022 (#100007626)	801 West Oregon St. and 701 South Busey Ave. 40°06′26″N 88°13′04″W	Urbana	
45	Sigma Alpha Epsilon Fraternity House	Sigma Alpha Epsilon Fraternity House	February 22, 1990 (#90000113)	211 E. Daniel St. 40°06′28″N 88°14′08″W	Champaign	
46	Tina Weedon Smith Memorial Hall	Tina Weedon Smith Memorial Hall	February 29, 1996 (#96000097)	805 S. Mathews Ave. 40°06′20″N 88°13′33″W	Urbana	
47	Francis and Abbie Solon House	Francis and Abbie Solon House	July 3, 2007 (#07000644)	503 South State St. 40°06′41″N 88°14′49″W	Champaign	
48	Frederick Squires House	Frederick Squires House	November 22, 2011 (#11000846)	1003 W. Church St. 40°07′05″N 88°15′38″W	Champaign	
49	Stone Arch Bridge	Stone Arch Bridge	May 14, 1981 (#81000210)	Springfield Ave. and 2nd St. 40°06′46″N 88°14′14″W	Champaign	Now integrated into the Boneyard Creek Second Street Basin
50	U.S. Post Office	U.S. Post Office	August 17, 1976 (#76000684)	Randolph and Church Sts. 40°07′07″N 88°14′44″W	Champaign	
51	Unitarian Church of Urbana	Unitarian Church of Urbana	May 13, 1991 (#91000572)	1209 W. Oregon St. 40°06′24″N 88°13′30″W	Urbana	Now the Channing-Murray Foundation, includes Unitarian-Universalist chapel and vegetarian restaurant
52	University of Illinois Astronomical Observatory	University of Illinois Astronomical Observatory	November 6, 1986 (#86003155)	901 S. Mathews Ave. 40°06′18″N 88°13′34″W	Urbana	
53	University of Illinois Experimental Dairy Farm Historic District	University of Illinois Experimental Dairy Farm Historic District	February 4, 1994 (#94000030)	1201 W. St. Mary's Rd. 40°05′38″N 88°13′28″W	Urbana	
54	Urbana-Lincoln Hotel-Lincoln Square Mall	Urbana-Lincoln Hotel-Lincoln Square Mall	September 8, 2006 (#06000778)	300 S. Broadway Ave. 40°06′38″N 88°12′26″W	Urbana	Hotel is now (2013) "Urbana Landmark Hotel"
55	Virginia Theatre	Virginia Theatre	November 28, 2003 (#03001201)	203 W. Park Ave. 40°07′01″N 88°14′42″W	Champaign	
56	Vriner's Confectionery	Vriner's Confectionery	May 9, 1983 (#83000305)	55 Main St. 40°07′03″N 88°14′27″W	Champaign	
57	Warm Air Research House	Warm Air Research House	June 12, 2001 (#01000595)	1108 W. Stoughton St. 40°06′48″N 88°13′23″W	Urbana	
58	Wee Haven	Wee Haven	December 15, 2011 (#11000906)	1509 W. Park Ave. 40°07′02″N 88°16′17″W	Champaign	
59	Women's Gymnasium, University of Illinois at Urbana-Champaign	Women's Gymnasium, University of Illinois at Urbana-Champaign	February 5, 2003 (#02001751)	906 S Goodwin Ave. 40°06′24″N 88°13′27″W	Urbana	
60	Women's Residence Hall-West Residence Hall, University of Illinois at Urbana-Champaign	Women's Residence Hall-West Residence Hall, University of Illinois at Urbana-Champaign	February 5, 2003 (#02001752)	1111 W. Nevada St. 40°06′27″N 88°13′28″W	Urbana	

== Former listings ==
	Name on the Register	Image	Date listed	Date removed	Location	City or town	Description
1	Ater-Jaques House		August 1, 1996 (#96000855)	March 14, 2002	207 W. Elm Street	Urbana	Demolished in 1999
2	Bailey-Rugg Building	Bailey-Rugg Building	November 7, 1997 (#97001337)	January 2, 2020	219–225 N. Neil St. 40°07′05″N 88°14′37″W	Champaign	Destroyed by fire, November 7, 2008
3	Chi Psi Fraternity House		February 22, 1990 (#90000115)	April 17, 2003	912 S. Second Street	Champaign	Demolished in 1994
4	Mahomet Graded School		December 2, 1987 (#87002035)	December 8, 1995	Main St.	Mahomet	Demolished August 1988. Also known as Sangamon School.

== See also ==
- List of National Historic Landmarks in Illinois
- National Register of Historic Places listings in Illinois
