= List of works by Howard Van Doren Shaw =

This is a list of houses, churches, commercial buildings, factories, and other structures by architect Howard Van Doren Shaw. Many of his buildings are now listed on the National Register of Historic Places (NRHP), either individually or as a contributing property to a historic district.

== Legend ==
Demolished or destroyed.

Disputed authorship (unverified Shaw design)

== List of works ==
Completed Works table
Name	City	State/Country	Built	Other Information	Image
M. D. Wells House	Lakeville	Connecticut	Before 1891		
Goodspeed Publishing Company Building	The Loop, Chicago	Illinois	1891		
Lowe House	Fitchburg	Massachusetts	1891		
Shaw–Atkinson Houses	Kenwood, Chicago	Illinois	1894		
Enterprise Building	The Loop, Chicago	Illinois	1895		
Henry Thompson House	Hyde Park, Chicago	Illinois	1895		
Broadlea Playhouse	Lake Forest	Illinois	1896		
Cornelia McLaury House	Kenwood, Chicago	Illinois	1896		
Charles Howard ReQua House	Near West Side, Chicago	Illinois	1896		
Charles A. Starkweather House	Near South Side, Chicago	Illinois	1896		
Washington Avenue House #1	Kenwood, Chicago	Illinois	1896		
Washington Avenue House #2	Kenwood, Chicago	Illinois	1896		
Little Orchard	Lake Forest	Illinois	1897		
George Edgar Vincent House	Hyde Park, Chicago	Illinois	1897		
John Dorr Bradley House	Lake Forest	Illinois	1898		
Dr. William Evans Casselberry House	Lake Forest	Illinois	1898		
Dr. Nathan Smith Davis House	Lake Forest	Illinois	1898		
Ragdale	Lake Forest	Illinois	1898	Listed on the NRHP on June 3, 1976	
Wenban House	Lake Forest	Illinois	1898		
Lakeside Press Building	The Loop, Chicago	Illinois	1899	Listed on the NRHP on June 23, 1976	
W. E. Kelley House	Oconomowoc	Wisconsin	1899		
George R. Thorne House	Midlothian	Illinois	1899	Collaboration with N. Max Dunning. Listed on the NRHP on May 2, 1997	
Dr. G. Lilley House	Hinsdale	Illinois	1900		
Second Presbyterian Church	Near South Side, Chicago	Illinois	1900	Remodel. Listed on the NRHP on December 27, 1974. Named a National Historic Landmark February 27, 2013.	
Louis F. Swift House, Westleigh	Lake Forest	Illinois	1900	Listed on the NRHP on November 18, 2005	
Eiger Building	Near South Side, Chicago	Illinois	1901		
Henneberry Press Building	The Loop, Chicago	Illinois	1901		
Onwentsia Club stable	Lake Forest	Illinois	1901		
John A. Putnam House	Highland Park	Illinois	1901	Unconfirmed design. Attributed by oral history	
Thorneycote	Highland Park	Illinois	1901	Unconfirmed design. Attributed by oral history	
Charles A. Starkweather House	Kenwood, Chicago	Illinois	1902		
John B. Drake House	Near South Side, Chicago	Illinois	1903		
W. S. Jackman House	Hyde Park, Chicago	Illinois	1903		
Morris S. Rosenwald House	Kenwood, Chicago	Illinois	1913		
Ralph Martin Shaw House	Near South Side, Chicago	Illinois	1903		
Heinrich Maschke House	Hyde Park, Chicago	Illinois	1904	Also known as the Oskar Bolza House	
Arthur J. Mason House	Hyde Park, Chicago	Illinois	1904		
James Henry Breasted House	Hyde Park, Chicago	Illinois	1904		
Arthur Baldulf House	Highland Park	Illinois	1905		
Misses Catherine and Jessie Colvin House	Lake Forest	Illinois	1905		
Decorator's Building	Chicago	Illinois	1905		
Charles Garfield King House	Lake Forest	Illinois	1905		
Joseph Medill Patterson House	Libertyville	Illinois	1905		
B. Albert Streich House	Hyde Park, Chicago	Illinois	1905		
Edward L. Baker House	Lake Forest	Illinois	1905		
Alburgh–Dover Company	South Lawndale, Chicago	Illinois	1906		
O. Bulza House	Austin, Chicago	Illinois	1906		
E. F. Bullard House	Jacksonville	Illinois	1906		
Augustus A. Carpenter House	Lake Forest	Illinois	1906		
Wallace L. DeWolf House	Lake Forest	Illinois	1906		
Edgar Johnson Goodspeed House	Hyde Park, Chicago	Illinois	1906		
Albert Martin Kales House	Winnetka	Illinois	1906		
Kent House	Jacksonville	Illinois	1906		
Lyons House	Unknown	Illinois	1906		
Mentor Building II	The Loop, Chicago	Illinois	1906		
Dr. Parmenter House	Lake Forest	Illinois	1906		
Edward F. Swift House, Villa Hortensia	Lake Geneva	Wisconsin	1906		
Adolphus Clay Bartlett House	Lake Geneva	Wisconsin	1907		
Frederic Clay Bartlett Studio	Chicago	Illinois	1907		
Harry M. Capps House	Jacksonville	Illinois	1907		
Hubbard Foster Carpenter House, Rehoboth	Lake Geneva	Wisconsin	1907		
James H. Douglas House	Kenwood, Chicago	Illinois	1907		
Charles Scribner Eaton House	Hyde Park, Chicago	Illinois	1907		
Charles Fernald House	Lake Forest	Illinois	1908		
Ginn & Company Publishers	Near South Side, Chicago	Illinois	1907		
Mrs. W. D. Jackman House	Hyde Park, Chicago	Illinois	1907		
George Ryerson Thorne House	Lake Forest	Illinois	1907		
Joseph T. Ryerson & Son	North Lawndale, Chicago	Illinois	1907		
Edward Larned Ryerson Sr House, Havenwood I	Lake Forest	Illinois	1906		
B. F. Goodrich Company Building	Manhattan, New York City	New York	1909	At 1780 Broadway; designed in association with architects D. Everett Waid and Arthur Ebbs Willauer operating as Waid and Willauer at the time; only the façade of the building remains after the erection of the Central Park Tower above it	
Edward Larned Ryerson Sr House, Havenwood II	Lake Forest	Illinois	1912		
Leverett Thompson House	Lake Forest	Illinois	1907		
Henry Veeder House	Kenwood, Chicago	Illinois	1907		
Benjamin E. Bensinger House	Glencoe	Illinois	1908		
Brucemore	Cedar Rapids	Iowa	1908	Remodel. Listed on the NRHP on December 12, 1976	
Cliff Dwellers Club	The Loop, Chicago	Illinois	1908		
Hugh Johnston McBirney House, House of the Four Winds	Lake Forest	Illinois	1908		
Prentiss Loomis Coonley House	Lake Forest	Illinois	1911		
Victor Elting House	Wilmette	Illinois	1908		
Glen Rowan	Lake Forest	Illinois	1908		
John Louis Hardin House	Winnetka	Illinois	1908		
Louis C. Huesmann House	Indianapolis	Indiana	1908		
Villa Ensor	Highland Park	Illinois	1908		
303 Ravine Drive	Highland Park	Illinois	1908	Undocumented Colonial Georgian revival landscaped by Jens Jensen. On the Highland Park Hazel–Ravine Historical Walking Tour (stop #26). Majestically sited on an acre adjacent to the ravines. 1 2	
Finley Barrell House	Lake Forest	Illinois	1909		
Walter D. Douglas House, Walden	Deephaven	Minnesota	1909		
Durand Commons	Lake Forest	Illinois	1909		
William Rainey Harper House	Hyde Park, Chicago	Illinois	1909		
Homewood Country Club	Flossmoor	Illinois	1909		
W. B. Pettibone House	Evanston	Illinois	1909		
REO Automobile Company Building	Near South Side, Chicago	Illinois	1909	Also known as the Sperling & Linden Building	
Robert Centennial Schaffner House	Highland Park	Illinois	1909		
Bertram Welton Sippy House	Hyde Park, Chicago	Illinois	1909		
John Merlin Powis Smith House	Hyde Park, Chicago	Illinois	1909		
Carl E. Williams House	Evanston	Illinois	1909		
Memorial Hall	Racine	Wisconsin	1909		
John Rogerson Montgomery House	Glencoe	Illinois	1909	Listed on the NRHP on September 15, 2004	
1130 N. Lake Shore Drive	Near North Side, Chicago	Illinois	1910		
Samuel Dauchy House	Lake View, Chicago	Illinois	1910		
Cecil D. Gregg House	Clayton	Missouri	1910		
Thomas A. Griffin House	Near North Side, Chicago	Illinois	1910		
Henry Hoyt Hilton House	Hyde Park, Chicago	Illinois	1910		
Louis B. Kuppernheimer House	Winnetka	Illinois	1910		
E. Norman Scott House	Lake Forest	Illinois	1910		
William Pratt Sidley House	Winnetka	Illinois	1910		
Albert Arnold Sprague House II	Lake Forest	Illinois	1910		
Stanley Stoner House	St. Louis	Missouri	1910		
Thomas Edward Wilson House	Kenwood, Chicago	Illinois	1910		
A. A. Brewster	Akron	Ohio	1911		
Thomas E. Donnelley House	Lake Forest	Illinois	1911		
C. Warren Fairbanks House	Indianapolis	Indiana	1911		
William O. Goodman House	Near North Side, Chicago	Illinois	1911		
Charles Henry Hermann House	Glencoe	Illinois	1911		
Lake Shore Country Club	Glencoe	Illinois	1911		
Morris S. Rosenfield House	Douglas, Chicago	Illinois	1911		
Frederick Jones Volney Skiff House	Kenilworth	Illinois	1911		
Charles A. Stonehill House	Glencoe	Illinois	1911		
Ira Edward Wight House	St. Louis	Missouri	1911		
Charles C. Bovey House	Minneapolis	Minnesota	1912		
Walter Stanton Brewster House, Covin Tree	Lake Forest	Illinois	1907		
Henry Faurot House	Riverside	Illinois	1912		
John L. Fortune House	Near North Side, Chicago	Illinois	1912		
Havenwood	Lake Forest	Illinois	1912		
Lewis Edward Myers House	Lake Geneva	Wisconsin	1912		
Nyberg Automobile Works	Near South Side, Chicago	Illinois	1912		
I. Newton Perry House	Lake Forest	Illinois	1912		
Arthur Hudson Marks House, Elmcourt	Akron	Ohio	1912		
Sturnowzy	Lake Forest	Illinois	1912		
Benjamin Carpenter House	Near North Side, Chicago	Illinois	1913		
G. W. French House, West Hill House	Riverdale	Iowa	1913		
Clayton Mark House	Lake Forest	Illinois	1914		
Cyrus Mark House	Evanston	Illinois	1913		
Edward Morris House	Kenwood, Chicago	Illinois	1913		
Edwin C. Shaw House	Akron	Ohio	1913		
Albert Edward Thompson House	Duluth	Minnesota	1913		
B. F. Goodrich Rubber Company	Akron	Ohio	1914		
National Cash Register Company Building	The Loop, Chicago	Illinois	1914		
Fourth Presbyterian Church of Chicago	Near North Side, Chicago	Illinois	1914	Designed the parish house, sanctuary by Cram, Goodhue, and Ferguson. Listed on the NRHP on September 5, 1975	
Bertram G. Work House	Akron	Ohio	1914		
Lester Armour House	Lake View, Chicago	Illinois	1915		
Wogden	Lake Forest	Illinois	1915		
George Pick House	Highland Park	Illinois	1915	Listed on the NRHP on September 29, 1982	
Harry A. Swiggert House	Evanston	Illinois	1915		
Montgomery A. Ward House	Flossmoor	Illinois	1915		
William E. Crow House	Lake Forest	Illinois	1916		
William Vallandingham Kelley House, Stonebridge	Lake Bluff	Illinois	1916		
Krafts Drug Store	Lake Forest	Illinois	1916	Renovation	
Market Square	Lake Forest	Illinois	1916		
F. P. Ross House	Evanston	Illinois	1916		
Thornedale	Lake Forest	Illinois	1916		
191 E. Walton Place	Near North Side, Chicago	Illinois	1917		
Eleanor Robinson Countiss House	Gold Coast, Chicago	Illinois	1917		
Erskine House	South Bend	Indiana	1917		
William Goodman Memorial at Graceland Cemetery	Uptown, Chicago	Illinois	1917		
Marktown	Whiting	Indiana	1917	Planned community. Listed on the NRHP on February 20, 1975	
Camp–Woods	Villanova	Pennsylvania	1917	Listed on the NRHP on September 1, 1983	
The Codlins	Bloomfield Hills	Michigan	1918		
P. E. Waller House	Kewanee	Illinois	1918		
M. A. Herske House	Hyde Park, Chicago	Illinois	1919		
Stone Street Apartments	Near North Side, Chicago	Illinois	1919		
First Presbyterian Church and Manse	Forsyth	Montana	1920	Collaboration with McIver & Cohagen. Listed on the NRHP on February 12, 1990	
Fountain of Time Reflecting Pool	Washington Park, Chicago	Illinois	1920		
William Nelson Pelouze House	Lake Geneva	Wisconsin	1920		
Quadrangle Club at the University of Chicago	Hyde Park, Chicago	Illinois	1920		
A. G. Becker Property	Highland Park	Illinois	1921	Listed on the NRHP on November 15, 1984	
Kappa Kappa Gamma Sorority House	Urbana	Illinois	1921	Listed on the NRHP on February 25, 2004	
Mayslake Peabody Estate Service Group	Oak Brook	Illinois	1921		
Burnham Library at the Art Institute of Chicago	The Loop, Chicago	Illinois	1922		
Phi Delta Theta Fraternity House	Champaign	Illinois	1922	Listed on the NRHP on February 25, 2004	
Phi Kappa Psi Fraternity House	Hyde Park, Chicago	Illinois	1922		
Charles Stinson Pillsbury House	Minneapolis	Minnesota	1922		
Pullman Press Building	Pullman, Chicago	Illinois	1922		
R. R. Donnelly & Sons Company building	Crawfordsville	Indiana	1922		
James Otis Hinckley House	Lake Forest	Illinois	1923		
Clarence Hopkins King House	St. Louis	Missouri	1923		
Methodist Episcopal Church	Lake Forest	Illinois	1923		
University Church of the Disciples of Christ	Hyde Park, Chicago	Illinois	1923	Collaboration with Henry K. Holsman	
John P. Wilson, Jr. House	Near North Side, Chicago	Illinois	1923		
2450 N. Lakeview Ave.	Lincoln Park, Chicago	Illinois	1924		
McKinlock Court at the Art Institute of Chicago	The Loop, Chicago	Illinois	1924		
Pullman Trust & Savings Bank	Pullman, Chicago	Illinois	1924		
Theodore Thomas Memorial	The Loop, Chicago	Illinois	1924		
Robert P. Lamont House, West View Farms]]	Lake Forest	Illinois	1924	Listed on the NRHP on November 12, 1993	
Bird Center	Lake Forest	Illinois	1925		
French Hall (St. Luke's Hospital)	Davenport	Iowa	1925	Torn down in the 1980s to make way for a parking ramp.	
Goodman Theatre	The Loop, Chicago	Illinois	1925		
Knollwood Country Club	Lake Forest	Illinois	1925		
Joel Spitz House	Glencoe	Illinois	1925		
Asa Wallace House	St. Louis	Missouri	1925		
Dr. Edgar R. Borly House	South Bend	Indiana	1926		
Customhouse Watchtower	Nassau	Bahamas	1926		
East Hill House and Carriage House	Riverdale	Iowa	1926	Listed on the NRHP on November 22, 1999	
French Hall For Nurses	Davenport	Iowa	1926		
Morse Dell Plain House and Garden	Hammond	Indiana	1926	Listed on the NRHP on April 1, 1998	
United States Memorial Chapel	Brest	France	1926		
William E. Hall House	Evanston	Illinois	1927	Completed after death	
Oscar Heinman House	Lake View, Chicago	Illinois	1928	Completed after death	
R.R. Donnelley and Sons Co. Calumet Plant	Near South Side, Chicago	Illinois	1929	Completed after death. Listed on the NRHP on February 17, 1983	
