= Greek Revival Cottage =

Greek Revival Cottage may refer to:

- Greek Revival Cottage (Cambridge, Massachusetts), listed on the NRHP in Massachusetts
- Greek Revival Cottage (Urbana, Illinois), listed on the National Register of Historic Places in Champaign County, Illinois
