= Elm Court =

Elm Court may refer to:

- Elm Court (Lenox and Stockbridge, Massachusetts), straddles Lenox/Stockbridge line, is listed on the NRHP in Massachusetts
- Elm Court (Butler, Pennsylvania), listed on the NRHP in Butler County, Pennsylvania
- Elm Court (Newport, Rhode Island), a Gilded Age mansion in Newport.
- Elm Street Court, Urbana, Illinois
