= Tina Weedon Smith Memorial Hall =

- U.S. National Register of Historic Places
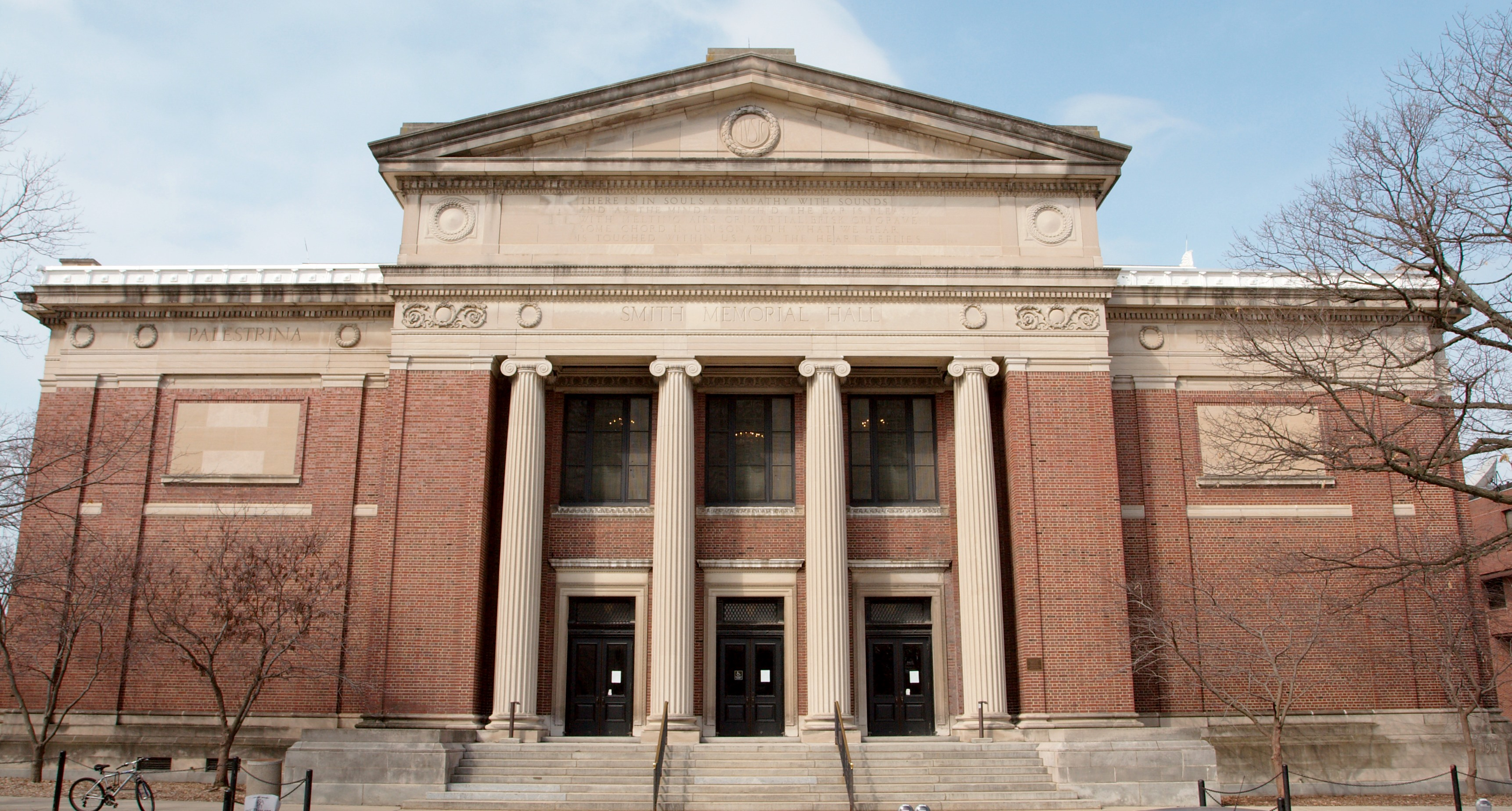
- (2008)

- Location within Illinois Location within the United States
- Location: 805 S. Mathews Ave. Urbana, Illinois
- Coordinates: 40°6′20″N 88°13′33″W
- Area: less than one acre
- Built: 1917-20
- Architect: James M. White; George E. Wright
- Architectural style: Beaux-Arts
- NRHP reference No.: 96000097
- Added to NRHP: February 29, 1996

Tina Weedon Smith Memorial Hall, located at 805 S. Mathews Avenue in Urbana, Illinois, is an historic building on the campus of the University of Illinois at Urbana-Champaign. Smith Hall is located just off the main quad of campus and is just east of Foellinger Auditorium. The building was constructed in 1917-21 and was designed in the Beaux-Arts style by James M. White and George E. Wright.

Smith Hall is known for being the first building on the campus to be completely funded by a private party donation. It was dedicated to Tina Weedon Smith by her husband, Captain Thomas J. Smith. Smith Hall is used for university lectures and music classes, as well as for speakers and performances.

In 1996 Smith Memorial Hall was added to the National Register of Historic Places in Illinois.

== History ==
On August 14, 1913, Captain Thomas J. Smith wrote a letter to Captain Edward Bailey stating that Smith intended to donate about $200,000 to the University of Illinois to build a music building in memory of his wife, Tina Weedon Smith. Captain Smith had been a member of the board of trustees from 1897 to 1903. Smith donated land and money that totaled approximately $480,500 to pay for the building construction.

Construction on Smith Memorial Hall began on November 9, 1917 when Captain Thomas J. Smith laid the cornerstone. Materials used during the construction were large amounts of stone, brick, metal, and limestone. The building was designed in the Beaux-Arts architecture style by James McLaren White, a professor at the University, and George E. Wright. Final construction on the building was completed in 1920.

A 30 percent expansion of the building was in the original plans and was also shown on campus maps until 1930. However, in 1931 the proposed expansion to the building was dropped and the maps never showed the expansion again.

== Groundbreaking ceremony ==
According to the Daily Illini newspaper, the groundbreaking ceremony for Smith Memorial Hall took place on Tuesday October 24, 1916. Captain Thomas J. Smith and President James of the University used a spade to break the ground at the site of construction. The spade, covered in University of Illinois colors, was given to Captain Smith after the ceremony. Captain Smith also gave a speech to the crowd of spectators, faculty, students, trustees, and Glee Club members. During the address, Captain Smith said, "I determined that I would cause to be erected a building to her memory and present the same to the University of Illinois, dedicated to the cause of music for the use of the University musical college for the advancement of the science and art of music, with the hope that it would in a measure bless mankind. From that time I have lived an economical life, to the end that I might be able to contribute to the erection of such a building as would be a credit alike to the memory of the departed loved one and to the University." The speech was followed by a performance by the University Glee Club.

Excavation of the land was to be completed within thirty days of the groundbreaking ceremony. The contract was held by Wager & Company of Champaign-Urbana.

== Description ==
Smith Memorial Hall houses many different musical performance and practice rooms, the largest of which is the large performance hall, which seats 650 in the orchestra and 450 in the balcony. The acoustics of the large performance hall are controlled by having a period of reverberation of 1.75 seconds when at full capacity, and having provisions in the design to decrease the period of reverberation when the hall was empty. The building also has a number of practice rooms, including seven studios and two classrooms on the first floor, and an additional 11 studios and 49 practice rooms on the second floor. The second floor is also home to a 200-person lecture room. The third floor of the hall houses another additional 47 practice rooms. Smith Memorial Hall also boasts a 900-person recital room lined with detailed mahogany woodwork throughout. This recital hall is where the three manual Casavant Frères organ is located.

The Memorial Room of the Smith Memorial Hall is a lavishly decorated drawing room, with crystal chandeliers. It is often used for chamber music performances and student recitals.

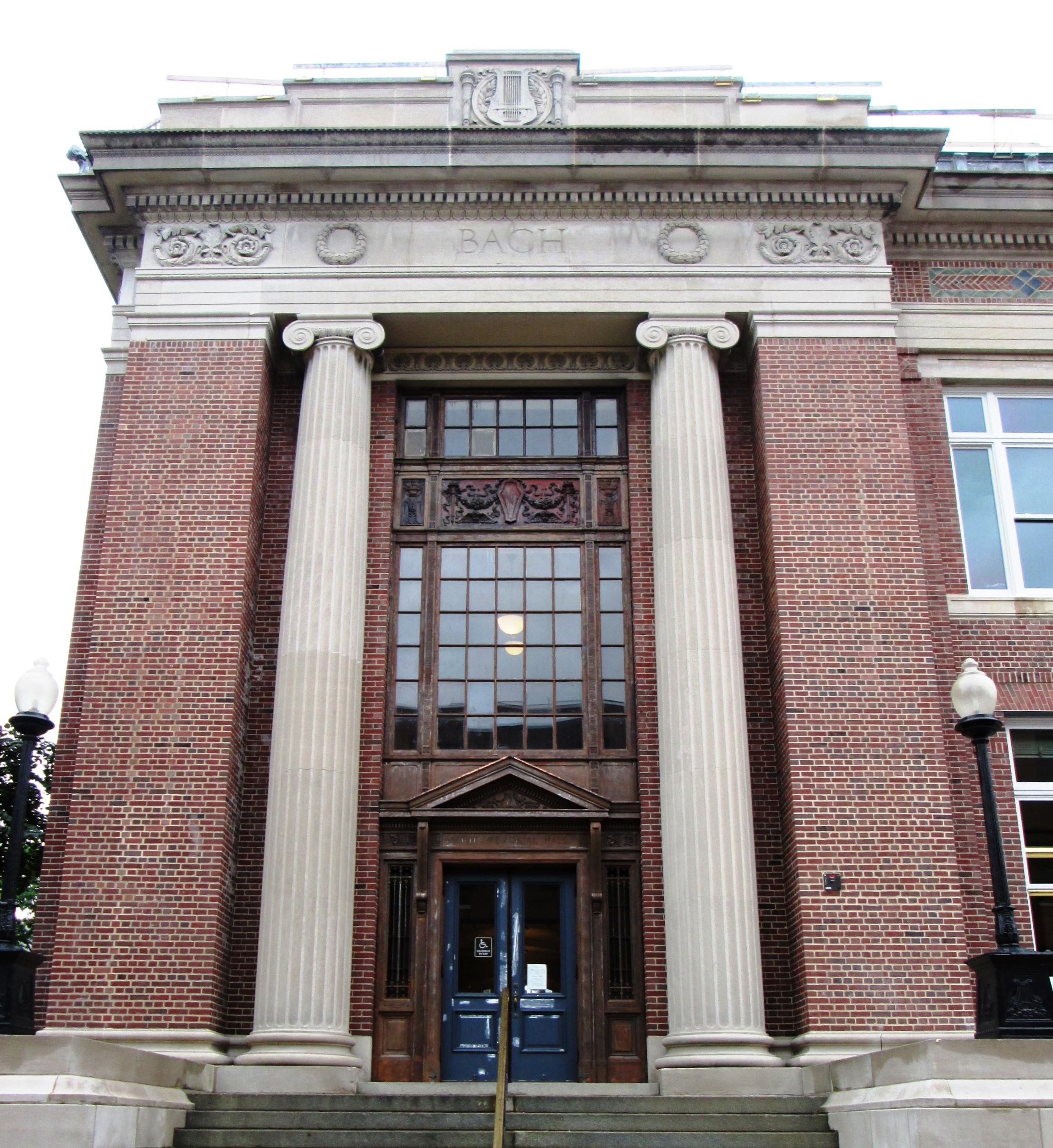
North side entrance to the building

== Current uses ==
Smith Memorial Hall is now used for musical practices and recitals. The building's large lecture rooms are used regularly, and the small rooms throughout the hall are used by university musicians for teaching and practice. The lecture halls are also used for musical recitals and performances. Many recitals are played in the hall every year, including harpsichord recitals, Doctor of Musical Arts recitals, and performances by university music students and jazz bands.
