= George and Elsie Mattis House =

Historic house in Illinois, United States

- U.S. National Register of Historic Places
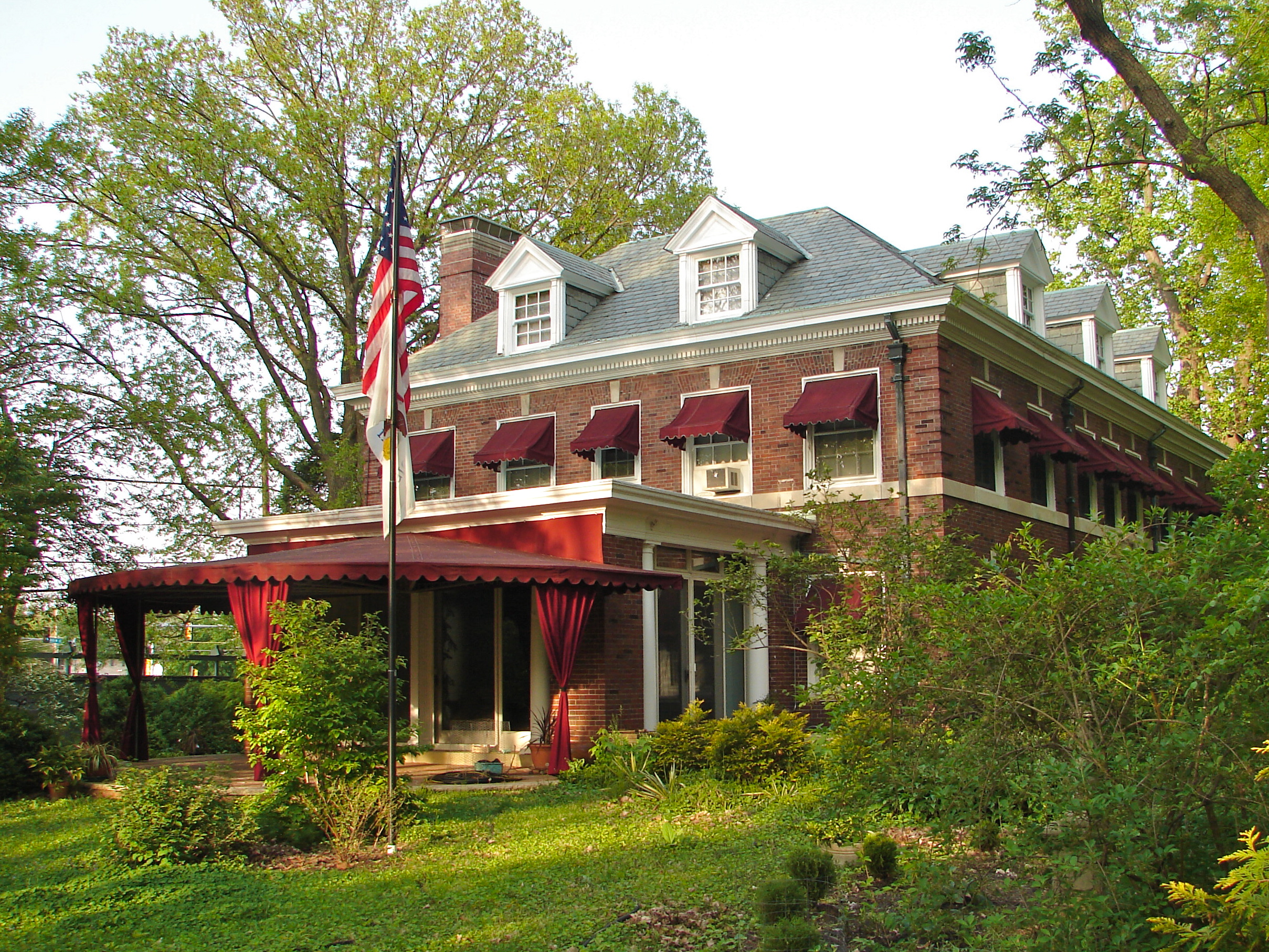

- Location within Illinois Location within the United States
- Location: 900 W. Park Ave., Champaign, Illinois
- Coordinates: 40°7′3″N 88°15′30″W
- Built: 1926
- Architect: George Ramey
- Architectural style: Georgian Revival
- NRHP reference No.: 10000993
- Added to NRHP: December 7, 2010

The George and Elsie Mattis House is a historic house located at 900 West Park Avenue in Champaign. The house was built in 1926; while it was constructed around the frame of a Queen Anne house from 1893, its redesign was so extensive that the 1926 house is effectively a new building. Locally prominent architect George Ramey designed the house in the Georgian Revival style; the English Brothers, a firm known for its commercial and public works throughout the state, built the house. The two-story brick house features quoins at the corners and a limestone belt course between the two floors. The front entrance is flanked by pilasters and topped by a full entablature with an architrave, frieze, and egg-and-dart cornice. Pedimented dormers project from the slate hip roof on all four sides.

The house was added to the National Register of Historic Places on December 7, 2010.
