= Bailey–Rugg Building =

- Formerly listed on the U.S. National Register of Historic Places
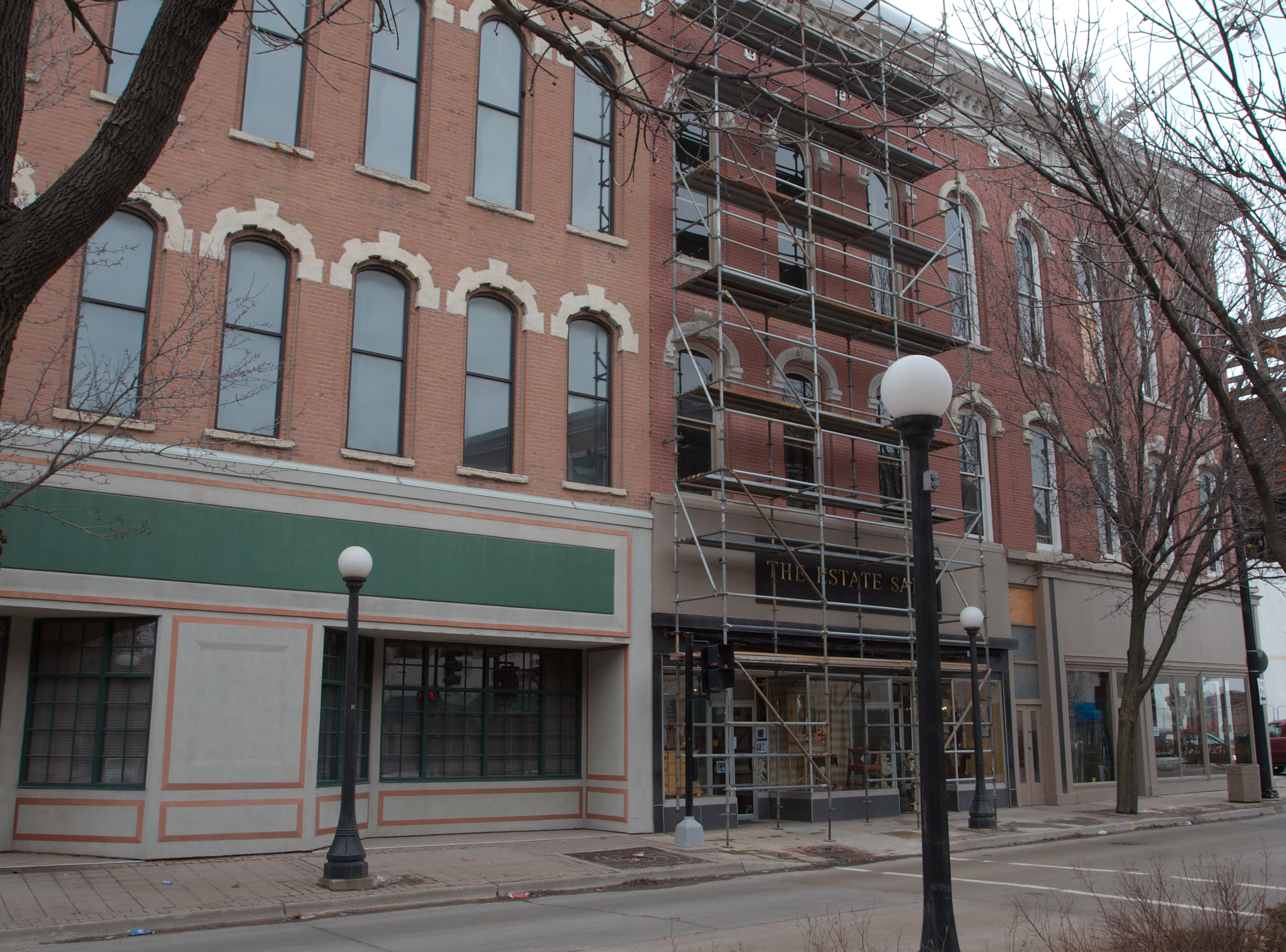
- The building in March 2008

- Location within Illinois Location within the United States
- Location: 219-225 N. Neil St., Champaign, Illinois
- Coordinates: 40°7′5″N 88°14′37″W
- Area: less than one acre
- Built: 1871
- Architectural style: Italianate
- NRHP reference No.: 97001337

Significant dates
- Added to NRHP: November 7, 1997
- Removed from NRHP: January 2, 2020

The Bailey–Rugg Building was a historic commercial building located at 219–225 North Neil Street in Champaign, Illinois.

== Description and history ==
Businessmen David Bailey and Daniel Rugg built the building as a joint venture in 1871; each merchant occupied half of the building, with a common staircase connecting the two halves. The three-story, brick building had an Italianate design. The tall, narrow windows on the second and third stories featured arched stone hoods; the arches on the front windows were divided by keystones. A metal cornice with ornamental bracketing and panels ran below the flat roof.

The building was added to the National Register of Historic Places on November 7, 1997.

In 2008, 11 years to the date after its National Register listing, the building burned down in an unexplained fire. It was removed from the National Register in 2020.
