= John Rogerson Montgomery House =

Historic house in Illinois, United States

- U.S. National Register of Historic Places
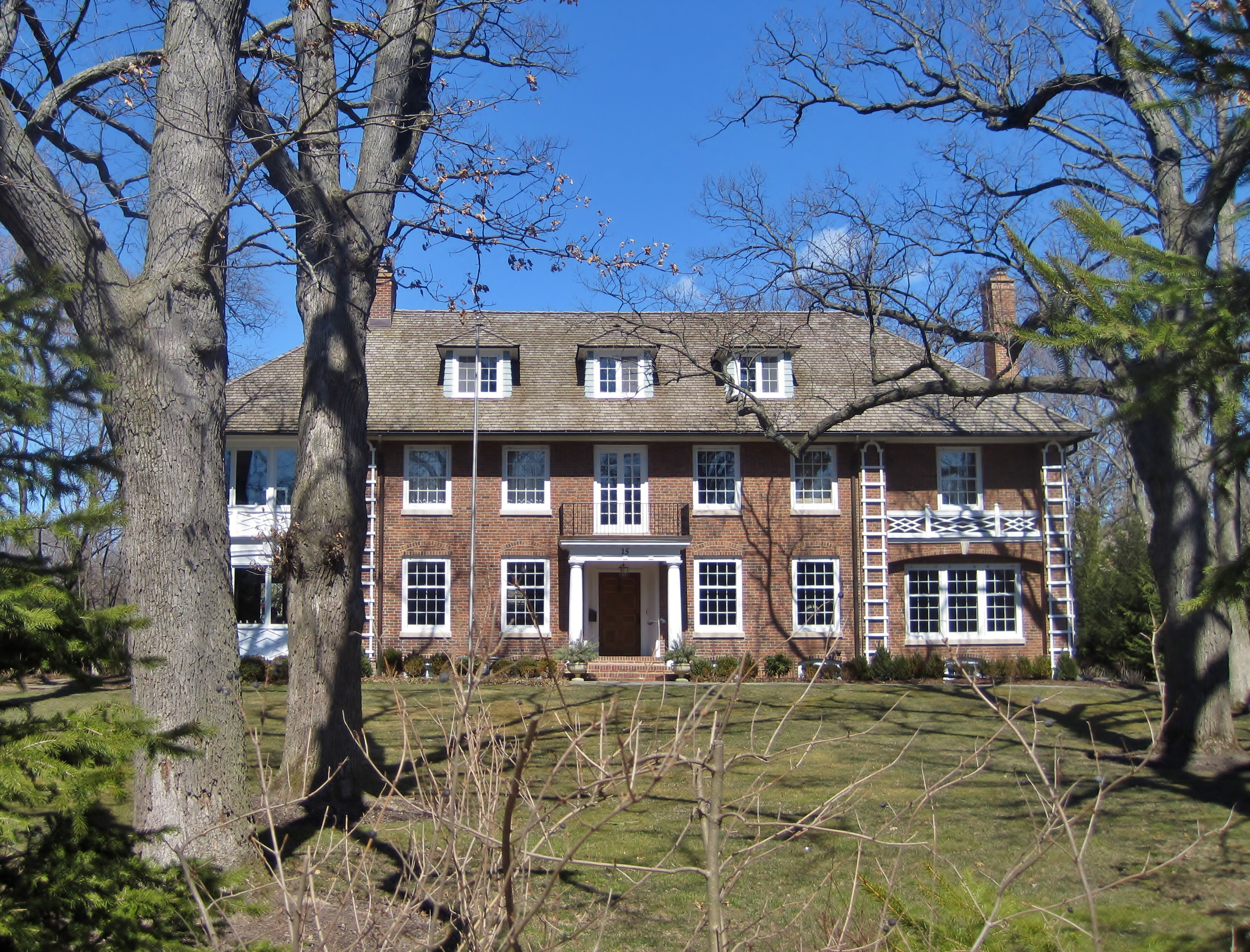

- Location within Illinois Location within the United States
- Location: 15 Old Green Bay Rd., Glencoe, Illinois
- Coordinates: 42°7′20″N 87°44′32″W
- Area: less than one acre
- Built: 1909
- Architect: Shaw, Howard Van Doren
- Architectural style: Georgian Revival, Colonial Revival, Arts & Crafts
- NRHP reference No.: 04000974
- Added to NRHP: September 15, 2004

The John Rogerson Montgomery House is a residence designed by country house architect Howard Van Doren Shaw in Glencoe, Illinois, United States. It is considered to be a significant example of Georgian Revival architecture mixed with Arts & Crafts influences.

== History ==
John Rogerson Montgomery II was born in Chicago on 8 March 1866. His father William A. Montgomery (1838–1895) was born in Lancaster, Pennsylvania, served in the 15th Wisconsin Volunteer Infantry rising to the rank of Captain and practicing law in Chicago from 1867 to 1895. His mother Was Ellen S. Smith (c. 1840 – 1866), who died nine days after his birth. He was named for his grandfather, noted Lancaster County attorney and shares a name in common with his father, grandfather, father's older brother and with his son. John graduated from Beloit College, Montgomery received a law degree in 1889; his father, grandfather and great grandfather had all been lawyers. When he was admitted to the bar he joined his father's practice. He became a successful attorney in the partnership of Montgomery, Hart, Pritchard & Herriott. Montgomery served as president of the Chicago Bar Association in 1920 and the Illinois Bar Association in 1925. He was a charter member of the American Law Institute when it was founded in 1923. He also served on the board of the Chicago Theological Seminary and was a member of the Union League Club of Chicago & University Club of Chicago. Montgomery chose architect Howard Van Doren Shaw for his estate in 1909 because Shaw had emerged as the premier architect in the Chicago area for stately country houses. Over the span of his career, Shaw would design sixty-four such estates. In 1929, the Montgomery family commissioned Granger & Bollenbacher to design a matching garage for the property.

== Architecture ==
The John Rogerson Montgomery House was built in Glencoe, Illinois. The 2 1/2-story building is predominantly Georgian Revival in nature, although there are significant influences from other movements. It is L-shaped, extending the smaller branch of the "L" to the northeast. The main facade faces the south. The main section is 30 by 75 feet (9.1 m × 22.9 m) across the main facade plus a 22-by-23-foot (6.7 m × 7.0 m) extension in the northeast. The roof was replaced with historically congruent wood shakes, and the gutters are copper. Two recent additions have been constructed in the rear of the house.

The building is largely constructed with red bricks varying in hue. There are three rectangular chimneys: one on the west wall of the "L", one on the east wall of the house, and one on the west end of the main section, emerging through the roof. Windows very in size and shape, utilizing 8/12, 6/9, 8/8, and 6/6 patterns. Dormers on the south and east sides each have two casements with six lights. The main (south) facade has seven bays; the main entrance is in the third from the west. The entrance includes a porch with two cylindrical columns atop a rectangular landing. The columns have Doric order capitals and the landing is brick. The columns support a small platform.
