= Warm Air Research House =

Historic house in Illinois, United States

- U.S. National Register of Historic Places
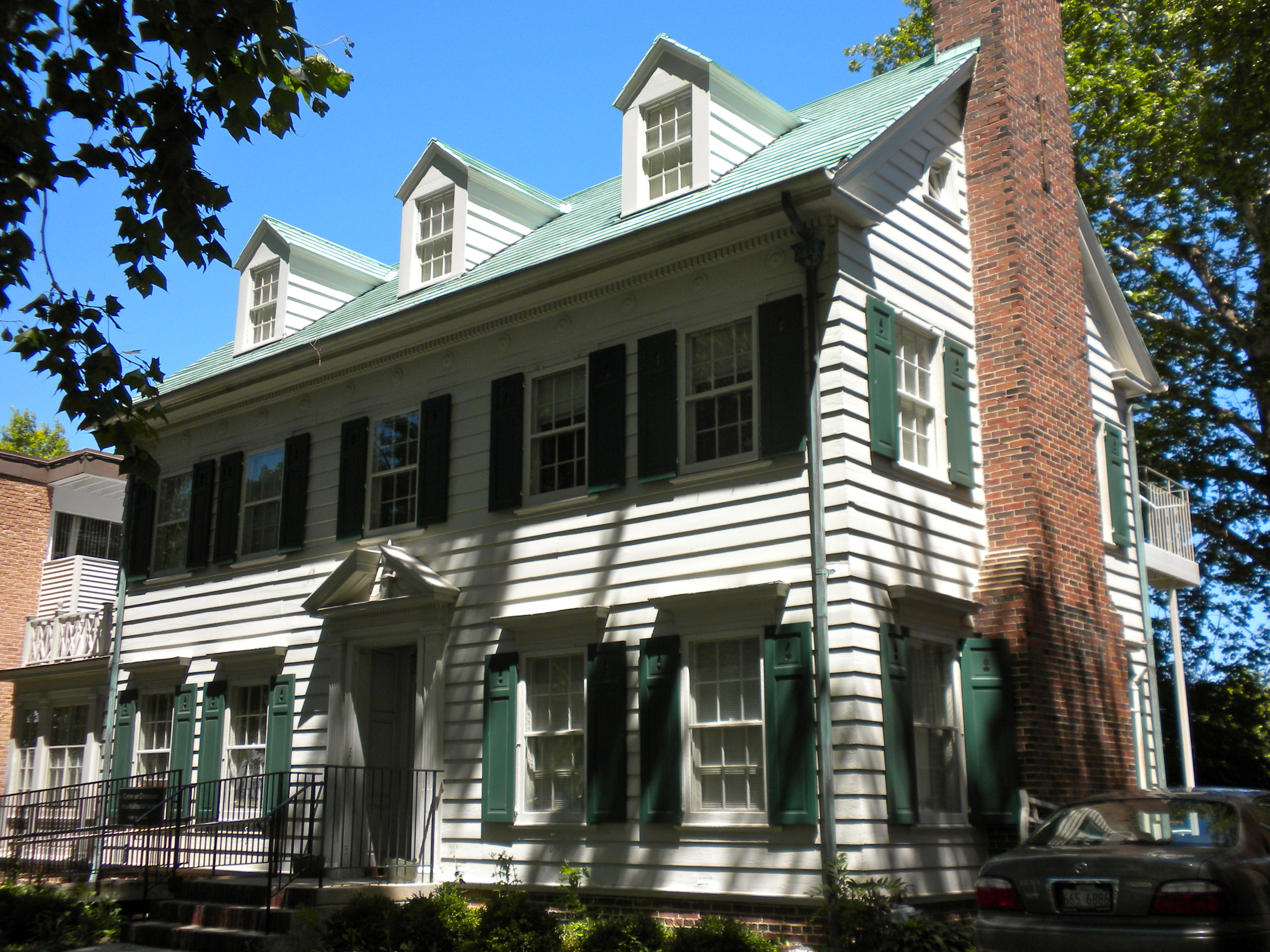

- Location within Illinois Location within the United States
- Location: 1108 W. Stoughton St., Urbana, Illinois
- Coordinates: 40°6′48″N 88°13′23″W
- Area: less than one acre
- Built: 1924
- Architect: Loring Harvey Provine, Clarence Andrew Kissinger
- Architectural style: Colonial Revival
- NRHP reference No.: 01000595
- Added to NRHP: June 12, 2001

The Warm Air Research House is a historic house and research facility located at 1108 W. Stoughton St. in Urbana, Illinois. Built in 1924, the house served as a warm-air heating research facility administered jointly by the National Warm-Air Heating and Ventilating Association and the University of Illinois Department of Mechanical Engineering. Prior to the 1920s, the American heating industry had few formal testing procedures for their products, and home heating through warm-air ventilation ducts was still considered a novel concept. The National Warm-Air Heating and Ventilating Association began to test heating methods and systems in the Department of Mechanical Engineering's laboratories, but it eventually needed a model house in which to test its domestic heating systems. The two organizations commissioned the large Colonial Revival residence, which was designed by architect Loring Harvey Provine and graduate student Clarence Andrew Kissinger. Beginning in 1932, research on air conditioning and cooling systems was also conducted in the house. Following World War II, the facility became less useful due to the shrinking size of new American homes, and the university sold the house in 1946. Some of the technologies developed in the house include storm windows, forced-air heating, and heating duct size and positioning.

The house was added to the National Register of Historic Places on June 12, 2001.
