= Greek Revival Cottage (Cambridge, Massachusetts) =

Historic house in Massachusetts, United States

- U.S. National Register of Historic Places
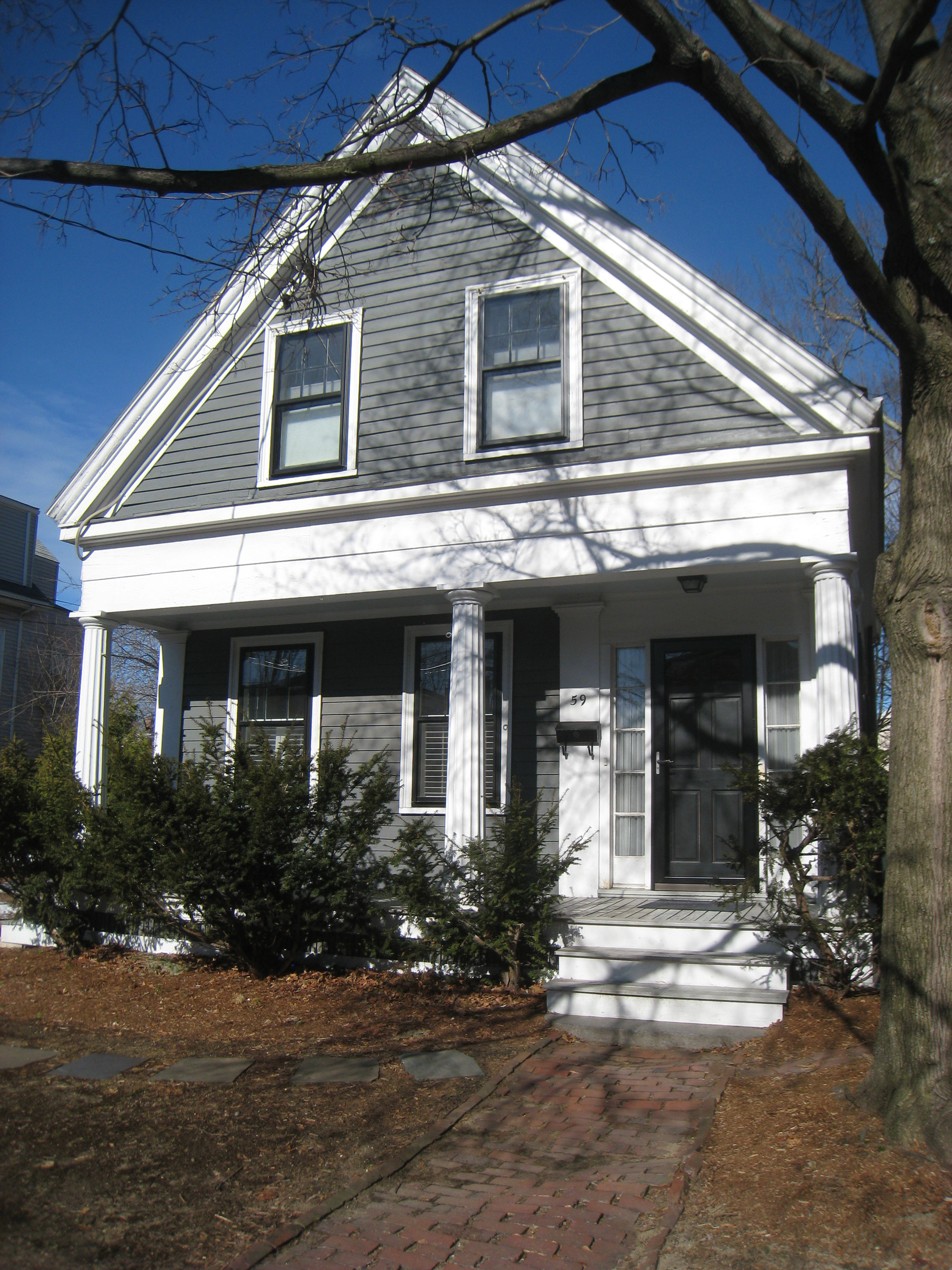

- Location within Massachusetts Location within the United States
- Location: Cambridge, Massachusetts
- Coordinates: 42°23′39.8″N 71°7′47.4″W
- Built: 1847
- Architect: Samuel Wright
- Architectural style: Greek Revival
- MPS: Cambridge MRA
- NRHP reference No.: 82001943
- Added to NRHP: April 13, 1982

The Samuel J. Wright House, also known as the Greek Revival Cottage, is an historic house at 59 Rice Street in Cambridge, Massachusetts. This modest 1.5-story Greek Revival cottage is one of the finest of its type in northwestern Cambridge. It was built in 1847 by housewright Samuel J. Wright. It features a fully pedimented gable end, original pedimented gable dormers on the left side, and fluted columns supporting an entablature. The side-hall front door is flanked by full-length sidelight windows and pilasters.

The house was listed on the National Register of Historic Places in 1982.

== See also ==
- National Register of Historic Places listings in Cambridge, Massachusetts
