= Alpha Gamma Delta Fraternity House =

- U.S. National Register of Historic Places
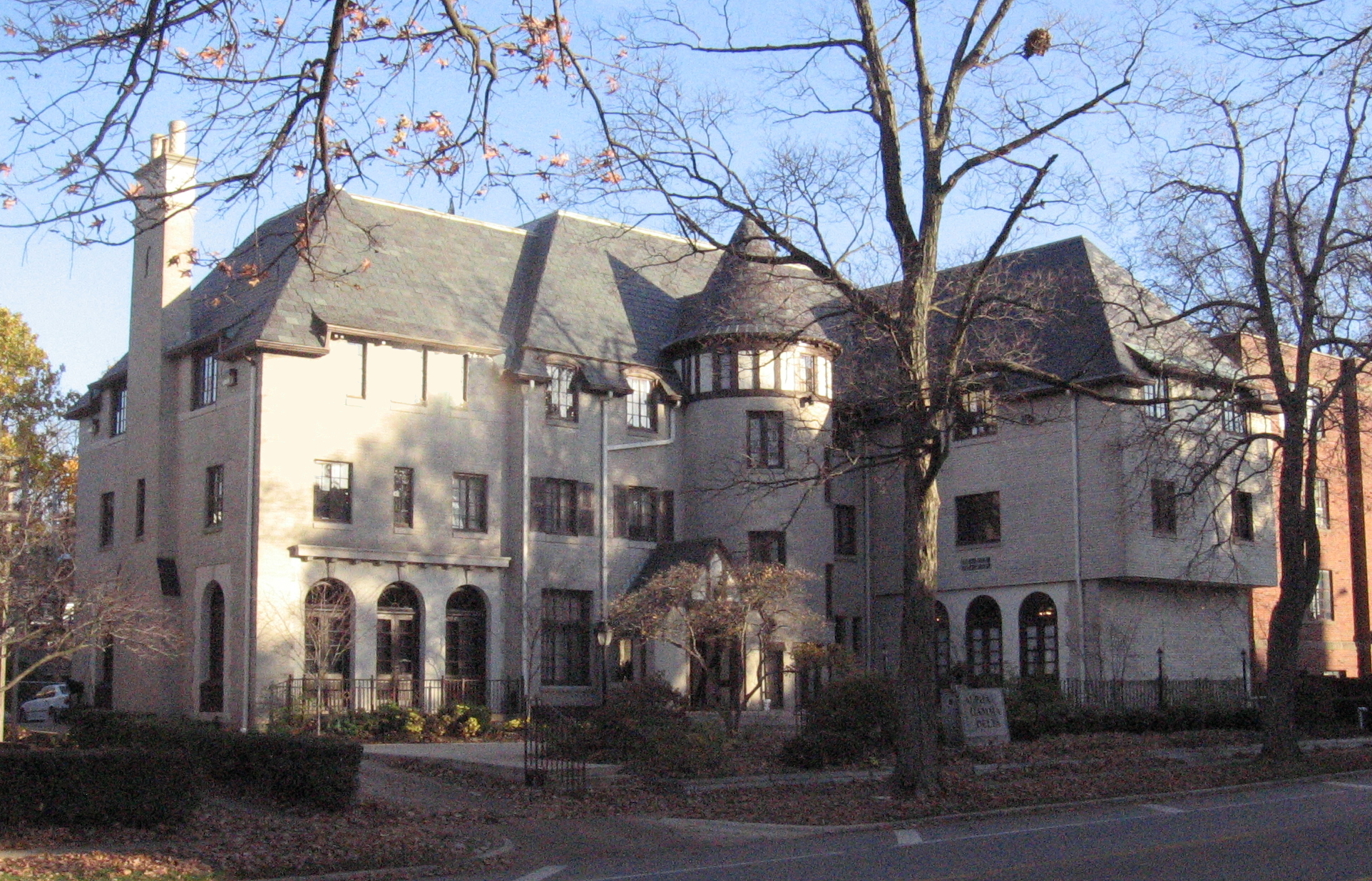

- Location within Illinois Location within the United States
- Location: 1106 S. Lincoln Avenue, Urbana, Illinois, US
- Coordinates: 40°6′13″N 88°13′9″W
- Area: less than one acre
- Built: 1927-28
- Architect: George Ramey
- Architectural style: French Eclectic
- MPS: Fraternity and Sorority Houses at the Urbana--Champaign Campus of the University of Illinois MPS
- NRHP reference No.: 09000589
- Added to NRHP: August 5, 2009

The Alpha Gamma Delta Fraternity House is a historic fraternity house located at the University of Illinois at Urbana–Champaign in Urbana, Illinois. The house was added to the National Register of Historic Places on August 5, 2009.

== History ==
The house was built in 1927-28 for the Sigma chapter of the Alpha Gamma Delta sorority, which was established in 1917 and chartered the following year. By the 1930s, the chapter was known for its academic success, and six of its members had been invited to Phi Beta Kappa; its members were also active in campus groups and university athletics.

The house was added to the National Register of Historic Places on August 5, 2009.

== Architecture ==
Architect George Ramey designed the sorority's house in the French Eclectic style, which became popular in the United States after World War I. Significant elements of the design include its gray brick exterior, its steep slate hipped roof, its central staircase tower with a conical roof, and its stone quoins.

== See also ==
- North American fraternity and sorority housing
