= A. G. Becker Property =

Historic house in Illinois, United States

- U.S. National Register of Historic Places
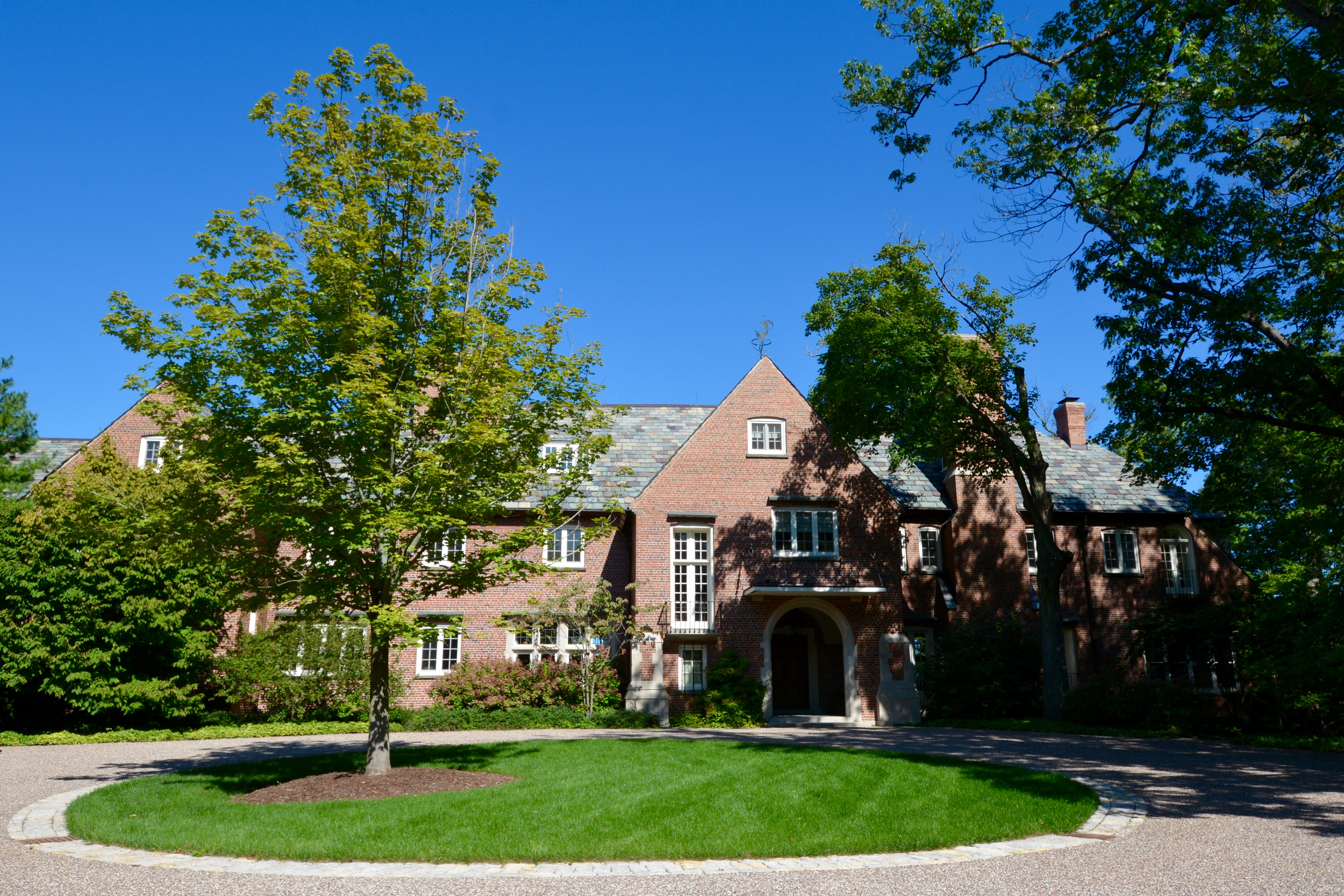

- Location within Chicago metropolitan area Location within Illinois Location within the United States
- Location: 405 Sheridan Rd., Highland Park, Illinois
- Coordinates: 42°09′41″N 87°46′05″W
- Area: 17 acres (6.9 ha)
- Built: 1921
- Architect: Howard Van Doren Shaw; Jens Jensen
- Architectural style: Tudor Revival
- NRHP reference No.: 84000343
- Added to NRHP: November 15, 1984

The A. G. Becker Property is a historic estate at 405 Sheridan Road in Highland Park, Illinois. The estate was built in 1921 for businessman A. G. Becker. Architect Howard Van Doren Shaw designed the estate's brick Tudor Revival house, which has been modified significantly since its construction. Landscape architect Jens Jensen designed the estate's grounds, which include typical elements of Jensen's such as native plants and decorative rockwork. The grounds also include one of the few surviving Jensen-designed meadows, a once-common feature of his work that was often lost to land divisions and development.

The estate was added to the National Register of Historic Places on November 15, 1984.

It remains privately owned as of 2025.
