= Metal Shop (Urbana, Illinois) =

- U.S. National Register of Historic Places
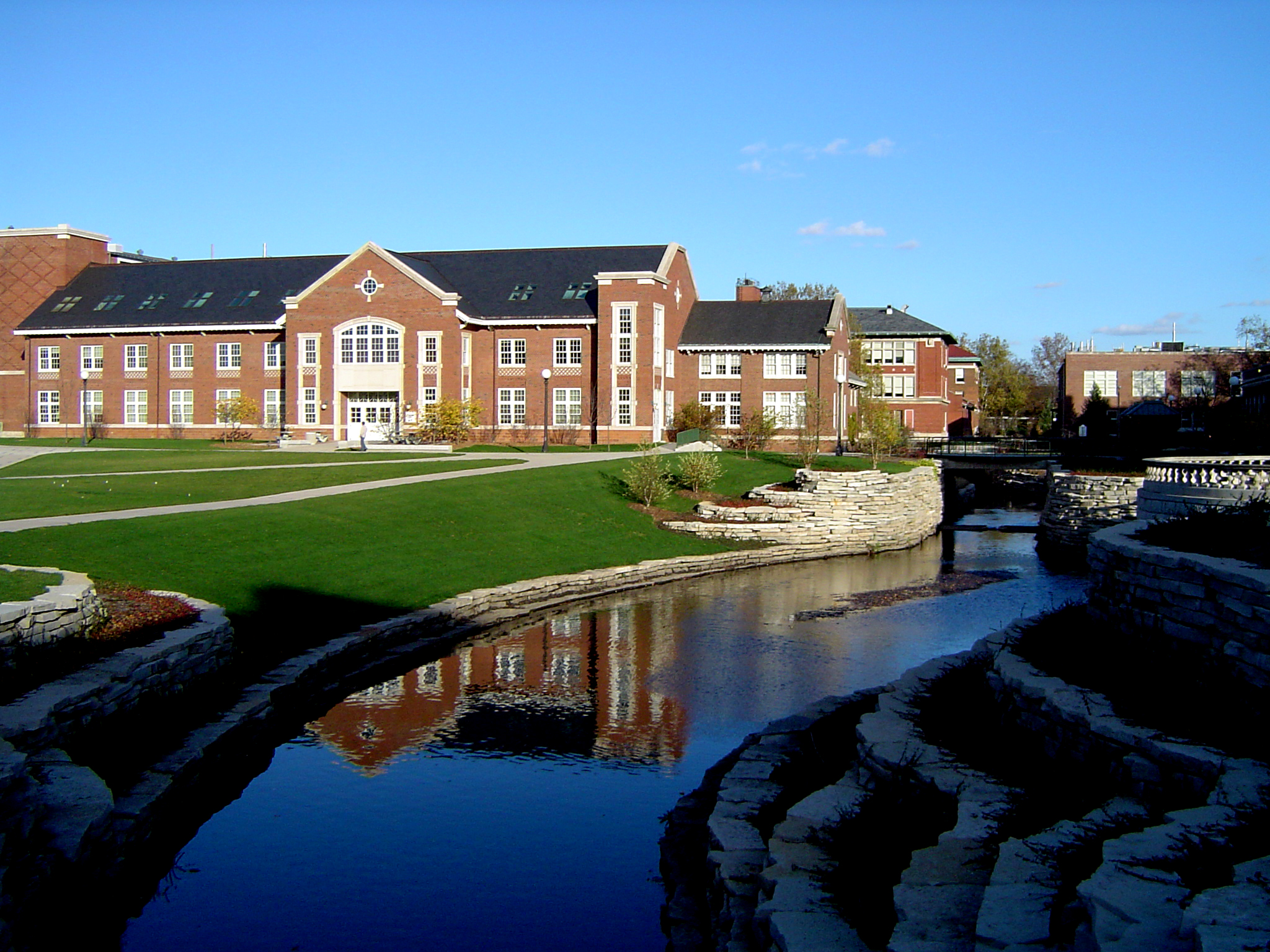
- Site of the building

- Location within Illinois Location within the United States
- Location: 102 S. Burrill Ave., Urbana, Illinois
- Coordinates: 40°6′43″N 88°13′37″W
- Area: less than one acre
- Built: 1895
- Architect: Ricker, Nathan Clifford
- MPS: University of Illinois Buildings by Nathan Clifford Ricker TR
- NRHP reference No.: 86003141
- Added to NRHP: November 19, 1986

The Metal Shop, also known as Aeronautical Lab B, was a historic building located at 1022 South Burrill Avenue on the campus of the University of Illinois at Urbana–Champaign. Built in 1895, the building served as a metal shop for the university's architecture and engineering students. Nathan Clifford Ricker, who later served as Dean of the College of Engineering, designed the building. The design was more functional than Ricker's other work on the campus; its only decorative element is a brick arched loggia in front of the entrance.

The building was added to the National Register of Historic Places on November 9, 1986. It was demolished in 1993 but is still listed on the National Register.
