= Inman Hotel =

- U.S. National Register of Historic Places
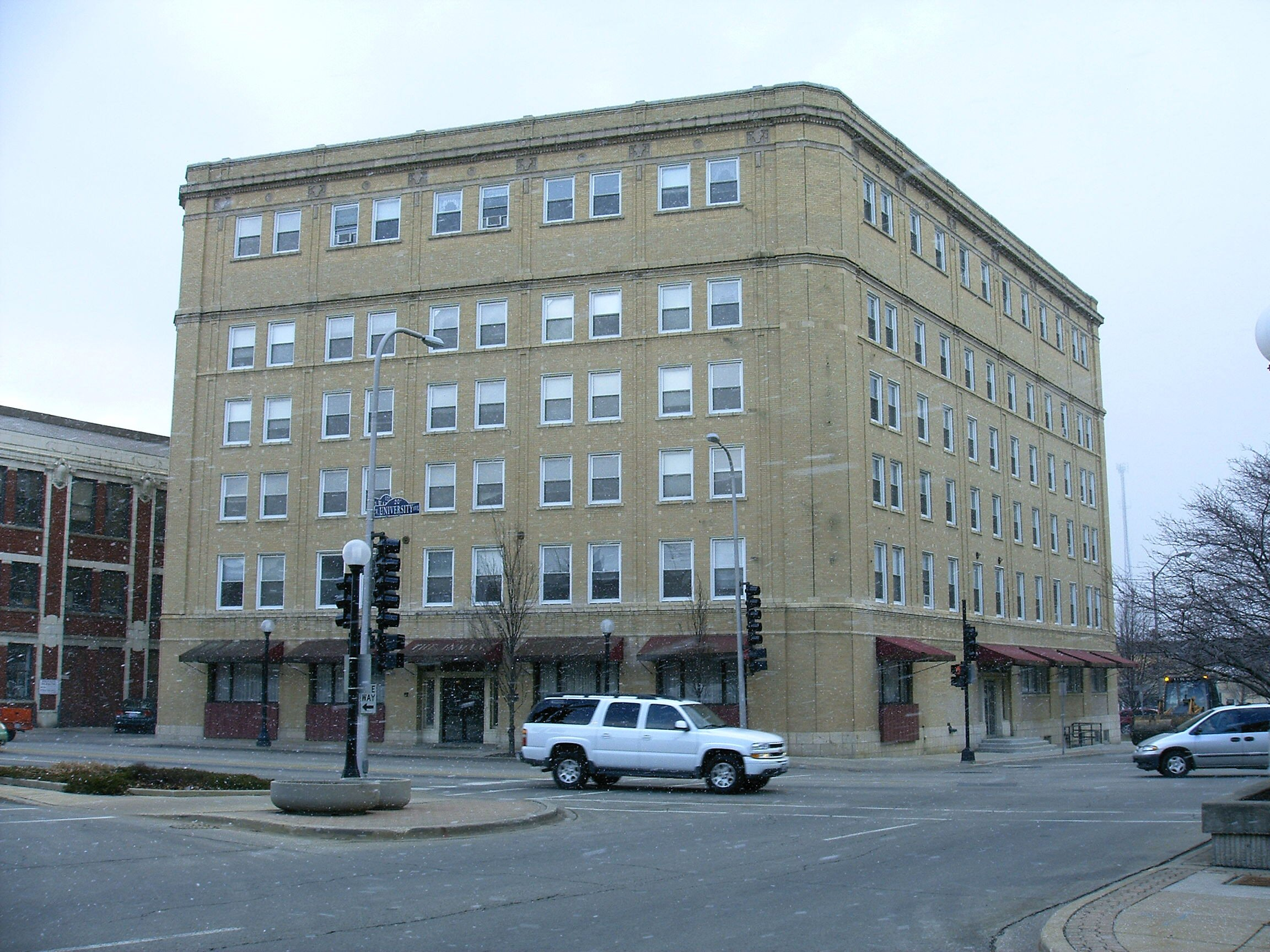

- Location within Illinois Location within the United States
- Location: 17 E. University Ave., Champaign, Illinois
- Coordinates: 40°6′58″N 88°14′33″W
- Area: less than one acre
- Built: 1915
- Architect: Spencer & Temple
- Architectural style: Classical Revival
- NRHP reference No.: 89001732
- Added to NRHP: October 20, 1989

The 1915 Inman Hotel is a former hotel building in Champaign, Illinois, United States. It is located at the southeast corner of University Avenue and Walnut Street, a major intersection in the downtown area of Champaign. It is listed on the National Register of Historic Places. The Inman Hotel was listed on the Register in 1989.

== Architecture ==
The building is six stories tall and of Classical Revival style architecture in glazed yellow brick with beige terra cotta trim. Initially constructed with only five stories, a sixth floor was added only a few years later.

Due to the shape of the lot on which it is situated, the east wall of the building is 32 feet longer than the west wall, resulting in the northeast and northwest corners not meeting at right angles. The building is 80 feet wide, and the shorter west wall is 100 feet long.
