= Alpha Delta Pi Sorority House (Urbana, Illinois) =

- U.S. National Register of Historic Places
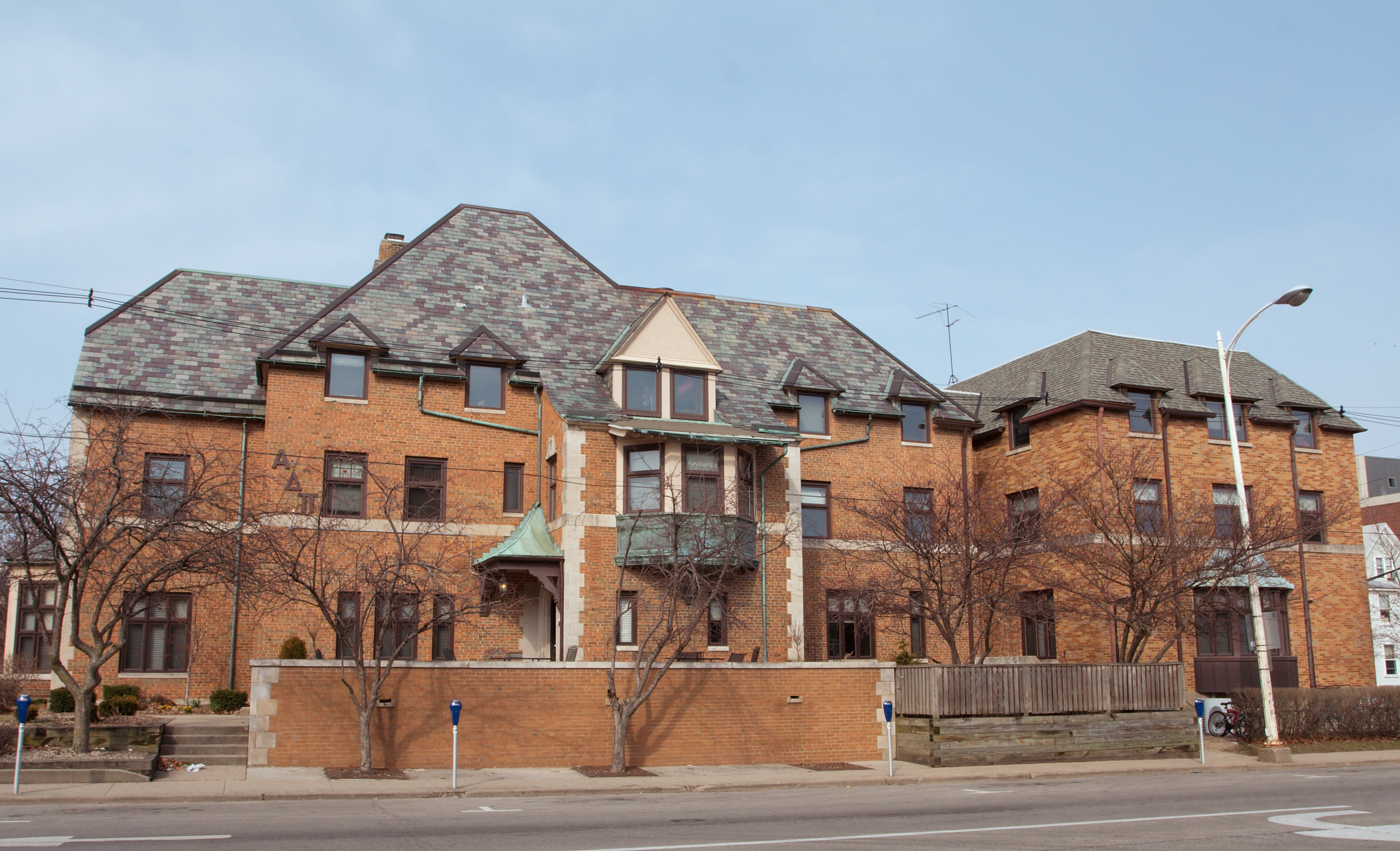

- Location within Illinois Location within the United States
- Location: 1202 West Nevada Street, Urbana, Illinois
- Coordinates: 40°6′22″N 88°13′27″W
- Area: less than one acre
- Built: 1926
- Built by: Todd, Dee
- Architect: William H. Clare and Alban E. Coen
- Architectural style: French Eclectic
- MPS: Fraternity and Sorority Houses at the Urbana--Champaign Campus of the University of Illinois MPS
- NRHP reference No.: 00001333
- Added to NRHP: November 8, 2000

The Alpha Delta Pi Sorority House is a historic sorority house located at the University of Illinois at Urbana–Champaign in Urbana, Illinois. The house was built in 1928 in French Eclectic style. The house was added to the National Register of Historic Places in 2000.

== History ==
Alpha Delta Pi collegiate social sorority was established at Wesleyan College in Macon, Georgia in 1851. The sorority absorbed the local sorority Alpha Alpha at the University of Illinois, resulting in the Sigma chapter. Sigma chapter of Alpha Delta Pi was chartered on March 28, 1912.

Sigma chapter was originally housed at 705 South Third Street in Champaign, Illinois. It moved to 1106 West Oregon in Urbana, Illinois in 1915. In 1920, the chapter purchased a lot on the corner of Nevada and Goodwin Streets in Urbana to build a new chapter house. The Sigma of Alpha Delta Pi Building Corporation was established to select an architect, pick a design, and arrange financing. Funding was addressed by selling bonds to members, raising $15,000 by April 1926, and by taking a $30,000 loan from a bank.

Sigma chapter built Alpha Delta Phi Sorority House at 1202 West Nevada Street in 1926. The chapter house helped address the housing shortage at the university, which only had one women's dormitory at the time. This shortage led, in part, to the addition of 27 fraternity and sorority chapter houses to the campus between 1926 and 1930.

Alpha Delta Pi Sorority House was added to the National Register of Historic Places on November 8, 2000.

== Architecture ==
The William H. Clare and Alban E. Coen of the Berwyn, Illinois architecture firm Clare-Alben W. Coen Company designed the Alpha Delta Pi Sorority House in the French Eclectic style. The style became popular in the 1920s thanks to returning soldiers from World War I and several studies of French cottages. However, it was atypical at the University of Illinois, setting it apart stylistically from the chapter houses of other fraternities and sororities. The house was constructed by general contractor Dee Thomas of Urbana.

Key features of the two-story brick sorority house include its asymmetrical massing, steep slate hip roof with multiple dormers, limestone quoins and string course, bay windows, and arched corner entryway. A two-and-one-half-story addition was added in 1953.

== See also ==
- North American fraternity and sorority housing
