= Frederick Squires House =

Historic house in Illinois, United States

- U.S. National Register of Historic Places
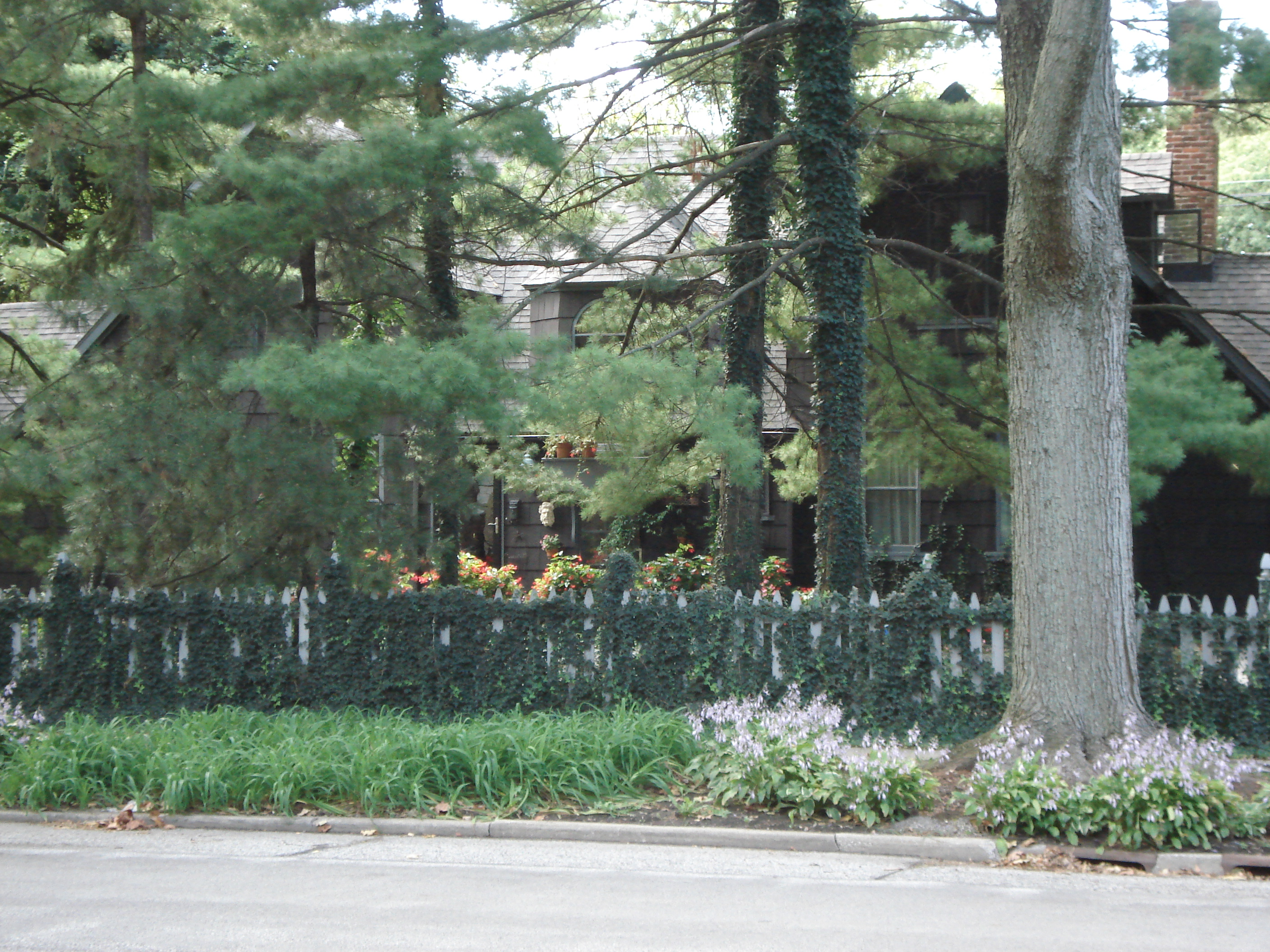

- Location within Illinois Location within the United States
- Location: 1003 W. Church St., Champaign, Illinois
- Coordinates: 40°7′5″N 88°15′38″W
- Built: c. 1870s, 1927
- Architect: Frederick Squires
- Architectural style: Craftsman
- NRHP reference No.: 11000846
- Added to NRHP: November 22, 2011

The Frederick Squires House is a historic house located at 1003 West Church Street in Champaign, Illinois. Owner and architect Frederick Squires created the Craftsman style house in 1927. Squires combined two similar 1870s frame houses, one of which was moved from another site in Champaign, to build his house. In addition to using existing houses to form a new one, Squires used recycled wood, brick, and concrete to complete his new home. The house's interior design incorporates principles of Craftsman design such as an open floor plan, use of natural materials throughout, and an entrance hall that functions as a room in its own right.

Born in 1879 in Plainfield, New Jersey, Frederick Squires graduated from Williams College with a BA in Architecture and then attended the School of Mines of Columbia University, the earliest mining and metallurgy school in the United States, established in 1864. Squires then worked as an architect until 1914. He was active in designing office buildings in New York City as well as in publishing designs in outlets such as Architectural Record, Concrete-Cement Age, and House and Garden. He published a book entitled The Hollow Tile House (1913) on a new construction technique that he had developed. One year later, he published the quirky Architectonics: The Tales of Tom Thumtack, Architect, illustrated by Rockwell Kent. From 1914 on, Squires worked with his brother in the oil business, but he maintained his interest in architecture, as demonstrated by the unique design of his Craftsman style home.

The house was added to the National Register of Historic Places on November 22, 2011.
