= Elm Street Court =

Historic house in Illinois, United States

- U.S. National Register of Historic Places
- U.S. Historic district
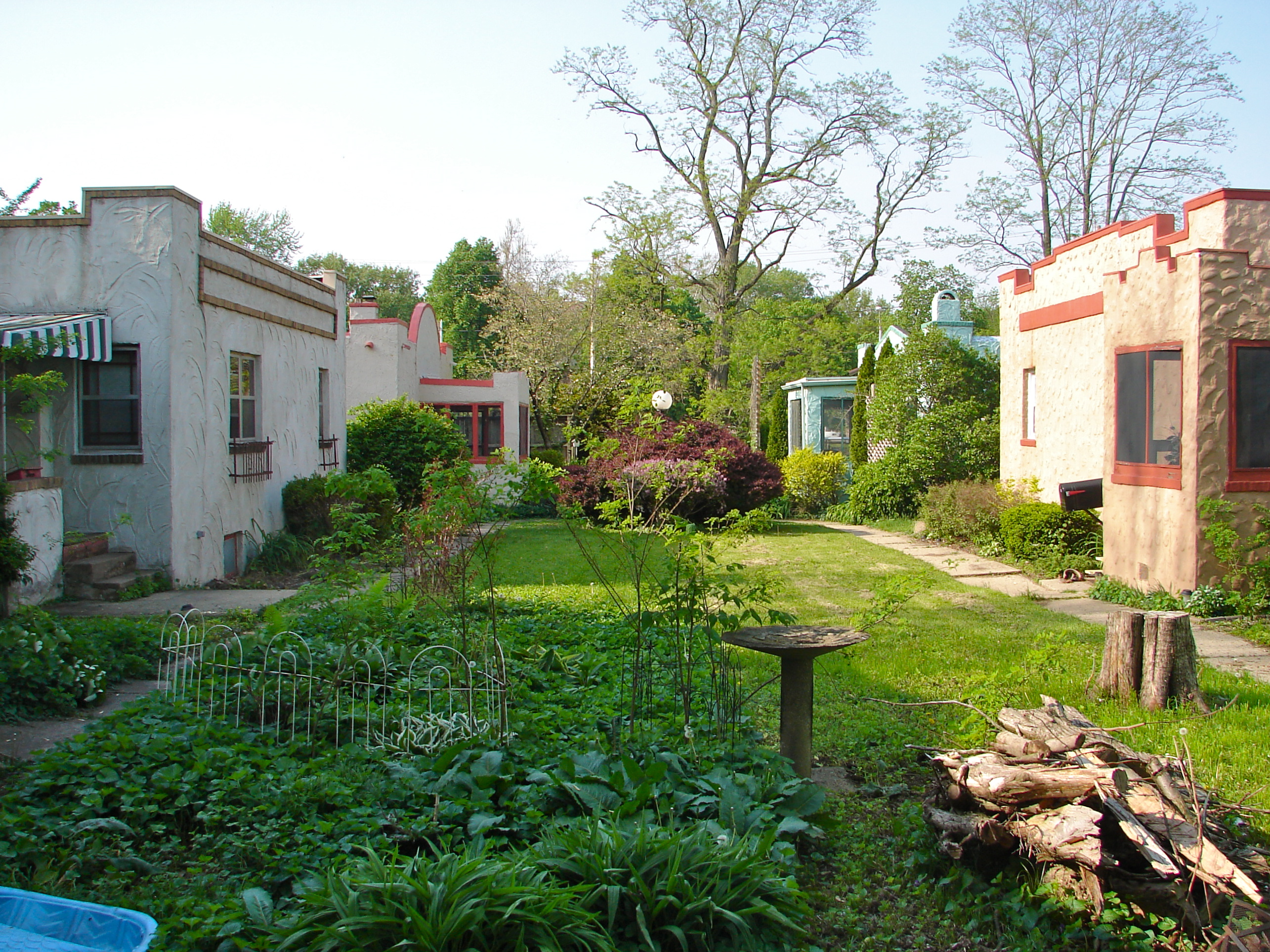

- Location within Illinois Location within the United States
- Location: 1-8 Elm Street Court, Urbana, Illinois
- Coordinates: 40°6′43″N 88°12′54″W
- Area: 1.2 acres (0.49 ha)
- Architectural style: Spanish Colonial Revival
- NRHP reference No.: 00000681
- Added to NRHP: June 15, 2000

Elm Street Court is a bungalow court located on Elm Street in Urbana, Champaign County, Illinois.

The court, built in 1926, consists of eight Spanish Colonial Revival style bungalows arranged around a central courtyard. While the houses have similar styles and floor plans, they also all have key differences, such as the shape of their parapet walls and the color and style of their stucco exteriors.

A 10-foot (3.0 m) tall concrete gate with Craftsman details marks the entrance to the courtyard, and a concrete birdbath sits in the center of the garden courtyard.

The bungalow court was a popular housing style in California and Florida during the 1920s, but the Elm Street Court is one of the few examples of the style in the Midwest.

The court was added to the National Register of Historic Places on June 15, 2000.

== See also ==
- Houses on the National Register of Historic Places in Illinois
- National Register of Historic Places listings in Champaign County, Illinois
