= George Pick House =

Historic house in Illinois, United States

- U.S. National Register of Historic Places
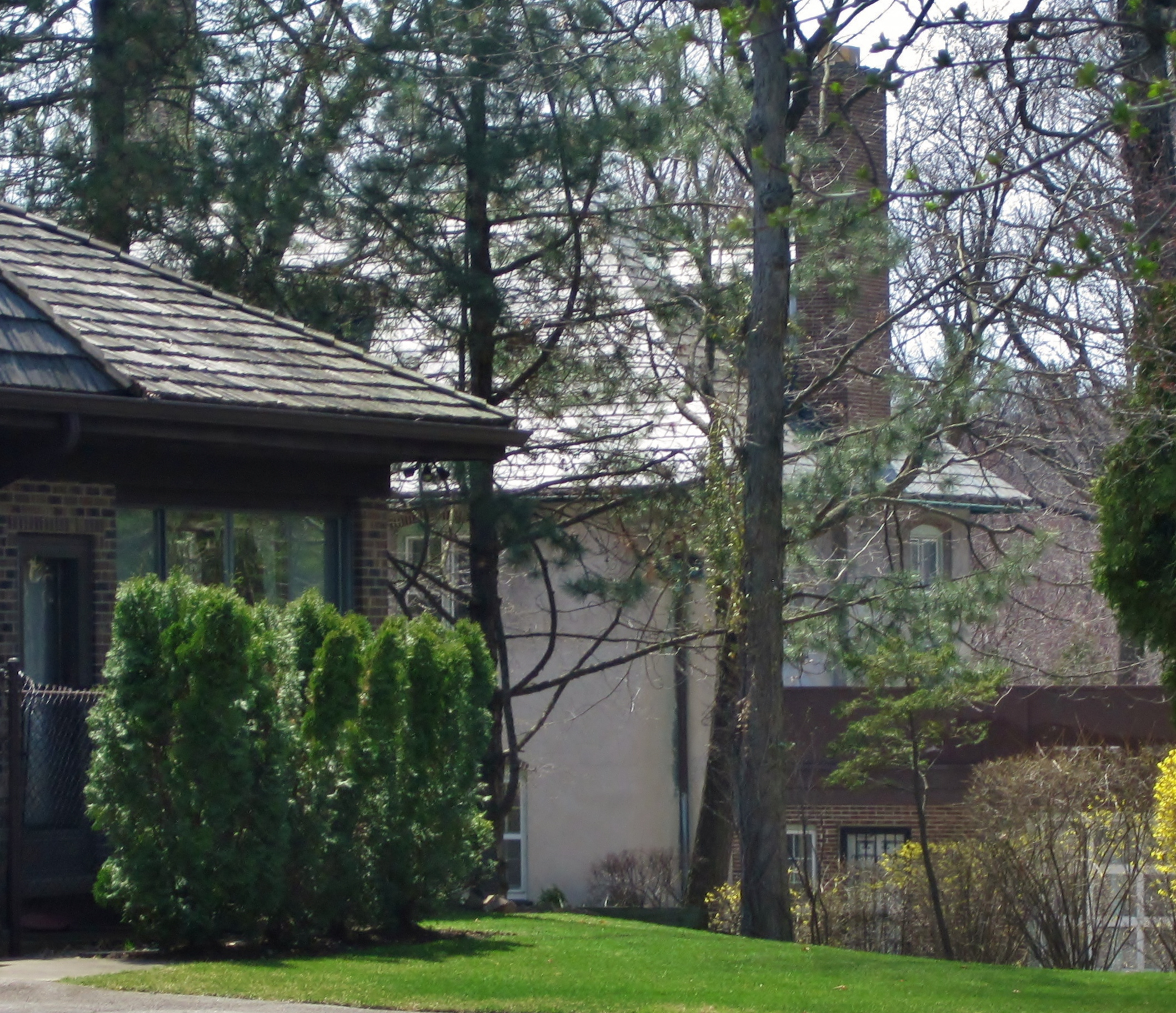

- Location within Chicago metropolitan area Location within Illinois Location within the United States
- Location: 970 Sheridan Rd., Highland Park, Illinois
- Coordinates: 42°10′10″N 87°46′24″W
- Area: 6 acres (2.4 ha)
- Architect: Howard Van Doren Shaw
- Architectural style: Eclectic Revival
- MPS: Highland Park MRA
- NRHP reference No.: 82002574
- Added to NRHP: September 29, 1982

The George Pick House is a historic house at 970 Sheridan Road in Highland Park, Illinois. The house was built in the early twentieth century for businessman George Pick. Prolific Chicago architect Howard Van Doren Shaw, who also designed several other homes in Highland Park, designed the house. Shaw gave the house an Eclectic Revival design with extensive detail work inspired by architectural styles from throughout Europe. The house's features include carved limestone birds, gables with decorative bargeboards, and an arcade at the entrance.

The house was added to the National Register of Historic Places on September 29, 1982.
