= Kappa Kappa Gamma Sorority House (Urbana, Illinois) =

Historic house in Urbana, Illinois, US

- U.S. National Register of Historic Places
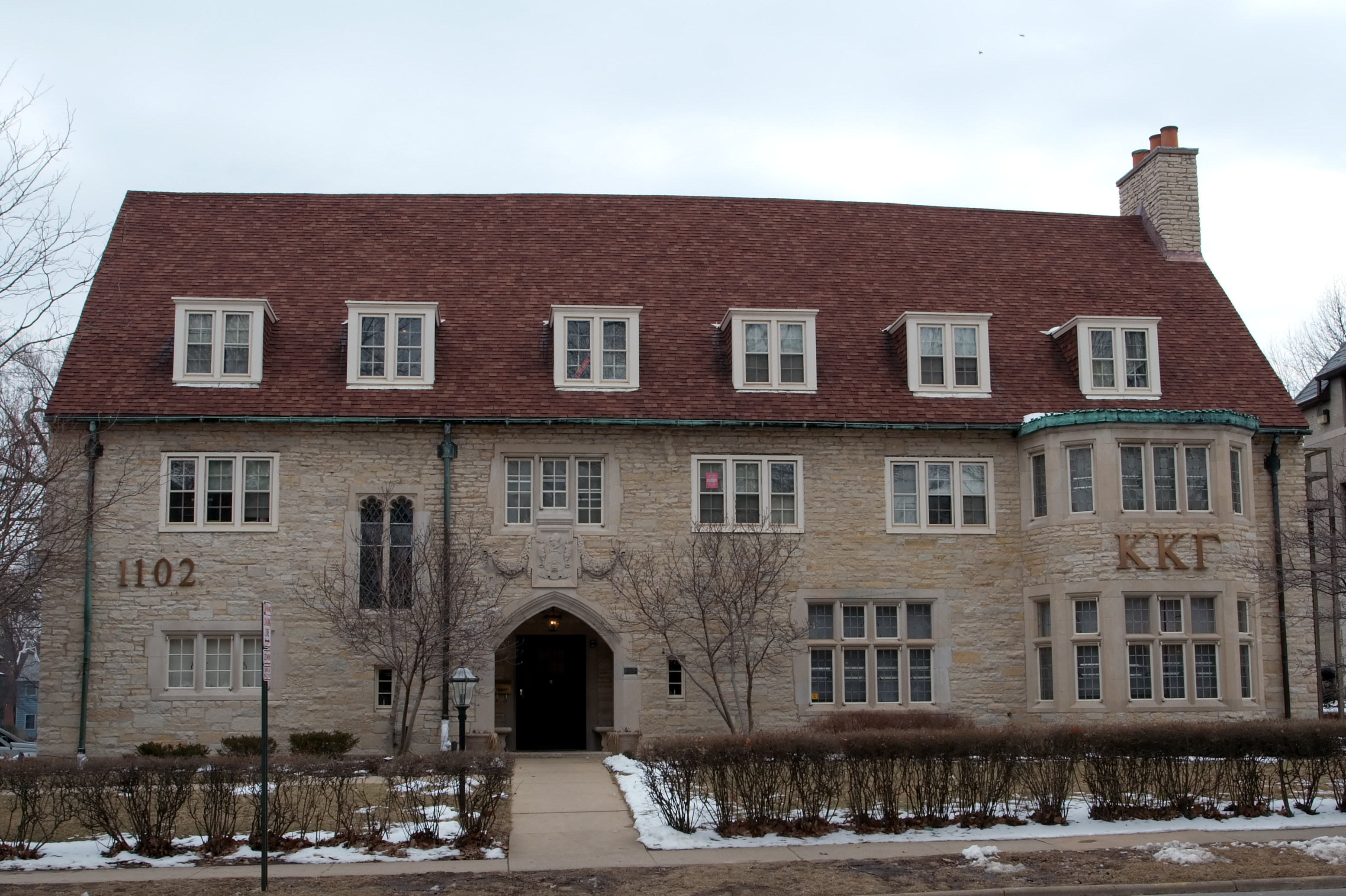

- Location within Illinois Location within the United States
- Location: 1102 S. Lincoln Ave., Urbana, Illinois
- Coordinates: 40°6′12″N 88°13′9″W
- Area: less than one acre
- Built: 1928
- Built by: Stoolman, A.W.
- Architect: Milman, Ralph E.
- Architectural style: English Revival
- MPS: Fraternity and Sorority Houses at the Urbana--Champaign Campus of the University of Illinois MPS
- NRHP reference No.: 04000074
- Added to NRHP: February 25, 2004

The Kappa Kappa Gamma Sorority House is a historic sorority house at the University of Illinois at Urbana–Champaign in Urbana, Illinois. The house was built in 1928 in the English Revival style. It was added to the National Register of Historic Places in 2004.

== History ==
Kappa Kappa Gamma women's fraternity was established at Monmouth University in 1870. Its Beta Lambda chapter was chartered at the University of Illinois at Urbana–Champaign on April 28, 1899. The chapter purchased its first house at 903 West California Street in Urbana, Illinois in 1900.

As the chapter grew, it moved several times. Beta Lambda built a new chapter house at 1102 South Lincoln Avenue in Urbana in 1928. In 1928, there was a shortage of housing for female students at the University of Illinois, which only had one dorm for female students. Sorority chapter houses helped solve the problem and helped the university become one of the main centers for fraternities and sororities in the United States Beta Lambda chapter has continuously occupied the Kappa Kappa Gamma Sorority House since its construction.

The house was added to the National Register of Historic Places on February 25, 2004.

== Architecture ==
Kappa Kappa Gamma Sorority House was designed by Ralph E. Milman, a Chicago architect with Howard Shaw Associates. He was the husband Helen Brown Milman, a Kappa Kappa Gamma member and a landscape architect. The house was built by A.W. Stoolman, a local contractor who also built the Henry Administration Building for the University of Illinois.

Kappa Kappa Gamma is designed in the English Revival style. This was a popular architectural style in the United States in the early 20th century. Key features of the house's design include a steep gable roof with projecting dormers, a rough ashlar limestone exterior, a projecting bay window with leaded glass windows, and a recessed arched entryway.

The house has undergone several additions and renovations.

== See also ==
- North American fraternity and sorority housing
