= Greek Revival Cottage (Urbana, Illinois) =

Historic house in Illinois, United States

- U.S. National Register of Historic Places
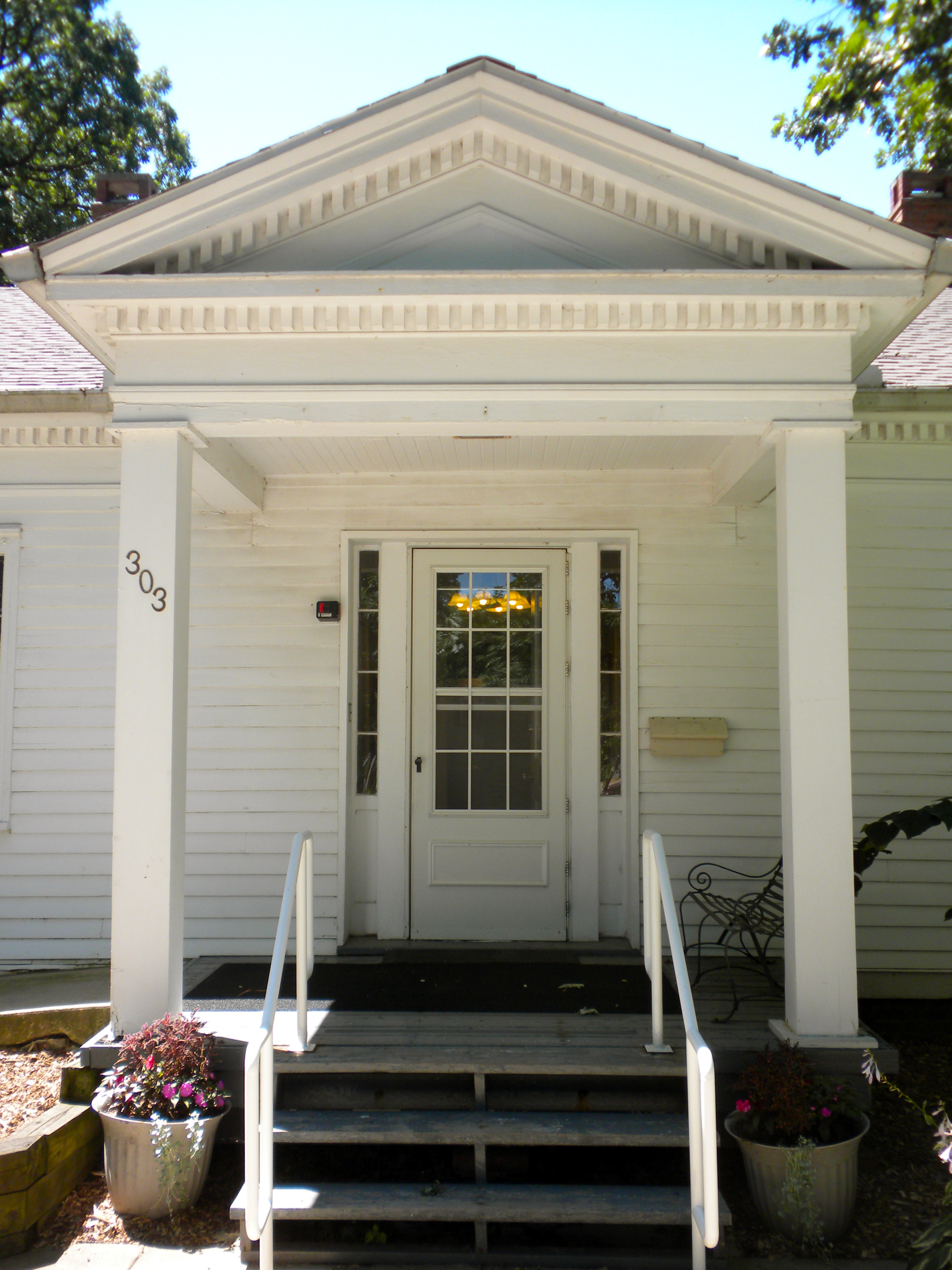

- Location within Illinois Location within the United States
- Location: 300 W. University Ave., Urbana, Illinois
- Coordinates: 40°6′57″N 88°12′37″W
- Area: 2 acres (0.81 ha)
- Built: 1860
- Architectural style: Greek Revival
- NRHP reference No.: 77000473
- Added to NRHP: October 20, 1977

The Greek Revival Cottage is a historic house located in Leal Park in Urbana, Illinois. Built circa 1860, the house is the last remaining Greek Revival home in Champaign-Urbana. As Champaign County was settled in the 1850s, the same time the Greek Revival style's popularity declined, few houses in the county were built in the style. The house's front entrance features a portico, the house's main Greek Revival element, with a dentillated pediment supported by square pillars. While the house was originally located at 1205 W. Springfield, it was relocated to the park in the 1970s to save it from demolition.

The house was added to the National Register of Historic Places on October 20, 1977.
