= Ladies' Art Association =

Organization in New York City

The Ladies' Art Association was established in New York City in 1867, during a time when women's arts organizations were becoming prominent in both Europe and the United States. The LAA was the most successful women's art association to appear during this era. Its goal was the "promotion of the interests of Women Artists". The organization's constitution outlined how they would achieve this goal, including discussions of professionalism, lectures and readings relating to the art world, and available studio space for a low price. The LAA, and organizations like it, served to help female artists break into the traditionally male dominated sphere of the art world and gain their own recognition and notoriety. This association offered a variety of resources to its members, including work spaces that were available to rent, professional classes, and a gallery to publish their art. Through this network of predominantly female artists, members were also provided professional connections, as well as financial and social support. Members of the Ladies' Art Association had access to artistic opportunities that were not easily available to nineteenth century women otherwise. These advantages included access to art education, the ability to show and sell their work, and the reception of valuable letters of recommendation when they traveled abroad. The Ladies' Art Association helped its members thrive in the historically male dominated art world through these opportunities, along with the support and encouragement provided by like minded female artists.

== History ==
The Ladies' Art Association originally began with two women named Mary Strongitharm Pope (Mrs. John Pope) and Susan Clark Gray (Mrs. Henry Peter Gray) between the years of 1866 and 1867. Pope and Gray started their organization by first visiting the studios of women artists and inviting them to participate in the LAA. In the early days of the association, there were nine members who met regularly at Pope's studio and discussed the issues faced by women artists, as well as ways to combat these issues. The goal of the LAA was for its members to involve themselves socially and professionally with one another, as well as to gain exposure to all matters concerning art and artists, which they did not have regular access to as women. Mrs. Pope offered her studio as an exhibition space and the members shared their artwork, both finished and unfinished, with one another, giving and receiving constructive criticism, peer review, and guidance. Mrs. Pope was an especially prominent figure within the Ladies' Art Association, holding together and encouraging the otherwise struggling female artists.

In 1868, following the death of Mary Strongitharm Pope, the LAA moved its meetings to the Women's Bureau on 49 East Twenty-Third Street, which was a residence intended for New York women to use for their intellectual, social, and professional activities. It was there that they were able to establish a permanent gallery and their first collection of women's artwork. About a year later, the LAA was able to secure an apartment in Clinton Hall, a building that was typically used for events such as auctions and lectures. This relocation allowed the Ladies Art Association to gain a headquarters where they could not only hold meetings, but also display their art, teach classes, and maintain a studio.

=== Membership ===
In order to remain inclusive, while also maintaining a degree of professionalism, the Ladies' Art Association offered different levels of membership. These different levels included the titles of fellow, junior, and associate, each having different requirements. Fellows were required to be professional artists. Juniors, who were art students, and associates, who were either amateurs or connoisseurs, were the entry forms of membership, though they were recognized as paths to professionalism. Any member of the Association was able to rent studio space, however, fellows were the only members who were allowed to vote in elections and attend monthly "stated" meetings. "Stated" meetings were intended to discuss professional matters, requiring each member to bring with them an original art piece, and were one of two kinds of formal meetings held each month by the LAA. The second type of monthly meeting was supposed to be for socializing and artistic conversation and was open to all members, for an attendance fee of one dollar. The LAA prioritized professionals as their primary constituents, but this category was defined broadly by the group's leadership.

=== Elected Officers in 1876 ===
As of 1876, Susan Clark Gray (Mrs. Henry Peters Gray), who was one of the founding members of the LAA, served as the group's president. Mrs. Sophie Mapes Tolles held the position of vice president with Miss E.C. Field as the treasurer, Miss Cornelia S. Post as the recording secretary, and Mrs. J.B. Collin as the corresponding secretary. Alice Donlevy served as the custodian and a part of the executive committee, along with Miss Mary Cook and Mrs. Richmond Phillips.

=== Art Education ===
In addition to elevating the interests of female artists, the Ladies' Art Association also offered its members a variety of educational opportunities. They held both higher level and lower-level classes, in order to accommodate a range of experiences. In 1869, the LAA organized a Life School for Women, along with classes focused on the technical skills needed for drawing and carpet design. In the late 1870s, the course list expanded even further to include classes on decorative and household arts. In 1883, the Plan of Instruction included classes on subjects such as watercolor painting, figure painting, modeling, pastel drawing, wallpaper design, pottery decoration, principles of design, and many others. This expansion into the decorative arts allowed women to have access to more opportunities for employment, as they could now be more easily employed in their own homes, rather than being forced to seek factory work.

=== Growth of the LAA ===
By 1877, the Ladies' Art Association had expanded significantly. They maintained their headquarters in New York, while also establishing branches abroad in Paris and London, as well as locally in Brooklyn. This expansion of the association allowed for an increase in membership as well. There were as many as 150 members, along with hundreds of students, yearly, spanning across the United States, Canada, and Europe by the late 1870s. Additionally, an 1890 Report on the Ladies' Art Association indicated that both black and white members were attending meetings, displaying an inclusive growth.

== Bibliography ==
Dudley, Elizabeth. "The Ladies' Art Association of New York." The Aldine 8, no. 5 (1876): 151. doi:10.2307/20637285.

Masten, April. Art Work: Women Artists and Democracy in Mid-Nineteenth Century New York. Philadelphia, PA: University of Pennsylvania Press, 2008.

Prieto, Laura. At Home in the Studio: The Professionalization of Women Artists in America. Boston, MA: Harvard University Press, 2001.

Swinth, Kirsten. Painting Professionals: Women Artists and the Development of Modern American Art 1870-1930. Chapel Hill, NC: University of North Carolina Press, 2001.
