= Psi Upsilon =

North American collegiate fraternity

- ΨΥ
- Founded: November 24, 1833; 192 years ago Union College
- Type: Social
- Affiliation: NIC
- Status: Active
- Scope: North America
- Motto: "Unto us has befallen a mighty friendship"
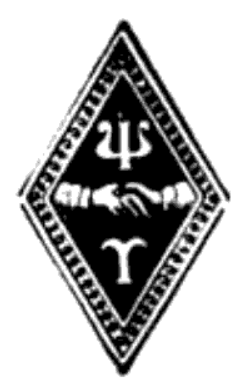
- Member badge
- Colors: Garnet and Gold
- Symbol: Diamond
- Flag
- Flower: Alstroemeria lily
- Mascot: Owl
- Publication: The Diamond of Psi Upsilon
- Chapters: 27 active
- Colonies: 1
- Nickname: Psi U
- Headquarters: 3003 East 96th Street; Indianapolis, Indiana 46240; United States
- Website: psiu.org

Psi Upsilon (ΨΥ), commonly known as Psi U, is a North American fraternity, founded at Union College on November 24, 1833. The fraternity has chartered fifty chapters at colleges and universities throughout North America, some of which are inactive.

Psi Upsilon's foundation provides scholarships and other financial guidance to students throughout the United States and Canada, giving preference to its members, as well as mentoring and other support services.

== History ==
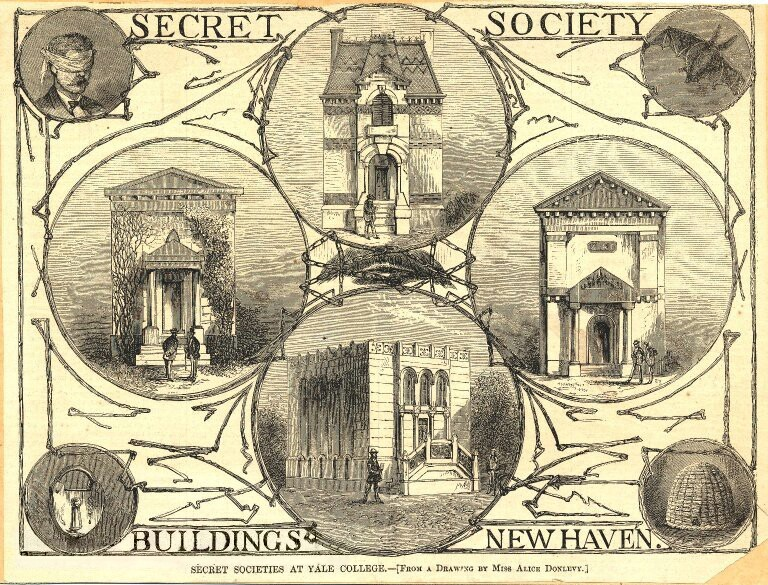
"Secret Society Buildings at Yale College", by Alice Donlevy ca. 1880. Pictured are: Psi Upsilon Left center: Skull & Bones (Russell Trust Association). Right center: Delta Kappa Epsilon. Bottom: Scroll and Key (Kingsley Trust Association)

In 1833, five sophomore and two freshman members of the Delphian Society, a local literary group, had become friends and began to meet regularly to exchange essays and engage in literary debate. The seven men thus founded Psi Upsilon on the evening of November 24, 1833. The first constitution was adopted on January 10, 1834.

The first expansion chapter was started in 1837 when a member of Psi Upsilon at Union transferred to New York University. Ten chapters were founded in the first ten years, and eight more chapters were founded in the twenty years after that. By 1904, when the last founding father, Edward Martindale, died, there were 23 chapters and more than 11,000 members.

During World War II, a few chapters, such as the Omicron, rented their houses to the Army as barracks and offices. One chapter, the Epsilon Nu, rented its house to a sorority (Gamma Phi Beta). The rental income these chapters received allowed them to survive. Other chapters, such as the Lambda and Eta, could not afford the taxes and upkeep on an empty house and had to sell.

After the war, the executive council hired professional staff and established a central office to assist chapters. At first, the office consolidated initiation records and address lists, published a newsletter and secured the fraternity's historical artifacts. Over time, the staff's size and function grew. Young alumni were hired to visit chapters as educational and leadership consultants, reviewing chapter operations and suggesting ways to improve. Leadership training was developed and expanded, and regular conclaves began to be held to train officers and alumni. Handbooks were published for each officer position and general programs. Alumni associations were given professional advice on fundraising and house renovations. Within twelve years of the end of the war, five chapters were reactivated and four new chapters were chartered.

=== Fraternity firsts ===
Psi Upsilon was the first fraternity to

- Hold a fraternity convention (1841)
- Print a membership catalogue (1842)
- Print the fraternity history (1843)
- Print a fraternity songbook (1849)
- Issue a fraternity magazine (1850)

== Symbols ==
Psi Upsilon's badge is a diamond, with the fraternity's emblem on clasped hands and the Greek letters ΨΥ. Its pledge pin is a garnet and gold diamond.

The fraternity's motto is "Unto us has befallen a mighty friendship". Psi Upsilon's colors are garnet and gold. Its flower is the Alstroemeria liley. Its symbol is the diamond and its mascot is the owl. The fraternity's publication is The Diamond of Psi Upsilon. Its nickname is Psi U.

== Chapters ==
The fraternity has chartered fifty chapters at colleges and universities throughout North America, some of which are inactive.

== Governance ==
Most chapters of Psi Upsilon retain the same type of governance: a president, two vice presidents, a recording secretary, and a treasurer. Its president presides over all meetings and enforces obedience to the constitution and the chapter bylaws. The first vice president is the internal vice president and helps maintain an efficient system of communication among the brothers. The second vice president is the external vice president and serves as coordinator for public relations. The chapter may also have other leadership positions.

Its national headquarters is located at 3003 East 96th Street in Indianapolis, Indiana.

== Controversies and member misconduct ==
=== Co-educational shift ===
In 1971, Bowdoin College, formerly all-male, decided to admit women to the college. The members of Kappa chapter of Psi Upsilon also voted to accept women that year, becoming the first co-ed fraternity on Bowdoin's campus, and in Psi Upsilon. In 1976, Patricia “Barney” Geller attended the national meeting as Kappa's president. Psi U distinguished itself by not revoking Kappa's charter status. Instead the Kappa chapter admitted members of both sexes for as long as it existed and was the first in Psi U to do so.

In 2014, Wesleyan University required all male-only fraternities to become coeducational, partly in response to issues with sexual assault and harassment. At the time, Psi Upsilon and Delta Kappa Epsilon were the only recognized fraternities at the school. After Delta Kappa Epsilon's housing was closed for failing to comply with the changes, Psi Upsilon was the remaining fraternity at the school. The fraternity agreed to become coeducational, but the chapter's housing was temporarily suspended by the school before any female students could join. The closure was pending a drug investigation and past claims of sexual assault . As of September 2016, the chapter's house was expected to reopen with both male and female members.

=== University of Pennsylvania chapter closure ===
On Saturday, January 20, 1990, the brothers of Psi Upsilon's Penn chapter kidnapped a rival fraternity member, subjecting him to various forms of physical and mental abuse. Penn kicked Psi U off campus less than five months later. During the drive, the Psi U officers played a tape of a Malcolm X speech containing references to violence directed at whites. Because this tape was played at a loud volume O'Flanagan believed that no one would be able to hear any possible cries for help. The Psi U officers and pledges drove O'Flanagan to a secluded playground/park area. O’Flanagan said, “I'm not Sheffield, I'm Billy O'Flanagan." Someone then said, “Oh shit." O'Flanagan replied, Take me back now and I'll forget about it. but they ignored his request. They encircled O'Flanagan whispering to him again the phrase 'Sheffield Deathfield'. O'Flanagan told them that he was not Sheffield. They, however, did not release O'Flanagan. They also taunted O'Flanagan by referring to lynchings in the South, in Alabama. O'Flanagan remained handcuffed to the metal structure for some time. He was barefoot and only minimally clothed, and the night was cold and rainy. O'Flanagan was kept at the playground/park area in the custody of two Psi U pledges while the Psi U officers and pledges who had come to this site went to get food and check in by telephone with [a Psi U officer] at the Psi U fraternity house. Before these Psi U officers and pledges left, one of them said to O’Flanagan, 'We're coming back with something you won’t want to eat.' They then conducted a mock “trial" which consisted in part of O'Flanagan's being subjected to physical discomfort, emotional distress, and repeated and intense verbal abuse.

=== Cornell chapter closure ===
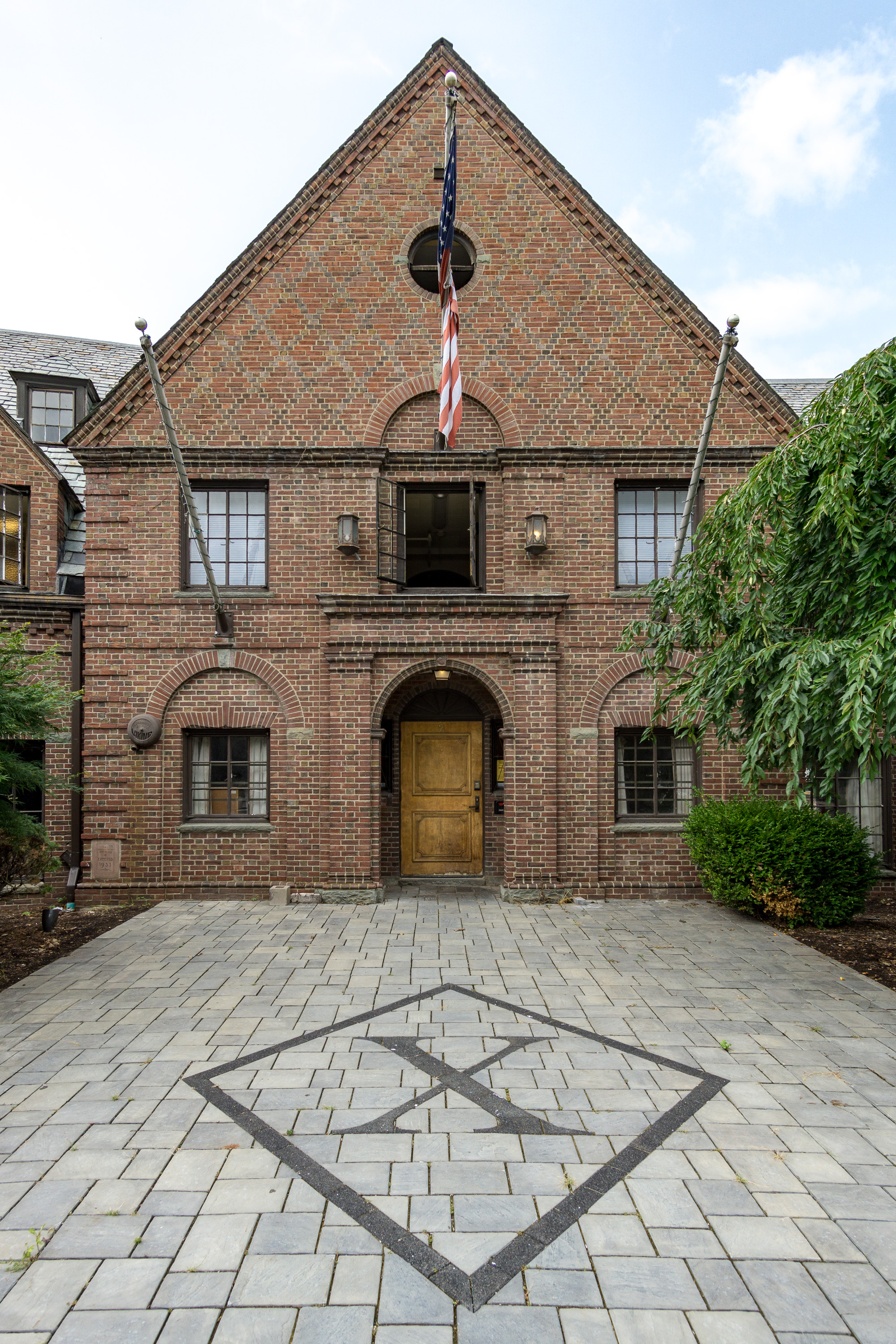
Former Psi Upsilon building at Cornell

In July 2016, the president of Psi Upsilon's Chi chapter at Cornell University was indicted by a grand jury for sexual abuse of a female Cornell student in the fraternity house. The crime allegedly took place in late January of that year, with initial charges brought in early February. In May the accused student sued Cornell University, saying that their investigation process was flawed and non-compliant with recent changes in State law. The chapter has been suspended by both the national leadership of the fraternity, and Cornell University, although the university cited other violations. Following a racist assault on a Black student by white members of the house in September 2017, the chapter's alumni board voted to close the chapter indefinitely.

== See also ==
- List of social fraternities
- Pi Chapter House of Psi Upsilon Fraternity
- Xi Chapter, Psi Upsilon Fraternity
