= Cornelius Ver Bryck =

American artist

- Born: January 1, 1813; New Jersey, United States
- Died: May 31, 1844 (aged 31); New York, United States
- Occupation: Artist

Cornelius Ver Bryck (January 1, 1813 – May 31, 1844) was an American portrait painter. He was active until his death in 1844, aged 31.

== Early life ==
Ver Bryck was born in Yaugh Paugh, New Jersey, in 1813.

== Career ==
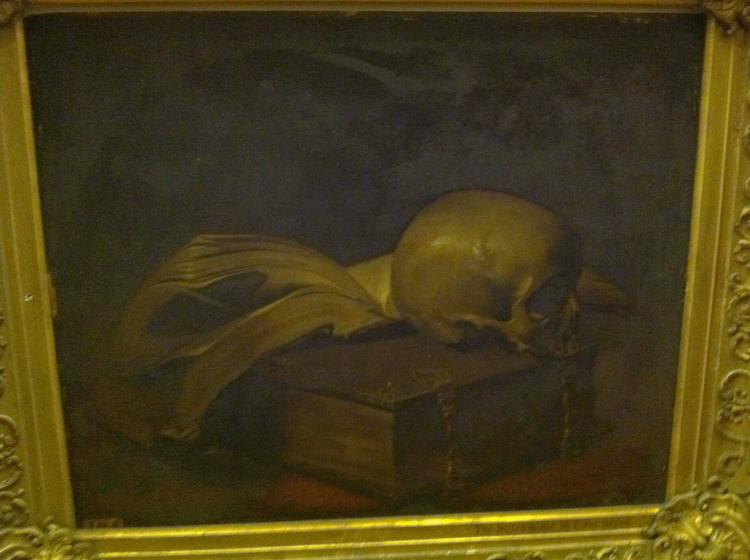
Ver Bryck's The Dutch Bible oil-on-canvas (1836)

In 1833, he painted fellow artist Thomas Sully. The oil-on-canvas original is in the possession of Brooklyn Museum.

He began studying under Samuel F. B. Morse in 1835. The following year, he was elected an associate member of the National Academy of Design. He became a member in 1840.

== Personal life ==
A portrait of Ver Bryck was undertaken by Henry Inman (1801–1846) in the first half of the 19th century.

A decline in his health resulted in Ver Bryck relocating to Mobile, Alabama, for the winter of 1837–1838. He also spent several months in Tuscaloosa. He sold two paintings he had brought with him—Bacchante and Cavalier—the whereabouts of both are now not known. With his health partially restored, he returned to New York in the spring of 1838. He then left for Europe with Daniel Huntington and Huntington's student Henry Peters Gray. After his return the following year, in response to his sister falling ill, he was diagnosed with tuberculosis. In 1843, he sailed to England. His new wife, the sister of Huntington's wife, was painted by Samuel Fanshaw (1814–1888) just before they left.

Ver Bryck was a member of the Urban Chapter of the Alpha Delta Phi Society.

== Death ==
Ver Bryck died in New York in 1844, aged 31. He was interred in Green-Wood Cemetery in Brooklyn, in a site chosen by himself, his grave adjoining that of Alexander J. Swift.

Thomas Cole was commissioned by the Academy to compose a eulogy of Ver Bryck. It was printed in the Evening Post for the Country on August 7, 1844.
