= Xi Chapter, Psi Upsilon Fraternity =

Historic house in Middletown, Connecticut, US

- U.S. National Register of Historic Places
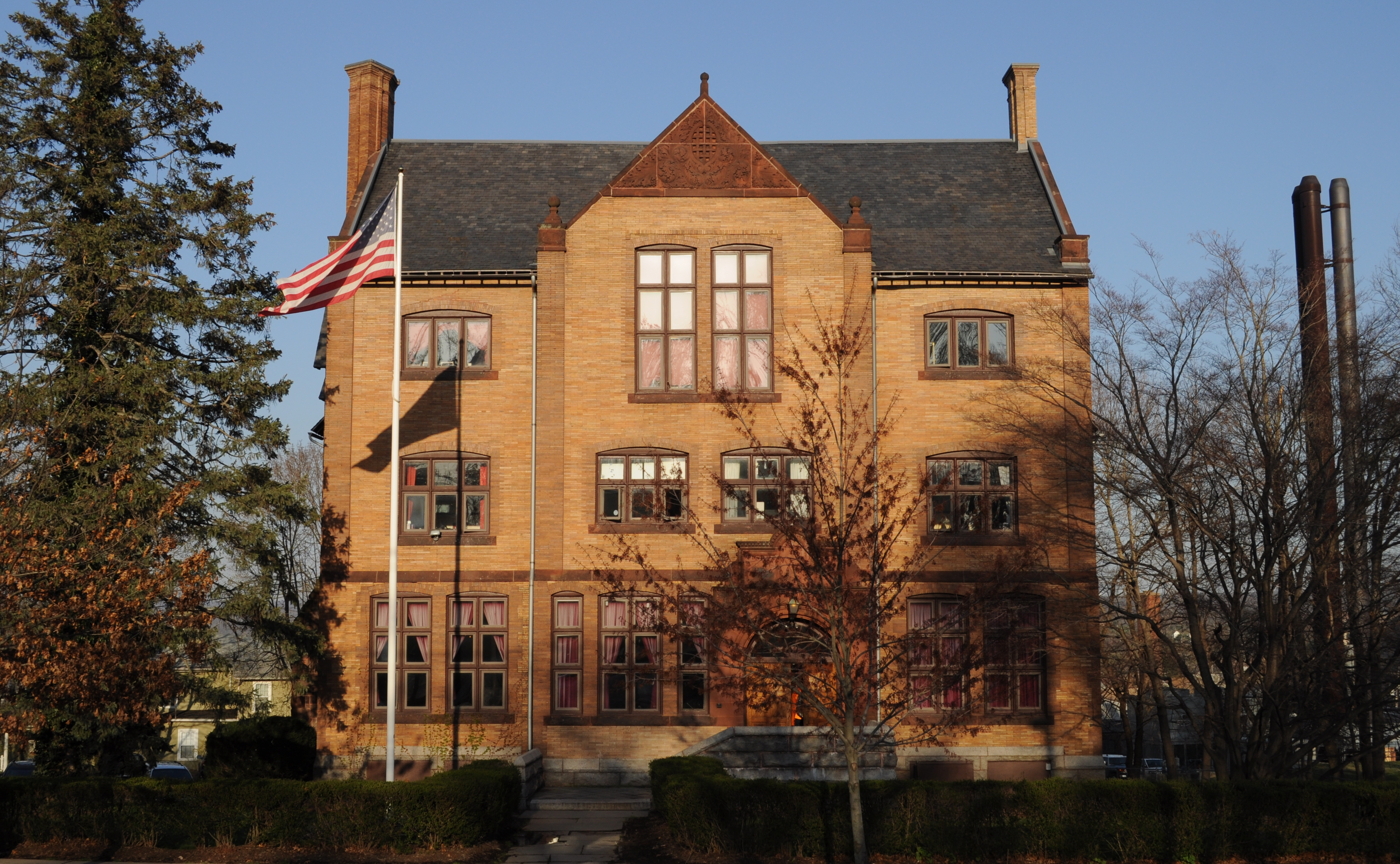

- Location within Connecticut Location within the United States
- Location: 242 High Street, Middletown, Connecticut
- Coordinates: 41°33′24″N 72°39′18″W
- Area: less than one acre
- Built: 1891
- Architect: Colin C. Wilson
- Architectural style: Romanesque, Jacobean
- NRHP reference No.: 09000870
- Added to NRHP: November 4, 2009

The Xi Chapter, Psi Upsilon Fraternity, also known as the Psi Upsilon Fraternity Building, is a fraternity chapter house at Wesleyan University in Middletown, Connecticut in the United States. Built between 1891 and 1893, the house is an architecturally significant example of Richardsonian Romanesque and Jacobethan style architecture. It was the first purpose-built residential fraternity house in the United States and became a model for future buildings. It was listed on the National Register of Historic Places in 2009.

== History ==
The Psi Upsilon fraternity was founded in 1833 at Union College. Its Xi chapter at Wesleyan University in Middletown, Connecticut was founded in about 1843. It was the first national fraternity to have a chapter at Wesleyan. By the late 19th century, the chapter was one of the leading fraternities on the campus: its members were often leaders of the school's sports teams, and won many academic awards. The chapter became coed in 2015.

The fraternity chapter built its chapter house at 242 High Street between 1891 and 1893, replacing its former house at 126 Broad Street. The new chapter house was located across the street from the main campus of Wesleyan University. It cost $40,000 ($1,433,333 in 2024). This was the first purpose-built residential fraternity house in the United States. It was considered the "model fraternity house" and its high style and designed set a standard for future chapter houses built by other American fraternities.

It was listed on the National Register of Historic Places in November 4, 2009 as the Xi Chapter, Psi Upsilon Fraternity (aka Psi Upsilon Fraternity Building.

== Architecture ==
The Xi Chapter, Psi Upsilon Fraternity house was designed by Colin C. Wilson, an English architect who was chosen over competitors including the noted New York firm Carrère and Hastings. At the time, Wilson was young and relatively unknown. However, Wilson was recommended by the London-based alumnus who funded the majority of the construction cost.

The Xi Chapter, Psi Upsilon Fraternity house is located on the Fraternity Row on the east side of the central Wesleyan campus, at the southeast corner of High and College Streets. It is a distinctive example of Richardsonian Romanesque and Jacobian style, with four-storis in the front and three stories in the back. It is an eclectic masonry structure, mainly with load-bearing yellow Pompeian brick and trimmed in a variety of materials, including terracotta and brownstone and granite from It has stucco and half-timbering in its gable ends.

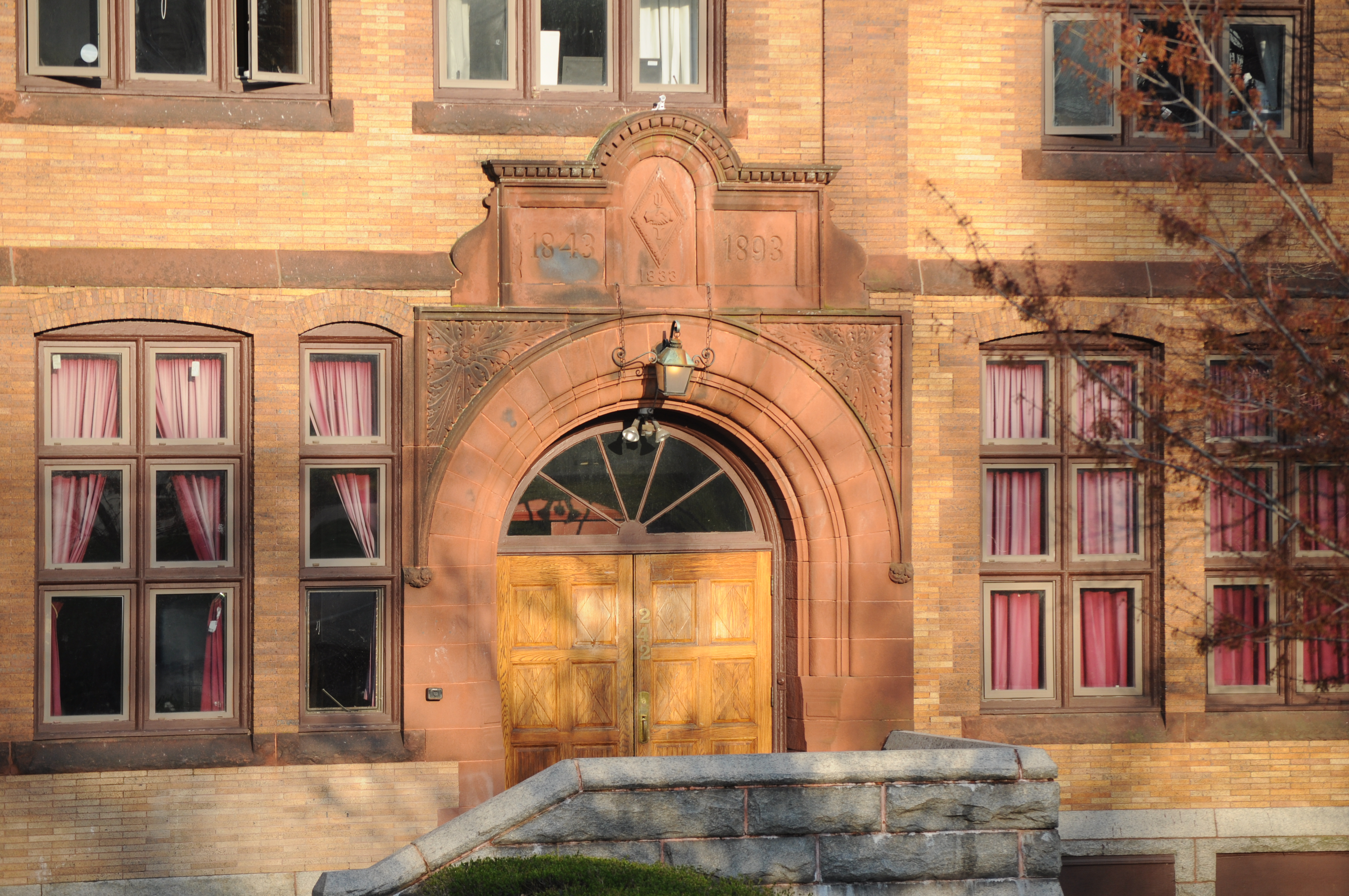
Detail of Xi Chapter, Psi Upsilon Fraternity entrance

The house features an arched entrance, several chimneys, a turret, a slate roof, and steep intersecting gables. The entrance features a Roman arch made of brownstone, pilasters with brownstone capitals, a large fanlight and a double-leaf, paneled doors. Over the entrance is a brownstone plaque with the fraternity's crest and dates. Its windows are leaded glass. Most of its window openings have segmented arch tops, with brick headers and brownstone sills. The building corners are finished in darker stone or brick in quoining patterns.

On the north side, the chapter house has an open porch or loggia with ironwork railings between brownstone columns and capitals with carvings of stylized leaves. A second porch is at the rear of the house and features columns with rock-faced or rusticated granite discs.

Its interior is largely reflective of a major restyling done in 1916. The first floor includes three large rooms, with built-in wooden seating and a paneled wainscot. A mezzanine projects into the dining room and features a colonnade with arched spandrels, wooden corbels, and wood paneling. The upper floors include bedrooms and a chapter room.

== See also ==
- North American fraternity and sorority housing
