= Daniel Huntington (artist) =

American painter (1816–1906)

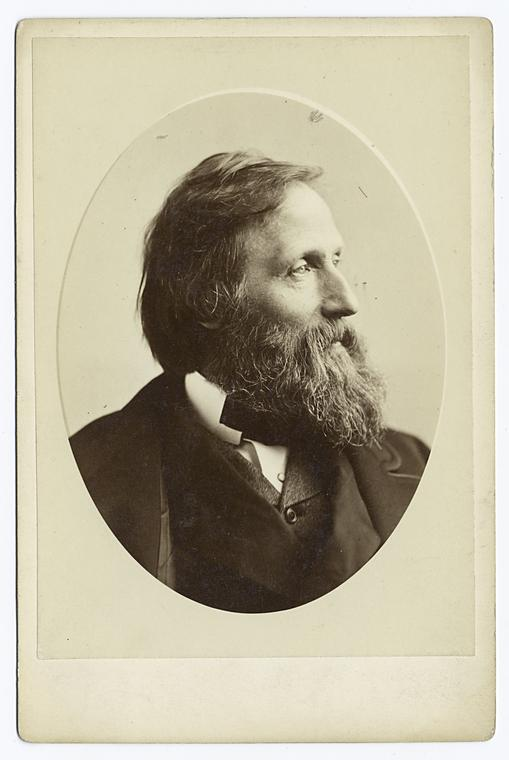
- Born: October 4, 1816; New York City, New York, U.S.
- Died: April 19, 1906 (aged 89); New York City, New York, U.S.
- Education: Yale University; Hamilton College
- Parent(s): Benjamin Huntington, Jr. Faith Trumbull Huntington
- Relatives: Benjamin Huntington (grandfather)

Daniel Huntington (October 4, 1816 – April 19, 1906) was an American artist who belonged to the art movement known as the Hudson River School and later became a prominent portrait painter.

== Early life ==
Huntington was born in New York City, New York on October 4, 1816. He was the son of Benjamin Huntington, Jr. and Faith (née Trumbull) Huntington. His paternal grandfather was Benjamin Huntington, delegate at the Second Continental Congress and first U.S. Representative from Connecticut. His brother Jedediah Vincent Huntington was a clergyman and novelist. His maternal grandfather was Jedediah Huntington (1743–1818) of Norwich, Connecticut, who served as a General in the American Revolutionary War.

He studied at Yale with Samuel F.B. Morse, and later with Henry Inman. From 1833 to 1835, he transferred to Hamilton College in Clinton, New York, where he met Charles Loring Elliott, who encouraged him to become an artist.

== Career ==
Huntington first exhibited his work at the National Academy of Design in 1836. Subsequently, he painted some landscapes in the tradition of the Hudson River School. Huntington made several trips to Europe, the first in 1839 traveling to England, Rome, Florence and Paris with his friend and pupil Henry Peters Gray. On his return to America in 1840, he painted his allegorical painting "Mercy's Dream", which brought him fame and confirmed his interest in inspirational subjects. He also painted portraits and began the illustration of The Pilgrim's Progress. In 1844, he went back to Rome.

Returning to New York around 1846, he devoted his time chiefly to portrait-painting, although he painted many genre, religious and historical subjects. From 1851 to 1859, he was in England. He was president of the National Academy of Design from 1862 to 1870, and again in 1877–1890. He was also vice president of the Metropolitan Museum of Art in New York.

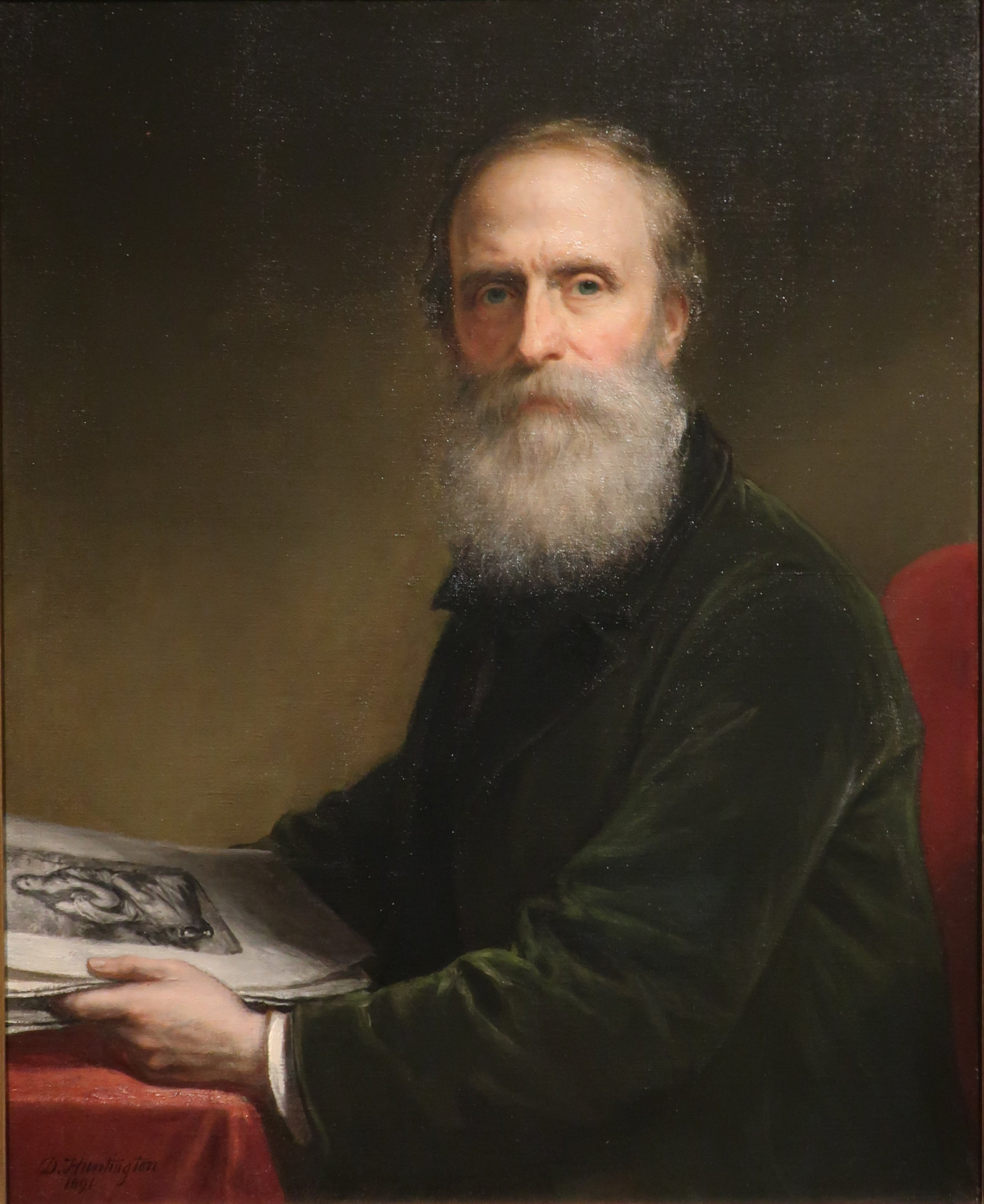
Self-portrait by Daniel Huntington, 1891

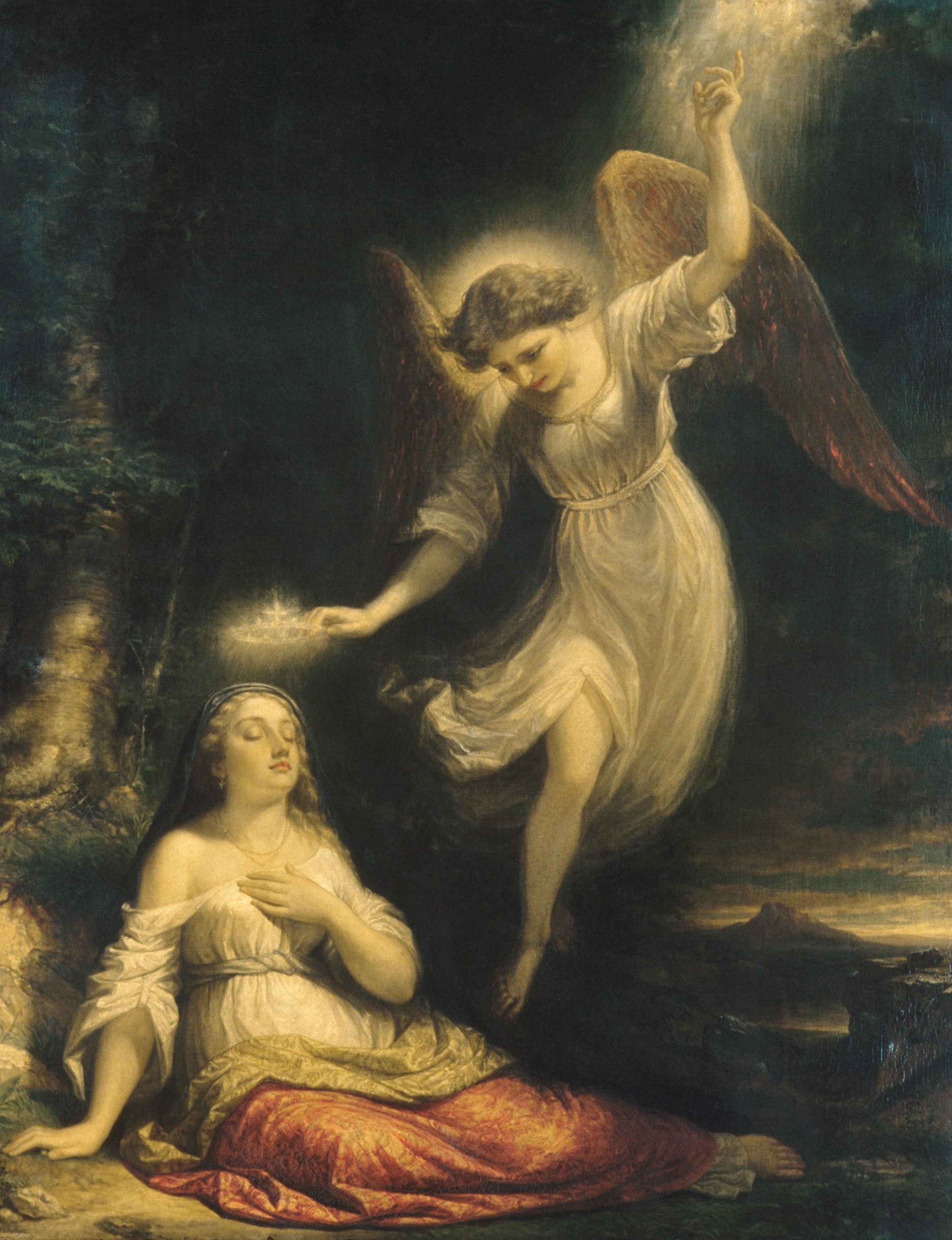
Mercy's Dream

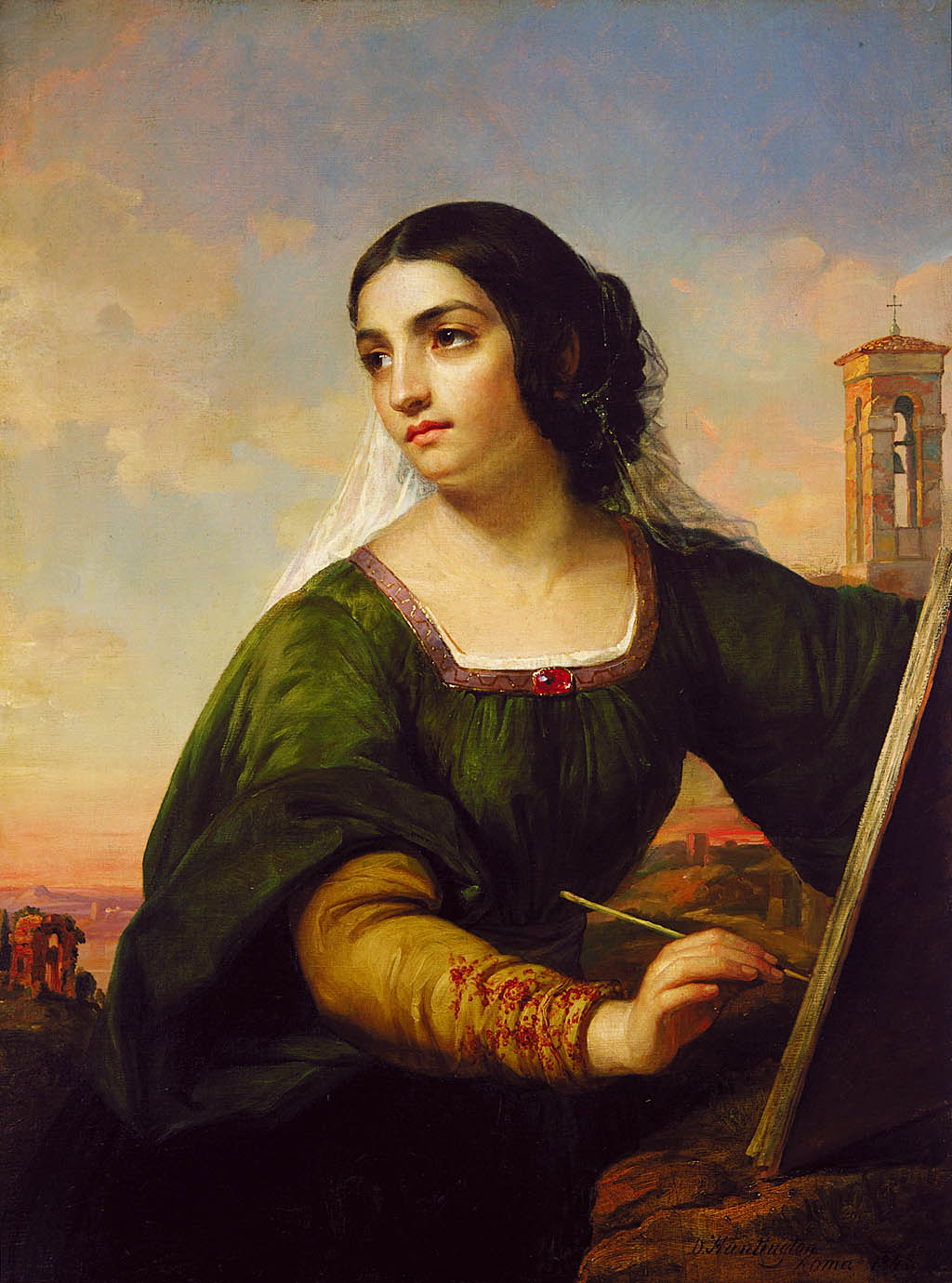
Italy, 1843

== Personal life ==
Huntington was married to Harriet Sophia Richards (1821–1893), a daughter of Charles H. Richards and Sarah (née Hayward) Richards. Together, they were the parents of Charles Richards Huntington (1847–1915), a merchant. He was the brother-in-law of fellow painter Cornelius Ver Bryck.

Huntington died in New York City on April 19, 1906. He was buried at Green-Wood Cemetery in Brooklyn.

== Works ==
Among his principal works are:

- "The Florentine Girl"
- "Early Christian Prisoners"
- "The Shepherd Boy of the Campagna"
- "The Roman Penitents"
- "Christiana and Her Children"
- "Queen Mary signing the Death-Warrant of Lady Jane Grey"
- "Feckenham in the Tower" (1850)
- "Chocorua" (1860)
- "Republican Court in the Time of Washington" containing sixty-four careful portraits (1861)
- "Philosophy and Christian Art" (1868)
- "Sowing the Word" (1869)
- "St Jerome, Juliet on the Balcony" (1870)
- "The Narrows, Lake George" (1871)
- "Clement VII. and Charles V. at Bologna"
- "Goldsmiths Daughter" (1884)

His principal portraits are:

- "President Lincoln" in Union League Club, New York
- "Chancellor Ferris of New York University
- General J.G. Totten (1857)at Berkshire Museum
- "Sir Charles Eastlake and the earl of Carlyle," the property of the New York Historical Society
- "President Van Buren" in the State Library at Albany
- "James Lenox" in the Lenox Library
- "Louis Agassiz" (1856-1857)
- "William Cullen Bryant" (1866)
- "Julia Livingston Delafield" (1873)
- "Jefferson Davis" (1874)
- "John Adams Dix" (1880)
- "John Sherman" (1881)
- "Alexander Ramsey" (1881)
- "Chester A. Arthur" (1885)

Gallery

Portrait of David Olifant Vail (1834-1865), Private collection

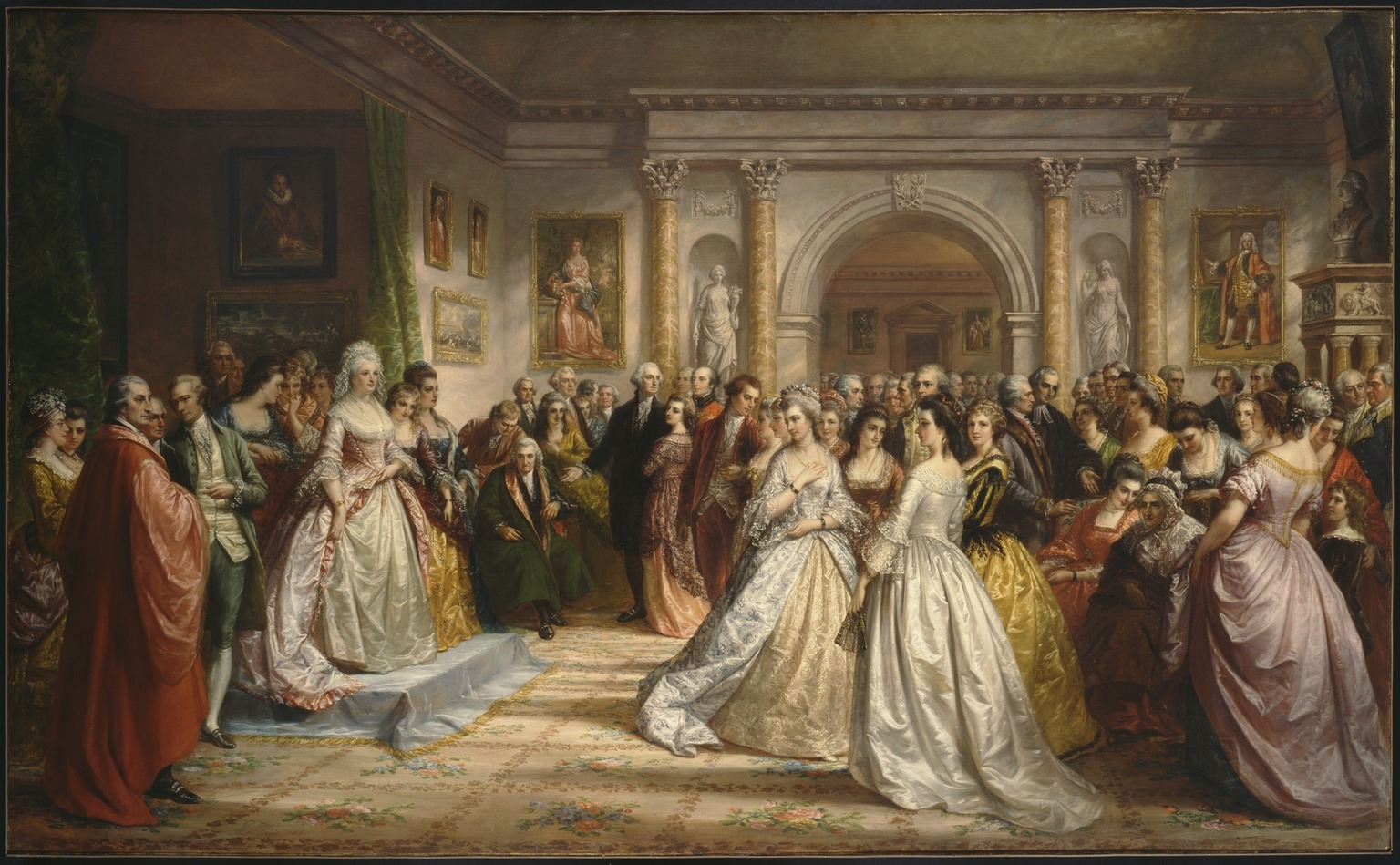
The Republican Court (Lady Washington's Reception Day), Brooklyn Museum, 1861

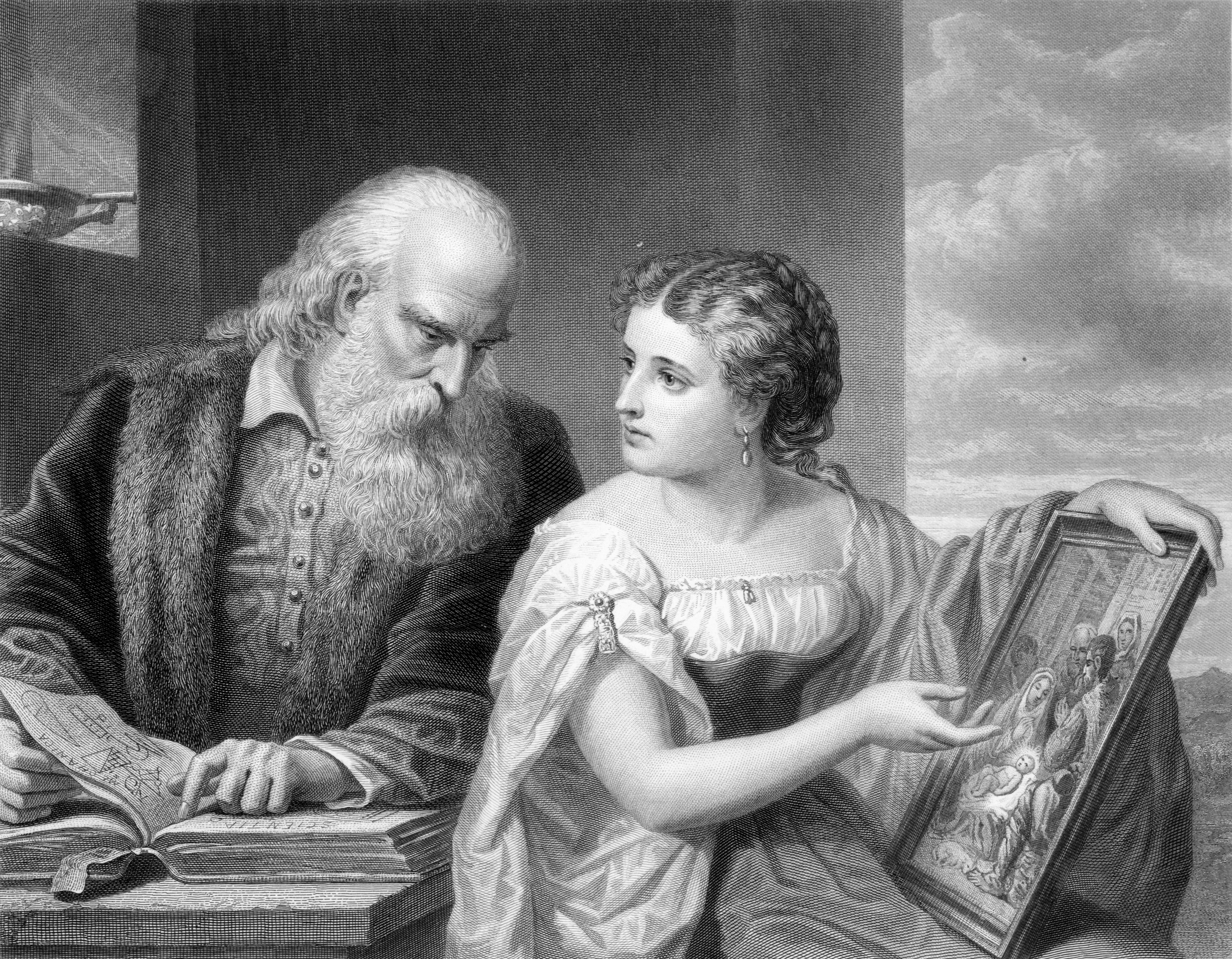
An engraving after Huntington's Philosophy and Christian Art, 1868

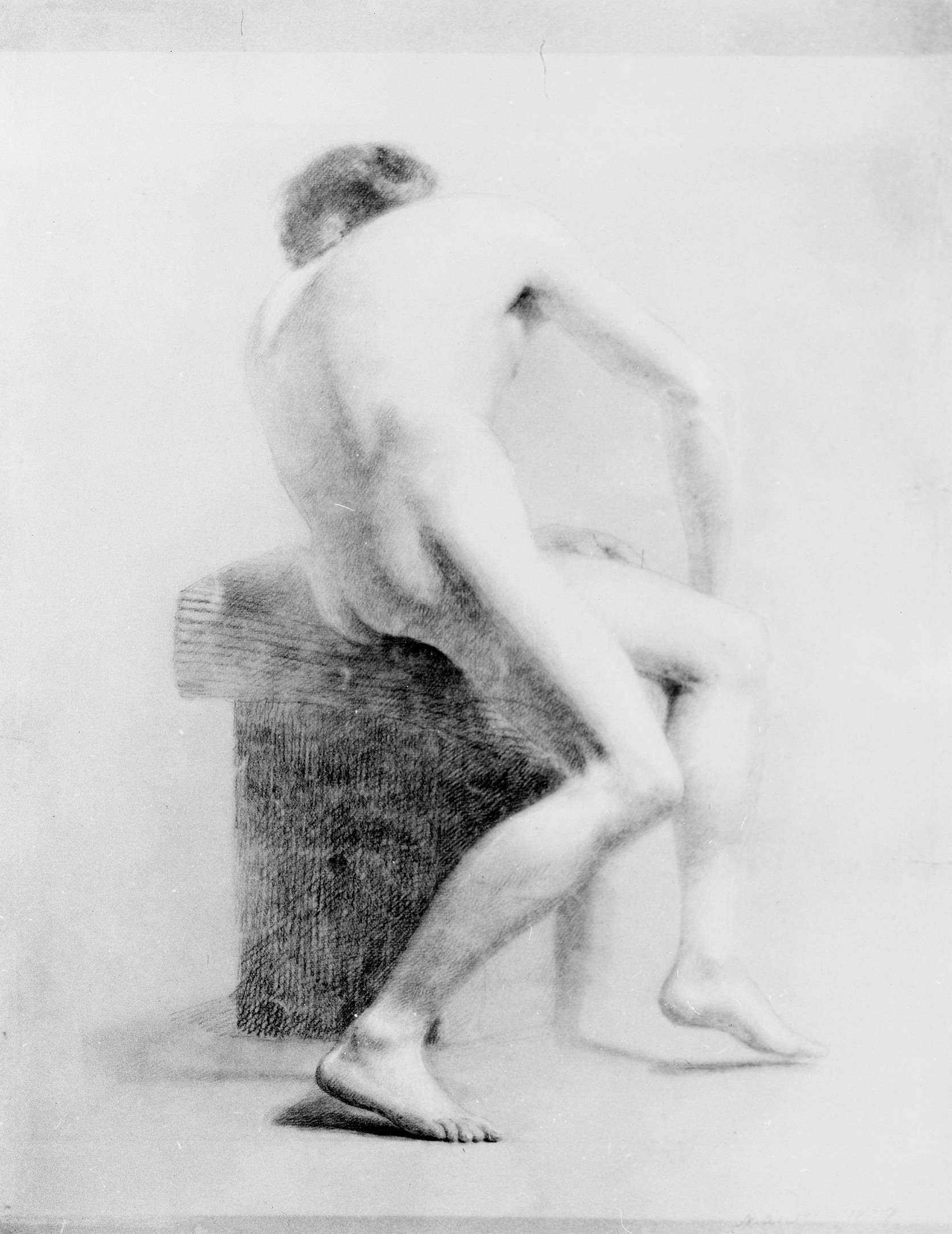
Seated Male Nude, 1838

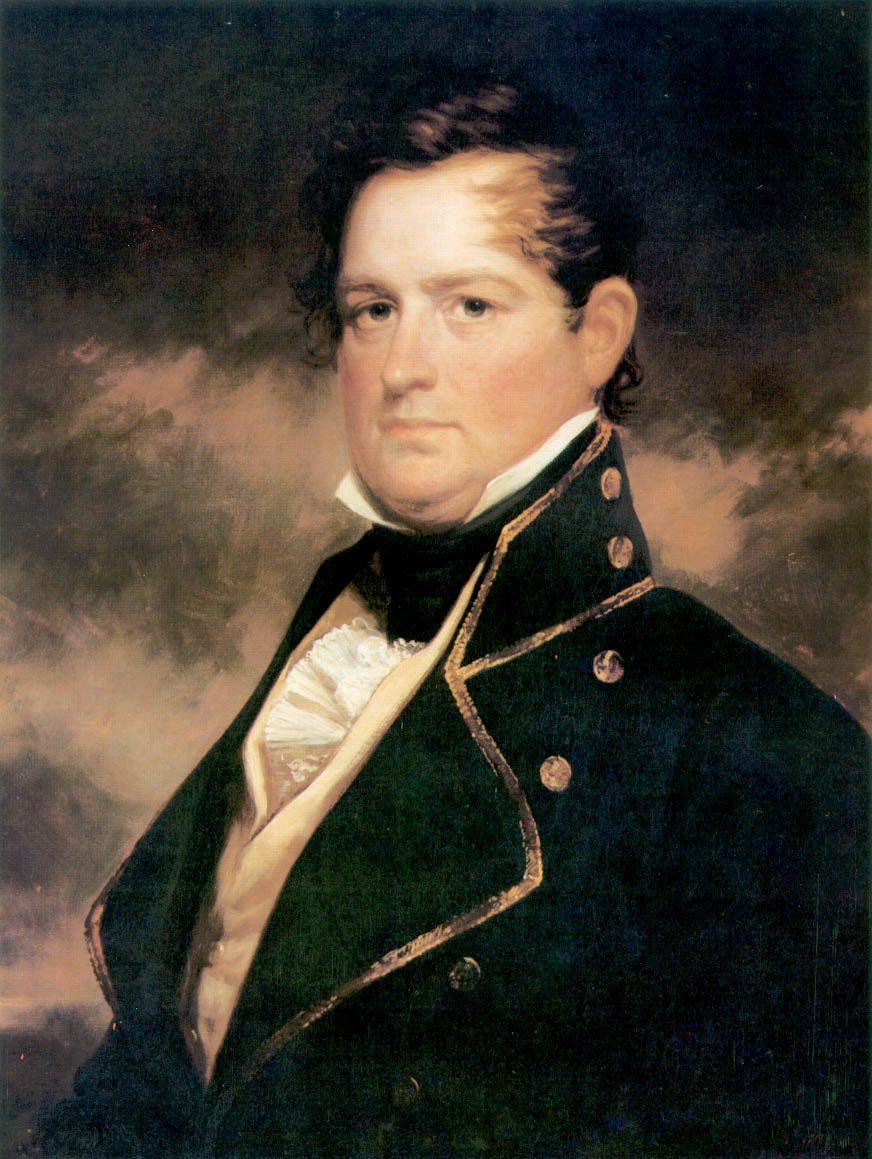
Peter Buell Porter (1773-1844), US politician, general of the War of 1812 and Secretary of War.,1873
