= Pi Chapter House of Psi Upsilon Fraternity =

Historic fraternity house in Syracuse, New York

- U.S. National Register of Historic Places
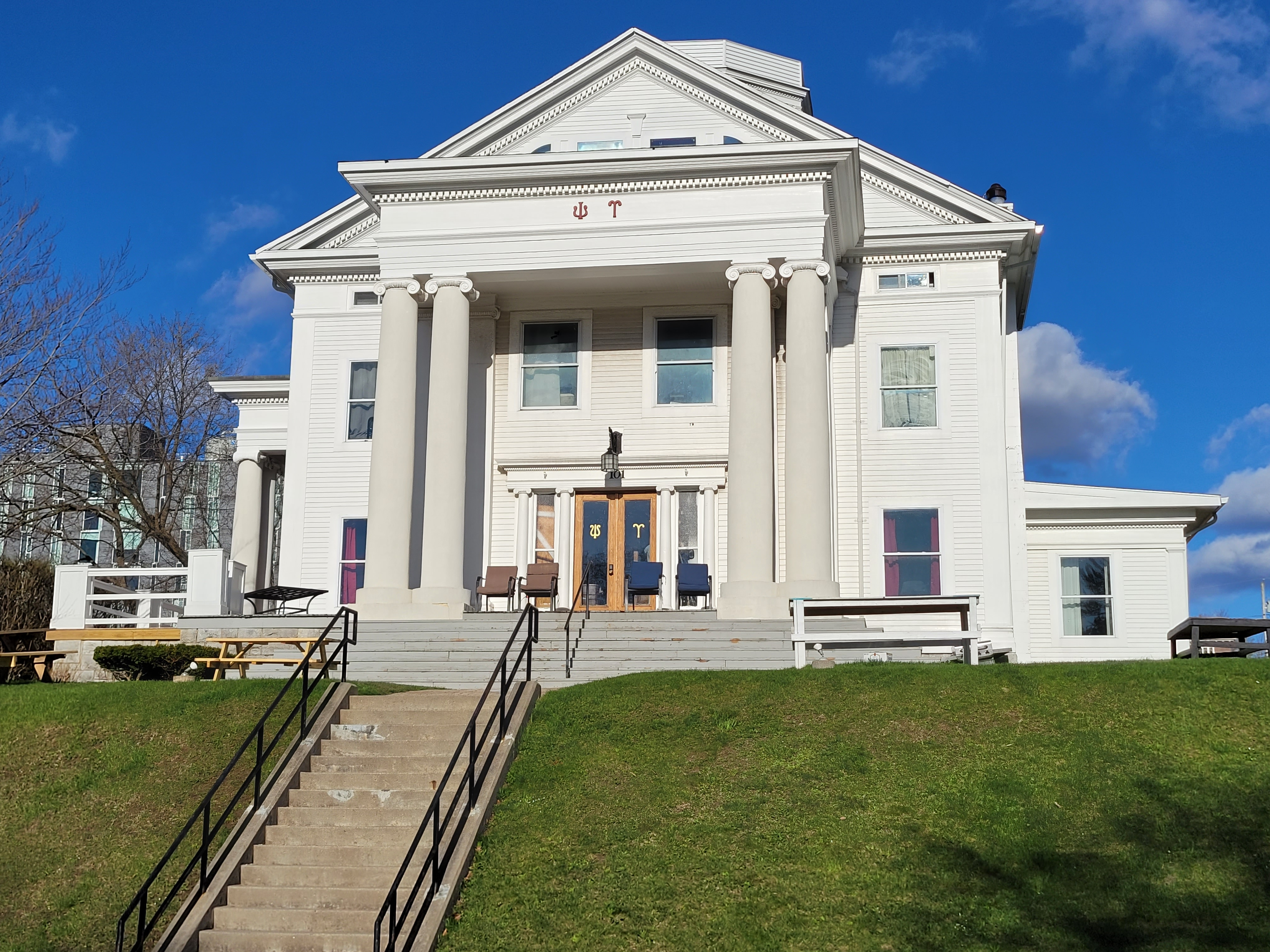
- Pi chapter house, 2022

- Location within New York Location within the United States
- Location: 101 College Place, Syracuse, New York
- Coordinates: 43°2′21.63″N 76°7′53.8″W
- Built: 1898
- Architect: W. W. Taber
- Architectural style: Classical Revival
- NRHP reference No.: 85001124
- Added to NRHP: May 16, 1985

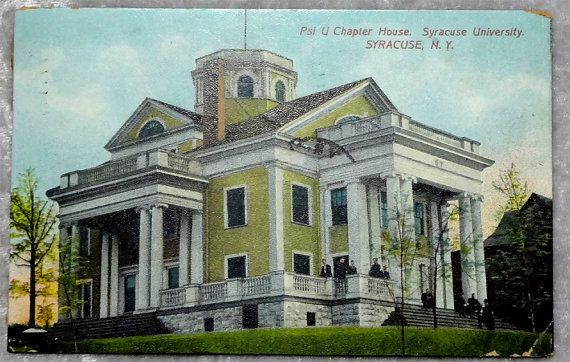
Pi chapter house, 1910.

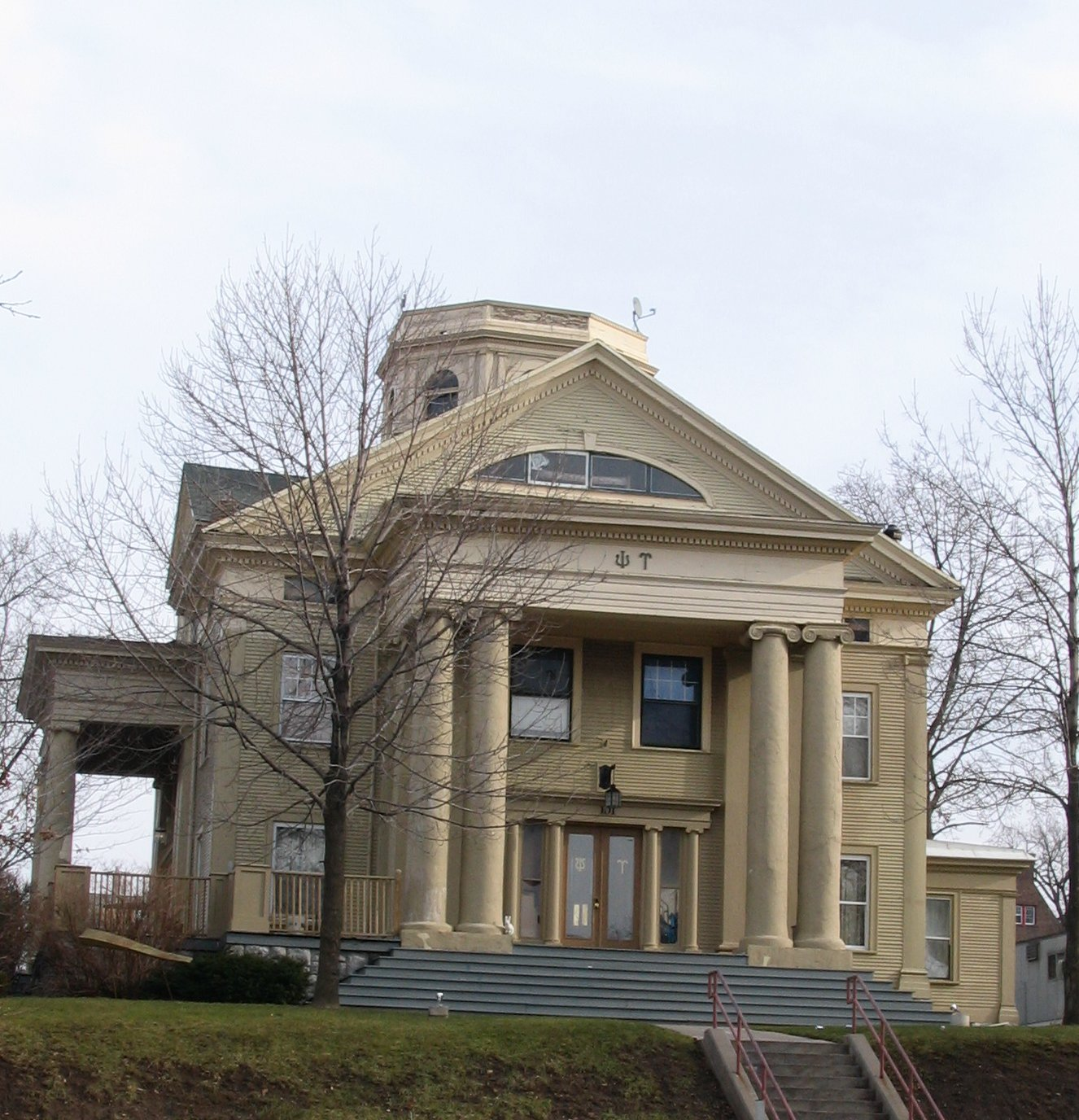
Pi chapter house, c. 2008.

The Pi Chapter House of Psi Upsilon Fraternity is a building on the Syracuse University campus. It was designed by Wellington W. Taber and built for Psi Upsilon fraternity in 1898. Pi Chapter House was listed on the National Register of Historic Places in 1985.

Pi Chapter House is architecturally significant for its Neoclassical design and its historic role as "the oldest intact surviving fraternity residence at Syracuse University and for its association with the emergence of fraternal organizations as major components of Syracuse college life at the turn of the 20th century."

The building underwent a $350,000 facade renovation in phases between 2009 and September 2014. The renovations were intended to restore the house to its historical architectural integrity. The exterior was painted white, replacing the darker yellow tint enduring since the mid-1970s.

The Pi chapter of Psi Upsilon was established at Syracuse University in 1875, but was operating before that when SU was known as Genesee College, under the name Upsilon Kappa. Upsilon Kappa was a secret society that disbanded after every chapter meeting, in an effort to preserve secrecy without members lying to outsiders about their participation.

== See also ==
- List of Registered Historic Places in Onondaga County, New York
- North American fraternity and sorority housing
