= Alice Donlevy =

British-American artist and writer

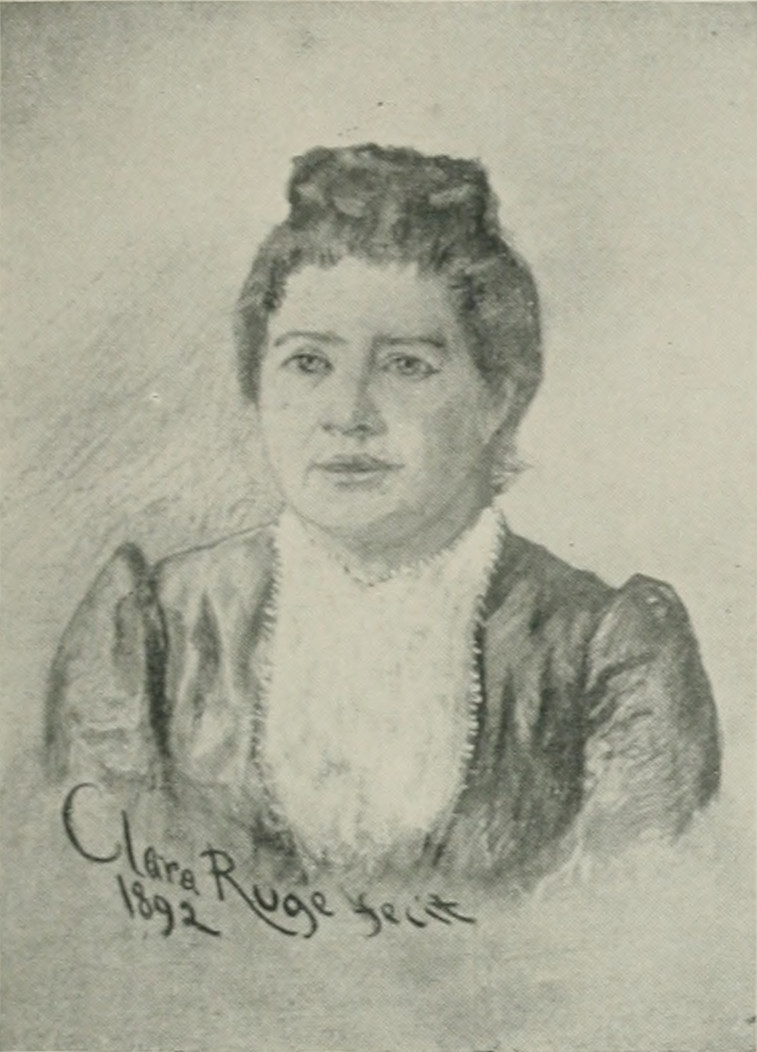
Donlevy in Women of the Year, 1893

Alice Heighes Donlevy (7 January 1846 – 1929) was a British-American artist and writer on art, who specialized in wood engraving and illumination. She served as the art editor of Demorest's Magazine.

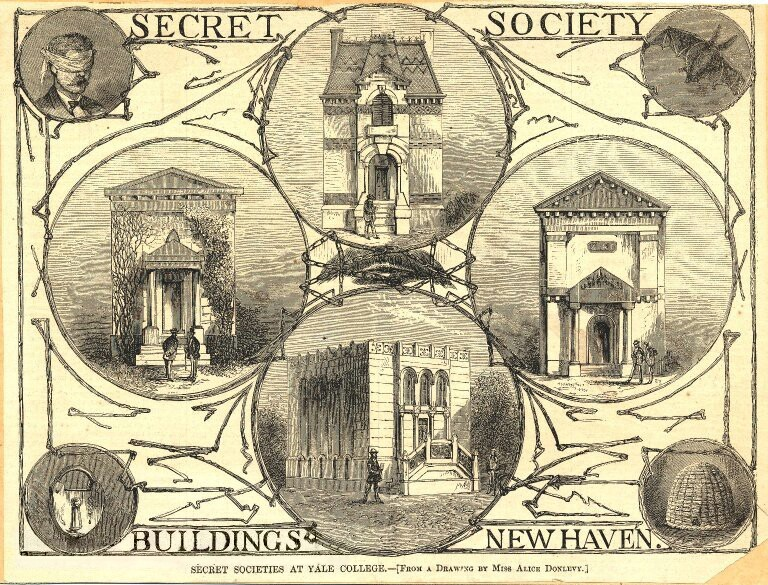
"Secret Society Buildings New Haven," from a drawing by Alice Donlevy (ca. 1880)

== Early years and education ==
Born in Manchester, England, 7 January 1846, Donlevy came to the United States in her infancy, after the death of her mother. In 1854, her father, the inventor-engraver, John Intaglio Donlevy, married Harriet Farley.

In 1856, Horace Greeley took Donlevy to the New York School of Design, a free art school for Women founded in 1852. Greeley convinced the school's director, Henry Herrick, to allow the 10-year-old girl to begin studying the arts of engraving. When the School was moved to the Cooper Union in 1858, Donlevy went with it. For seven years, she devoted her attention to designing wood-engravings for books and magazines, being one of the first workers in this art to introduce that original feature of American wood-engraving, the use of dots instead of lines for shades and shadows. Later, engraving was given up for designing for decoration. Since childhood, she drew with pen and ink for reproduction, her father, John Intaglio Donlevy, having invented certain valuable reproductive processes. She exhibited, while still very young, in the Academy of Design, and won prizes for general attainments. She received a second prize awarded by the Philadelphia Sketch Club for illumination. At the age of 14, she wrote for the press.

== Career ==
In 1867, Donlevy published "Practical Hints on the Art of Illumination". The manual, illustrated with Donlevy's original artwork, encouraged artists working for industry as copyists to learn the arts of design. Thereafter, she wrote for the Art Review of Boston, the Art Amateur, the Art Interchange, St. Nicholas, Harper's Young People, The Ladies' World, Demorest's Magazine, and the Chautauquan. She served as the art editor of Demorest's Magazine.

In 1867, she was one of the nine professional women artists who founded the Ladies' Art Association in New York. Among the new professions for women established by the association was that of porcelain painting. In 1887, Donlevy was one of the committee of three to go to Albany, New York and lay before the New York State Legislature plans of free art industrial instruction for talented boys, girls and women, to be given during vacation seasons and on Saturday afternoons. The bill passed both houses. It was defeated later by eight votes when called up for reconsideration by Robert Ray Hamilton. Probably the best work of Donlevy was the aid that she personally gave to promote the interests of struggling associations and individual artists through free lectures and free lessons, and also by giving the latter introduction by means of public receptions at which their works were exhibited.

Donlevy died in 1929. Her papers are held by the New York Public Library.

== Selected works ==
- (1867) Practical hints on the art of illumination
