= Henry Peters Gray =

American painter

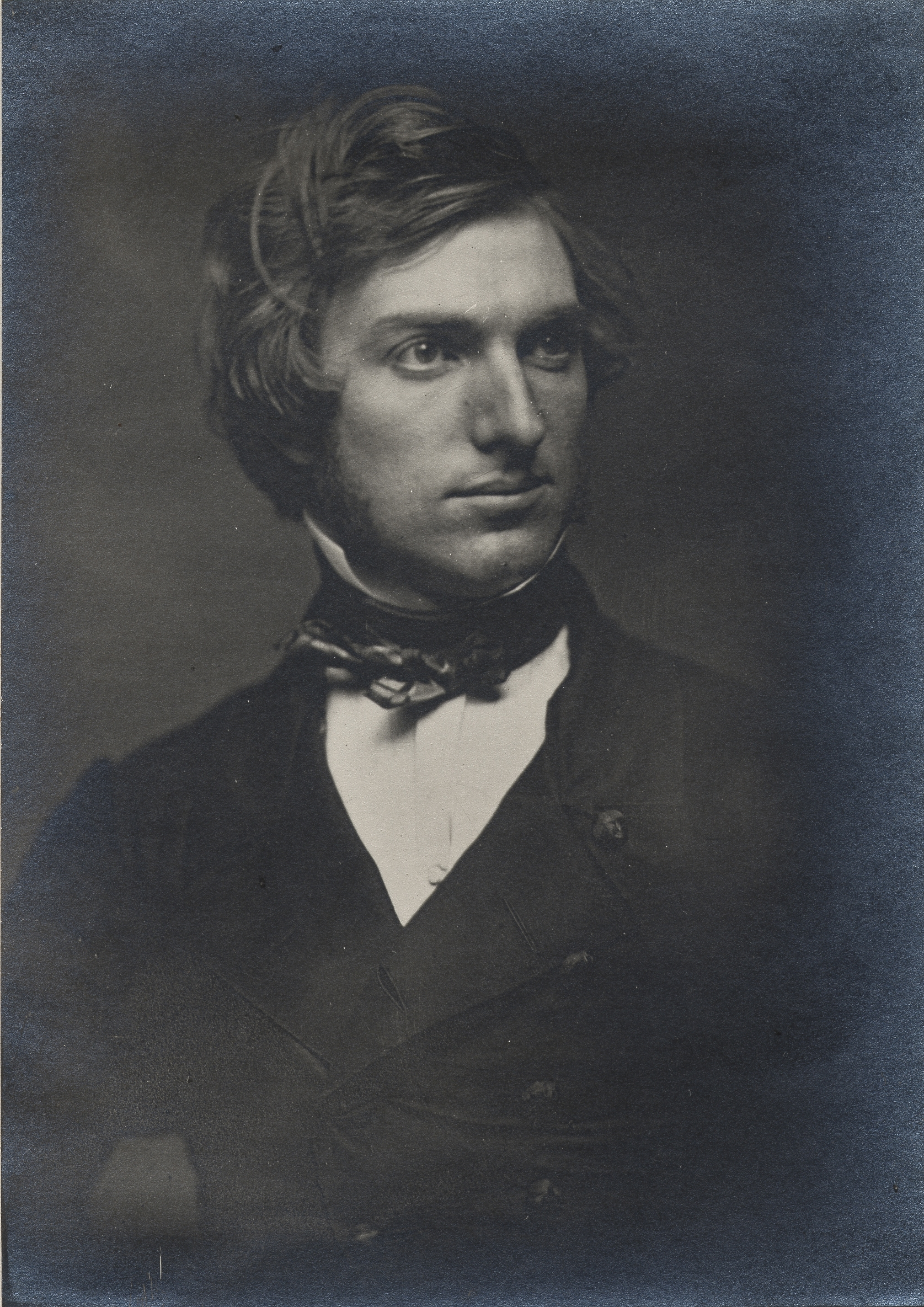
- Born: Henry Peters Gray; June 23, 1819; New York City, United States
- Died: 12 November 1877 (aged 58); New York City, United States
- Education: Daniel Huntington
- Known for: Painting, drawing
- Notable work: The Greek Lovers (1846); The Wages of War (1848); The Pride of the Village (1859)

Henry Peters Gray (June 23, 1819 - November 12, 1877) was an American portrait and genre painter.

== Early life ==
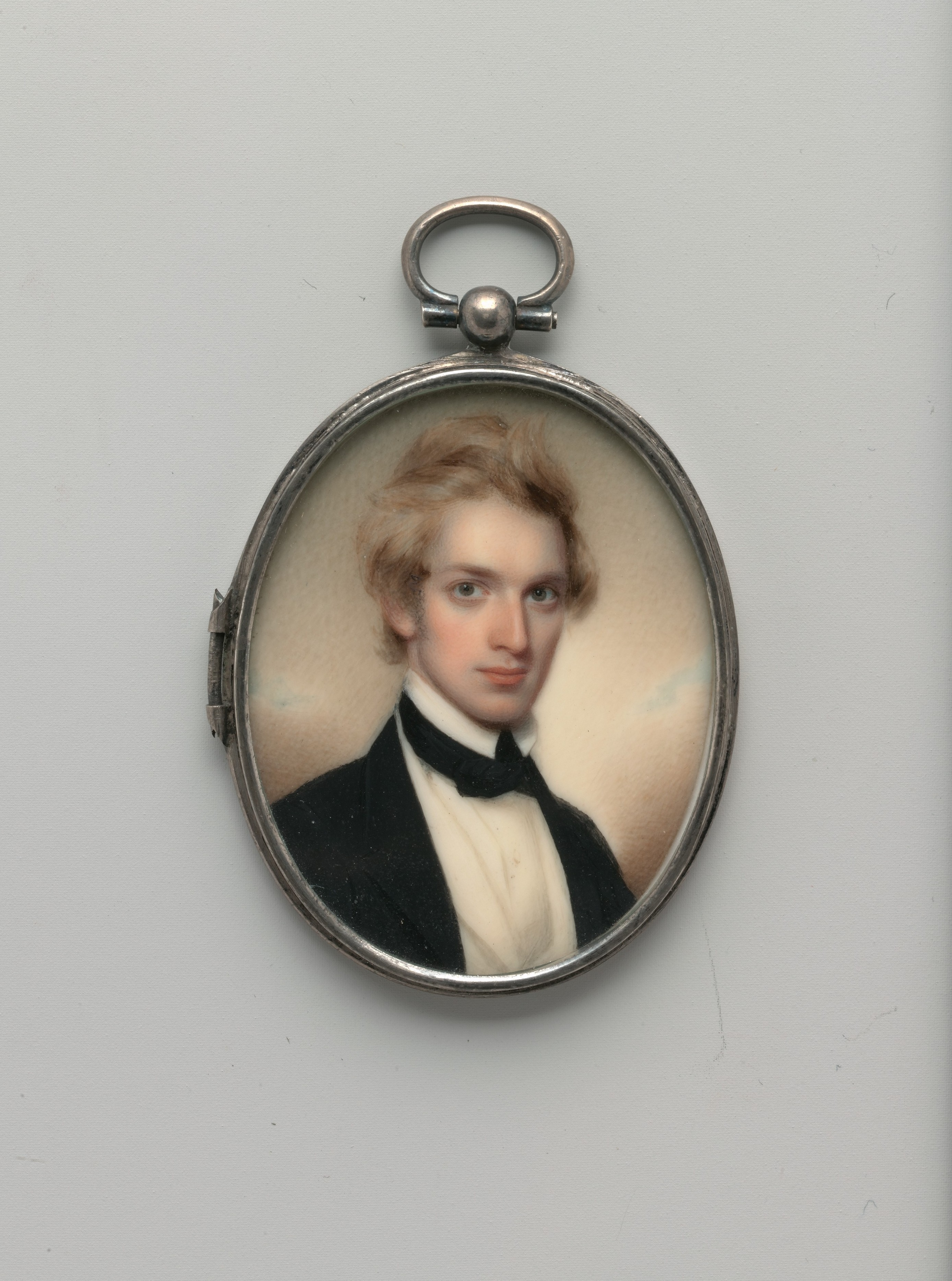
Watercolor miniature portrait of Gray by Henry Colton Shumway (1807–1884), at the Metropolitan Museum of Art, 1842

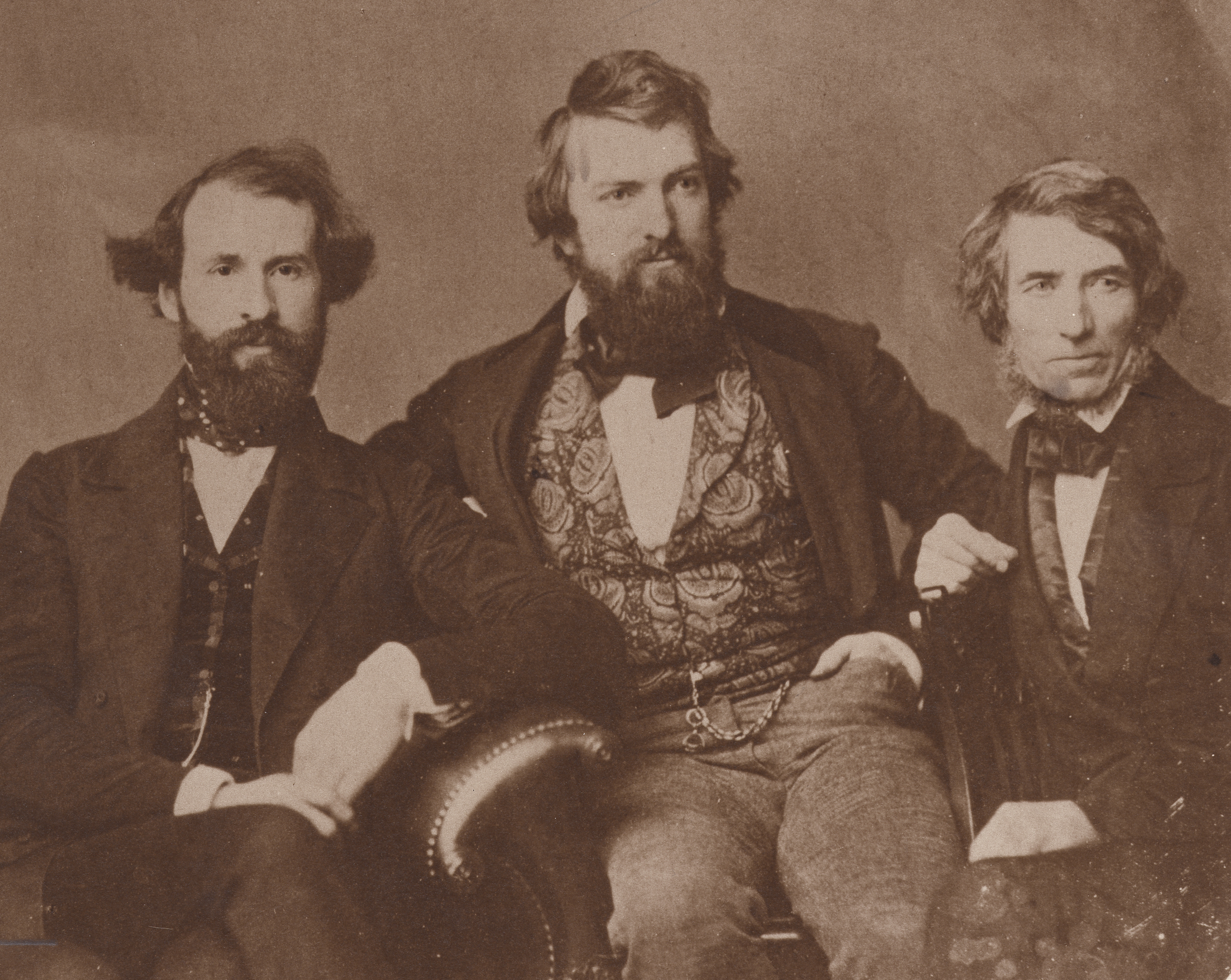
L to R.: Henry Kirke Brown, Henry Peters Gray and Asher Brown Durand, 1850

Born in New York City he was a pupil of Daniel Huntington in New York, and subsequently studied in Rome and Florence.

== Career ==
Elected a member of the National Academy of Design in 1842, he succeeded Huntington as president in 1870, holding the position until 1871.

The later years of his life were devoted to portrait work. He was strongly influenced by the old Italian masters, painting in mellow colour with a classical tendency. One of his notable canvases was an allegorical composition called "The Birth of our Flag" (1875). He died in New York City.

=== Major works ===
The Greek Lovers was painted by Gray after a trip to Italy, where he was greatly influenced by the art of the Italian Renaissance. This painting was very well received in its day, and reflects the nineteenth-century fascination with Greco-Roman antiquity.

The Pride of the Village was based on Washington Irving’s story of the same name and is about a beautiful and simple country girl, the proverbial "pride of the village," who fell in love with an army officer. When the officer is transferred to another post, he asks that she accompany him, however, her pure mind was so upset by this indecorous suggestion that she pined away, surrounded by her devoted family. The painting shows her in her decline, possibly "thinking of her faithless lover?—or were her thoughts wandering to that distant churchyard, into whose bosom she might soon be gathered?"

== Gallery ==
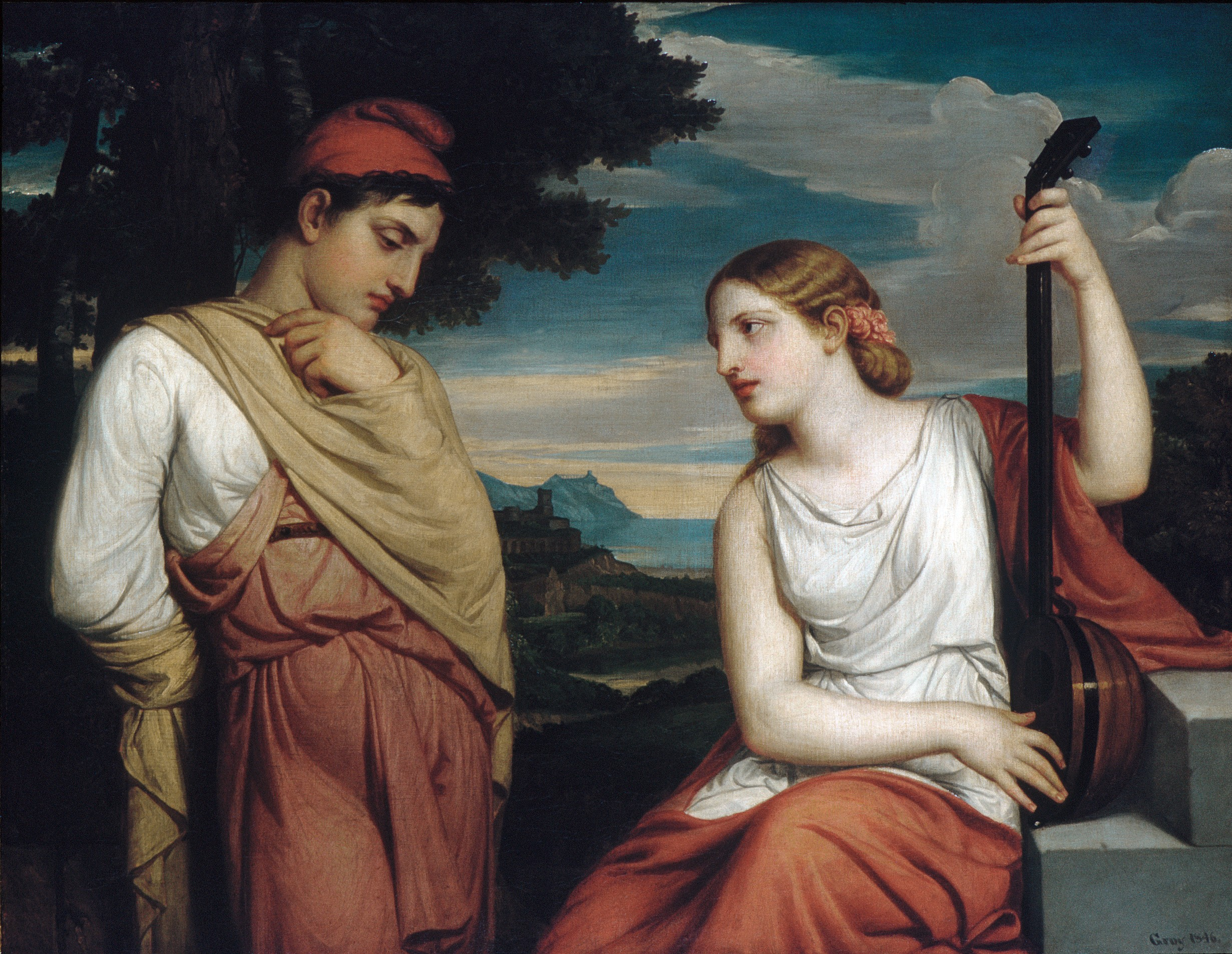
The Greek Lovers at the Metropolitan Museum of Art, 1846

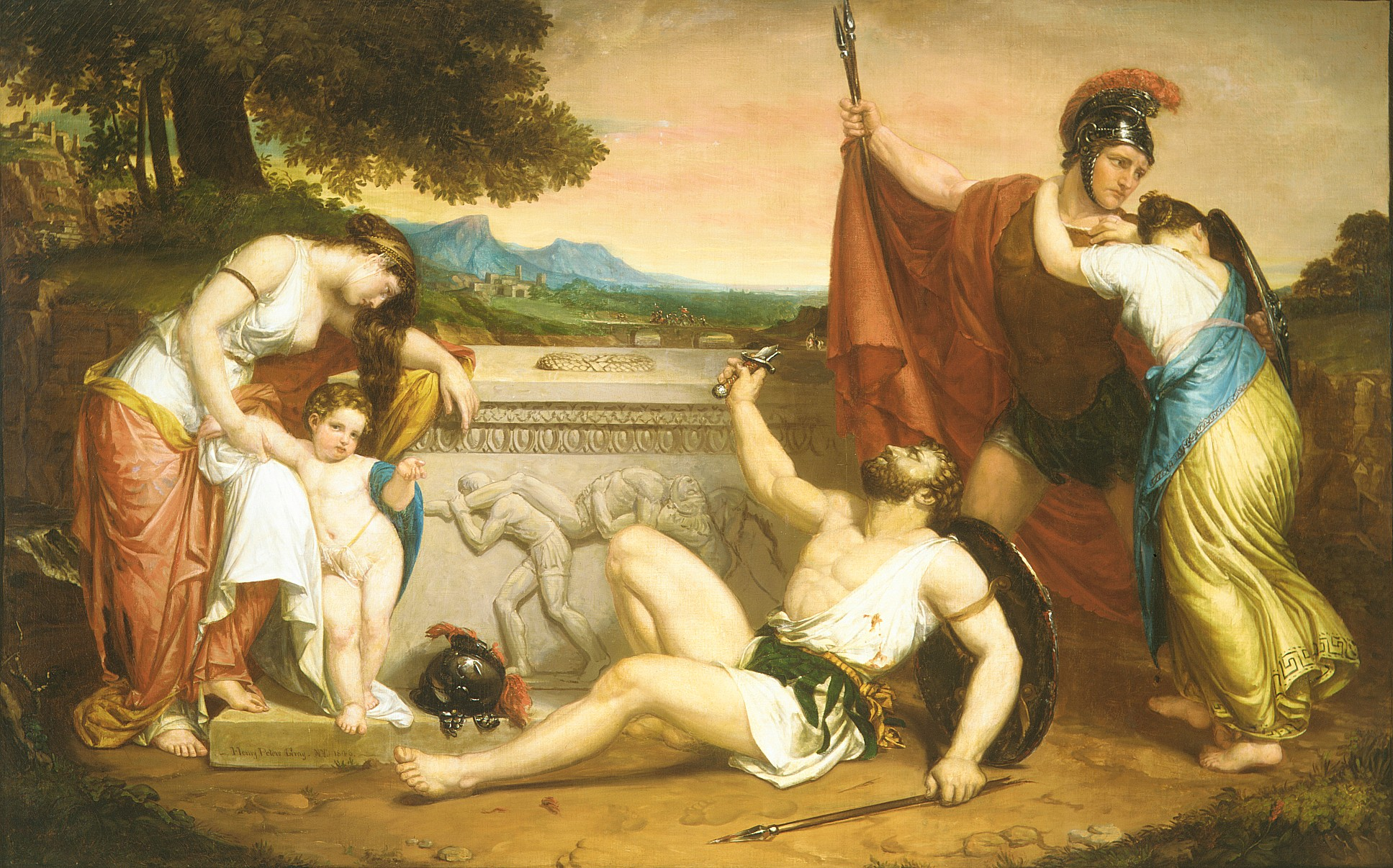
The Wages of War at the Metropolitan Museum of Art, 1848

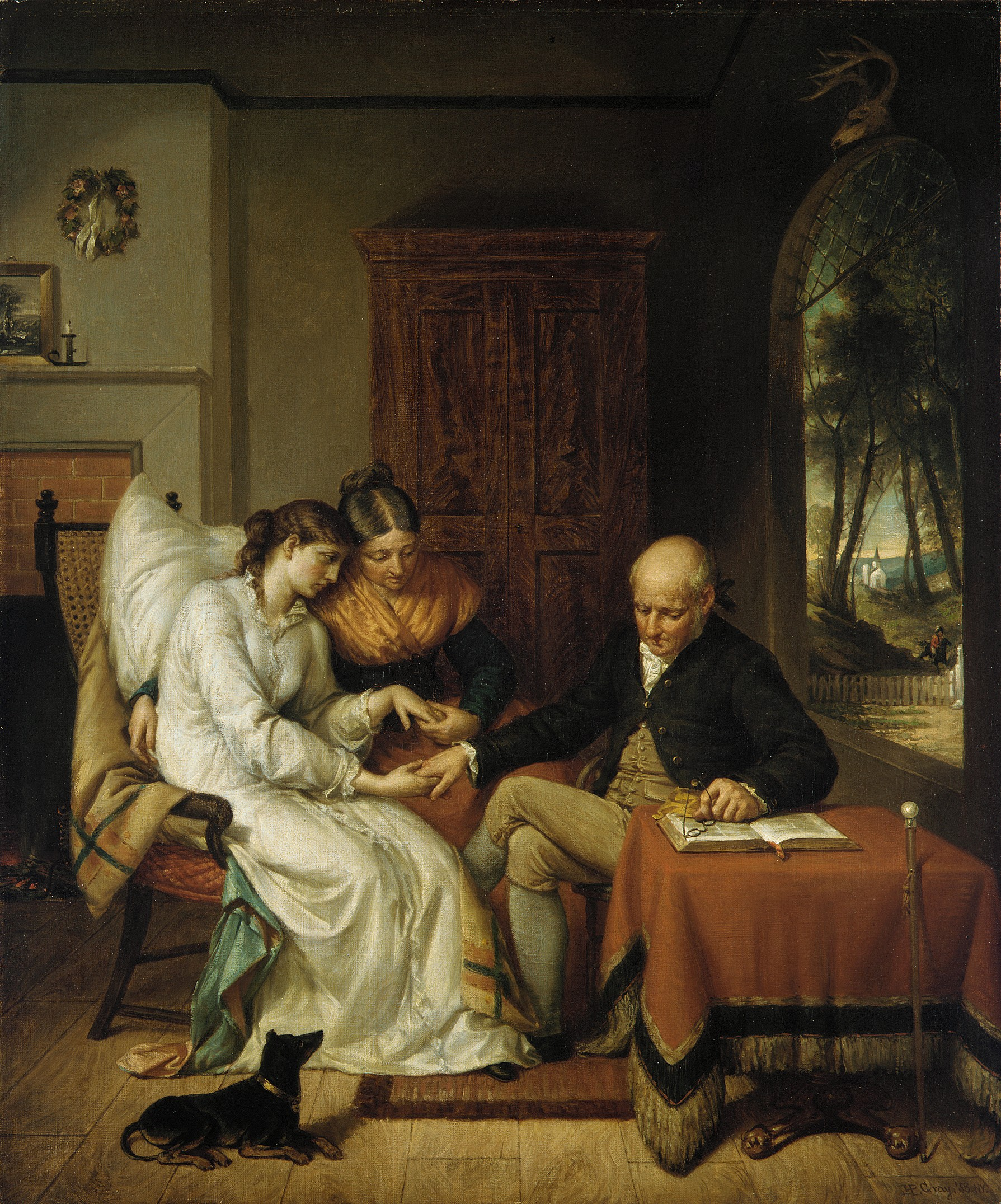
The Pride of the Village at the Metropolitan Museum of Art, 1858–59
