= College of Engineering (University of Wisconsin–Madison) =

Engineering school of the University of Wisconsin–Madison

Coordinates: 43°04′18.4″N 89°24′37.0″W

- Type: Public
- Established: 1857
- Dean: Devesh Ranjan
- Undergraduates: 4,500
- Postgraduates: 1,500
- Location: Madison, Wisconsin, United States
- Campus: Urban
- Website: engineering.wisc.edu

The College of Engineering (often referred to as COE) is the engineering school of the University of Wisconsin–Madison. The college comprises 8 academic departments. With an enrollment of 4,500 undergraduate and 1,500 graduate students, the College of Engineering is considered one of the best engineering schools in the United States. UW–Madison's graduate engineering program ranked 27th nationally in the 2023-2024 Best Engineering Schools ranking by U.S. News & World Report, while its undergraduate program ranked 13th.

The school dates back to 1857 when the first department of engineering was created by the university Board of Regents. It was not until 1868 when the first professor of engineering, Colonel W. R. Pease, was hired.

== Academic departments ==
- Biomedical Engineering (BME)
- Chemical and Biological Engineering (CBE)
- Civil and Environmental Engineering (CEE)
- Electrical and Computer Engineering (ECE)
- Nuclear Engineering and Engineering Physics (NEEP)
- Industrial and Systems Engineering (ISyE)
- Materials Science and Engineering (MS&E)
- Mechanical Engineering (ME)
