= MadFiber Ice Cream =

MadFiber Ice Cream is a designer ice cream created by UW-Madison's College of Agriculture and Life Sciences that features vanilla cream, mini M&M's, and granola.

The dessert was part of Madison, Wisconsin's effort to bring Google's $97 million high speed optical fiber network to Madison, WI. The ice cream gained recognition outside of Madison when the New York Times made note of it in an article "Hoping for Gift From Google? Go Jump in the Lake."

Proponents of the ice cream have included Mayor Dave Cieslewicz, Madison Schools Superintendent, Dan Nerad, and Dean of UW-Madison's College of Agriculture and Life Sciences, Irwin Goldman. Owners of technology start-ups in the community have also voiced support for the ice cream.

Some members of the Madison community, however, question the ice cream's utility in promoting the city's bid while others critique the move as corporate wooing where community investment would be more appropriate.

Google stopped formal receipt of information from cities interested in the project in March 2010. The company announced Kansas City, Kansas would receive the high speed fiber network. The University of Wisconsin-Madison has not yet stated an end date for production and distribution of MadFiber Ice Cream.
