= Madison Female Academy =

All-girls school in Madison, Wisconsin, U.S.

Coordinates: 43°04′35.3″N 89°23′13.0″W

- Madison, Wisconsin; United States

Information
- Gender: Girls

Madison Female Academy was a school for girls which flourished in the 19th century in Madison, Wisconsin, United States, and is now mainly famous as the site of the first classes held by the University of Wisconsin–Madison.

== Founding ==
The Madison Female Academy was founded in 1846 by Wisconsin investors. A prominent incorporator was John Catlin, an early pioneer of Madison, who served as the first president of Madison Female Academy. Prior to Madison Female Academy, Catlin, along with David Brigham, another pioneer of Madison, organized the Madison Select Female School in 1842. They appointed Maria M. Gay of Marietta, a highly qualified female educator from Marietta, Ohio, as preceptress. Madison Select Female School was forced to close after only one year due to struggles with both finance and enrolment. Efforts towards female education in Madison were renewed four years later with the incorporation of the Madison Female Academy. The Madison Female Academy was located within the Madison Women’s Seminary which was built in 1846. The Madison Women’s Seminary was also known as the Academy Building. Classes successfully ran from 1847 to 1854 when the school ended operations after seven years.

== Building Description ==
The Madison Female Academy was located within the Madison Women’s Seminary, a red brick building constructed specifically for the Academy. The Seminary was built in 1847 and was located on the corner of Wisconsin Avenue and East Johnson. The Academy Building held classes for Madison City High School from 1860 to 1873. The Academy Building was demolished in 1873 to make room for the present High School building.

== Closure ==
In 1848, Wisconsin achieved statehood, which followed with the development of Wisconsin’s publicly funded education system. The growth of public education in Wisconsin brought competition to many private schools such as the Madison Female Academy. State interest drew away from private institutions and favoured accessible, co-educational systems. Public education slowly succeeded the Academy until its closure in 1854. The grounds of the Madison Female Academy were sold to the City of Madison in 1858, marking the end of their use of the Academy Building.

== University of Wisconsin-Madison ==
The Madison Women's Seminary is historically known for holding the University of Wisconsin-Madison’s first ever classes. In 1849, leaders of the Madison Female Academy voted to allow the university to occupy the ground floor of the two story building at no cost. The first classes were run in the Academy building with about 20 students. University regents believed that graduates of Wisconsin's relatively new public school system were not prepared for university level work. To address this, they created a preparatory department run by John Sterling. Classes were located in the Madison Women's Seminary along with various locations around town including Sterling's home, hotel parlours, and law offices. In 1851, construction of the North Hall, University of Wisconsin-Madison’s first official building was completed. All classes were moved out of the Madison Women’s Seminary and into the North Hall.
