= Weinert Center =

The Weinert Center is the home of entrepreneurship education in the School of Business at the University of Wisconsin–Madison (UW). The center is dedicated to teaching, research, and service related to entrepreneurial management and enterprise development across the entire UW campus.

== History ==
Although the first entrepreneurship course was in 1982, the center was created in 1987. It was renamed in 1999 after James J. Weinert, an alumnus of the School of Business. For the past two decades, the University of Wisconsin–Madison has been involved in entrepreneurship education, outreach and research.

== Overview ==
The Weinert Center is a resource for students interested in entrepreneurship. Students take one or more courses in entrepreneurship and other related topics in preparation for roles as business owners and managers, venture capitalists, or consultants to smaller businesses. They are trained to innovate, launch and grow businesses and pursue entrepreneurial dreams.

The center supports UW undergraduate and graduate students, conducts research in the field of entrepreneurship, assists local business ventures via class projects, and contributes to public policy debate on issues related to entrepreneurship.

In 2010, the Weinert Center at the Wisconsin School of Business was named a top 25 program by Entrepreneur Magazine and the Princeton Review for both graduate and undergraduate entrepreneurial education. The Financial Times has also named it one of the top entrepreneurship programs in the world. The MBA program in Entrepreneurial Management was named the 2009 “National Model MBA Entrepreneurship Program” by the United States Association for Small Business and Entrepreneurship (USASBE), a national network of entrepreneurship educators, professional practitioners, researchers and government policy makers.

== Entrepreneurial management curriculum ==
Students individually tailor their programs by taking entrepreneurship electives from both the Wisconsin School of Business and across the UW campus.

== WAVE practicum ==
Many graduate students attend the capstone course Weinert Applied Ventures in Entrepreneurship (WAVE) which provides them with an applied practicum in starting and growing entrepreneurial businesses. The practicum involves a weekly seminar, hands-on work using lean start-up tools, and interaction with local and national experts on a variety of topics important to the education of budding entrepreneurs.

Students also use the WAVE program as a platform to launch their own ventures. The Weinert Ventures Funds is available to make equity investments in promising student start-ups.

=== WAVE Investment Fund ===
Students are eligible to apply for up to $100,000 in investment capital for their start-up businesses. This fund was made possible by an initial gift from James Weinert. Bruce D. Neviaser donated significantly to this investment fund in honor of his father, Daniel H. Neviaser, a prominent Madison civic leader and WAVE advisor.

== Student organizations ==
Weinert Center students are involved with many student organizations campus-wide including:

- University of Wisconsin Entrepreneur Association
- Net Impact
- Students in Free Enterprise (SIFE)
- MBA Global Business Program

== Student competitions ==
Students have received support from the center and had success in the following competitions:

- UW Business Plan Competition
- Moot Business Plan Competition
- Wisconsin Governor's Business Plan Competition
- Elevator Pitch Olympics at the Wisconsin Early Stage Symposium
