= UW Hybrid Vehicle Team =

The Wisconsin Hybrid Vehicle Team consists mainly of undergraduate students from the University of Wisconsin–Madison who work together to build a hybrid electric vehicle.

== The Team ==
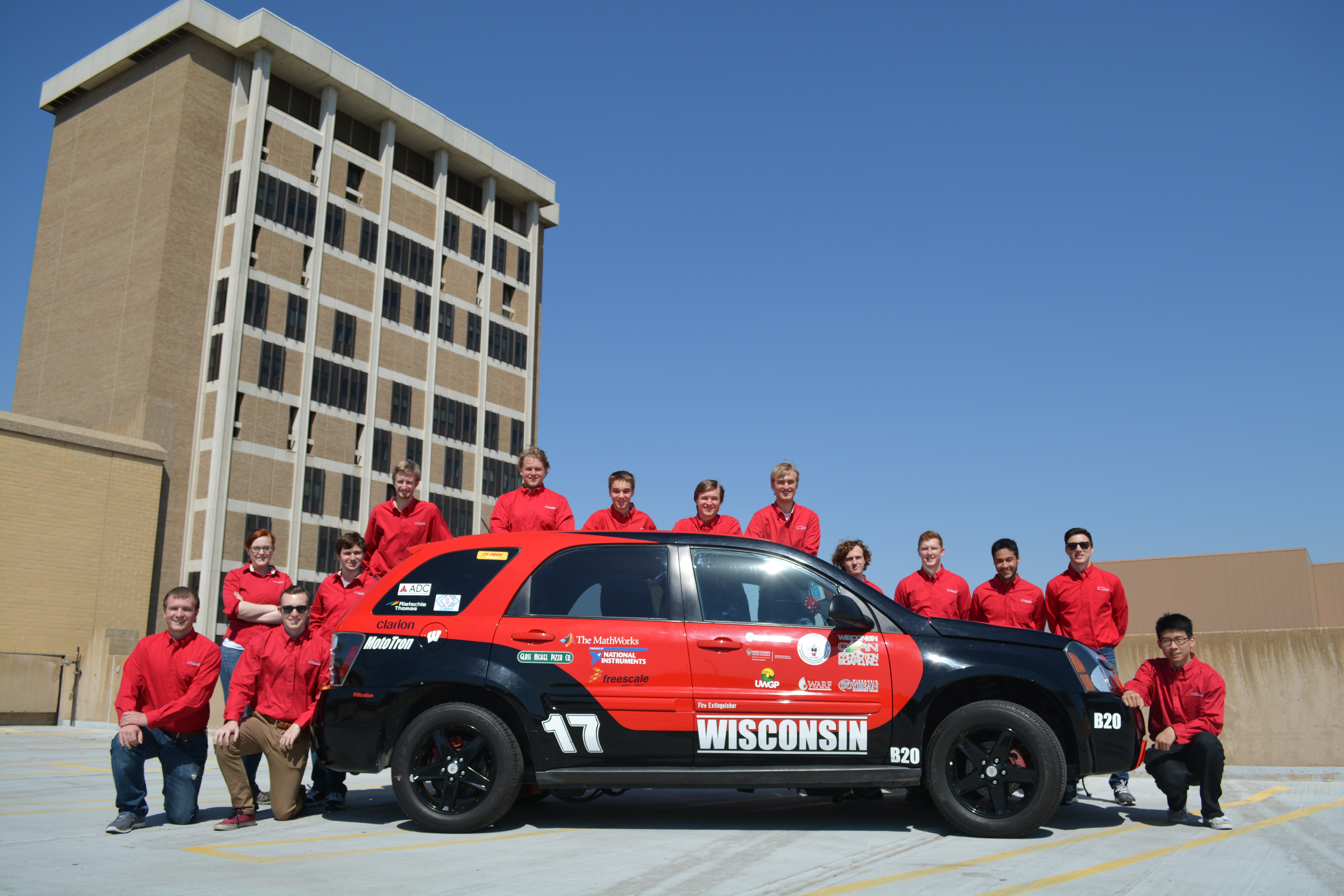
The Hybrid Vehicle Team at the University of Wisconsin-Madison, spring 2016

Many of the members have little to no previous automotive experience. New team members are taught alongside veteran student members. This passing of knowledge ensures a legacy that is carried on to younger generations.

The team is subdivided into five major groups to handle necessary tasks. The Mechanical and Drivetrain groups work to design and implement new components, renovate old parts, and perform general vehicle maintenance.

The Control and Electrical Groups are responsible for maintaining all of the vehicle computer and electrical components; this includes developing a complex control strategy and programing the electronic control unit, rewiring the vehicle to accommodate the hybrid systems, and maintaining the battery pack as well as other electrically sensitive components.

The Outreach group is responsible for publishing newsletters, maintaining the website, obtaining positive relationships with local businesses and the community, and involving the team in community events.

Each group is led by a veteran team member who meets to coordinate projects and make decisions for the vehicle's progress. Each leader is responsible to teach each of the group's attendants safely.

== Past Competitions ==
Years	Competition	Vehicle Name	Original Vehicle	Architecture	Place Attained	More Information
1992–1994	HEV Challenge	Electric Cow	Ford Escort Wagon	Series		Here
1995–1996	FutureCar	Future Cow	Dodge Intrepid	Parallel	3rd in '95	Here
1998–1999	FutureCar	Aluminum Cow	Mercury Sable	Parallel	1st Overall	Here
2000–2001	FutureTruck	Moollennium	Chevrolet Suburban	Parallel Hybrid (B20)	4th in '00; 2nd in '01	Here
2002–2004	FutureTruck	Moolander	Ford Explorer	Parallel Hybrid (B35)	1st in '02-'04!	Here
2005–2008	Challenge X	Moovada	Chevrolet Equinox	Parallel Hybrid (B20)	2nd Overall	Here
2008–2010	EcoCar	eMoove	Saturn Vue	Powersplit Hybrid (E85)	UWHVT Homepage	

== Current Competition ==
The EcoCar Challenge is a three-year competition sponsored by the U.S. DOE, GM, and Argonne National Labs for 2008-2010. Seventeen universities from the US and Canada were selected to participate. In the first year, teams concentrated on designing, modeling, and simulating their teams proposed vehicle architecture. Additionally, teams worked to create a functional HIL (hardware-in-the-loop) to demonstrate their capability to manage a vehicle's ECU. The first year's competition was completed in June 2009 in Toronto, OH Canada.

In the first year of the competition, the UWHVT developed an architecture that was a powersplit hybrid design. Technical papers were created at intervals throughout the year dictating decisions and results of simulations. It consists of a prototype traction motor, the 150 kW Continental AG Sapphire drive. A Weber MPE 750 engine (operating on E85) and the Delphi DU174 motor (found in the EV1) complete the genset. A clutch implemented in between the DU174 and the Weber allow for efficient all electric drive, while a clutch implemented in between the DU174 and the rear differential allows the Weber engine to be directly coupled to the road at highway speeds. Lastly, the battery pack located in the spare rear wheel compartment will be a Johnson Controls Saft 41Ah lithium-ion pack.

The UWHVT expects to receive its stock Saturn Vue in August 2009 and proceed building the vehicle in year 2. Competition for year two of the challenge will be in Yuma, AZ at GM's new proving ground.
