= Catherine Lubetzki =

French neurologist and academic

- Education: Pierre and Marie Curie University; Paris Descartes University
- Scientific career
- Workplaces: Pierre and Marie Curie University; Pitié-Salpêtrière Hospital; Collège de France
- Thesis: Isolement et culture d'oligodendrocytes : contribution à l'étude des maladies démyélinisantes humaines

Catherine Lubetzki is a French neurologist who is a professor at Sorbonne University. She is head of the Department of Neurological Diseases at the Pitié-Salpêtrière Hospital, where she coordinates the Salpêtrière Multiple Sclerosis clinical research centre. Her research involves the physiology of multiple sclerosis, and identifying the interactions between myelin and axons. In 2019, she was awarded the Multiple Sclerosis International Federation Charcot Award.

== Early life and education ==
Lubetzki completed her medical training at the Paris Descartes University. She became interested in neurology after a selection process left her the last member of the year group to choose a rotation. She ended up in a neurosurgery rotation, and completed a year in research at the Collège de France. She worked alongside Jacques Glowinski on neuropharmacology and first interacted with people with multiple sclerosis, realising that they were not receiving appropriate medical care. She worked as a clinical researcher identifying new immunotherapies for multiple sclerosis. She completed her doctoral research at the Pierre and Marie Curie University, where she worked on myelin and myelin-forming cells.

== Research and career ==
In 1996, Lubetzki was the first to demonstrate the role of electrical activity in the induction of myelination. Experimentally, she showed that myelination could be inhibited by blocking the action potential of neighbouring axons (and vice versa). She went on to develop this research, and, concentrating on the Node of Ranvier, demonstrated conduction velocity increases with myelination. Her identification that the rate and efficacy of oligodendrocyte progenitor cells are critical in myelination could help to identify new repair strategies. Using in vitro screening, Lubetzki has developed pro-myelinating therapeutic candidates, and is testing the impact of electrical stimulation at the Paris Brain Institute.

Lubetzki served as President of the Scientific Committee for the French Multiple Sclerosis Research Association. In 2019, she was the first woman to be awarded the Multiple Sclerosis International Federation Charcot Award.

== Awards and honours ==
- 2008 Grand Prix scientifique de la Fondation NRJ
- 2010 Sobeck Award
- 2015 Foundation pour la Recherche Medicale Camille Woringer Award
- 2019 Multiple Sclerosis International Federation Charcot Award
- 2021 Pasteur-Weizmann/Servier Prize

== Selected publications ==
- Corinne de Chappedelaine; B Stankoff; M Logak; P Anglade; B Allinquant; F Couraud; B Zalc; C Lubetzki (1 September 1996). "Induction of myelination in the central nervous system by electrical activity". Proceedings of the National Academy of Sciences of the United States of America. 93 (18): 9887–9892. Bibcode:1996PNAS...93.9887D. doi:10.1073/pnas.93.18.9887. ISSN 0027-8424. PMC 38524. PMID 8790426. Wikidata Q30453890.
- Xavier Montalban; Ralf Gold; Alan J. Thompson; et al. (1 January 2018). "ECTRIMS/EAN Guideline on the pharmacological treatment of people with multiple sclerosis". Multiple Sclerosis Journal. 24 (2): 96–120. doi:10.1177/1352458517751049. ISSN 1352-4585. PMID 29353550. Wikidata Q47849889. (erratum)
- Christel Renoux; Sandra Vukusic; Christian Confavreux (4 June 2008). "The natural history of multiple sclerosis with childhood onset". Clinical Neurology and Neurosurgery. 110 (9): 897–904. doi:10.1016/j.clineuro.2008.04.009. ISSN 0303-8467. PMID 18534742. Wikidata Q37183765.
