= Fazekas =

Fazekas is a Hungarian language surname meaning potter. Notable people with the surname include:

- Ferenc Fazekas (born 1958), Serbian Roman Catholic prelate
- Franz Fazekas (born 1956), Austrian neurologist
- István Fazekas (1898–1967), Hungarian–British chess master
- Krisztina Fazekas (born 1980), Hungarian sprint canoeist who has competed since the mid-2000s
- László Fazekas (1947–2026), Hungarian football player and manager
- Mária Fazekas (born 1975), Hungarian table tennis player
- Mihály Fazekas (1766–1828), Hungarian writer from Debrecen
- Miklós Fazekas (1933–2025), Hungarian steeplechase runner
- Nándor Fazekas (born 1976), Hungarian handball goalkeeper
- Nick Fazekas (born 1985), American professional basketball player
- Róbert Fazekas (born 1975), Hungarian discus thrower who won gold in the 2002 European Championships
- Sándor Fazekas (born 1963), Hungarian jurist and politician
- Stephen Fazekas de St. Groth (1919–2006), Hungarian-Australia microbiologist
- Tibor Fazekas (1892–1982), Hungarian water polo player who competed in the 1912 and 1924 Summer Olympics
- Isabella Fazekas Jacobsen (born 1997), Danish handball player

== See also ==
- Fazekas Hills
- Fazekas Mihály Gimnázium (Budapest), a high school in Budapest, Hungary
- Fazekas Mihály Gimnázium (Debrecen) a high school in Debrecen, Hungary
- Miklós Bogáthi Fazekas (1548–1592), Transylvanian Unitarian and Sabbatarian
- Fazakas, a Hungarian surname
