= Fazakas =

Fazakas is a Hungarian surname. Notable people with the surname include:

- Faz Fazakas (1918–2013), American puppeteer, engineer, and special effects designer of Hungarian descent
- Géza Fazakas (born 1990), Hungarian football player
- LaTiesha Fazakas (born 1971), Canadian curator, filmmaker, and art dealer
- Szabolcs Fazakas (1947–2020), Hungarian politician and diplomat

== See also ==
- Fazekas, a Hungarian surname
- Miklós Bogáthi Fazekas (also Bogáthi Fazakas; 1548–1592), Transylvanian Unitarian and Sabbatarian
