= Albrecht Kossel Institute for Neuroregeneration =

Research hospital in Rostock, Germany

Geography
- Location: Rostock, Germany

The Albrecht Kossel Institute for Neuroregeneration is a medical research hospital located in Rostock, Germany. It was formed from the neurobiological laboratory of the hospital for neurology at the University of Rostock, and it operates under the auspices of The University Clinic of Rostock.

The institute conducts research into rare congenital metabolic illnesses such as Fabry's disease and Gaucher's disease. It enjoys worldwide recognition as a diagnostic and treatment center for rare illnesses. Its stated area of research is neuroregeneration, the regrowth or repair of nervous tissues and cells.

The institute is named for Albrecht Kossel, noted German biochemist, 1910 Nobel laureate in Physiology or Medicine, and graduate of the university.

== Sifap ==
In 2007, the Institute initiated Sifap, a Pan-European study dedicated to investigating the correlation of juvenile stroke and a genetic disorder known as Fabry's disease. The institute will engage in professional cooperation with international partners in the fields of economics, science and research. The expected results are an improved understanding into the nature of juvenile stroke, and improvement in its therapeutic treatment.

== Education and research ==
The institute works in close cooperation with national and international universities in the context of scientific cooperatives. The institute participates in LEUKONET, the German Leukodystrophy network, which is run by the German Federal Ministry of Education and Research.

The Institute participates in and promotes the EuroStemCell project, an initiative of the Framework Programmes for Research and Technological Development by the European Commission. In 2008, it hosted the 5th International Stem Cell School in Regenerative Medicine, an international academic conference.

The institute also participates in the Graduiertenkolleg, a means of providing advanced training to medical researchers.

The institute is one of only a few medical facilities in Germany that is authorized by the government to conduct human embryonic stem cell research.

== See also ==
- University of Rostock
- Sifap
