= Stephen Moulton Babcock =

American agricultural chemist

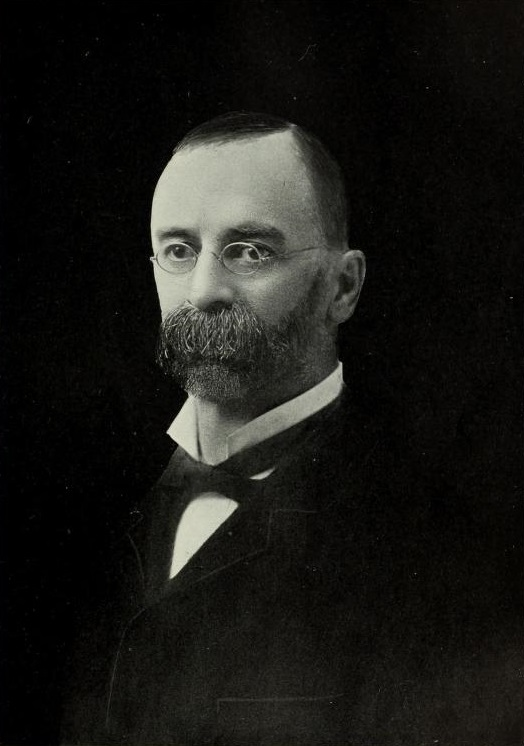
- Babcock in 1903
- Born: 22 October 1843; Oneida County, New York
- Died: 2 July 1931 (aged 87); Madison, Wisconsin
- Education: Tufts College (B.S., 1866); Cornell University; University of Göttingen (Ph.D., 1879)
- Known for: the Babcock test for butterfat
- Scientific career
- Fields: agronomy chemistry
- Workplaces: New York Agricultural Experiment Station; University of Wisconsin–Madison
- Doctoral advisor: Hans Hübner

Stephen Moulton Babcock (22 October 1843 – 2 July 1931) was an American agricultural chemist. He is best known for developing the Babcock test, used to determine butterfat content in milk and cheese processing, and for the single-grain experiment that led to the development of nutritional science as a recognized discipline.

== Early life and career ==
Babcock was born on a farm in Bridgewater, New York to Peleg and Cornelia Babcock. He earned a B.A. from Tufts College in 1866 and attended Cornell University from 1872 to 1875, before studying organic chemistry at the University of Göttingen, Germany, from which he received a Ph.D. in 1879. Upon his return to the United States in 1881, Babcock took up the role of an agricultural chemist at the New York State Agricultural Experiment Station in Geneva, New York, where his first assignment was to determine the proper feed ratios of carbohydrate, fat, and protein using chemical analysis of cow excrement. He determined that the excrement's chemical composition was similar to that of the feed, the only major exception being the ash content. These results were tested and retested, and his results were similar to German studies done earlier. This led Babcock to wonder what would happen if cattle were fed a single grain (barley, corn, or wheat), though that test would not be carried out for nearly twenty-five years.

== University of Wisconsin–Madison ==
In 1888, Babcock accepted a position at the University of Wisconsin–Madison Agricultural Experiment Station (UWAES) as chair of the agricultural chemistry department. He immediately petitioned Dean of Agriculture William Henry, then station director, to carry out the "single-grain experiment", but Henry refused. In 1890, he developed the Babcock test which determines the butterfat content of milk. He then worked with bacteriologist Harry Luman Russell in developing the cold-curing process for ripening cheese (1897). The Babcock test set the worldwide standard for butterfat determination of milk, while the cold-curing process enabled Wisconsin to become the leading cheese producer in the United States.

== "Single-grain experiment" ==
Babcock continued pressing William Henry to perform the "single-grain experiment" and even unsuccessfully approached the UWAES animal husbandry chair J. A. Craig. Craig was replaced in 1897 by W. L. Carlyle, who was more receptive to Babcock's proposal. He initially tried a salt experiment with eight dairy cows as a matter of taste preference, while eight other cows received no salt. After one of the eight cows that did not receive salt died, Carlyle discontinued the experiment, and all of the remaining cows were given salt in order to restore their health.

William Henry, who became dean of agriculture in 1901, finally gave Babcock permission to perform the single-grain experiment. Carlyle approved the experiment with only two cows. One cow was fed corn, while the other was fed rolled oats and straw with the expectation that the experiment would last one year. Three months into the trial, the oat-fed cow died, and Carlyle halted the experiment to save the other cow's life. The result was not published, mainly because Babcock had not recorded how much of each grain the cows had consumed.

In 1906, a chemist from the University of Michigan, Edwin B. Hart (1874-1953), was hired by Babcock. Hart had previously worked at the New York State Agricultural Experiment Station and had studied physiological chemistry under Albrecht Kossel in Germany. Both worked with George C. Humphrey, who replaced Carlyle as animal husbandry professor, to plan a long-term feeding plan using a chemically balanced diet of carbohydrates, fat, and protein instead of single-plant rations as had been tried in Babcock's earlier experiment. The "single-grain experiment" was thus born in 1907.

From May 1907 to 1911, the experiment was carried out with Hart as director, Babcock providing the ideas, and Humphrey overseeing the welfare of the cows during the experiment. Elmer McCollum, an organic chemist from Connecticut, was hired by Hart to analyze the grain rations and the cow excrement. The experiment called for four groups of four heifer calves each, and three groups were raised and two pregnancies were carried to term during the experiment. The first group ate only wheat, the second group ate only bran, the third group ate only corn, and the last group ate a mixture of the other three.

In 1908, it was shown that the corn-fed animals were the most healthy of the group, while the wheat-fed groups were the least healthy. All four groups bred during that year, with the corn-fed calves being the healthiest, while the wheat and mixed-fed calves were stillborn or later died. Similar results were found in 1909. In 1910, the corn-fed cows had their diets switched to wheat and the non-corn-fed cows were fed corn. This produced unhealthy calves for the formerly corn-fed cows while the remaining cows produced healthy calves. When the 1909 formulas were reintroduced to the respective cows in 1911, the gestation results of 1909 reoccurred. These results were published in 1911. Similar results had been determined in the Dutch East Indies (now Indonesia) in 1901, in Poland in 1910, and in England in 1906 (though the English results were not published until 1912).

This experiment helped the development of nutrition as a science.

== Legacy ==
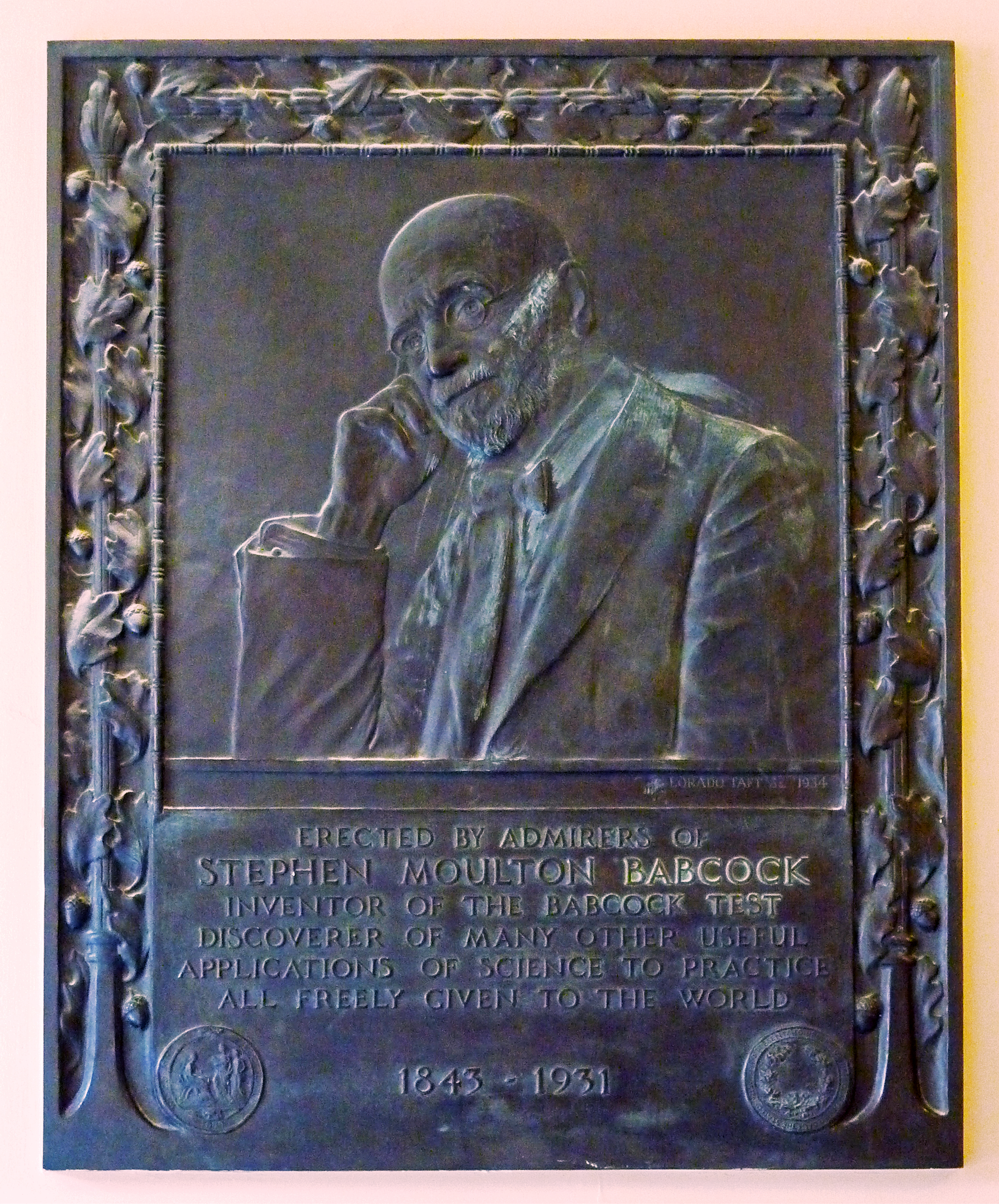
Memorial plaque (1934) by Lorado Taft

Babcock died in 1931, in Madison, Wisconsin, from a heart attack suffered during a heat wave. His estate was left to the University of Wisconsin–Madison College of Agriculture. By a decision of the deans, a housing cooperative for male students studying agriculture was established in the Babcock home and named in his honor. Babcock House is the oldest continuously operating student housing cooperative in Wisconsin and is now open to male and female students of any course of study. Currently, the alumni board treasurer is Alex Held.

In World War II, the United States Liberty ship SS S. M. Babcock was named in his honor.

In 1948, the Institute of Food Technologists created the Stephen M. Babcock Award (now the Babcock-Hart Award) in honor of Babcock's achievements. Additionally, the Food Science Department building at the University of Wisconsin in Madison was named in Babcock's honor in 1952. The Institute of International Dairy Research and Development at Wisconsin was also named in Babcock's honor.
