= Single-grain =

Single-grain or single grain may refer to:

- Single-grain experiment, an experiment carried out at the University of Wisconsin–Madison from May 1907 to 1911
- Single-grain wheat, a diploid species of hulled wheat
- Single grain whisky, a whisky produced at a single distillery using some grains other than barley
