= Biochemistry =

Study of chemical processes of living organisms

Biochemistry, or biological chemistry (distinct from chemical biology), is the study of chemical processes within and relating to living organisms. A sub-discipline of both chemistry and biology, biochemistry may be divided into three fields: structural biology, enzymology, and metabolism. Over the last decades of the 20th century, biochemistry has become successful at explaining living processes through these three disciplines. Almost all areas of the life sciences are being uncovered and developed through biochemical methodology and research.

Biochemistry focuses on understanding the chemical basis that allows biological molecules to give rise to the processes that occur within living cells and between cells, in turn relating greatly to the understanding of tissues and organs as well as organism structure and function. Biochemistry is closely related to molecular biology, the study of the molecular mechanisms of biological phenomena.

Much of biochemistry deals with the structures, functions, and interactions of biological macromolecules such as proteins, nucleic acids, carbohydrates, and lipids. They provide the structure of cells and perform many of the functions associated with life. The chemistry of the cell also depends upon the reactions of small molecules and ions. These can be inorganic (for example, water and metal ions) or organic (for example, the amino acids, which are used to synthesize proteins). The mechanisms used by cells to harness energy from their environment via chemical reactions are known as metabolism.

The findings of biochemistry are applied primarily in medicine, nutrition, and agriculture. In medicine, biochemists investigate the causes and cures of diseases. Nutrition studies how to maintain health and wellness and also the effects of nutritional deficiencies. In agriculture, biochemists investigate soil and fertilizers with the goal of improving crop cultivation, crop storage, and pest control. In recent decades, biochemical principles and methods have been combined with problem-solving approaches from engineering to manipulate living systems in order to produce useful tools for research, industrial processes, and diagnosis and control of disease—the discipline of biotechnology.

== History ==
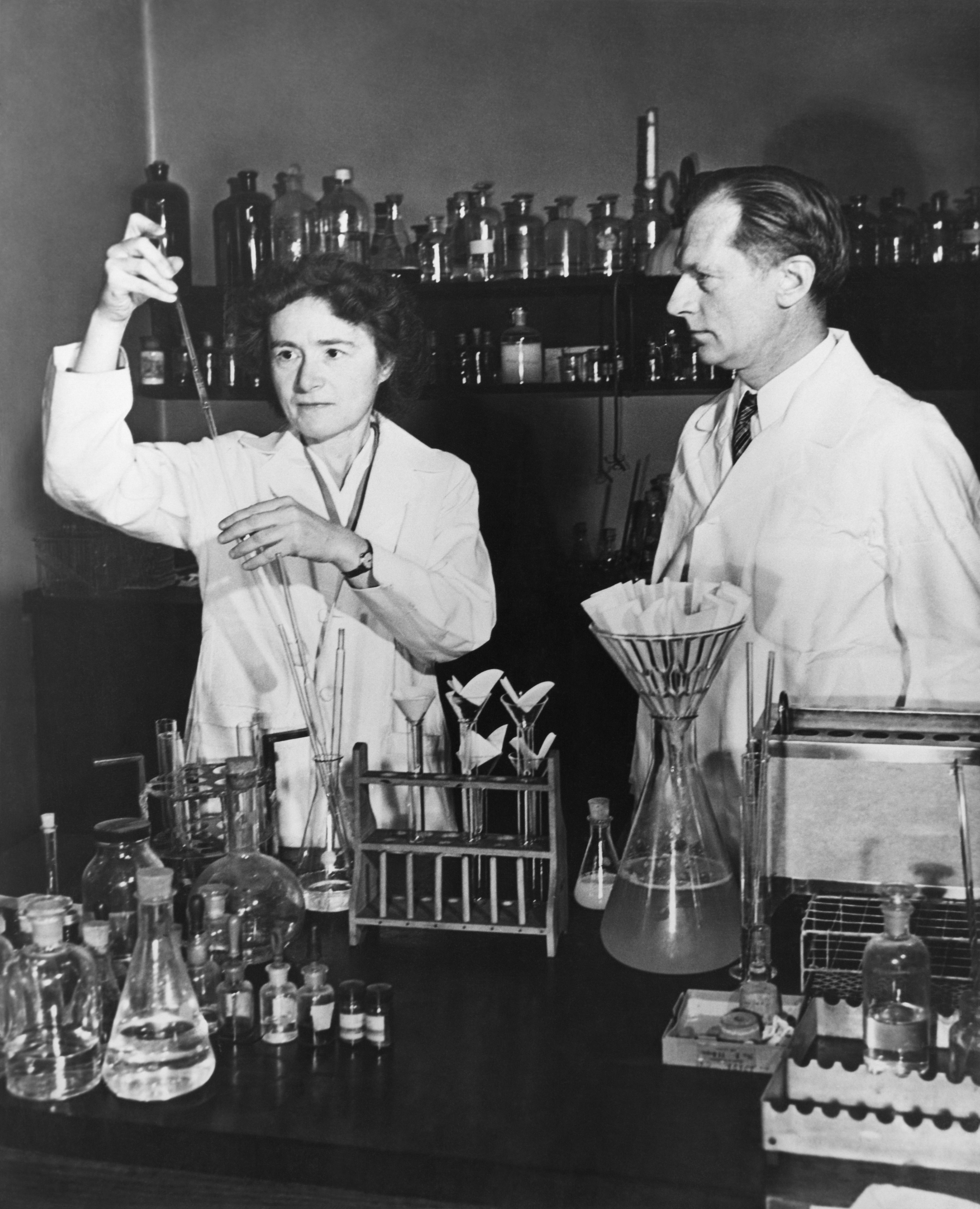
Gerty Cori and Carl Cori jointly won the Nobel Prize in 1947 for their discovery of the Cori cycle at RPMI.

At its most comprehensive definition, biochemistry can be seen as a study of the components and composition of living things and how they come together to become life. In this sense, the history of biochemistry may therefore go back as far as the ancient Greeks. However, biochemistry as a specific scientific discipline began sometime in the 19th century, or a little earlier, depending on which aspect of biochemistry is being focused on. Some argued that the beginning of biochemistry may have been the discovery of the first enzyme, diastase (now called amylase), in 1833 by Anselme Payen, while others considered Eduard Buchner's first demonstration of a complex biochemical process alcoholic fermentation in cell-free extracts in 1897 to be the birth of biochemistry. Some might also point as its beginning to the influential 1842 work by Justus von Liebig, Animal chemistry, or, Organic chemistry in its applications to physiology and pathology, which presented a chemical theory of metabolism, or even earlier to the 18th century studies on fermentation and respiration by Antoine Lavoisier. Many other pioneers in the field who helped to uncover the layers of complexity of biochemistry have been proclaimed founders of modern biochemistry. Emil Fischer, who studied the chemistry of proteins, and F. Gowland Hopkins, who studied enzymes and the dynamic nature of biochemistry, represent two examples of early biochemists.

The term "biochemistry" was first used when Vinzenz Kletzinsky (1826–1882) had his "Compendium der Biochemie" printed in Vienna in 1858; it derived from a combination of biology and chemistry. In 1877, Felix Hoppe-Seyler used the term (biochemie in German) as a synonym for physiological chemistry in the foreword to the first issue of Zeitschrift für Physiologische Chemie (Journal of Physiological Chemistry) where he argued for the setting up of institutes dedicated to this field of study. The German chemist Carl Neuberg however is often cited to have coined the word in 1903, while some credited it to Franz Hofmeister.

DNA structure (1D65)

It was once generally believed that life and its materials had some essential property or substance (often referred to as the "vital principle") distinct from any found in non-living matter, and it was thought that only living beings could produce the molecules of life. In 1828, Friedrich Wöhler published a paper on his serendipitous urea synthesis from potassium cyanate and ammonium sulfate; some regarded that as a direct overthrow of vitalism and the establishment of organic chemistry. However, the Wöhler synthesis has sparked controversy as some reject the death of vitalism at his hands. Since then, biochemistry has advanced, especially since the mid-20th century, with the development of new techniques such as chromatography, X-ray diffraction, dual polarisation interferometry, NMR spectroscopy, radioisotopic labeling, electron microscopy and molecular dynamics simulations. These techniques allowed for the discovery and detailed analysis of many molecules and metabolic pathways of the cell, such as glycolysis and the Krebs cycle (citric acid cycle), and led to an understanding of biochemistry on a molecular level.

Another significant historic event in biochemistry is the discovery of the gene, and its role in the transfer of information in the cell. In the 1950s, James D. Watson, Francis Crick, Rosalind Franklin and Maurice Wilkins were instrumental in solving DNA structure and suggesting its relationship with the genetic transfer of information. In 1958, George Beadle and Edward Tatum received the Nobel Prize for work in fungi showing that one gene produces one enzyme. In 1988, Colin Pitchfork was the first person convicted of murder with DNA evidence, which led to the growth of forensic science. More recently, Andrew Z. Fire and Craig C. Mello received the 2006 Nobel Prize for discovering the role of RNA interference (RNAi) in the silencing of gene expression.

== The chemical elements of life ==
The main elements that compose the human body shown from most abundant (by mass) to least abundant

Around two dozen chemical elements are essential to various kinds of biological life. Most rare elements on Earth are not needed by life (exceptions being selenium and iodine), while a few common ones (aluminium and titanium) are not used. Most organisms share elemental needs, but there are a few differences between plants and animals. For example, marine algae use bromine, and land animals incorporate ionic bromide in their connective tissue, but it is non-essential for land plants and can even be problematic at high quantities. All animals require sodium, but it is only an essential element for a small subset of plants, although many others do grow better in its presence. Plants need boron and silicon, but animals may not (or may need ultra-small amounts).

Biomolecules are constructed from just six bulk macronutrients, abbreviated CHNOPS (carbon, hydrogen, nitrogen, oxygen, phosphorus, and sulfur), and these six make up >99% of the mass of all of our cells. Humans further require significant quantities of four key ions (magnesium, potassium, sodium, and calcium) and smaller amounts of some other elements and ions, termed micronutrients. In addition to the six major elements that compose most of the human body, humans require smaller amounts of possibly 18 more.

== Biomolecules ==
The four main classes of molecules in biochemistry (often called biomolecules) are carbohydrates, lipids, proteins, and nucleic acids. Many biological molecules are polymers: chains of smaller repeating units called monomers. When monomers are linked together to synthesize a biological polymer, they undergo a process called dehydration synthesis. Macromolecules can assemble in larger complexes with other molecules of the same or different type, often required for biological activity.

=== Carbohydrates ===
Carbohydrates

Glucose, a monosaccharide

A molecule of sucrose (glucose + fructose), a disaccharide

Amylose, a polysaccharide made up of several thousand glucose units

Two of the main functions of carbohydrates are energy storage and providing structure. The term 'sugar' typically refers to mono- and disaccharides (defined below), which fall into the former category and taste sweet. There are more carbohydrates on Earth than any other known type of biomolecule; they are used to store energy and genetic information, as well as play important roles in cell to cell interactions and communications. Carbohydrates can be represented by the stoichiometric formula (CH_{2}O)n, where n is the number of carbons in the molecule.Thus, they generally have a ratio of carbon to hydrogen to oxygen is 1:2:1 in carbohydrate molecules. This formula also explains the origin of the term “carbohydrate”: the components are carbon (“carbo”) and the components of water (hence, “hydrate”) .

The simplest type of carbohydrate is a monosaccharide, which have the chemical formula C_{6}H_{12}O_{6} but vary in their precise structures_{.} Glucose, fructose, and galactose are hexoses, i.e. 6-carbon sugar, sharing the formula C_{6}H_{12}O_{6}, but varying in precise structure. A well-known pentose, or 5-carbon sugar, is deoxyribose (C_{5}H_{10}O_{4}), a component of DNA. A monosaccharide can switch between acyclic (open-chain) form and cyclic form. This occurs through reaction of one of the hydroxyl groups with the carbonyl group on the end of the linear form, bridging them with an oxygen atom and releasing a water molecule in the process. The cyclic molecule has a hemiacetal or hemiketal group, depending on whether the linear form was an aldose or a ketose, which describe the position of the carbonyl group to begin with.

In these cyclic forms, the ring usually has 5 or 6 atoms. These forms are called furanoses and pyranoses, respectively—by analogy with furan and pyran, the simplest compounds with the same carbon-oxygen ring (although they lack the carbon-carbon double bonds of these two molecules). For example, the aldohexose glucose may form a hemiacetal linkage between the hydroxyl on carbon 1 and the oxygen on carbon 4, yielding a molecule with a 5-membered ring, called glucofuranose. The same reaction can take place between carbons 1 and 5 to form a molecule with a 6-membered ring, called glucopyranose. Notice that this means that pentoses/furanoses, and hexoses/pyranoses, are not interchangeable pairs: the number of carbons in the molecule can be different from the number of atoms in the ring, as not all carbons are necessarily included in the ring backbone.

Two monosaccharides can be joined by a glycosidic or ester bond into a disaccharide through a dehydration reaction during which a molecule of water is released. The reverse reaction in which the glycosidic bond of a disaccharide is broken into two monosaccharides is termed hydrolysis. The best-known disaccharide is sucrose or ordinary sugar, which consists of a glucose molecule and a fructose molecule joined. Another important disaccharide is lactose, found in milk, consisting of a glucose molecule and a galactose molecule. Lactose may be hydrolysed by lactase, and deficiency in this enzyme results in lactose intolerance.

When a few monosaccharides are joined, it is called an oligosaccharide (oligo- meaning "few" in Greek). Oligosaccharides are slightly larger than monosaccharides, comprising 3-10 monosaccharide units. These molecules tend to be used as markers and signals, as well as having some other uses.They often play roles in cell recognition and cell-to-cell adhesion. When larger groups are joined, this is called a polysaccharide. They can be joined in one long linear chain, or they may be branched. Two of the most common polysaccharides are cellulose and glycogen, both consisting of repeating glucose monomers. Cellulose is an important structural component of plant's cell walls and glycogen is used as a form of energy storage in animals. The energy storage polysaccharide in plants is called starch.

Sugar can be characterized by having reducing or non-reducing ends. A reducing end of a carbohydrate is a carbon atom that can be in equilibrium with the open-chain aldehyde (aldose) or keto form (ketose). If the joining of monomers takes place at such a carbon atom, the free hydroxy group of the pyranose or furanose form is exchanged with an OH-side-chain of another sugar, yielding a full acetal. This prevents opening of the chain to the aldehyde or keto form and renders the modified residue non-reducing. Lactose contains a reducing end at its glucose moiety, whereas the galactose moiety forms a full acetal with the C4-OH group of glucose. Saccharose does not have a reducing end because of full acetal formation between the aldehyde carbon of glucose (C1) and the keto carbon of fructose (C2).

=== Lipids ===
Structures of some common lipids. At the top are cholesterol and oleic acid. The middle structure is a triglyceride composed of oleoyl, stearoyl, and palmitoyl chains attached to a glycerol backbone. At the bottom is the common phospholipid, phosphatidylcholine.

Lipids are a diverse range of molecules defined by being relatively water-insoluble or nonpolar compounds of biological origin, including waxes, fatty acids, fatty-acid derived phospholipids, sphingolipids, glycolipids, and terpenoids (e.g., retinoids and steroids). This makes them unique from the other groups of biomolecules as they are defined by a property, rather than structure. This makes them a diverse group. Some lipids are linear, open-chain aliphatic molecules, while others have ring structures. Some are aromatic (with a cyclic [ring] and planar [flat] structure) while others are not. Some are flexible, while others are rigid.

Lipids are extremely structurally diverse. Some commonly encountered lipids, such as triglycerides, the main group of bulk lipids, and phospholipids, a major component of cell membranes, consist of a glycerol backbone bound to fatty acids (3 for the former, 2 for the latter). Fatty acids may be saturated (no double bonds in the carbon chain) or unsaturated (one or more double bonds in the carbon chain). Fatty acids are often considered the simplest lipids, and the smallest fatty acids, short chain fatty acids (SCFAs), are noted for their health benefits. However, many more lipids exist that do not follow this pattern, hence they are not considered polymers since there is no one repeating molecule found across all lipids. Consequently, components like fatty acids, glycerol, and in other lipid types, sphingosines, are not monomers. Consider, for example, cholesterol: a lipid without any of these "building block" molecules, instead consisting of a few nonpolar rings fused together and some functional groups extending off.

Most lipids are largely nonpolar but may have some polar character. In general, the bulk of their structure is nonpolar or hydrophobic ("water-fearing"), meaning that it does not interact well with polar solvents like water. Some lipids, such as fatty acids and membrane-forming phospholipids, have a polar or hydrophilic ("water-loving") head group which will tend to associate with polar solvents like water. This makes them amphiphilic molecules (having both hydrophobic and hydrophilic portions). In the case of cholesterol, the polar group is a mere –OH (hydroxyl or alcohol). Phospholipids often have larger and more diverse polar head groups.

Lipids are an integral part of our daily diet. Most oils and milk products that we use for cooking and eating like butter, cheese, ghee etc. are composed of fats, which can refer to a broader class of lipids, but in nutrition and food science refers to the triglycerides we eat. Vegetable oils are rich in various polyunsaturated fatty acids (PUFA) which may exert cardioprotective effects, although evidence is still inconclusive as to their overall impact on health. Lipid-containing foods undergo digestion within the body and are broken into fatty acids and glycerol, the final degradation products of triglycerides. Lipids, especially phospholipids, are also used in various pharmaceutical products, either as co-solubilizers (e.g. in parenteral infusions) or else as drug carrier components (e.g. in a liposome or transfersome).

=== Proteins ===
The general structure of an α-amino acid, with the amino group on the left and the carboxyl group on the right

Proteins are polymers made from monomers called amino acids. An amino acid consists of an alpha carbon atom attached to an amino group, –NH_{2}, a carboxylic acid group, –COOH (although these exist as –NH_{3}^{+} and –COO^{−} under physiologic conditions), a simple hydrogen atom, and a side chain commonly denoted as "–R". The side chain "R" is different for each amino acid of which there are 20 standard ones. It is this "R" group that makes each amino acid different, and the properties of the side chains greatly influence the overall three-dimensional conformation of a protein. Some amino acids have functions by themselves or in a modified form; for instance, glutamate functions as an important neurotransmitter. To form proteins, they react via dehydration synthesis which removes a water molecule and forms a peptide bond between the nitrogen of one amino acid's amino group and the carbon of the other's carboxylic acid group. The resulting molecule is called a dipeptide, and short stretches of amino acids (usually, fewer than thirty) are called peptides or polypeptides. Longer stretches merit the title proteins. As an example, the important blood serum protein albumin contains 585 amino acid residues.

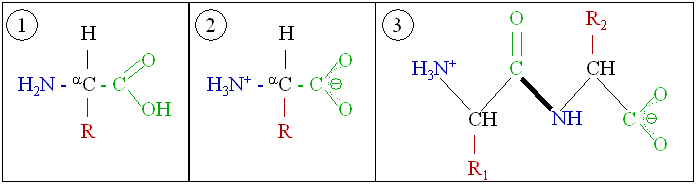
Generic amino acids (1) in neutral form, (2) as they exist physiologically, and (3) joined as a dipeptide

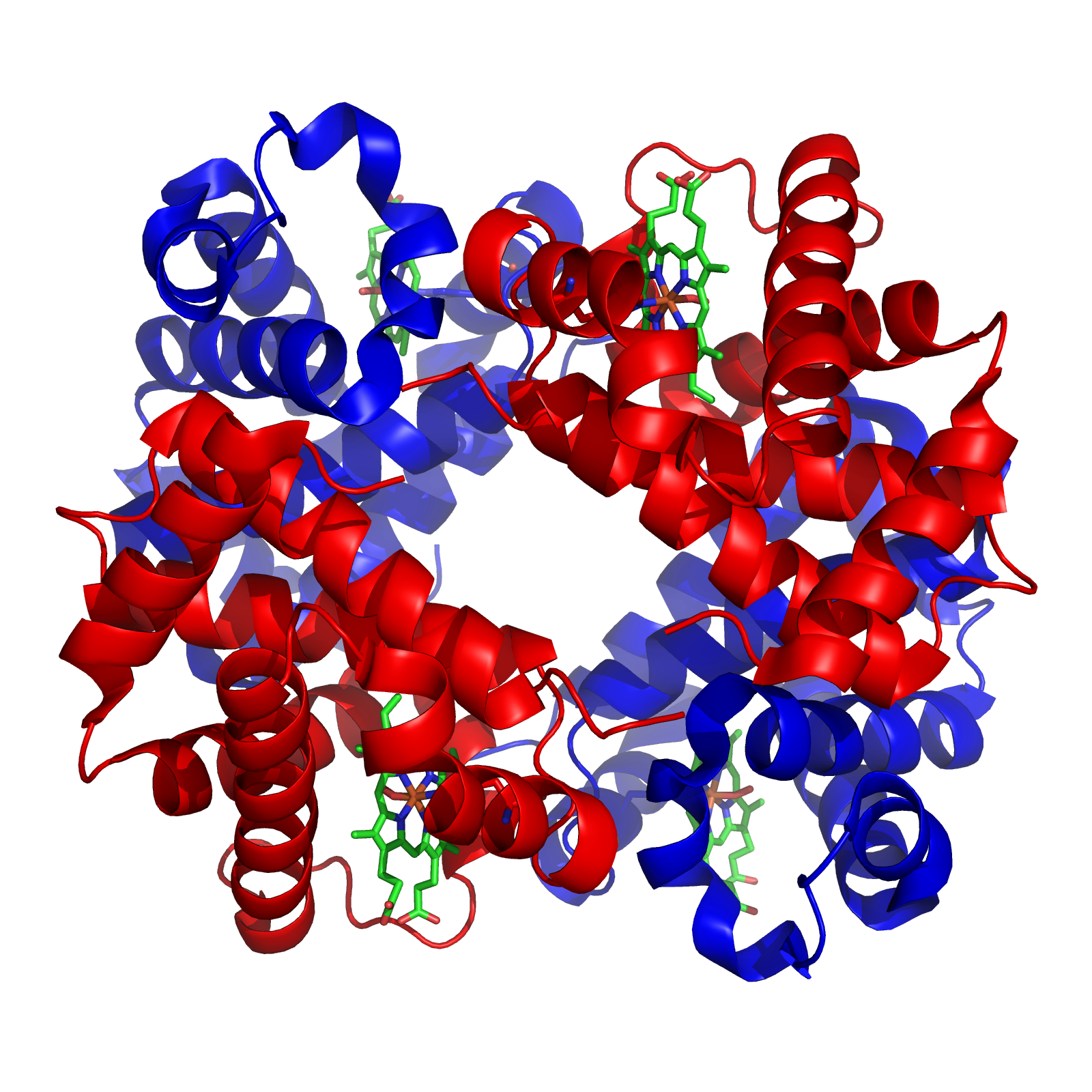
A schematic of hemoglobin. The red and blue ribbons represent the protein globin; the green structures are the heme groups.

Proteins can have structural and/or functional roles. For instance, movements of the proteins actin and myosin ultimately are responsible for the contraction of skeletal muscle. One property many proteins have is that they specifically bind to a certain molecule or class of molecules—they may be extremely selective in what they bind. Antibodies are an example of proteins that attach to one specific type of molecule. Antibodies are composed of two heavy and two light chains which are linked by disulfide linkages between specific cysteine residues.Antibodies are specific through variation based on differences in the N-terminal domain, which allows them to bind immunological antigens strongly. The enzyme-linked immunosorbent assay (ELISA), which uses antibodies, is one of the most sensitive tests modern medicine uses to detect various biomolecules.

Probably the most important proteins, however, are the enzymes. Virtually every reaction in a living cell requires an enzyme to lower the activation energy of the reaction. These molecules recognize specific reactant molecules called substrates; they then catalyze the reaction between them. By lowering the activation energy, the enzyme speeds up that reaction by a rate of 10^{11} or more; a reaction that would normally take over 3,000 years to complete spontaneously might take less than a second with an enzyme. The enzyme itself is not used up in the process and is free to catalyze the same reaction with a new set of substrates. Using various modifiers, the activity of the enzyme can be regulated, enabling control of the biochemistry of the cell as a whole.

The structure of proteins is traditionally described in a hierarchy of four levels. The primary structure of a protein consists of its linear sequence of amino acids; for instance, "alanine-glycine-tryptophan-serine-glutamate-asparagine-glycine-lysine-...". Secondary structure is concerned with local morphology (morphology being the study of structure). Some combinations of amino acids will tend to curl up in a coil called an α-helix or into a sheet called a β-sheet; some α-helixes can be seen in the hemoglobin schematic above. Tertiary structure is the entire three-dimensional shape of the protein. This shape is determined by the sequence of amino acids. In fact, a single change can change the entire structure. For example, the beta chain of hemoglobin contains 146 amino acid residues; substitution of the glutamate residue at position 6 with a valine residue changes the behavior of hemoglobin so much that it results in sickle-cell disease. Finally, quaternary structure is how separately polypeptide chains interact with one another to form the final protein. This applies only to proteins composed of multiple chains, such as hemoglobin with its four subunits, whereas many others have only one chain.

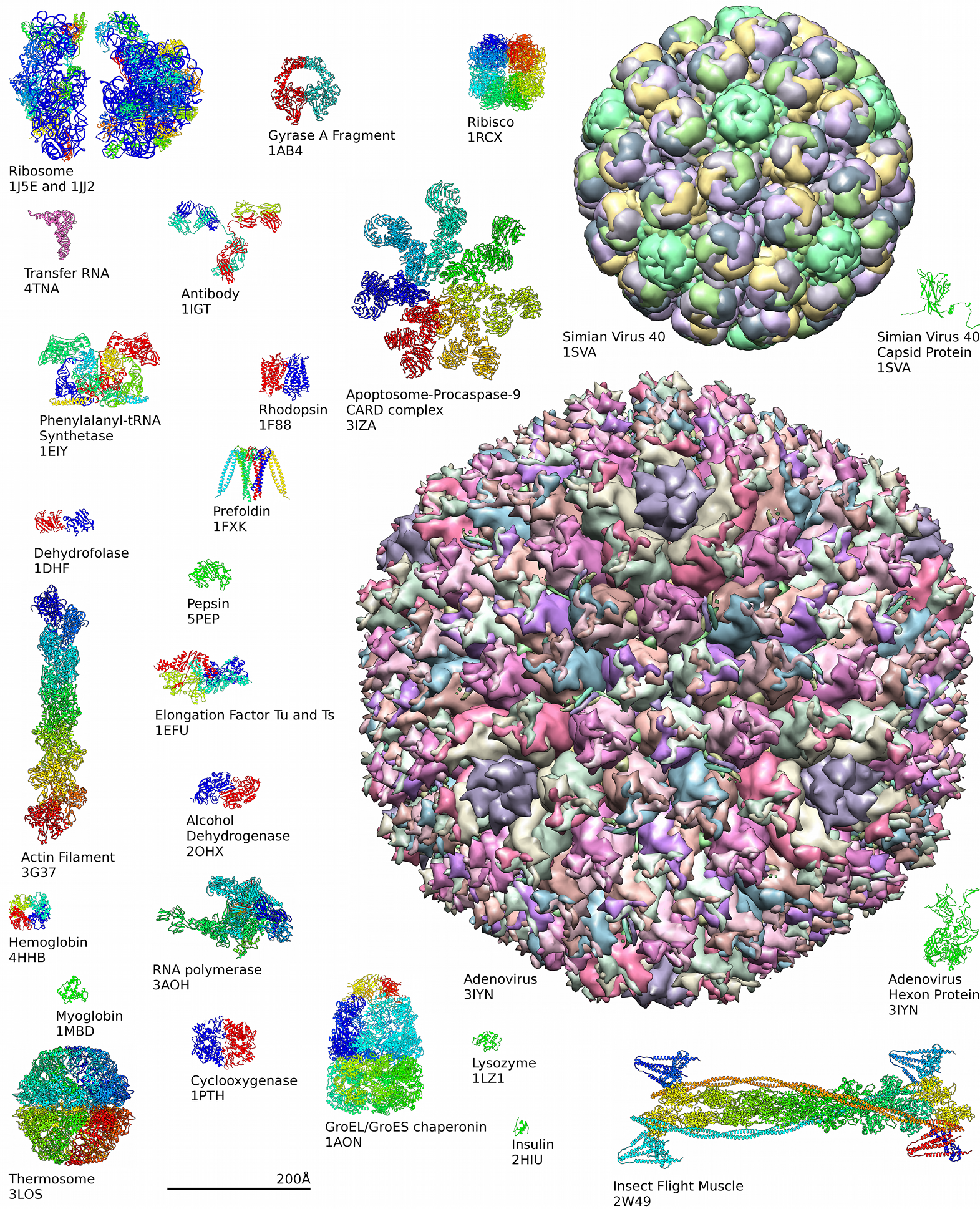
Examples of protein structures from the Protein Data Bank

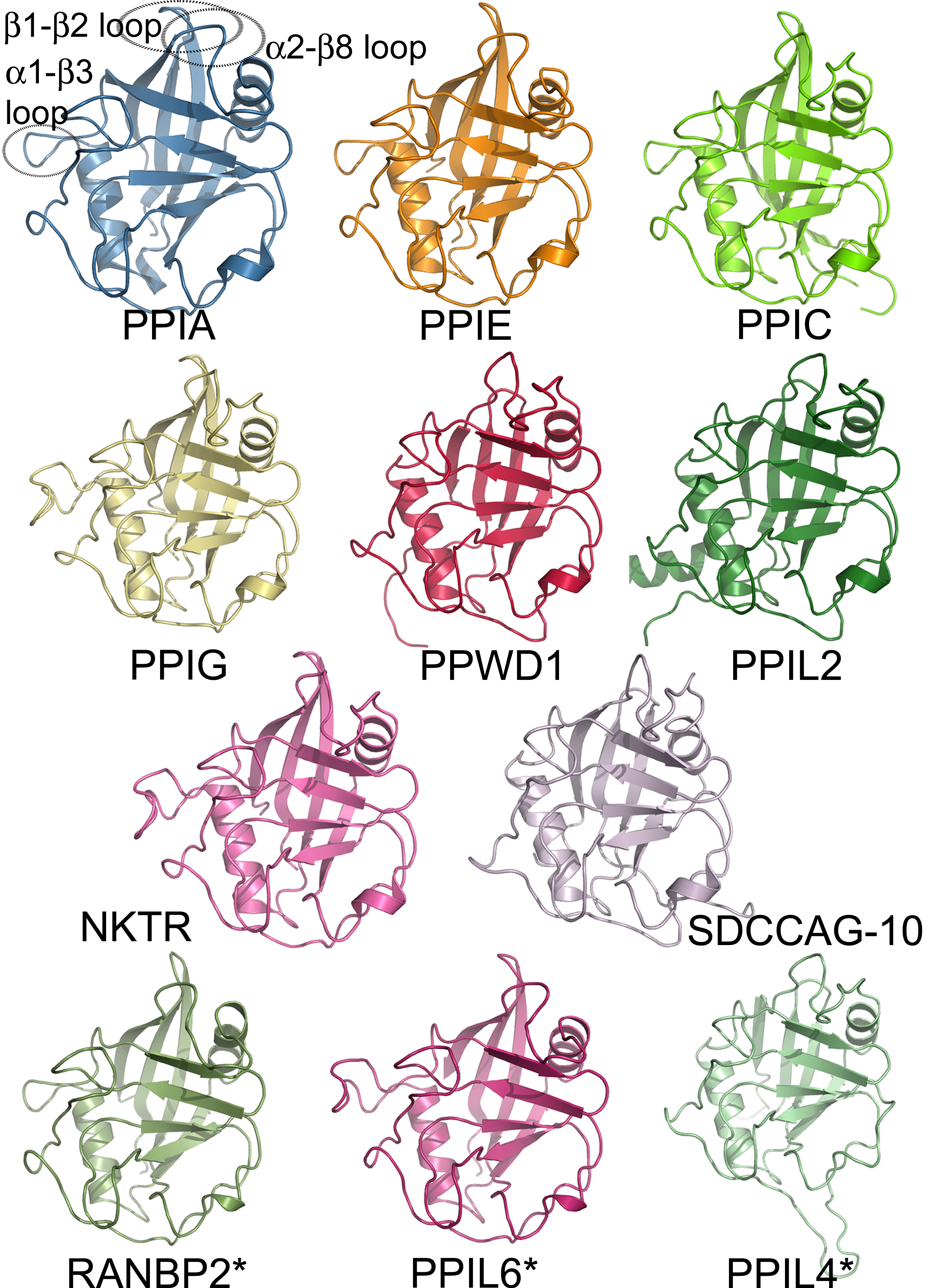
Members of a protein family, as represented by the structures of the isomerase domains

Ingested proteins are usually broken up into single amino acids or dipeptides in the small intestine and then absorbed. They can then be joined to form new proteins. Intermediate products of glycolysis, the citric acid cycle, and the pentose phosphate pathway can be used to form all twenty amino acids, and most bacteria and plants possess all the necessary enzymes to synthesize them. Humans and other mammals, however, can synthesize only half of them. They cannot synthesize isoleucine, leucine, lysine, methionine, phenylalanine, threonine, tryptophan, histidine, and valine. Because they must be ingested, these are the essential amino acids. Mammals do possess the enzymes to synthesize alanine, asparagine, aspartate, cysteine, glutamate, glutamine, glycine, proline, serine, and tyrosine, the nonessential amino acids. While they can synthesize arginine, they cannot produce it in sufficient amounts for young, growing animals, and so these are often considered essential amino acids as well.

If the amino group is removed from an amino acid, it leaves behind a carbon skeleton called an α-keto acid. Enzymes called transaminases can easily transfer the amino group from one amino acid (making it an α-keto acid) to another α-keto acid (making it an amino acid). This is important in the biosynthesis of amino acids, as for many of the pathways, intermediates from other biochemical pathways are converted to the α-keto acid skeleton, and then an amino group is added, often via transamination. The amino acids may then be linked together to form a protein.

Proteins are broken down by first hydrolyzing them into their component amino acids. Further breakdown of these amino acids releases free ammonia (NH_{3}), existing as the ammonium ion (NH_{4}^{+}) in blood, which is toxic to life forms. A suitable method for excreting it must therefore exist. Different tactics have evolved in different animals, depending on the animals' needs. Unicellular organisms release the ammonia into the environment. Likewise, bony fish can release ammonia into the water where it is quickly diluted. In general, mammals convert ammonia into urea, via the urea cycle.

In order to determine whether two proteins are related, or in other words to decide whether they are homologous or not, scientists use sequence-comparison methods. Methods like sequence alignments and structural alignments are powerful tools that help scientists identify homologies between related molecules. Homology helps scientists understand the evolutionary relationships between proteins and extend understanding of their structure and thus their function.

=== Nucleic acids ===
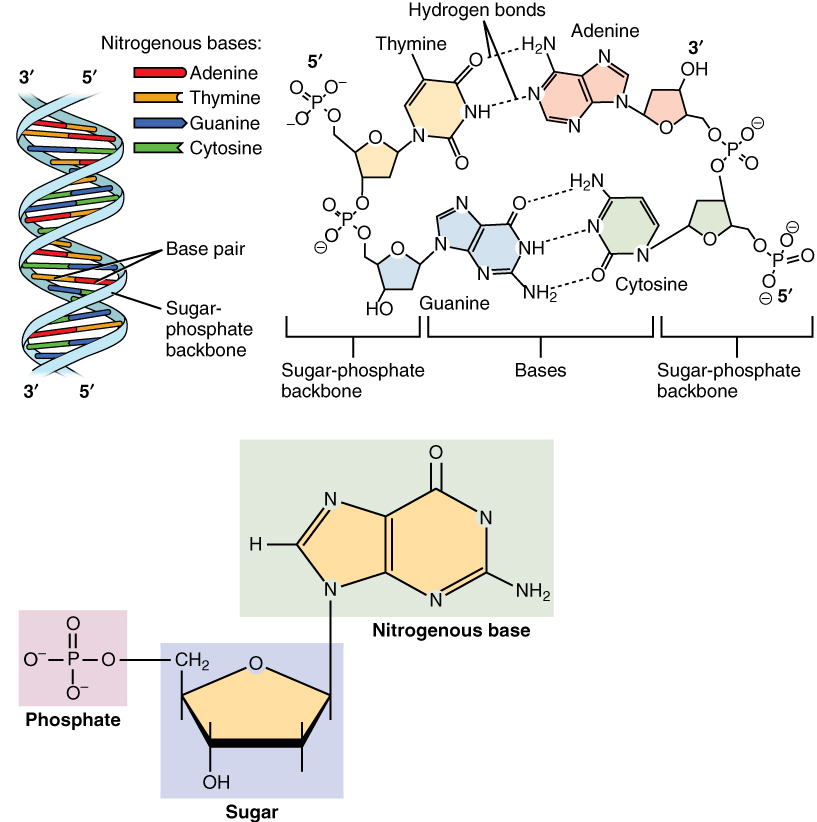
The structure of deoxyribonucleic acid (DNA); the picture shows the monomers being put together.

Nucleic acids, so-called because of their prevalence in cellular nuclei, is the generic name of this family of biopolymers. They are complex, high-molecular-weight biochemical macromolecules that encode genetic information in all living cells and viruses. Their monomers are called nucleotides, and each consists of three components: a nitrogenous heterocyclic base (either a purine or a pyrimidine), a pentose sugar, and a phosphate group.

Structural elements of common nucleic acid constituents. Because they contain at least one phosphate group, the compounds marked nucleoside monophosphate, nucleoside diphosphate and nucleoside triphosphate are all nucleotides (not phosphate-lacking nucleosides).

The most common nucleic acids are deoxyribonucleic acid (DNA) and ribonucleic acid (RNA). The phosphate group and the sugar of each form nucleotide bonds to form the backbone of the nucleic acid, while the sequence of nitrogenous bases stores the information. The most common nitrogenous bases are adenine, cytosine, guanine, thymine, and uracil. The nitrogenous bases of each strand of a nucleic acid will form hydrogen bonds with a specific partner base in a complementary strand of nucleic acid. Adenine binds with thymine or uracil, and cytosine and guanine bind one another. Adenine, thymine, and uracil form two hydrogen bonds, while cytosine and guanine form three.

Aside from the genetic material of the cell, nucleic acids often play a role as second messengers, as well as forming the base molecule for adenosine triphosphate (ATP), the primary energy-carrier molecule found in all living organisms. Other nucleotides besides adenosine can also be found forming other, less common, energy-carrying molecules such as guanosine in GTP or uracil in UTP. Also, while adenine, cytosine, and guanine occur in both RNA and DNA, thymine occurs only in DNA and uracil occurs in RNA.

== Metabolism ==
=== Carbohydrates as energy source ===
Glucose is an energy source in most life forms. For instance, polysaccharides are broken down into their monomers by enzymes (glycogen phosphorylase removes glucose residues from glycogen, a polysaccharide). Disaccharides like lactose or sucrose are cleaved into their two component monosaccharides.

==== Glycolysis (anaerobic) ====
The metabolic pathway of glycolysis converts glucose to pyruvate via a series of intermediate metabolites. Each chemical modification is performed by a different enzyme. Steps 1 and 3 consume ATP and steps 7 and 10 produce ATP. Since steps 6–10 occur twice per glucose molecule, this leads to a net production of ATP.

Glucose is mainly metabolized by a very important ten-step pathway called glycolysis, the net result of which is to break down one molecule of glucose into two molecules of pyruvate. This also produces a net two molecules of ATP, the energy currency of cells, along with two reducing equivalents of converting NAD^{+} (nicotinamide adenine dinucleotide: oxidized form) to NADH (nicotinamide adenine dinucleotide: reduced form). This does not require oxygen; if no oxygen is available (or the cell cannot use oxygen), the NAD is restored by converting the pyruvate to lactate (lactic acid) (e.g. in humans) or to ethanol plus carbon dioxide (e.g. in yeast). Other monosaccharides like galactose and fructose can be converted into intermediates of the glycolytic pathway.

==== Aerobic ====
In aerobic cells with sufficient oxygen, as in most human cells, the pyruvate is further metabolized. It is irreversibly converted to acetyl-CoA, giving off one carbon atom as the waste product carbon dioxide, generating another reducing equivalent as NADH. The two molecules acetyl-CoA (from one molecule of glucose) then enter the citric acid cycle, producing two molecules of ATP, six more NADH molecules and two reduced (ubi)quinones (via FADH_{2} as enzyme-bound cofactor), and releasing the remaining carbon atoms as carbon dioxide. The produced NADH and quinol molecules then feed into the enzyme complexes of the respiratory chain, an electron transport system transferring the electrons ultimately to oxygen and conserving the released energy in the form of a proton gradient over a membrane (inner mitochondrial membrane in eukaryotes). Thus, oxygen is reduced to water and the original electron acceptors NAD^{+} and quinone are regenerated. This is why humans breathe in oxygen and breathe out carbon dioxide. The energy released from transferring the electrons from high-energy states in NADH and quinol is conserved first as proton gradient and converted to ATP via ATP synthase. This generates an additional 28 molecules of ATP (24 from the 8 NADH + 4 from the 2 quinols), totaling to 32 molecules of ATP conserved per degraded glucose (two from glycolysis + two from the citrate cycle). It is clear that using oxygen to completely oxidize glucose provides an organism with far more energy than any oxygen-independent metabolic feature, and this is thought to be the reason why complex life appeared only after Earth's atmosphere accumulated large amounts of oxygen.

==== Gluconeogenesis ====
In vertebrates, vigorously contracting skeletal muscles (during weightlifting or sprinting, for example) do not receive enough oxygen to meet the energy demand, and so they shift to anaerobic metabolism, converting glucose to lactate. The combination of glucose from noncarbohydrates origin, such as fat and proteins. This only happens when glycogen supplies in the liver are worn out. The pathway is a crucial reversal of glycolysis from pyruvate to glucose and can use many sources like amino acids, glycerol and Krebs Cycle. Large scale protein and fat catabolism usually occur when those suffer from starvation or certain endocrine disorders. The liver regenerates the glucose, using a process called gluconeogenesis. This process is not quite the opposite of glycolysis, and actually requires three times the amount of energy gained from glycolysis (six molecules of ATP are used, compared to the two gained in glycolysis). Analogous to the above reactions, the glucose produced can then undergo glycolysis in tissues that need energy, be stored as glycogen (or starch in plants), or be converted to other monosaccharides or joined into di- or oligosaccharides. The combined pathways of glycolysis during exercise, lactate's crossing via the bloodstream to the liver, subsequent gluconeogenesis and release of glucose into the bloodstream is called the Cori cycle.

== Relationship to other "molecular-scale" biological sciences ==
Researchers in biochemistry use specific techniques native to biochemistry (for instance, enzyme kinetics or subcellular fractionation), but increasingly combine these with techniques and ideas developed in other disciplines, including molecular biology, genetics and biophysics. Biochemistry studies the chemistry required for biological activity of molecules, molecular biology studies the biological activity of those molecules, and genetics studies their heredity, which happens to be carried by the genome of the living organism. The relationship between these disciplines is as follows:

- Biochemistry is the study of the chemical substances and vital processes occurring in living organisms. Biochemists focus heavily on the role, function, and structure of biomolecules. The study of the chemistry behind biological processes and the synthesis of biologically active molecules are applications of biochemistry. Biochemistry studies life at the atomic and molecular level.
- Molecular biology is the study of molecular underpinnings of the biological phenomena, focusing on molecular synthesis, modification, mechanisms and interactions. The central dogma of molecular biology, where genetic material is transcribed into RNA and then translated into protein, despite being oversimplified, still provides a good starting point for understanding the field. This concept has been revised in light of emerging novel roles for RNA.
- Genetics is the study of the effect of genetic differences in organisms. This can often be inferred by the absence of a normal component (e.g. one gene). The study of "mutants" – organisms that lack one or more functional components with respect to the so-called "wild type" or normal phenotype. Genetic interactions (epistasis) can often confound simple interpretations of such "knockout" studies.

== See also ==
- Astrobiology
- Biochemistry (journal)
- Biological Chemistry (journal)
- Biophysics
- Chemical ecology
- Citric acid cycle
- Computational biomodeling
- EC number
- Hypothetical types of biochemistry
- List of biochemistry topics
- List of biochemists
- List of biomolecules
- Metabolomics
- Molecular biology
- Molecular medicine
- Structural biology
