= Douglas Reynolds Gallery =

Contemporary art gallery in British Columbia

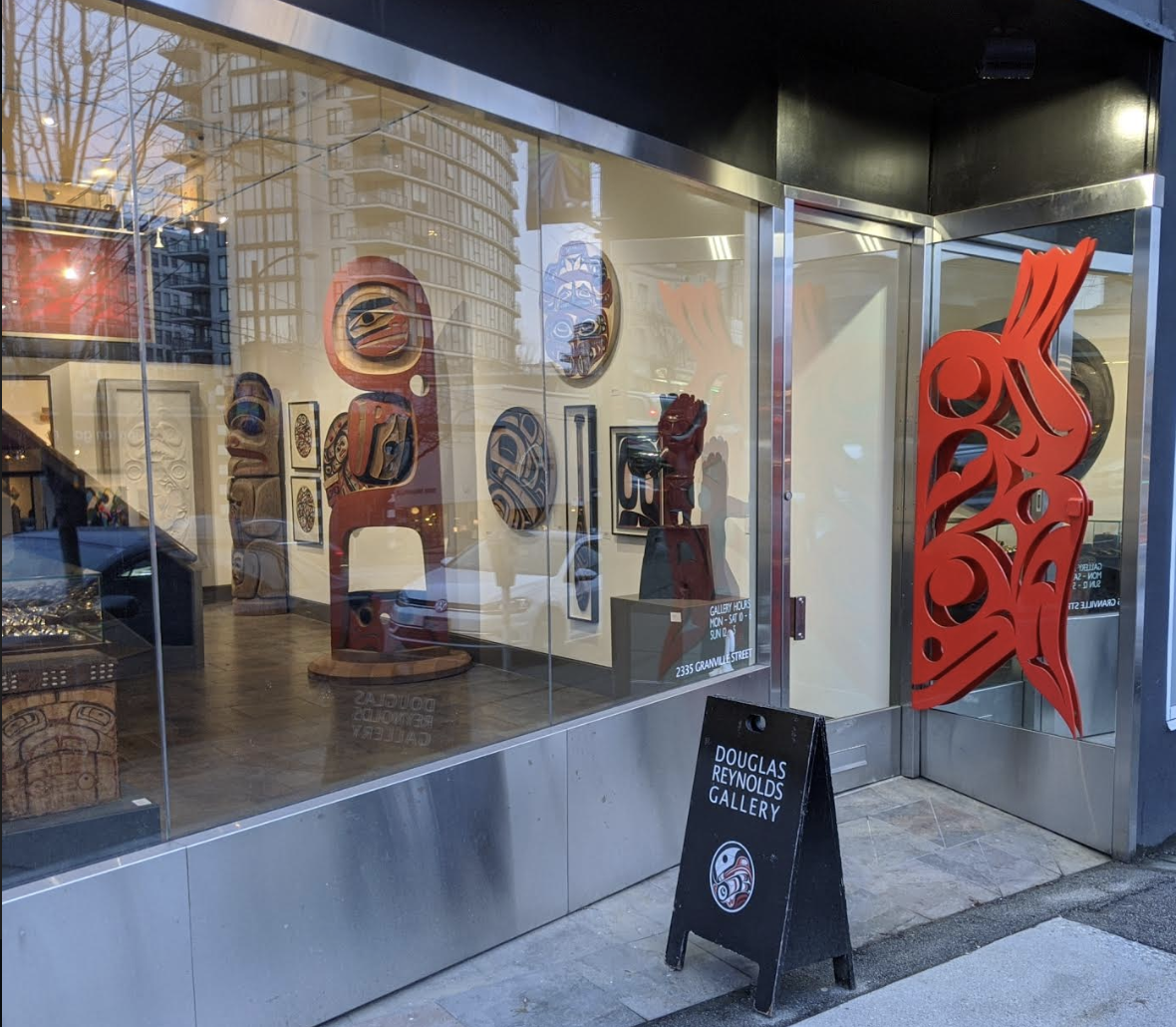
- Douglas Reynolds Gallery, 2020
- Established: 1995
- Location: 2335 Granville Street, Vancouver, British Columbia, Canada
- Coordinates: 49.2648°N 123.1387°W
- Type: Northwest Coast art gallery
- Founder: Douglas Reynolds
- Website: douglasreynoldsgallery.com

Douglas Reynolds Gallery[1] specializes in world renowned Indigenous Northwest Coast art. Working directly with a variety of artists, the gallery represents cultural groups spanning from the Haida and Tlingit in Northern British Columbia, to the Coast Salish in the Vancouver area and Northern Washington state.

== History ==
In 1987 Douglas Reynolds began working in the Northwest Coast Indigenous art world, which was to become his life’s passion. A a member of the Art Dealers' Association of Canada, Reynolds has over 30 years of experience working in this industry. Over his career he has sat on numerous boards, including the Bill Reid Foundation (2002-2006) and the Canadian Craft Museum (1998-2001).

Reynolds founded the gallery in March of 1995, with its opening night being met with great success. Renowned Kwakwaka’wakw artist Beau Dick drummed and blessed the new space, while acclaimed artists Jim Hart (Haida) and Larry Rosso (Carrier) marked the occasion with the release of new works for exhibition.

Over the past 30 years, the gallery has established itself as a leading destination for Northwest Coast Indigenous art, representing established, early-career, and emerging artists. Its exhibitions have presented a wide range of contemporary and traditional works across diverse mediums, providing the public with opportunities to experience and collect some of the region’s most significant Indigenous art.

Presently, the gallery provides specialized guidance for new and experienced collectors.

== Artwork ==
=== Wood ===
The gallery displays woodwork including totem poles, panels, carved paddles and masks.[2] Nearly all totem poles are carved from a single trunk of a Western red cedar, known as the tree of life on the Northwest Coast because of its versatility and abundance. Other wood types on display include yellow cedar, maple, and alder.

=== Castings ===
Castings in Indigenous art, particularly among Northwest Coast Indigenous artists, have become increasingly common since the late 20th century, as artists explored new materials and methods to complement traditional carving and design.

Forton castings refer to sculptures or artworks created using Forton MG, a gypsum-based composite material that’s strengthened with polymers and fiberglass. It’s widely used in the art world as a cost-effective, lightweight, and highly durable alternative to solid plaster or bronze. Artists produce limited editions of sculptures in Forton as a more affordable alternative to bronze.

Bronze / Aluminum; aluminum castings refer to sculptures or art objects created by casting molten aluminum into molds. This method is commonly used by contemporary artists and foundries because aluminum offers a distinct combination of lightness, durability, and aesthetic versatility. Bronze casting involves pouring molten bronze (an alloy typically of copper and tin) into a mold to create a sculpture. The most common method used is the lost-wax casting process (cire-perdue), though sand casting is also employed for larger or less intricate works. In the art world, bronze is favored for its strength, durability, and ability to capture fine details, making it the benchmark for high-quality sculpture.

Glass sculpture refers to artworks that are formed, shaped, or cast in glass, a medium prized for its transparency, luminosity, and fragility. Glass art spans from delicate blown pieces to solid cast forms, and it occupies a unique space between fine art, craft, and design.

=== Serigraphs ===
Serigraphy was introduced to Indigenous Northwest Coast art in the 1960s and 1970s, as part of a broader movement to revitalize and commercialize Indigenous art forms. Artists like Bill Reid (Haida), Robert Davidson (Haida), and Tony Hunt (Kwakwaka'wakw) began producing limited edition prints. Serigraphs, also known as screen prints or silkscreens, are a type of fine art print made using the screen printing process, where ink is pushed through a mesh stencil onto a surface, typically paper, but also fabric, metal, or wood. In the art world, serigraphy is a respected printmaking technique known for its vibrant colors, sharp lines, and layered textures.

=== Jewelry ===
The gallery carries a wide variety of jewelry products[3] that continue a tradition of personal adornment dating back to the 1840s. It also sells jewelry including gold and silver rings, bracelets, and pendants. The majority of pieces are modern works, although there is also historic jewelry, including Haida artist Bill Reid's work.

== Media and commissions ==
TELUS has furnished its Vancouver headquarters with the help of the gallery.

The gallery was featured in Maker of Monsters, a 2017 documentary on the life and work of Kwakwaka'wakw artist Beau Dick. Douglas Reynolds was interviewed in the documentary talking about his professional and personal relationship with Dick, lasting over 30 years.

In 2020, Haisla artist Hollie Bartlett gifted an 18kt gold whale tail pendant from Douglas Reynolds Gallery to the Vancouver non-profit Justice for Girls, who donated it to Meghan Markle.

In February 2020, a visiting Ainu artist from Japan, Hiroyuki Shimokura, visited the gallery and met with Tsimshian artist Phil Gray.

== See also ==
- Northwest Coast Art
- Contemporary Art
- Canadian Art
- Coast Salish Art
- Haida People
- Bill Reid
- Robert Davidson

== Works cited ==
- Dawkins, Alexander (2019). Understanding Northwest Coast Indigenous Jewelry. Vancouver, British Columbia: Douglas & McIntyre. ISBN 978-1-77164-297-2.
- Stewart, Hilary (1984). Cedar: Tree of Life to the Northwest Coast Indians. Vancouver, British Columbia: Douglas & McIntyre. ISBN 0-88894-437-3.
- Stewart, Hilary (1993). Looking at Totem Poles. Vancouver, British Columbia: Douglas & McIntyre. ISBN 978-1-55054-074-1.
