= South Granville, Vancouver =

Coordinates: 49.262669°N 123.138617°W

South Granville
- Neighbourhood
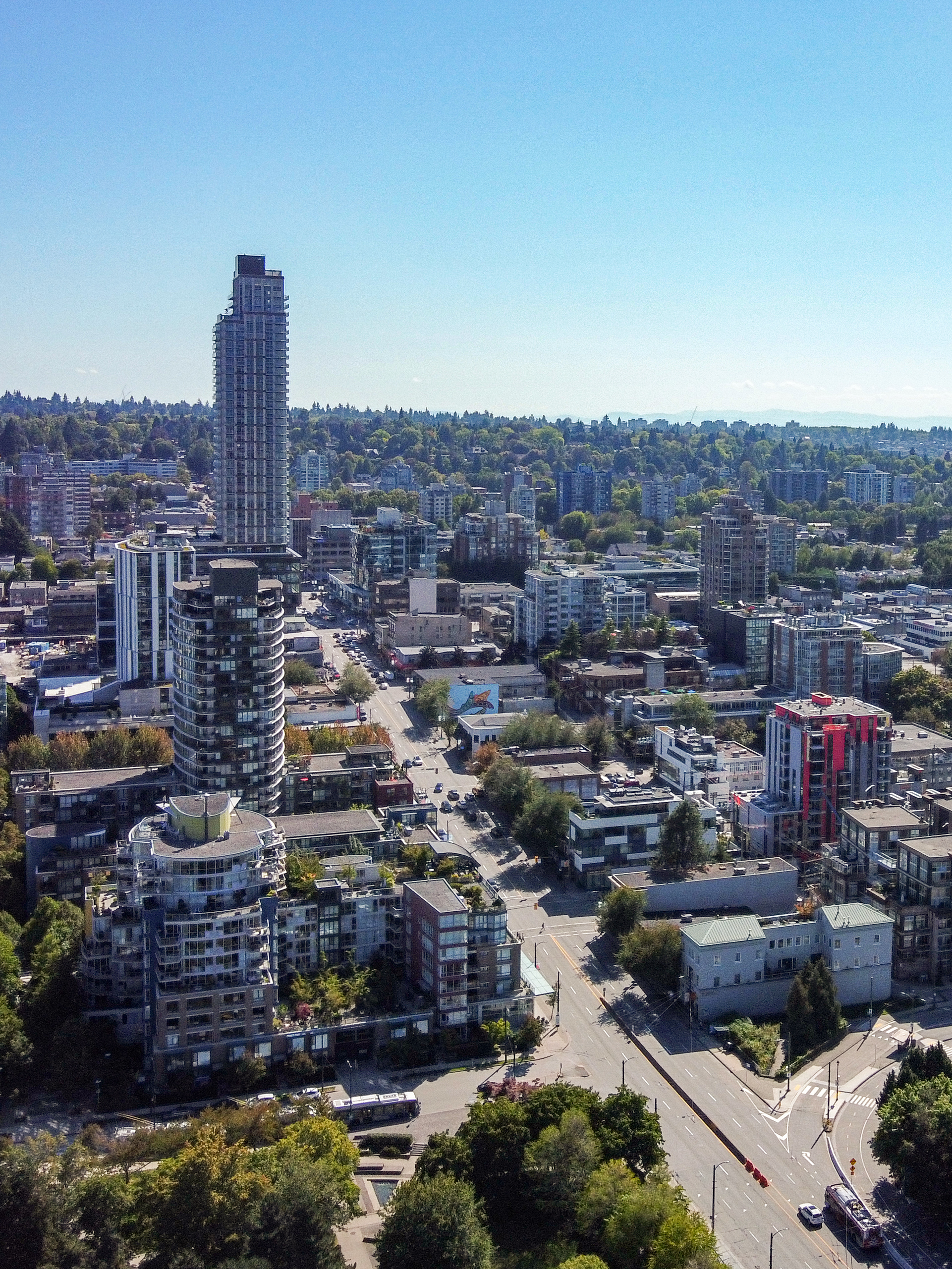
- Aerial view South Granville, looking south （2025）
- Interactive map of South Granville
- Country: Canada
- Province: British Columbia
- City: Vancouver
- Location: Fairview
- Federal district: Vancouver Granville
- Provincial district: Vancouver-South Granville
- Time zone: UTC−07:00 (PCT)
- Website: www.southgranville.org

Established in 1997, South Granville is a business improvement area (BIA) and neighbourhood south of Vancouver's downtown core, centred along Granville Street and bordered by the neighbourhoods of Kitsilano, Fairview and Shaughnessy.

Separated from Downtown by False Creek, the area runs along Granville Street from the south side of the Granville Street Bridge up to 16th Ave, where storefronts are replaced by the residences and hedges of Shaughnessy.

1907 has been decided as the unofficial birth year of the neighbourhood. In that year Richard Marpole drew up plans for Shaughnessy Heights, the Canadian Pacific Railway's newest subdivision south of 16th Ave, pitched as an alternative to the then-upscale West End ("Blueblood Alley"). This is now known as "First Shaughnessy", or simply Shaughnessy. That same year, what was once Centre Street was given its present name, Granville Street, as the portion north of the bridge already bore that name.

South Granville contains "Gallery Row", an area between Broadway and the foot of the Granville Bridge that which is home to a number of art galleries: Bau-Xi Gallery, Douglas Reynolds Gallery, Ian Tan Gallery, Petley Jones Gallery, and Uno Langmann Limited. The South Granville Gallery Association (SGGA) represents the leading fine art galleries on Gallery Row.

The neighbourhood is home to the historic Stanley Theatre, built in 1931. Once a popular cinema, the Stanley Theatre is now the stage of the Arts Club Theatre Company and the Industrial Alliance Stage. In 2007, the South Granville BIA commemorated the area's centennial by encasing a state-of-the-art, stainless steel time capsule in concrete and stone under the entrance of the theatre.
