= LaTiesha Fazakas =

Canadian art dealer

LaTiesha Fazakas (born 1971) is a Canadian curator, filmmaker, and art dealer with a specialization in Northwest Coast Indigenous Art. She is the owner and director of Fazakas Gallery, a contemporary Indigenous gallery located in Vancouver, British Columbia.

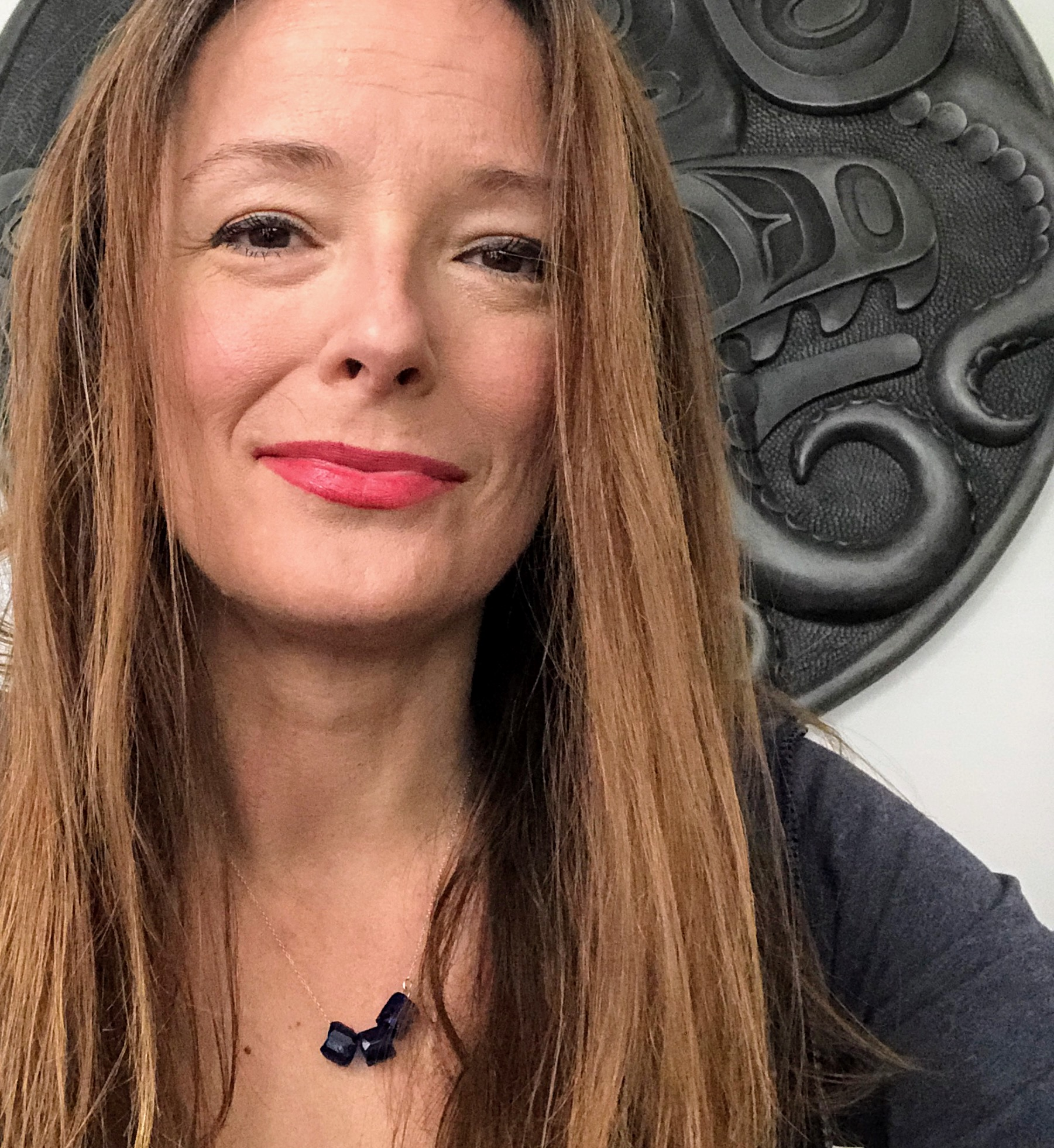
LaTiesha Fazakas

== Career ==
After graduating with a B.A. in Art History from the University of British Columbia, Fazakas worked at a retail-oriented traditional Indigenous gallery in Vancouver for nearly 11 years before she founded Fazakas Gallery.

=== Fazakas Gallery ===
In 2013, she established Fazakas Gallery, an art space that focuses on Contemporary Indigenous art and takes a curatorial approach to exploring cross-cultural works. Fazakas Gallery has represented many contemporary Indigenous artist, such as Northwest coast artist Beau Dick, Rande Cook, and Don Yeomans, and Inuk artist Maureen Gruben. The gallery has exhibited artists at a range of North American art fairs, including Seattle Art Fair, NADA, Papier, Art Toronto, The Armory Show, and the Independent Art Fair.

=== Curatorial works ===
==== Beau Dick Curatorial Coordinator, Documenta 14 ====
In 2017, Fazakas was the curatorial coordinator for Kwakwaka'wakw (Kwakiutl) artist, activist, and chief Beau Dick’s participation in Documenta 14 in Athens, Greece and Kassel, Germany. The exhibition garnered international acclaim and launched contemporary Northwest Coast art to a global scale.

==== Beau Dick: Devoured by Consumerism ====
In 2019, as an independent curator, Fazakas co-curated the first New York solo exhibition of Beau Dick, Beau Dick: Devoured by Consumerism, with Matthew Higgs at White Columns, New York. The exhibition was also shown in at the Remai Modern, Saskatchewan, from June – September 2019.

== Publication ==
Accompanying the exhibition of the same name, Fazakas authored the publication, Beau Dick: Devoured By Consumerism, a catalogue showcasing the life and work of Beau Dick that featured essay contributions from John Cussans and Candice Hopkins. The 96-page hardcover book is accompanied by colour photographs of Beau Dick’s masks, along with brief textual descriptions that provide insight into their cultural significance. The book is published by Figure 1 in collaboration with the Fazakas Gallery in Vancouver.

== Film production ==
Fall 2017 saw Fazakas debut her feature-length documentary, Maker of Monsters: The Extraordinary Life of Beau Dick, a film co-directed with Canadian film producer Natalie Boll. The documentary shows Dick's life and work within ancient traditions, cultural and political movements while exploring crossovers into the contemporary art world. Fazakas asserts in the documentary: "Anyone that has encountered a piece of Beau's, immediately has an emotional reaction to it". It also features numerous interviews with Dick while he reflects on his mask carving and his experiences growing up. The film made its world premiere at the 2017 Vancouver International Film Festival. Meet Beau Dick: Maker of Monsters won the Cultural Currents Award at the Victoria International Film Festival.
