= Edwin B. Hart =

American biochemist (1874–1953)

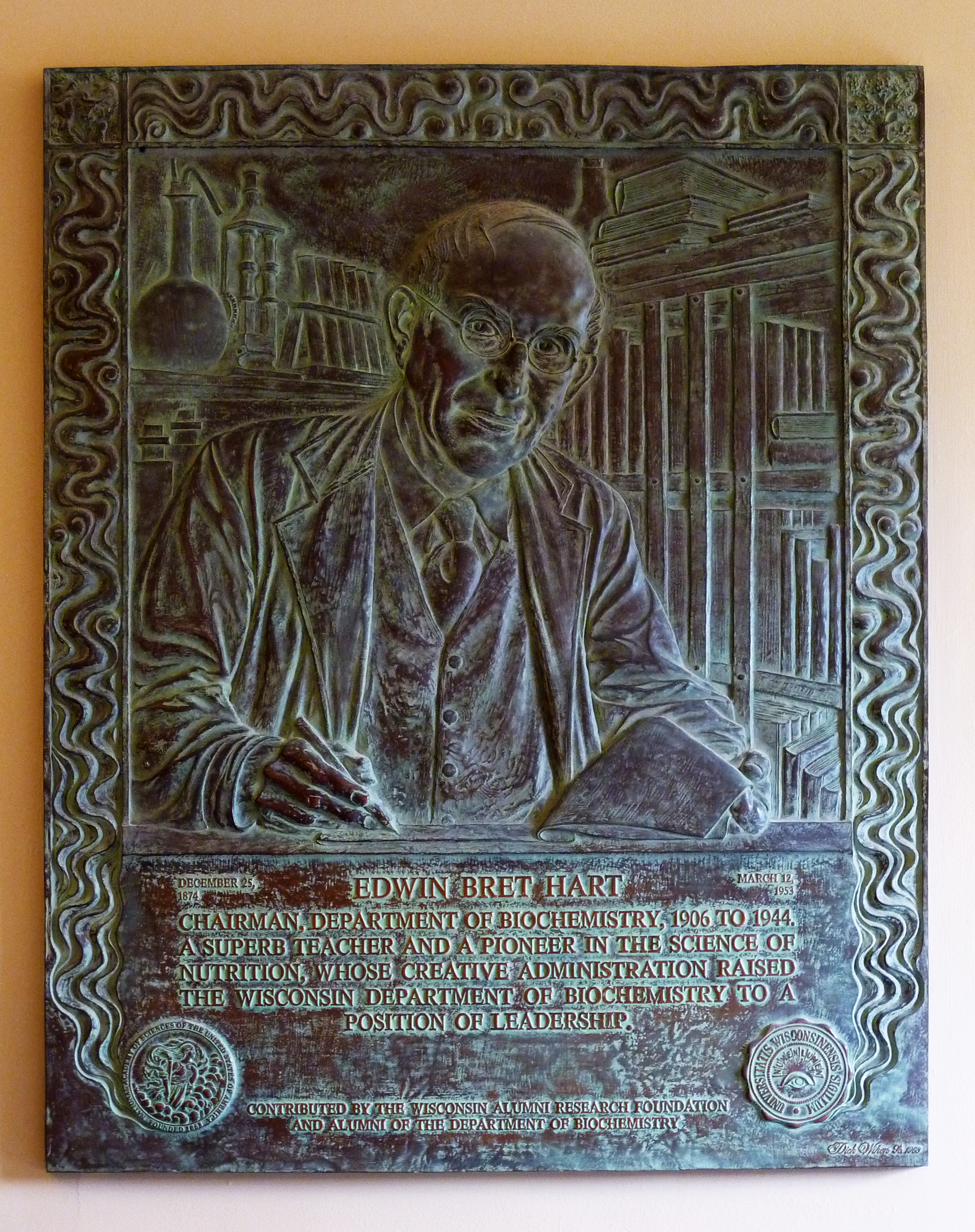
- Born: December 25, 1874; Sandusky, Ohio
- Died: March 12, 1953 (aged 78); Madison, Wisconsin
- Education: University of Marburg, University of Heidelberg
- Known for: "Single-grain experiment"
- Scientific career
- Fields: Physiological chemistry
- Institutions: New York State Agricultural Experiment Station, University of Michigan, University of Wisconsin
- Academic advisors: Stephen M. Babcock

Edwin Bret Hart (December 25, 1874 – March 12, 1953) was an American biochemist long associated with the University of Wisconsin-Madison.

A native of Sandusky, Ohio, Hart studied physiological chemistry in Germany under Albrecht Kossel (recipient of the 1910 Nobel Prize in Physiology or Medicine) at the University of Marburg and University of Heidelberg. Upon his return to the United States, he worked at the New York State Agricultural Experiment Station (part of Cornell University) in Geneva, New York, and then at the University of Michigan before being hired in 1906 by Stephen M. Babcock of the University of Wisconsin to conduct what later came to be known as the "single-grain experiment", which ran from May 1907 to 1911. This experiment entailed a long-term feeding plan using a chemically balanced diet of carbohydrates, fat, and protein instead of single-plant rations as done in Babcock's earlier experiments of 1881 and 1901.

Hart directed the experiment, Babcock provided ideas, and George C. Humphrey oversaw the welfare of the cattle during the experiment. Elmer Verner McCollum, an organic chemist from Connecticut, was hired by Hart to analyze the grain rations and the cow feces. The experiment called for four groups of four heifer calves each, of which three groups were raised and two pregnancies were carried through. The first group ate only wheat, the second group ate only bran, the third group ate only corn, and the last group ate a mixture of the three.

In 1908, it was shown that the corn-fed animals were the most healthy of the group while the wheat-fed groups were the least healthy. All four groups bred during that year, with the corn-fed calves being the healthiest while the wheat and mixed-fed calves were stillborn or later died. Similar results were found in 1909. In 1910, the corn-fed cows had their diets switched to wheat and the non-corn-fed cows were fed wheat. This produced unhealthy calves for the formerly corn-fed cows, while the remaining cows produced healthy calves. When the 1909 formulas were reintroduced to the respective cows in 1911, the same gestation results in 1909 occurred again in 1911. These results were published in 1911. Similar results had been determined in the Dutch East Indies (now Indonesia) in 1901, in Poland in 1910, and in England in 1906 (though the English results were not published until 1912).

Hart later went on during his career to determine in 1917, working with Harry Steenbock, that a possible cause of goitre was iodine deficiency. In 1939, Hart and his associates developed a process that stabilized iodine in table salt, which proved inexpensive and effective in dealing with goiter. He also determined that copper facilitates iron assimilation into the body, leading to a possible therapeutic agent to fight anemia, although its use has never been implemented in medical practice.

Hart retired in 1944 and died in 1953. The Institute of Food Technologists later renamed the Stephen M. Babcock Award (created in 1948) the Babcock-Hart Award in honor of both men's work in improving public health through better nutrition.
