= Biological Chemistry (journal) =

- Discipline: Biochemistry
- Language: English
- Edited by: Bernhard Brüne

Publication details
- Former name(s): Zeitschrift für Physiologische Chemie, Hoppe-Seyler's Zeitschrift für Physiologische Chemie, Biological Chemistry Hoppe-Seyler
- History: 1877–present
- Publisher: W. de Gruyter
- Frequency: Monthly
- Impact factor: 3.268 (2014)

Standard abbreviations
- ISO 4: Biol. Chem.

Indexing
- CODEN: BICHF3
- ISSN: 1431-6730 (print); 1437-4315 (web)
- OCLC no.: 41471850

Links
- Journal homepage

Biological Chemistry is a peer-reviewed scientific journal focusing on biological chemistry. The journal is published by Walter de Gruyter and the current editor-in-chief is Bernhard Brüne.

== History ==
The journal was established by Felix Hoppe-Seyler in 1877, under the name Zeitschrift für Physiologische Chemie (English: Journal of Physiological Chemistry), and was edited by him until his death in 1895. The journal was subsequently renamed Hoppe-Seyler's Zeitschrift für Physiologische Chemie in 1896. Following Hoppe-Seyler, the journal was edited by his student and collaborator, the German biochemist and Nobel laureate Albrecht Kossel, until his death in 1927. In 1985 the journal was renamed as Biological Chemistry Hoppe-Seyler, before obtaining its current title in 1996.

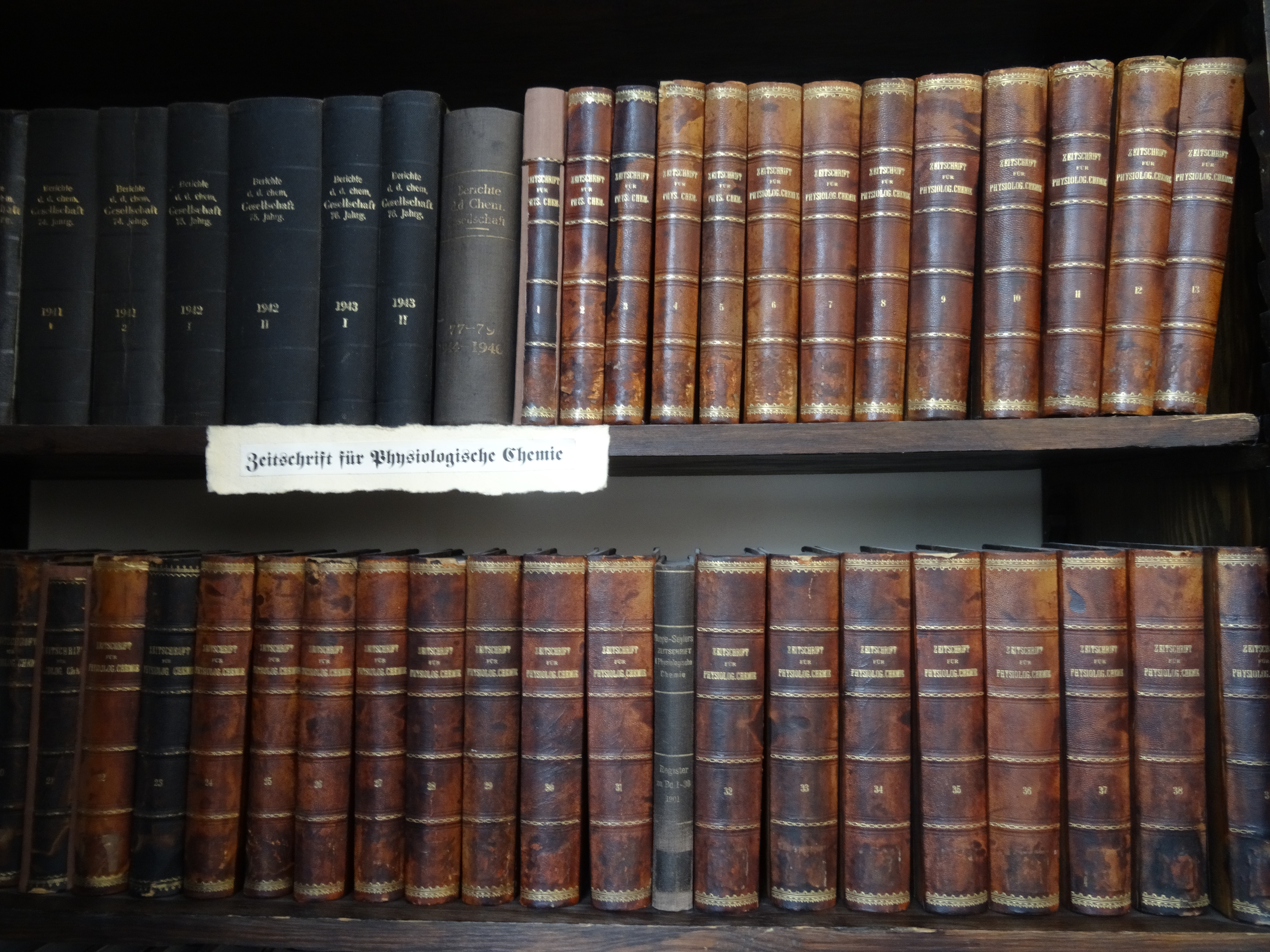
Zeitschrift für Physiologische Chemie

== Abstracting and indexing ==
Biological Chemistry is abstracted and indexed in:

- Academic OneFile
- Biochemistry & Biophysics Citation Index
- Biological Abstracts
- BIOSIS Previews
- CAB Abstracts
- Calcium and Calcified Tissue Abstracts
- Chemical Abstracts
- CSA Illustrata – Natural Sciences
- CSA Neurosciences Abstracts
- Current Contents/Life Sciences
- Elsevier BIOBASE/Current Awareness in Biological Sciences
- EMBASE
- EMBiology
- Index Medicus/MEDLINE
- Reaction Citation Index
- Science Citation Index
- Scopus
- Zoological Record

According to the Journal Citation Reports, the journal has a 2014 impact factor of 3.268, ranking it 106th out of 289 journals in the category "Biochemistry & Molecular Biology".
