= Grand Prix scientifique de la Fondation NRJ =

- Awarded for: Award in the area of neuroscience
- Sponsored by: Institut de France
- Country: France
- Reward: €150,000
- First award: 2000
- Website: fondation.nrj.fr/prix-scientifique.html

Grand Prix scientifique de la Fondation NRJ (The Scientific Grand Prize of the Foundation NRJ) is an award conferred annually by the Foundation NRJ at the Institut de France. It is awarded in the areas of medical science, particularly neuroscience. Each year the prize has a different theme. The award has a €150,000 prize (€130,000 for laboratory research and €20,000 for the laureate).

== Laureates ==
Winners of the prize are:

- 2017: Jean-Yves Delattre
- 2016: Ghislaine Dehaene-Lambertz
- 2015: Mickaël Tanter
- 2014: Jamel Chelly
- 2013: Massimo Zeviani
- 2012: Isabelle Arnulf and Mehdi Tafti
- 2011: Séverine Boillée and Vincent Meininger
- 2010: José A. Esteban and Bruno Dubois
- 2009: Luis Garcia-Larrea and John N. Wood
- 2008: Catherine Lubetzki and Anne Baron-van Vercooren
- 2007: Francis Eustache and Béatrice Desgranges
- 2006: José-Alain Sahel
- 2005: Patrice Tran Ba Huy and Guy Richardson
- 2004: Piotr Topilko
- 2003: Olivier Dulac
- 2002: Antoine Guedeney
- 2001: Catherine Billard-Davou
- 2000: Alain Fischer

== See also ==
- List of medicine awards
