= Sifap =

Pan-European medical study

Sifap ("stroke in young Fabry patients") is a Pan-European study dedicated to investigating the correlation of juvenile stroke and a genetic disorder known as Fabry's disease. It was initiated by University of Rostock, Germany. In recruiting 5,000 patients aged 18 to 55 it will be the largest study on stroke in the young. Approximately 50 study centres from about 15 European countries are participating in the project. The study is divided into two parts: sifap1 and sifap2. Whereas sifap1 analyses the frequency of Fabry disease within the patient cohort, sifap2 controls and investigates the rehabilitation phase of diagnosed Fabry patients.

== Background ==
The goal of the study is to show that Fabry disease has to be considered to be one of the most frequent genetic causes of juvenile stroke. To date the frequency of Fabry disease among general population has been estimated to be around 1:40,000. However, recent investigations have shown that Fabry disease can occur in 1 of 83 stroke patients aged 18–55 and between 1 of 3,500 to 1 of 4,500 individuals of the general population. Sifap aims at scientifically testing and supporting these findings.

== Progress ==
After the proof-of-principle phase (April to December 2007) the official start of the study was January 1, 2008. Sifap1 patients were recruited until June 30, 2009. Sifap2 runs simultaneously, and is scheduled to conclude on June 30, 2012.

== Technique ==
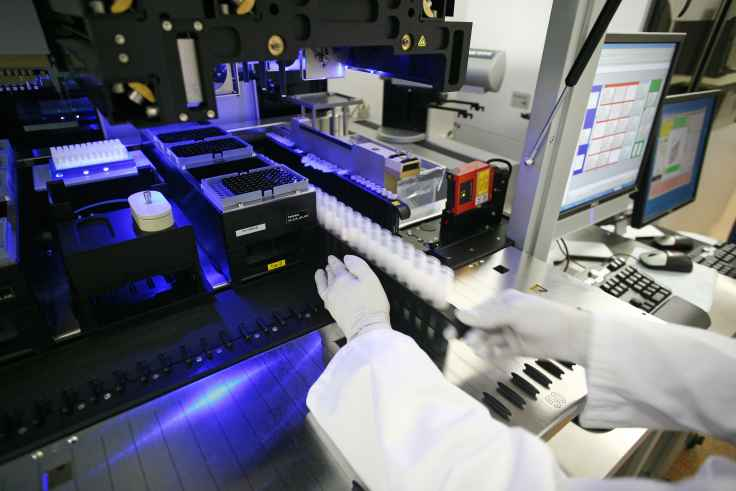
Preparation of the robot for the analysis

One of sifap’s unique characteristics is the fully automated analysis and storage of specimens in combination with the complete digital and web-based data handling. A pipetting robot extracts DNA from specimens and analyses them for Fabry disease. Afterwards, specimens are automatically stored in a biobank and consequently are available for future investigations.

== Committees ==
In order to control, advise and establish professional structures two committees were formed. Publication issues and sifap basics are the responsibility of the steering committee. The nine members are: Miron Ginsberg (Miami, USA), Michael Hennerici (Mannheim, Germany), Christof Kessler (Greifswald, Germany), Edwin Kolodny (New York, USA), Peter Martus (Berlin, Germany), Bo Norrving (Lund, Sweden), Erich-Bernd Ringelstein (Münster, Germany), Peter Rothwell (Oxford, UK) and Graham Vanables (Sheffield, UK) The biobank committee oversees the administration of stored specimens and decides in formal meetings on proposed new projects. The biobank committee consists of: Natan Bornstein (Tel Aviv, Israel), Peter Paul DeDeyn (Antwerp, Belgium), Martin Dichgans (Munich, Germany), Franz Fazekas (Graz, Austria), Hugh Markus (London, UK), Olaf Rieß (Tübingen, Germany) and Arndt Rolfs (Rostock, Germany). Imaging analysis was centrally performed at the Department of Neurology of the Medical University of Graz, coordinated by Franz Fazekas.

== Participating Centres ==
Country	City	Institution
Belgium	Antwerp	Middelheim General Hospital
Belgium	Leuven	UZ Gasthuisburg Hospital
Germany	Altenburg	Kreiskrankenhaus Altenburg
Germany	Bayreuth	Klinikum Hohe Warte
Germany	Berlin	Charité
Germany	Berlin	Klinikum Neukölln
Germany	Bremen	Klinikum Bremen Mitte
Germany	Celle	Allgemeines Krankenhaus Celle
Germany	Chemnitz	Klinikum Chemnitz
Germany	Dresden	Universitätsklinikum Carl Gustav Carus
Germany	Düsseldorf	Heinrich-Heine-Universität
Germany	Frankfurt	Johann-Wolfgang-Goethe-Universität
Germany	Giessen	Universität Giessen
Germany	Greifswald	Ernst-Moritz-Arndt-Universität
Germany	Halle/Saale	Martin-Luther-Universität
Germany	Hamburg	Universitätsklinikum Hamburg-Eppendorf
Germany	Heidelberg	Universität Heidelberg
Germany	Jena	Universitätsklinikum Jena
Germany	Kiel	Universitätsklinikum Schleswig-Holstein
Germany	Leipzig	Universitätsklinikum Leipzig
Germany	Marburg	Universitätsklinikum Giessen und Marburg
Germany	Mühlhausen	Ökumenisches Hainich Klinikum
Germany	Munich	Klinikum München - Großhadern
Germany	Münster	Universitätsklinikum Münster
Germany	Regensburg	Universitätsklinikum Regensburg
Germany	Rostock	Universität Rostock
Germany	Tübingen	Eberhard-Karls-Universität
Germany	Ulm	Universität Ulm
France	Lyon	Hospices Civils de Lyon
Finland	Helsinki	Helsinki University Central Hospital
Georgia	Tbilisi	S.Khechinashvili University
Republic of Ireland	Dublin	The Adelaide and Meath Hospital
Italy	Milan	Ospedale Maggiore Policlinico
Croatia	Zagreb	University Hospital "Sestre Milosrdnice"
Malta	Msida	St. Anne's Clinic
Austria	Graz	Universitätsklinik für Neurologie
Austria	Innsbruck	Universitätsklinik für Neurologie
Austria	Klagenfurt	LKH
Austria	Salzburg	Christian Doppler Klinik
Austria	Vienna	Krankenhaus der Barmherzigen Brüder
Austria	Linz	Wagner-Jauregg Linz
Poland	Warsaw	Institute of Psychiatry and Neurology
Portugal	Lisbon	Hospital de Sao José
Spain	Madrid	Hospital Universitario La Paz
United Kingdom	Glasgow	University of Glasgow
United Kingdom	Oxford	University of Oxford

== Literature ==
- Rolfs et al. "Prevalence of Fabry disease in patients with cryptogenic stroke: a prospective study", The Lancet, Vol 366, 2005
- Spada et al. "High Incidence of Later-Onset Fabry Disease Revealed by Newborn Screening", The American Journal of Human Genetics, Vol 79, 2006
