= Clinical Neurology and Neurosurgery =

- Discipline: Neurology, neurosurgery
- Language: English
- Edited by: Florian Roser

Publication details
- History: 1974-present
- Publisher: Elsevier
- Frequency: Quarterly
- Impact factor: 1.9 (2022)

Standard abbreviations
- ISO 4: Clin. Neurol. Neurosurg.

Indexing
- CODEN: CNNSBV
- ISSN: 0303-8467 (print); 1872-6968 (web)
- LCCN: sn80012342
- OCLC no.: 01188204

Links
- Journal homepage; Online archive

Clinical Neurology and Neurosurgery is a monthly peer-reviewed medical journal covering neurology and neurosurgery. It was established in 1974 and is published by Elsevier. The editor-in-chief is Florian Roser (Cleveland Clinic Abu Dhabi). According to the Journal Citation Reports, the journal has a 2022 impact factor of 1.9.
