= Beau Dick =

Kwakwaka'wakw woodcarver and chief from Canada (1955–2017)

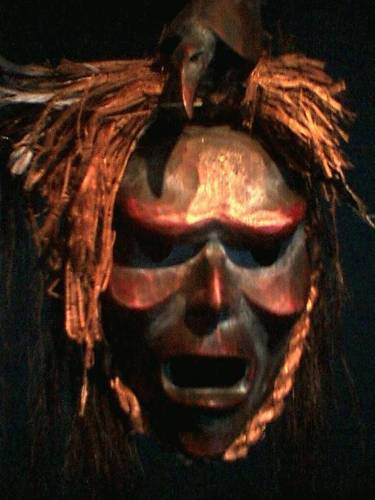
- Mask by Beau Dick
- Born: November 23, 1955; Alert Bay, British Columbia, Canada
- Died: March 27, 2017 (aged 61); British Columbia, Canada
- Citizenship: ʼNamgis First Nation
- Education: apprenticeships
- Known for: woodcarver
- Movement: Northwest Coast art
- Awards: VIVA award (2012)

Beau Dick (November 23, 1955 – March 27, 2017) was a Kwakwaka'wakw Northwest Coast artist and Chief who lived and worked in Alert Bay, British Columbia, Canada. He was a contemporary artist, activist, and hereditary Chief from the ʼNamgis First Nation. Dick was an artist with an extensive national and international exhibition history.

== Early life ==
Beau Dick was born in Kingcome Inlet, BC, a Kwakwaka’wakw village north of Vancouver Island, British Columbia. When Dick was six years old he moved with his family to Vancouver, BC. From a young age, he was heavily influenced by the customary woodcarving of both his grandfather and father. Dick assisted his grandfather and father in carving one of the world's tallest totem poles located in Alert Bay.

== Art career ==
At only 17 years of age Dick was asked to apprentice under artist Tony Hunt in Victoria, BC. Eventually returning to Vancouver, he continued to hone his carving techniques under the influence of Doug Cranmer.

In 1986, Dick was commissioned to carve a mask to be showcased in Expo 86 in Vancouver. The Canadian Museum of History (formerly the Canadian Museum of Civilization) in Gatineau, Quebec, acquired Dick's mask, and it remains on display there. In 1998, he was one of only seven Canadian artists to be invited to the reopening of Canada House in London, England, in the presence of Prime Minister Jean Chretien and Queen Elizabeth II.

His work has been featured in a number of international exhibitions, introducing his pieces to a more contemporary audience. Beau's work was featured alongside that of artist Neil Campbell in the 2004 exhibition Supernatural: Beau Dick and Neil Campbell at the Contemporary Art Gallery in Vancouver, followed by the 2005 "Totems to Turquoise" exhibit in both New York and Vancouver. In 2009, the McMichael Canadian Art Collection showcased Dick's work in their exhibit entitled "Challenging Traditions: Contemporary First Nations Art of the Northwest Coast". Dick participated in the 17th Biennale of Sydney in 2010 and in the Sakahán exhibition at the National Gallery of Canada in Ottawa in the summer of 2013.

== Artistry ==
Dick's work is rooted in Kwakwaka´wakw aesthetics and practices. His craftsmanship and artistry have been noted for being strongly influenced by traditional pieces and techniques, but are particularly unique for their incorporation of contemporary and Western influences. As noted by artist Roy Arden, many of Dick's designs "reminds [me] of Japanese anime characters and commercial Halloween masks... An influence from a European painting, or a Japanese Noh mask, are equally likely to inflect on one of his works."

Dick's masks were created for both ceremonial uses in the communities (to be danced) as well as for collecting. In fact, according to Dick, if the masks are not danced, they are not fully activated. They are living cultural objects. For him, the way light shifts over the surface of the carvings is an integral element of his contemporary aesthetic, as Roy Arden also noted. The activation of the masks in dance makes for interesting conceptual relationships within a gallery installation context and extends conceptual framework of both sculptures and the products of performance.

== Activism ==
On February 10, 2013, Dick performed a First Nations copper-cutting ceremony on the steps of the BC Legislature in Victoria in conjunction with a variety of activists, including local members of Idle No More. Having embarked on a 10-day, 500 km walk from Alert Bay to Victoria, the gesture was intended to bring attention to the abuse of Native treaties by the federal government, as well as highlight the negative repercussions of commercial fish farms on Vancouver Island. A documentary film was made in 2017 by LaTiesha Fazakas and Natalie Boll, titled Maker of Monsters: The Extraordinary Life of Beau Dick, which filmed Dick and other activists during the copper-cutting ceremony, while also examining Dick's artistic practice.

The ceremony was noted as being the first time such a shaming practice had been used by the Kwakwaka'wakw in decades. Beau Dick stated: "The copper is a symbol of justice, truth and balance, and to break one is a threat, a challenge and can be an insult. If you break copper on someone and shame them, there should be an apology."

== Death ==
Dick died on March 27, 2017 months after experiencing a stroke that caused his health to gradually deteriorate. A potlatch, the ceremony for which his art work was often used, was held in his memory at Alert Bay.

== Selected exhibitions ==
- Devoured by Consumerism: Beau Dick solo exhibition White Columns, New York, NY, Remai Modern, Saskatoon, SK, 2019-2020
- Supernatural: Neil Campbell and Beau Dick, Contemporary Art Gallery, Vancouver, 2004
- Totems to Turquoise, New York and Vancouver, 2005
- Challenging Traditions: Contemporary First Nations Art of the Northwest Coast, 2009
- 17th Biennale of Sydney, Sydney, Australia, 2010
- National Gallery of Canada, Sakahàn exhibition, 2013
- "The Box of Treasures: Gifts from the Supernatural, The Bill Reid Gallery, Vancouver BC", 2015
- Lalakenis/All Directions: A Journey of Truth and Unity, Morris and Helen Belkin Art Gallery, 2016
- "Learning From Athens, documenta 14, Athens GR and Kassel DE", 2017

== Awards ==
Dick received the 2012 VIVA award.
