= Albrecht Kossel =

German biochemist and pioneer in the study of genetics

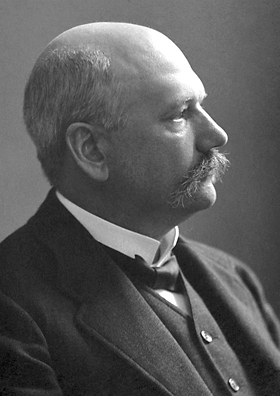
- Albrecht Kossel
- Born: Ludwig Karl Martin Leonhard Albrecht Kossel; 16 September 1853; Rostock, Grand Duchy of Mecklenburg-Schwerin in the German Confederation
- Died: 5 July 1927 (aged 73); Heidelberg in the Weimar Republic
- Education: University of Strassburg; University of Rostock
- Known for: Discovery of histidine Discovery of histones Discovery of nucleobases Discovery of agmatine Discovery of Theophylline
- Children: 3, including Walther Kossel
- Awards: Nobel Prize in Physiology or Medicine (1910)
- Scientific career
- Fields: Biochemistry, genetics
- Doctoral students: Edwin B. Hart

Ludwig Karl Martin Leonhard Albrecht Kossel (German pronunciation: [ˈalbʁɛçt ˈkɔsl̩]; 16 September 1853 – 5 July 1927) was a German biochemist and pioneer in the study of genetics. He was awarded the Nobel Prize for Physiology or Medicine in 1910 for his work in determining the chemical composition of nucleic acids, the genetic substance of biological cells.

Kossel isolated and described the five organic compounds that are present in nucleic acid: adenine, cytosine, guanine, thymine, and uracil. These compounds were later shown to be nucleobases, and are key in the formation of DNA and RNA, the genetic material found in all living cells.

Kossel was an important influence on and collaborator with other important researchers in biochemistry, including Henry Drysdale Dakin, Friedrich Miescher, Edwin B. Hart, and his professor and mentor, Felix Hoppe-Seyler. Kossel was editor of the Zeitschrift für Physiologische Chemie (Journal of Physiological Chemistry) from 1895 until his death. Kossel also conducted important research into the composition of protein, and his research predicted the discovery of the polypeptide nature of the protein molecule.

The Albrecht Kossel Institute for Neuroregeneration at the University of Rostock is named in his honor.

== Early life and education ==
Kossel was born in Rostock, Germany as the son of the merchant and Prussian consul Albrecht Karl Ludwig Enoch Kossel and his wife Clara Jeppe Kossel. As a youth, Kossel attended the Gymnasium at Rostock, where he evidenced substantial interest in chemistry and botany.

In 1872, Kossel attended the University of Strassburg to study medicine. He studied under Felix Hoppe-Seyler, who was head of the department of biochemistry, the only such institution in Germany at the time. He attended lectures by Anton de Bary, Waldeyer, August Kundt, and Baeyer. He completed his studies at University of Rostock, and passed his German medical license exam in 1877.

== Early research and collaboration ==
After completing his university studies, Kossel returned to the University of Strassburg as research assistant to Felix Hoppe-Seyler. At the time, Hoppe-Seyler was intensely interested in research concerning an acidic substance that had first been chemically isolated from pus cells by one of his former students, Friedrich Miescher, in 1869. Unlike protein, the substance contained considerable amounts of phosphorus, but with its high acidity, it was unlike any cellular substance that had yet been observed.

Kossel showed that the substance, called "nuclein", consisted of a protein component and a non-protein component. Kossel further isolated and described the non-protein component. This substance has become known as nucleic acid, which contains the genetic information found in all living cells.

== Isolation and description of nucleobases ==
In 1883, Kossel left Strassburg to become Director of the Chemistry Division of the Physiological Institute at the University of Berlin. In this post, he succeeded Eugen Baumann and worked under the supervision of Emil du Bois-Reymond.

Kossel continued his previous work on the nucleic acids. During the period 1885 to 1901, he was able to isolate and name its five constituent organic compounds: adenine, cytosine, guanine, thymine, and uracil. These compounds are now known collectively as nucleobases, and they provide the molecular structure necessary in the formation of stable DNA and RNA molecules.

== Research into the chemical composition of protein ==
In 1895, Kossel was professor of physiology as well as director of the Physiological Institute at the University of Marburg. Around this time, he began investigations into the chemical composition of proteins, the alterations in proteins during transformation into peptone, the peptide components of cells, and other investigations.

In 1896, Kossel discovered histidine, then worked out the classical method for the quantitative separation of the "hexone bases" (the alpha-amino acids arginine, histidine, agmatine and lysine). He was also the first to isolate theophylline, a therapeutic drug found naturally in tea and cocoa beans.

In 1901, Kossel was named to a similar post at Heidelberg University, and became director of the Heidelberg Institute for Protein Investigation. His research predicted the discovery of the polypeptide nature of the protein molecule.

== Nobel prize ==
The processes of life are like a drama, and I am studying the actors, not the plot. There are many actors, and it is their characters which make this drama. I seek to understand their habits, their peculiarities.

— Albrecht Kossel, The New York Times interview

Kossel was awarded the Nobel Prize in Physiology or Medicine in 1910 for his research in cell biology, the chemical composition of the cell nucleus, and for his work in isolating and describing nucleic acids. The award was presented on 10 December 1910.

In the autumn of 1911, Kossel was invited to the United States to deliver the Herter Lecture at Johns Hopkins. Traveling with his wife Luise and daughter Gertrude, he took the opportunity to travel and to visit acquaintances, one of which was Eugene W. Hilgard, professor emeritus of agricultural chemistry at the University of California at Berkeley, who was also his wife's cousin. He also visited and delivered lectures at several other universities, including the University of Chicago.

On the occasion of his visit to New York City, Kossel was interviewed by a reporter from The New York Times. Kossel's English was reportedly very good, and his self-effacing modesty is voluminously mentioned in the reporter's account.

His Herter lecture at Johns Hopkins was titled, "The Proteins". This was the only time Kossel ever visited the United States.

== Later research and collaboration ==
With his distinguished English pupil Henry Drysdale Dakin, Kossel investigated arginase, the ferment which hydrolyses arginine into urea and ornithine. Later, he discovered agmatine in herring roe and devised a method for preparing it.

Another of Kossel's students was American biochemist Edwin B. Hart, who would later return to the United States to participate in the "Single-grain experiment" (1907–1911) and be part of research teams that would determine the nutritive causes of anemia and goiter. Another was Otto Folin, an American chemist who discovered Phosphocreatine.

In 1923, Kossel was honored by being named Germany's representative to the Eleventh Physiological Congress in Edinburgh, Scotland. When he appeared before the assembled scientists, they gave him an ovation that lasted several minutes. At the congress, he was conferred an honorary degree by the University of Edinburgh.

In 1924, Kossel became professor emeritus, but continued to lecture at Heidelberg University. In April 1927, he attended the Lister Centenary Celebration held in England.

During the last years of Kossel's life, he conducted important research into the composition of the protein types protamines and histones, and introduced flavianic acid for the quantitative separation of arginine, histidine and lysine in proteins. A monograph describing this work was published shortly after his death.

== Zeitschrift für Physiologische Chemie ==
Kossel contributed to early issues of the Zeitschrift für Physiologische Chemie (Journal of Physiological Chemistry). This publication was founded by his professor and mentor, Felix Hoppe-Seyler, in 1877, the same year that Kossel started work as his research assistant. After Hoppe-Seyler's death in 1895, Kossel took over editorship of the Zeitschrift and continued in that role until his own death in 1927.

== Personal life ==
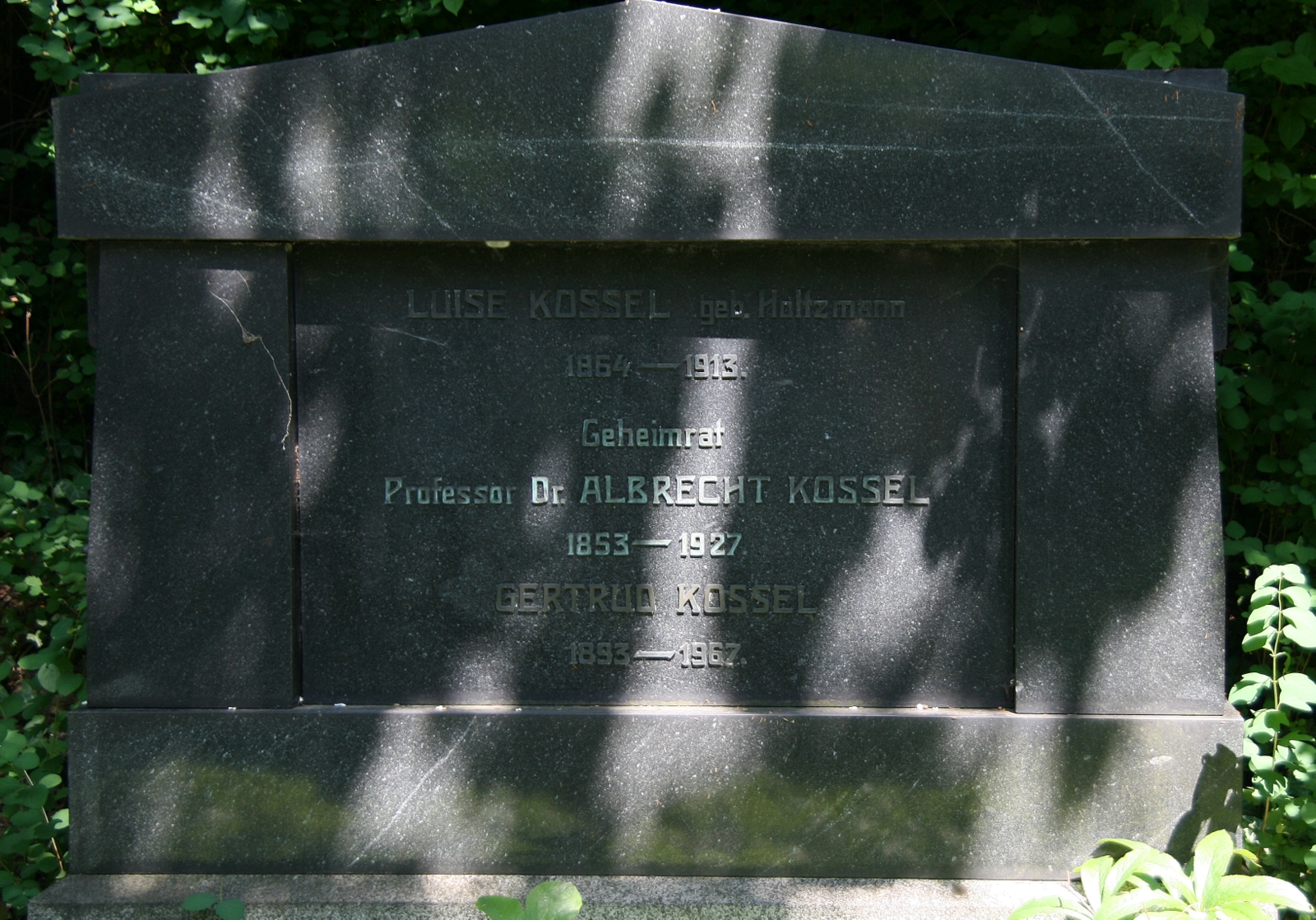
Kossel's grave in Heidelberg

In 1886, Kossel married Luise Holtzman, daughter of Adolf Holtzmann. Holtzmann was Professor at the University of Heidelberg, lecturing in German literature as well as Sanskrit. He was also a noted philologist of his day. The couple had three children, two of whom survived to maturity: Walther, born in 1888, and daughter Gertrude, born in 1889.

Son Walther Kossel (1888–1956) became a prominent physicist and was professor of theoretical physics and director of the Physics Institute at the University of Tübingen. He is known for his theory of the chemical bond (ionic bond/octet rule), the Sommerfeld–Kossel displacement law, and other achievements.

Albrecht Kossel was apparently not greatly interested in politics, but in 1914 he did not sign the propaganda Pronunciamento of German professors at the start of the war. He suffered under the lies which filled the world in war time. In 1917 Kossel was summoned by the government to pronounce that the allotted food provisions were sufficient. He refused this demand, would never declare untruths as truths

Through his marriage to Luise, Kossel was related to several prominent Americans, including soil science pioneer Eugene W. Hilgard, journalist and financier Henry Villard, and abolitionist William Lloyd Garrison.

Luise Kossel died in 1913 of acute pancreatitis. Kossel died quietly on 5 July 1927, after a recurring attack of angina pectoris. He is buried in Heidelberg, Germany.

== Legacy ==
The study of the living organism has more and more led to the view that its smallest independent units morphologically speaking – the cells – also to a certain degree lead an independent life and are the real seats of the vital processes. The cells therefore attract special attention in biological research, and studies which widen our knowledge of the cells to any important extent deserve to be given prominence. Prof. Kossel has chosen to devote himself to this field of research, and it is for his work in this respect that the Nobel Prize has been awarded to him this year.

— Nobel Prize Introduction Speech, December 10, 1910

Albrecht Kossel is considered one of the great scientists of biochemistry and genetics. By isolating and defining nucleic acid and the nucleobases, he provided the necessary precursors that led to the double-helix model of DNA, diffraction photographed by Rosalind Franklin, further devised by James D. Watson and Francis Crick in 1953.

In the Nobel Prize introduction speech, his elucidation of the chemical nature of components of nucleic acids and chromatin was highlighted as a major contribution to biochemistry.

The Albrecht Kossel Institute for Neuroregeneration at the University of Rostock is named in his honor.

== Selected works ==
- Untersuchungen über die Nukleine und ihre Spaltungsprodukte ("Investigations into the nucleins and their cleavage products", 1881)
- Die Gewebe des menschlichen Körpers und ihre mikroskopische Untersuchung ("The tissues in the human body and their microscopic investigation", 1889–1891)
- Leitfaden für medizinisch-chemische Kurse ("Textbook for medical-chemical courses", 1888)
- Die Probleme der Biochemie ("The problems of biochemistry", 1908)
- Die Beziehungen der Chemie zur Physiologie ("The relationships between chemistry and physiology", 1913)
