= Alan Thompson (neurologist) =

Professor Alan Thompson FMedSci FRCP FRCPI
- Born: Alan J Thompson; Ireland
- Education: Trinity College Dublin (1979)
- Known for: neurological research, multiple sclerosis, rehabilitation research
- Awards: John Dystel Prize for Multiple Sclerosis Research 2017
- Scientific career
- Workplaces: University College London
- Doctoral advisor: Michael Hutchinson

Alan J. Thompson is Dean of the Faculty of Brain Sciences at UCL; Pro-Provost for London at UCL; Garfield Weston Professor of Clinical Neurology and Neurorehabilitation at the UCL Queen Square Institute of Neurology. He is also a consultant neurologist at the University College London NHS Hospitals Foundation Trust working at the National Hospital for Neurology and Neurosurgery. He is Editor-in-Chief for Multiple Sclerosis Journal.

== Career ==
He studied medicine at Trinity College Dublin, graduating in 1979. He subsequently trained in neurology at St Vincent’s/Adelaide Hospital, Dublin, gaining an MD under the supervision of Professor Michael Hutchinson; and at the Royal London Hospital, and in neurology and neurorehabilitation at Queen Square’s National Hospital for Neurology and Neurosurgery in London. He was the clinical director of the National Hospital for Neurology and Neurosurgery between 2003 and 2007. Between 2014 and 2020, he was Chair of the Neuroscience Academic Medical Centre for the UCLPartners Academic Health Science Centre. He was elected a Fellow of the Academy of Medical Sciences in 2015. He is an Emeritus Senior Investigator at the National Institute for Health Research (NIHR).

== Research ==
His main area of expertise is in the diagnosis, evaluation, and management of progressive forms of multiple sclerosis. His work focuses on the pathological mechanisms that underpin neurological disability, and on recovery through neurorehabilitation. He has published widely in high quality research journals and has an H Index of 133 (Google Scholar) or 119 (Web of Science; Research ID C-2654-2008).

== Awards ==
In 2017 he was awarded the John Dystel Prize for Multiple Sclerosis Research by the American Academy of Neurology National Multiple Sclerosis Society and the National Multiple Sclerosis Society (USA).

In 2018 he was awarded the Lifetime Achievement Award by the Consortium of Multiple Sclerosis Centers (USA).

In 2020 he was awarded the Sobek Prize by the German National MS Society and the MS Society of Baden-Württemberg.

In 2021 he was awarded the Charcot Award for outstanding lifetime research into MS by the International Federation for MS.
