= Transfersome =

Transfersome is a proprietary drug delivery technology, an artificial vesicle designed to exhibit the characteristics of a cell vesicle suitable for controlled and potentially targeted drug delivery. Some evidence has shown efficacy for its use for drug delivery without causing skin irritation, potentially being used to treat skin cancer. Transfersome is made by the German company IDEA AG.
