= Fazekas Mihály Gymnasium (Debrecen) =

High school in Debrecen, Hungary

Coordinates: 47°31′48″N 21°37′04″E

The Mihály Fazekas Gymnasium (Hungarian: Fazekas Mihály Gimnázium; also known among alumni as simply Fazekas) is a gymnasium high school in Debrecen, Hungary.

Its original institution, the Debrecen szabad királyi város Főreáltanodája was opened on November 3, 1873. At that time it was a boys only school, its main topics were modern languages, mathematics and natural sciences. Its building was designed by Károly Meixner and was started in 1891 and in 1893 its gates opened for the students.

The name "Fazekas Mihály" was adopted in 1922, and it became a high school in 1934, when the education system was standardised. Since then the institution showed strong results in real science education.

Between 1956 and 1961 the school lost many of its status as being training school for the Debrecen University and became more polytechnics style. In 1961 the system was changed back to the old system, including educating teachers, special maths and foreign languages, and the school became co-educated as it was opened for girl students, too.

Since 2000 the high school started unique dual-language classes in Hungarian-Spanish and Hungarian-French languages.
