= Franz Fazekas =

Austrian neurologist

Franz Fazekas (born 1956) is an Austrian neurologist and former head of the department of neurology at the Medical University of Graz.

== Career ==
Fazekas studied medicine at the faculty of medicine of the University of Graz and completed his studies in 1980. Afterwards, he started his residency at the department of neurology and psychiatry of the university hospital of Graz. Fazekas received a Fulbright scholarship in 1985 and spent a two-year research stay at the University of Pennsylvania.

Fazekas received his habilitation in 1989 and was made full professor of neurology in 2005. In 2008 he become head of the department of Neurology at the Medical University of Graz.

Fazekas was president of the Austrian Stroke Society from 2004 to 2006 and president of the Austrian Society of Neurology from 2006 to 2008. In 2018 Fazekas was elected president of the European Academy of Neurology for a two-year term.

== Scientific expertise ==
The scientific focus of Fazekas is neuroimaging using magnetic resonance imaging, multiple sclerosis, stroke, and dementia. Fazekas suggested a scale to grade white-matter hyperintensities, which was later named the Fazekas scale and is used worldwide in neurology and neuroradiology. Additionally, Fazekas is one of the first researchers who suggested MRT-based criteria for the diagnosis of multiple sclerosis. Fazekas is the author of more than 500 articles in scientific journals and was an editorial board member of several high-impact scientific journals: Neurology, Stroke, and Multiple Sclerosis Journal.
