= Maker of Monsters: The Extraordinary Life of Beau Dick =

2017 documentary film

Maker of Monsters: The Extraordinary Life of Beau Dick, is a 2017 documentary film about Kwakwaka'wakw artist and activist Beau Dick. Written, directed, and produced by curator, author, and filmmaker LaTiesha Fazakas and actor, producer and co-director Natalie Boll, the film features Dick and other activists copper-cutting ceremony and examines Dick's artistic practice.

== Background ==
Fazakas first met Dick in 2000 in Vancouver, Canada while she was working at a commercial gallery. After meeting a director and producer who walked into the gallery and inquired about Northwest Coast mythology and culture, Fazakas introduced them to Beau Dick due to his knowledge on the subject. Through working with the filmmakers, Fazakas had the idea of creating a documentary about the artist.

== Description ==
The film follows Dick as he performs a First Nations copper-cutting ceremony on the steps of the British Columbia Legislature in Victoria in conjunction with a variety of activists, including local members of Idle No More. Having embarked on a 10-day, 500 km walk from Alert Bay to Victoria, the gesture was intended to bring attention to the abuse of Native treaties by the federal government, as well as highlight the negative repercussions of commercial fish farms on Vancouver Island. Maker of Monsters also explains how the Canadian government banned Potlatch.

The film shows Dick working within ancient traditions, and discusses how he rose to the ranks of international success within the world of contemporary art. Fazakas asserts in the documentary: "Anyone that has encountered a piece of Beau's, immediately has an emotional reaction to it". It also features numerous interviews with Dick while he reflects on his mask carving and his experiences growing up.

The film features science broadcaster and environmental activist David Suzuki, and artists Bruce Alfred, Wayne Alfred, Rande Cook, Roy Arden, Corey Bulpitt, Dana Claxton, among others.

The film was an Athene Films production co-directed by Natalie Boll and Latiesha Fazakas and produced by Natalie Boll, Latiesha Fazakas and Randall Perry.

== Critical reception ==
The film made its world premiere at the 2017 Vancouver International Film Festival.

Pat Mullen, online co-editor of Point of View Magazine, and member of the Toronto Film Critics Association noted: "A chisel here and a chainsaw swipe there bring these masks to fruition as Dick scatters wood chips all over the floor and cuts through the legacy of colonialism in Canada by making visible the heritage of his people and culture. This aspect of the film is where Maker of Monsters excels. Dick’s masks are simply stunning works of art and they’re perfectly tailored to the screen."

== Awards and nominations ==
- Won Victoria Film Festival Cultural Currents Award in 2018
