= Multiple Sclerosis Journal =

- Discipline: Multiple sclerosis
- Language: English
- Edited by: Alan J Thompson

Publication details
- Former name: Multiple Sclerosis
- History: 1995-present
- Publisher: SAGE Publications
- Frequency: Monthly
- Impact factor: 5.855 (2021)

Standard abbreviations
- ISO 4: Mult. Scler. J.

Indexing
- CODEN: MUSCFZ
- ISSN: 1352-4585 (print); 1477-0970 (web)
- LCCN: 96039038
- OCLC no.: 39932110

Links
- Journal homepage; Online access; Online archive

The Multiple Sclerosis Journal (formerly Multiple Sclerosis) is a monthly peer-reviewed medical journal covering the clinical neurology of multiple sclerosis. The editor-in-chief is Alan J Thompson (University College London). It was established in 1995 and is published by SAGE Publications.

== Abstracting and indexing ==
The journal is abstracted and indexed in:

- Biological Abstracts
- BIOSIS
- Current Contents
- EMBASE
- Excerpta Medica
- Elsevier BIOBASE
- Current Awareness in Biological Sciences
- EMBASE
- Excerpta Medica
- Index Medicus/MEDLINE
- Science Citation Index Expanded
- Scopus

According to the Journal Citation Reports, its 2021 impact factor is 5.855, ranking it 40 out of 212 journals in the category "Clinical Neurology".

== History ==
The journal was first established in 1995 with Ingrid Allen (Queen's University Belfast) as founding editor. Four issues appeared in 1995, eight in 1996, and from 1997 seven or eight issues appeared each year until 2006. In 2007 there were nine issues and in 2009, the current monthly publication was established. Donald Silverberg took over the editorship of the journal. He retired in 2006 and was succeeded by Alan J Thompson.
