= DeLuca =

Origin
- Language: Italian

Other names
- Variant forms: Deluca, De Luca

DeLuca, also spelled Deluca or De Luca, is an Italian-language surname.

Notable people and characters with the surname include:

== People ==
- Adrian Deluca (born 1982), Australian rules footballer
- Alby De Luca (1908–1978), Australian rules footballer
- Anthony DeLuca (disambiguation), various people
- Antonio De Luca (bishop) (born 1956), Italian Catholic bishop
- Augusto De Luca (born 1955), Italian photographer
- Ben DeLuca (born 1998), American football player
- Dan DeLuca (born 1970), American actor
- Dominic DeLuca (born 2002), American football player
- Eduardo Deluca, Argentinian football administrator
- Fabian Deluca (born 1987), Australian rules footballer
- Frank Deluca (1898–1967), Italian-American mobster and brother of Joseph DeLuca
- Fred DeLuca (1947–2015), American businessman and co-founder of the Subway franchise of sandwich restaurants
- George DeLuca (1889–1983), American lawyer, banker and politician
- Giorgio DeLuca, American businessman, a founder of the gourmet grocery store Dean & DeLuca
- Giuseppe De Luca (1876–1950), Italian baritone
- Hector DeLuca, American biochemist and professor
- Jacqueline Frank DeLuca (born 1980), American water polo goalkeeper
- Joe DeLuca (1932–2013), Canadian football player
- John DeLuca (born 1986), American actor
- Jonny DeLuca (born 1998), American baseball player
- Joseph Deluca (1893–1952), Italian-American mobster
- Josh Deluca (born 1996), Australian rules footballer
- Louis DeLuca (1933–2023), American businessman and Connecticut state senator
- Maura DeLuca, American activist and political candidate
- Michael De Luca (born 1965), American film producer and screenwriter
- Nick De Luca (born 1984), Scottish rugby union player
- Nick DeLuca (born 1995), American footballer
- Rob De Luca, American rock bass guitarist
- Rocco DeLuca (born 1975), leader and guitarist of the now-disbanded indie rock band Rocco DeLuca and the Burden
- Ryan DeLuca, founder of Bodybuilding.com
- Sam DeLuca (1936–2011), American Football League lineman
- Stefanie DeLuca, American sociologist
- Vincenzo De Luca (born 1949), Italian politician and president of Campania

== Fictional characters ==
- Andrew DeLuca, from the medical drama television series Grey's Anatomy
- Detective Achille De Luca, from Inspector De Luca (TV series), an Italian TV police drama
- Kit DeLuca, from the movie Pretty Woman, portrayed by Laura San Giacomo
- Maria DeLuca, in the Roswell High book series and the TV series Roswell

== See also ==
- Inspector De Luca (disambiguation)
- Dean & DeLuca, upscale grocery store
- Luca (disambiguation)
- De Lucas (surname)
