= Luca (surname) =

Luca, De Luca, and Di Luca are common Italian surnames, derived from the Latin name Lucas.

Notable people with these names include:

- Anthony M. DeLuca, Democratic member of the Pennsylvania House of Representatives
- Cateno De Luca, Italian politician
- Ciro de Luca, Austrian comedian and actor
- Danilo Di Luca, Italian cyclist
- Erri De Luca, Italian author
- Fănică Luca, Romanian musician
- Frank Deluca, Italian-American mobster
- Chiara de Luca, French-Italian actress
- Danilo Di Luca, Italian professional road racing cyclist
- Fred De Luca, US-American entrepreneur
- George DeLuca, American lawyer, banker and politician
- Gherasim Luca, Romanian poet and painter
- Giorgio DeLuca, American entrepreneur
- Giuseppe de Luca, Italian baritone
- Guerrino De Luca, Italian-American entrepreneur
- Jeff De Luca, American software developer
- Joseph Deluca, Italian-American mobster
- Libero de Luca, Swiss tenor
- Loes Luca, Dutch actress and comedian
- Marco De Luca, Italian race walker
- Massimo De Luca, Italian futsal player
- Massimo Luca, Italian musician
- Michael De Luca, American movie producer and screenwriter
- Mimmo Lucà (1953–2025), Italian politician
- Nathalie Luca, French sociologist of religion
- Nick De Luca, Scottish rugby union player
- Nick DeLuca, American football player
- Olmstead Luca, Americo-Liberian composer
- Roxana Luca, Romanian figure skater
- Vasile Luca, Romanian politician

== See also ==
- Luca (given name)
- Luca (disambiguation)
- DeLuca (surname)
- Lucca (surname)
