= Henry Mall Historic District =

Historic district in Wisconsin, United States

- U.S. National Register of Historic Places
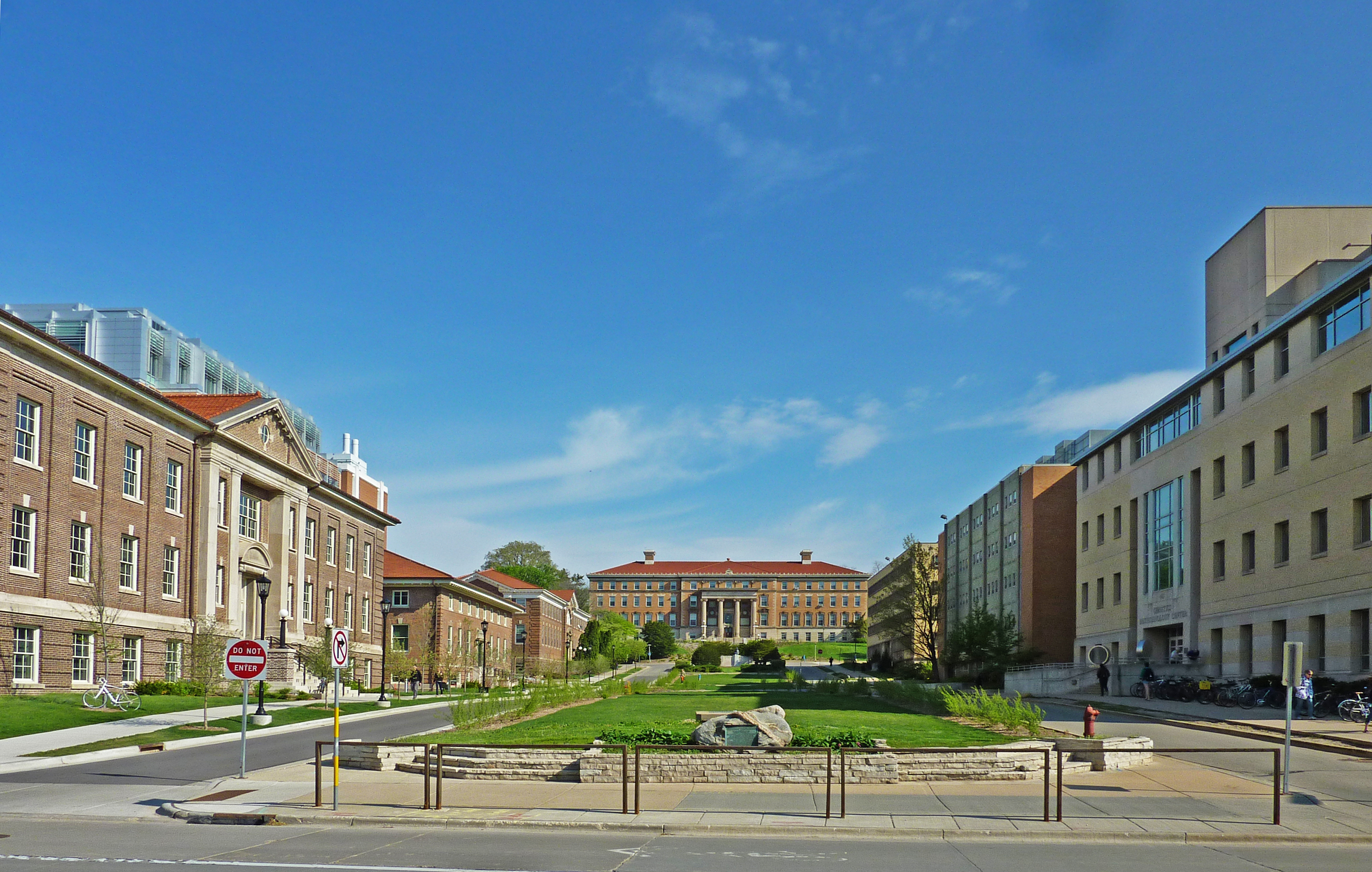
- Looking up Henry Mall from University Ave. Buildings are, left to right: Ag Chemistry, Agronomy, Ag Engineering, Ag Hall, the Stovall Lab, Genetics, and the Biotechnology Center.
- Location: 420, 425, 440, 445, 460 and 465 Henry Mall and 1450 Linden Dr., Madison, Wisconsin
- Coordinates: 43.07429°N 89.41032°W
- Area: 8 acres (3.2 ha)
- Built: 1903
- NRHP reference No.: 91001986
- Added to NRHP: January 22, 1992

The Henry Mall Historic District is a landscaped mall and the surrounding academic agriculture buildings on the University of Wisconsin–Madison campus, roughly laid out by architects Warren Laird and Paul Cret from 1906 to 1908, with buildings constructed from 1903 to 1961. In 1992 the district was added to the National Register of Historic Places.

== History ==
The University of Wisconsin was created on paper in 1848, the same year that Wisconsin became a state. In 1850, before any building, a UW architect envisioned a mall running down the hill that would later be called Bascom Hill. The UW's oldest building, North Hall was built in 1851 near the top of that mall, and for fifty years most of the UW's construction was along the Bascom Hill mall.

The UW curriculum initially focused on geography, English grammar, Latin and Greek. Chancellor Lathrop endorsed agricultural education already in 1851, but the state legislature didn't fund it. In 1857 Michigan did start a college of agriculture, and Iowa followed in 1858. After the Morrill Act of 1862 opened the possibility of land-grant funding, the legislature in 1866 expanded the UW's charge to include industrial and agricultural education and created a professorship of agriculture and chemistry. The Regents bought a 195-acre farm on what was then the west side of campus, where "agriculture is to be practically taught by experimenting on different soils and location of the land..." (That farm on the west end of campus is now very citified - the site of many of the UW's ag buildings.) A school of agriculture was established in 1868 with a three-year degree, but the courses were mostly general science courses, and students were few.

Finally in 1880 a professorship was created devoted solely to agriculture, and William A. Henry was appointed. "A man of great energy, a vigorous correspondent, an active and effective publicist, Henry worked closely with the farm leaders of Wisconsin and the farmer's associations, seeking to find out what the farmers wanted from the department and trying to devise the means of giving it to them." Henry procured the first grant from the legislature to study a new agricultural venture - the cultivation of various kinds of sugar cane and manufacture of syrup and sugar from it. He got another grant to fund the university farm, which was renamed the Experiment Station. Under Henry's guidance, the UW began offering two-day farmer's institutes, which discussed the best agricultural practices with farmers, and in 1886 started the 12-week winter short course for farmers - a new idea that hadn't been tried elsewhere. More practical research was done by the Ag department, including exploration of round silos, barn ventilation, soil problems, use of insecticides, development of plum varieties for Wisconsin's climate, the effects of different feeds (including the new silage) on animal growth and milk production, Professor Stephen Babcock's standardized butterfat test, a better understanding of how cheese can be made, and testing for bovine tuberculosis.

As the Agriculture department grew, it needed its own space. In 1884 the Agriculture department was housed in South Hall on Bascom Hill, and the hall was renamed Agriculture Hall for a time. By this time the Bascom Hill mall was largely full, so new buildings were constructed in other areas. In 1890 the UW added a modest wooden dairy building, probably near the Horse Barn. That first Dairy building was replaced in 1892 by Hiram Smith Hall. The Horticulture and Agricultural Physics building was added in 1894 and 1896, on that farm a half mile west of Bascom Mall. The Dairy Barn was added in 1897. In 1903 Agriculture Hall was added a quarter mile west of Bascom Mall, a three-story Neoclassical-styled building designed by J.T.W. Jennings. The classical styling was a change from the previous ag buildings, which had mostly been in Tudor Revival style.

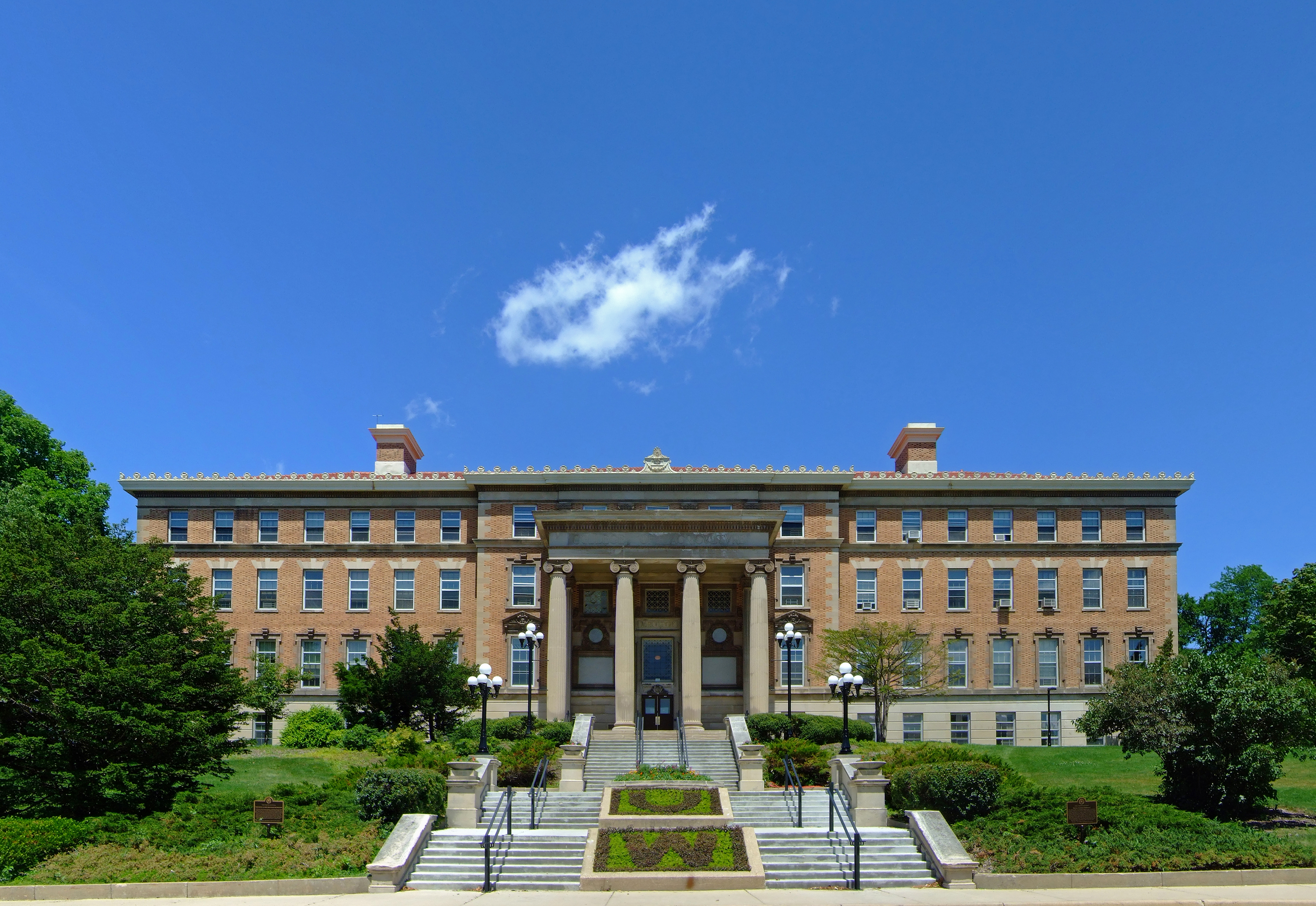
Agriculture Hall, 1903

The turn of the century was a time of great expansion at the UW, and with the Bascom Hill mall filled, buildings were going up here and there in various styles. If this continued, some regents were concerned that the campus would become an ugly hodgepodge of styles sprawled out in a way that would make students frequently walk a mile between classes. So in 1906 they hired Warren P. Laird and Paul Philippe Cret to work with Arthur Peabody, the campus's supervising architect, to draw up a master plan for future construction at the Madison campus. Laird was a professor of architecture at the University of Pennsylvania. Cret was a French-born architect teaching at the same university. The three began working on the plan, with Peabody and Charles Van Hise acting as liaisons between the Pennsylvanians and the UW. Some goals of the plan were saccharine, like "Improvement of the Main Campus," but others influenced Henry Mall, like "Creation of a monumental centre" and "Grouping of Departments by affinity as far as practicable within existing conditions."

In 1907 Cret produced a preliminary study that contains the germ of the idea for Henry Mall. He wrote:

The ensemble, formed by the Agricultural Building at the head, on one side by Agricultural Engineering, Agronomy and the proposed building for Agricultural Chemistry and Bacteriology and on the other side by the future Men's Dormitories, is, however, incomplete, if the fourth side is an unsightly fence surrounding the athletic field and placed in an oblique direction with regard to the axis of the ensemble. It seems that this group of buildings could be made very beautiful and comparable only to one of which Bascom Hill is the focus, if fourth side were formed by the imposing mass of the new Gymnasium, preceded by an approach arranged as a Court of Honor with a flag pole in the center. The slope of 50 ft. between the Agricultural Building and the new Gymnasium is graded naturally and allows a full view of the mall, 150 feet wide and more than 900 feet in length.

Laird presented a more developed draft plan in 1908, covering most of the UW. The departments around Henry Mall area, then called the Lesser Mall, were conceived to be "technical," geographically close to both the pure science departments to the east and the university farm to the west. While many of the buildings on the Bascom Hill mall were roughly Italianate and clad in sandstone, the buildings around Henry Mall would be roughly Neoclassical, clad in brick with limestone trim, following the lead of the already-built 1903 Agriculture Hall. The regents approved this plan, and the UW began acquiring the land around Henry Mall. Laird and Cret were further hired to design some of the buildings around the mall.

== Buildings ==
Here are the buildings and structures around the mall, in the order built. They are contributing properties to the district unless noted otherwise:

- 1903 Agriculture Hall at 1450 Linden Dr is a Beaux Arts-style building designed by J.T.W. Jennings. Ag Hall was built before there was a plan for Henry Mall, but Henry Mall was designed around it, with Ag Hall at its head. When it was built, Ag Hall became the main building of the College of Agriculture, and most of college was housed there until departments expanded into their own buildings. In the early years it housed Agricultural Economics (the first such department in the U.S.), Bacteriology, Veterinary Science, the Wisconsin State Lab of Hygiene, Genetics and Poultry Science.

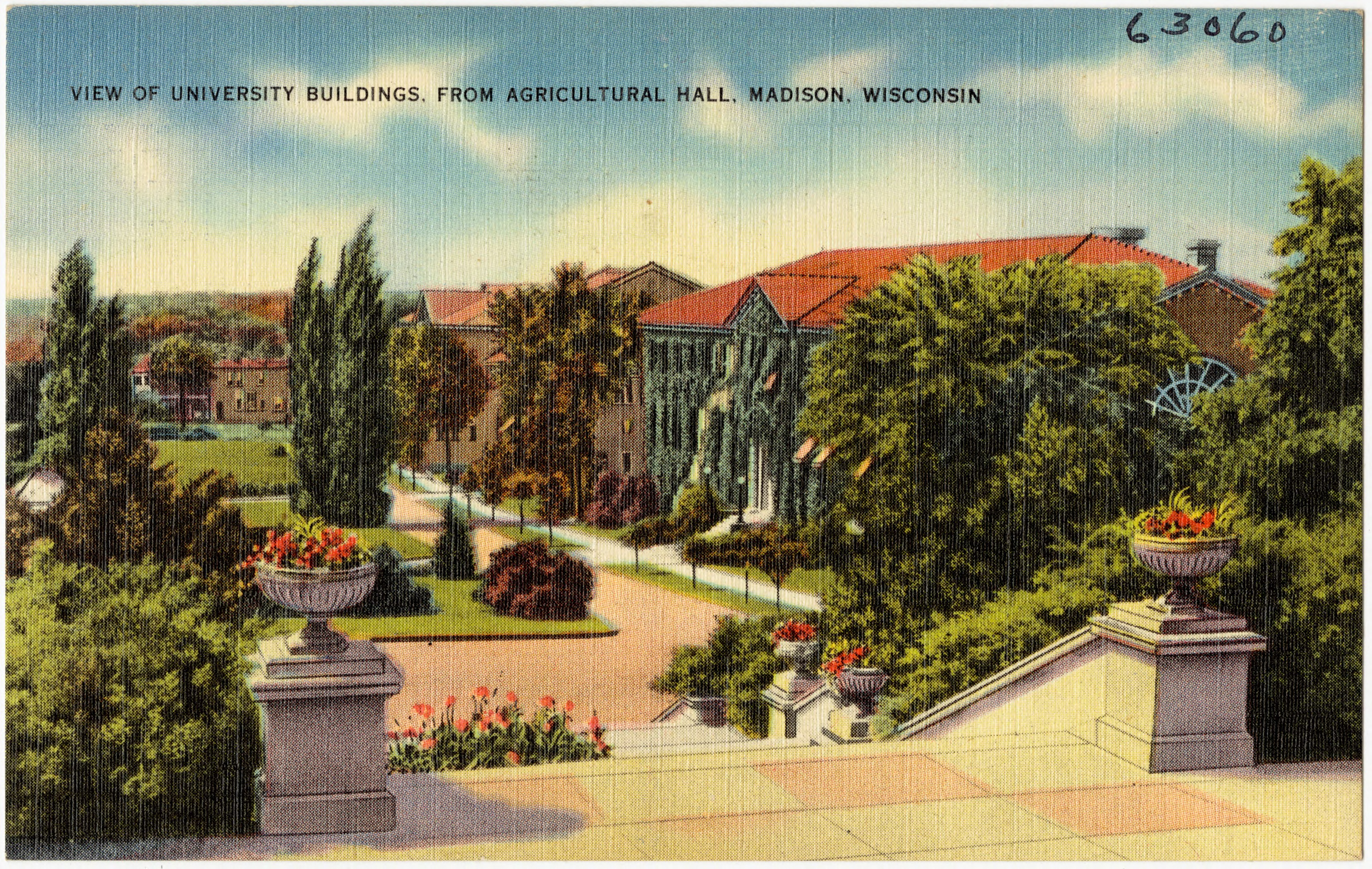
View of Henry Mall from Ag Hall in 1930s or 40s, showing Agricultural Engineering at right and Agronomy to the left

- The 1906 Agronomy Building at 440 Henry Mall is a Renaissance Revival-style building designed by campus architect Arthur Peabody and built while the plan for Henry Mall was taking shape. Clad in red-brown brick with corner quoins and limestone trim, the building sits on a raised, rusticated basement story, with a tall first story, a shorter second story, and a hip roof covered with red tile. The main entry is decorated with balustrades, a transom, and an architrave and pilasters. It was the first UW building built of reinforced concrete, with concrete floors and tile partitions to meet more modern fire codes. Initially the basement held curing storage for grain, the first floor held classrooms, lecture halls, and offices, and the third floor was a single room holding the seed judging department. Over the years, some sections grew out of the building to other places. One resident was Nobel-winning geneticist Joshua Lederberg. Today the building is called Agricultural Journalism. Though small in size compared to its neighbors, it may be the most intact of the buildings in the district.

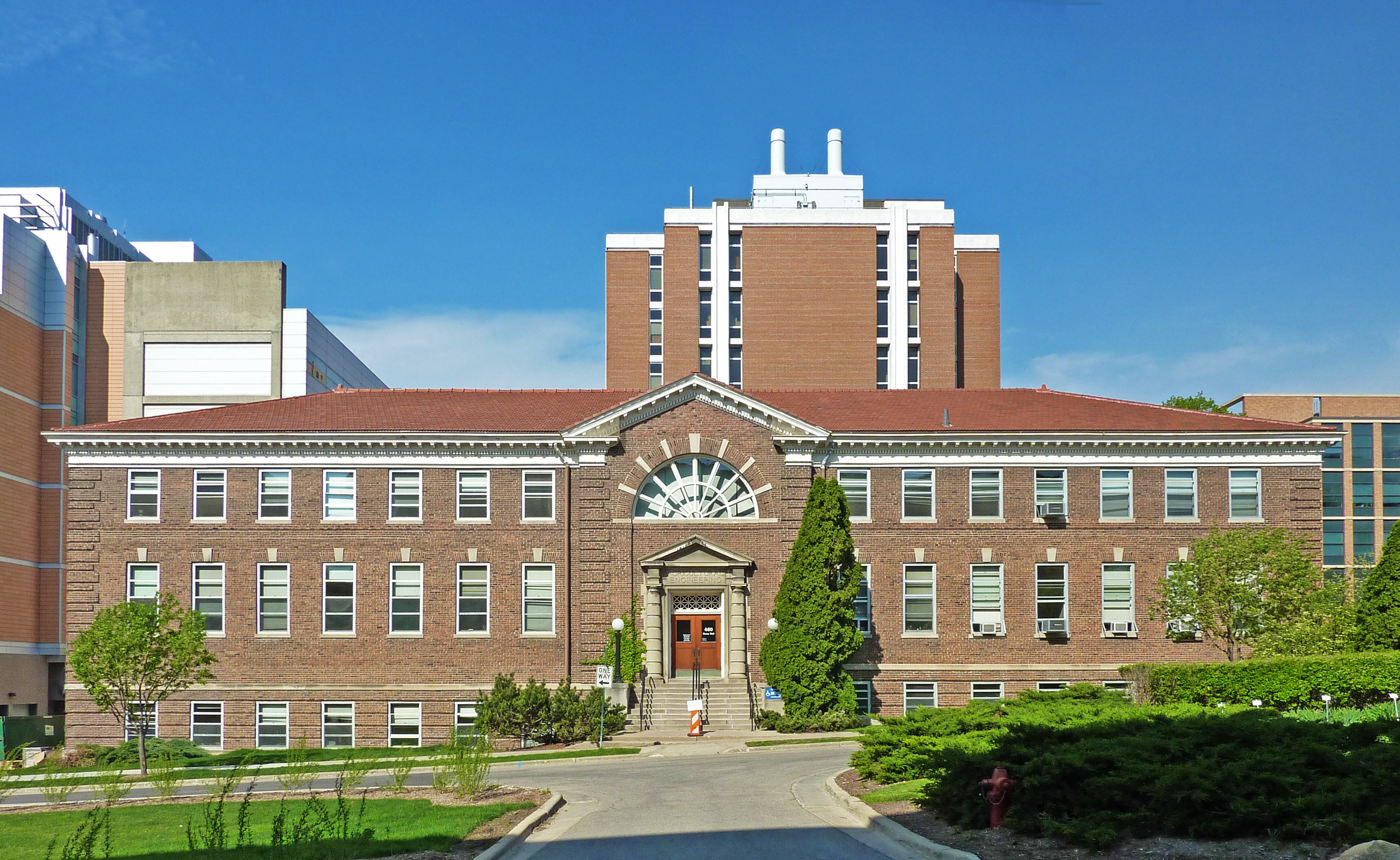
1907 Agricultural Engineering

- The 1907 Agricultural Engineering Building at 460 Henry Mall is another 2-story building in Renaissance Revival style designed by Arthur Peabody. The building is larger than Agronomy, but the styling is similar, except for smaller eaves and the large semicircular window and gable end in the center bay of each side. Here E.R. Jones' conducted some of his soil erosion studies and F.W. Duffee developed his seed corn dryer. Aldo Leopold's new department of Wildlife management was also located in the building for a few years.

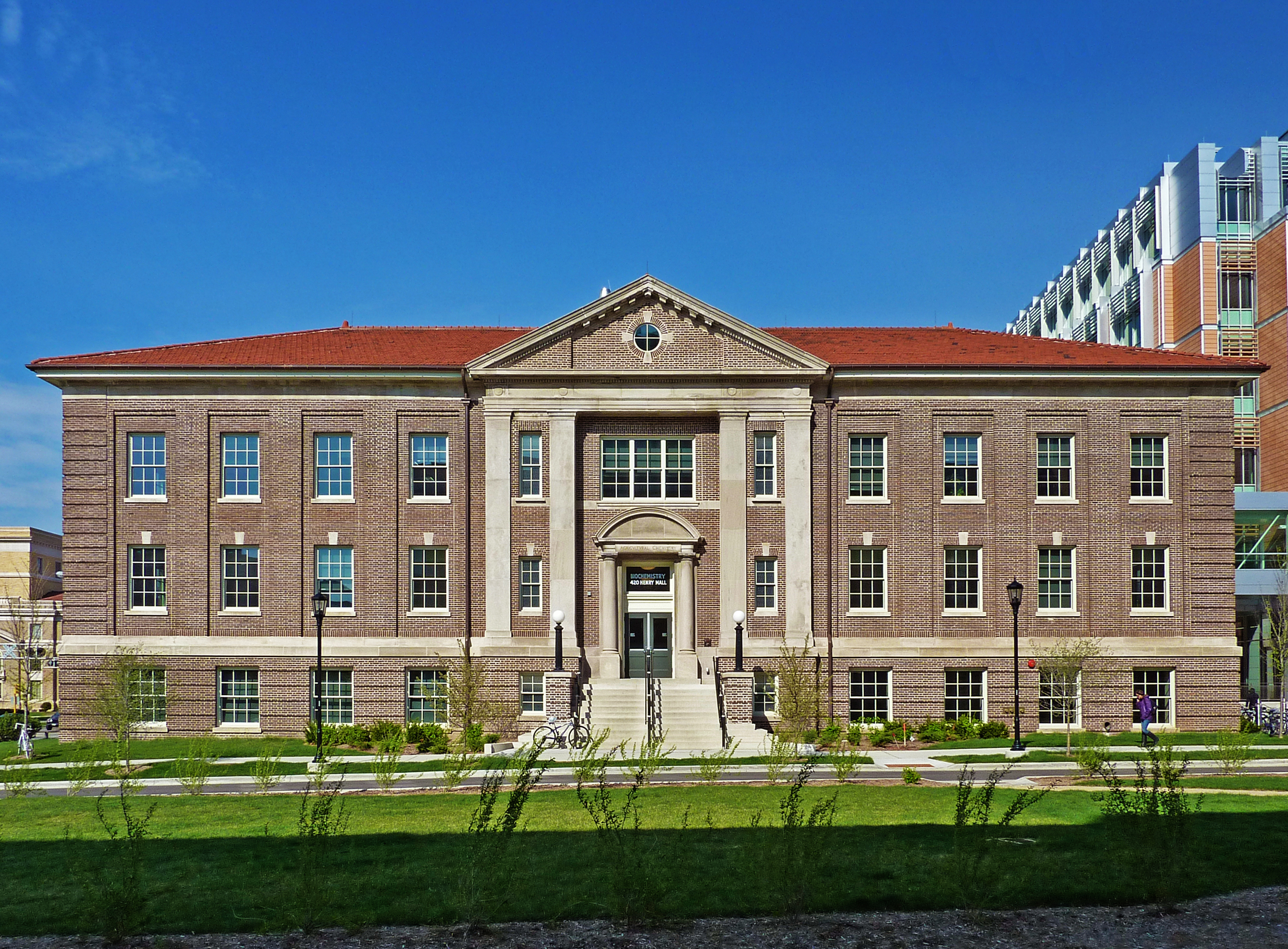
1912 Agricultural Chemistry

- The 1912 Agricultural Chemistry Building at 420 Henry Mall completed the west side of Henry Mall. It is a Neoclassical-style building designed by Laird & Cret. Following the trend of the Agronomy and Ag Engineering buildings before, the facade is symmetric around the main entrance, the building stands two stories on a rusticated raised basement, walls are dark brick with corner quoins, and the roof is hipped covered with red tile. Unlike its brother buildings on the west side, most of the eaves are not dentilated, and the framing of the main entry is larger, with two-story pilasters, an entablature and a large pediment above. The building was expanded in 1939, 1954, 1984, and 1996 in various styles, but the part fronting Henry Mall is the largely intact 1912 section. Many important discoveries were made in this building. To name a few, Elmer McCollum and Marguerite Davis discovered Vitamin A here, Harry Steenbock found that irradiation increased Vitamin D in foods, Conrad Elvehjem isolated niacin which could cure pellagra, and Karl Paul Link discovered the anticoagulant Dicumarol and developed Warfarin. Also, Hector F. DeLuca synthesized hormones derived from vitamin D.
- The 1913-1914 Wisconsin High School at 425 Henry Mall, opposite Ag Chemistry, was designed by Laird & Cret as a Neoclassical, symmetric, brick building along the lines of the Ag Chemistry, Ag Engineering and Agronomy buildings that preceded it, but only two thirds of it were built for budget reasons, and the design was never completed. Nevertheless, it served until 1962 as a training ground for teacher trainees and a place to test techniques on real students in grades 7 to 12. After that it housed some other departments, then was demolished in 1993 to make space for the new Biotechnology center.
- 1914 Henry Mall itself is the landscaped open space stretching from Ag Hall and Linden Avenue to University Avenue - 50 feet wide and 575 feet long.

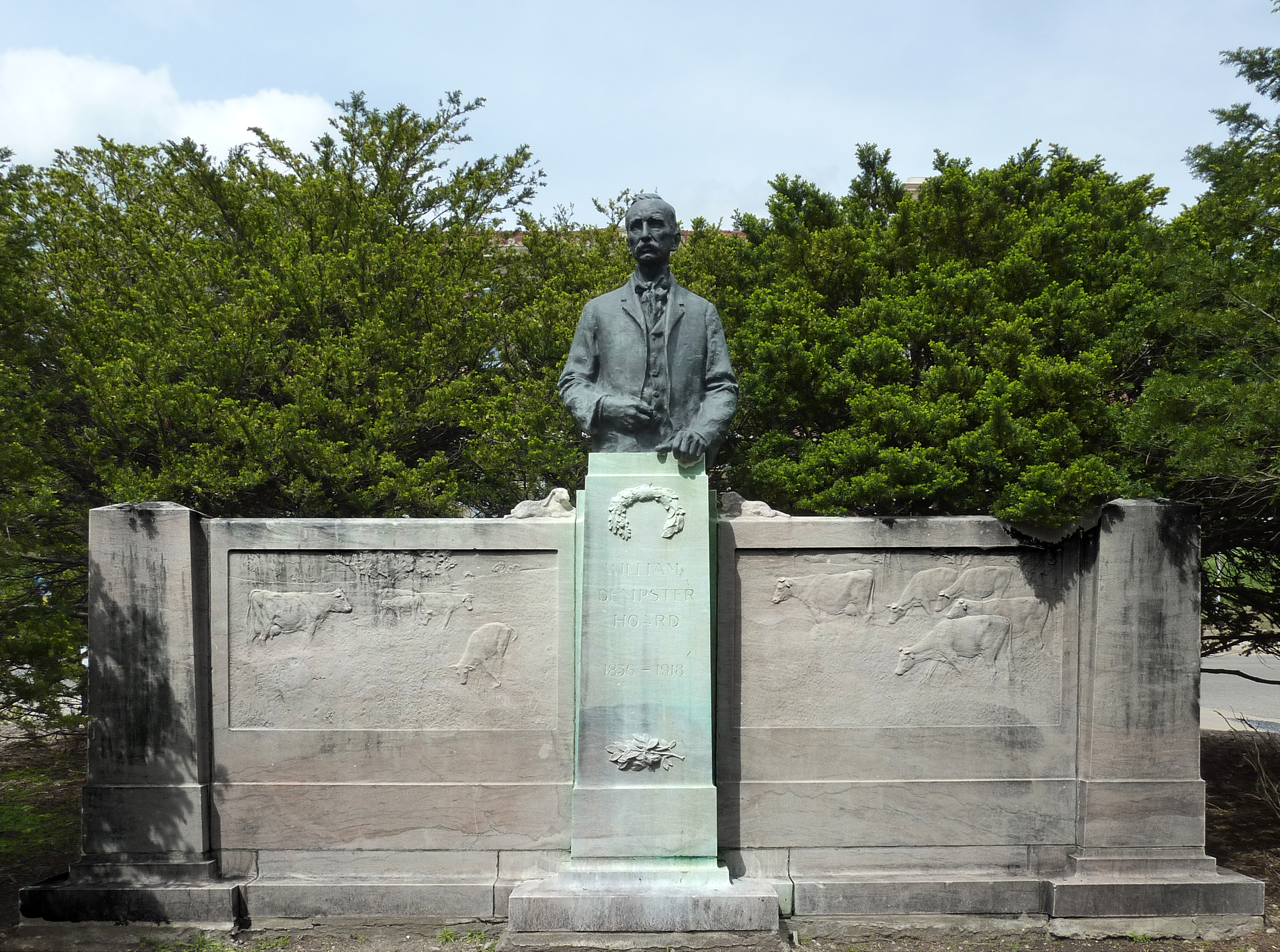
1922 statue of Governor Hoard

- 1922 - The Hoard statue by Mount Rushmore architect Gutzon Borglum honors William Dempster Hoard, the publisher of Hoard's Dairyman magazine, which spread information about progressive dairy techniques direct to farmers. Hoard also served as Governor of Wisconsin and on the UW's Board of Regents.

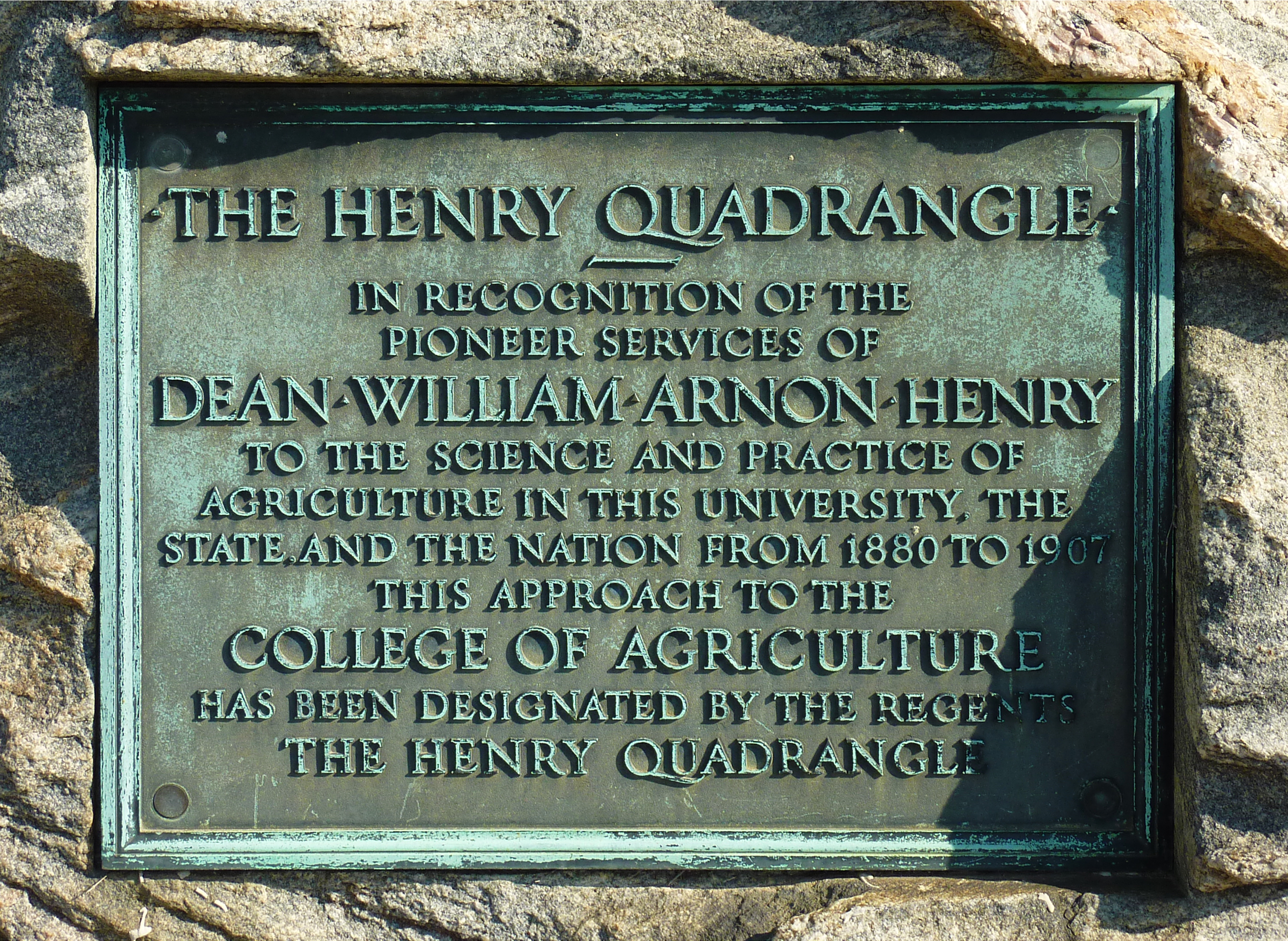
Plaque on the Henry Boulder

- ca 1924 - The Henry boulder is a chunk of gneiss on the mall with a plaque dedicated to Dean Henry, the mall's namesake, who got the College of Agriculture off the ground.
- 1951 Stovall Lab of Hygiene at 465 Henry Mall. No building had been added to the Henry Mall in over 30 years, and by this time the planners were less concerned with unity of style than they had been with the earlier buildings. The Milwaukee firm of Brimeyer, Grellinger & Rose designed a building four stories tall with penthouse. The side facing Henry Mall is symmetric and clad in buff brick, so it resembles the earlier buildings in those respects, but the style is Modern Movement, with minimal ornament beyond the bands of windows. Because of its date of construction the building is not a contributing property to the Henry Mall district.
- 1961 Genetics Building at 445 Henry Mall is a five-story asymmetric building designed by Sieberz & Purcell of Madison with a steel framework holding curtain walls of precast concrete. The two outer bays are clad in orange-colored brick. The style is again Modern Movement with minimal ornament. Genetics also is not a contributing property to the Henry Mall district because of its late date of construction.
