= DeLuca Biochemistry Building =

- Agricultural Chemistry Building
- U.S. National Register of Historic Places
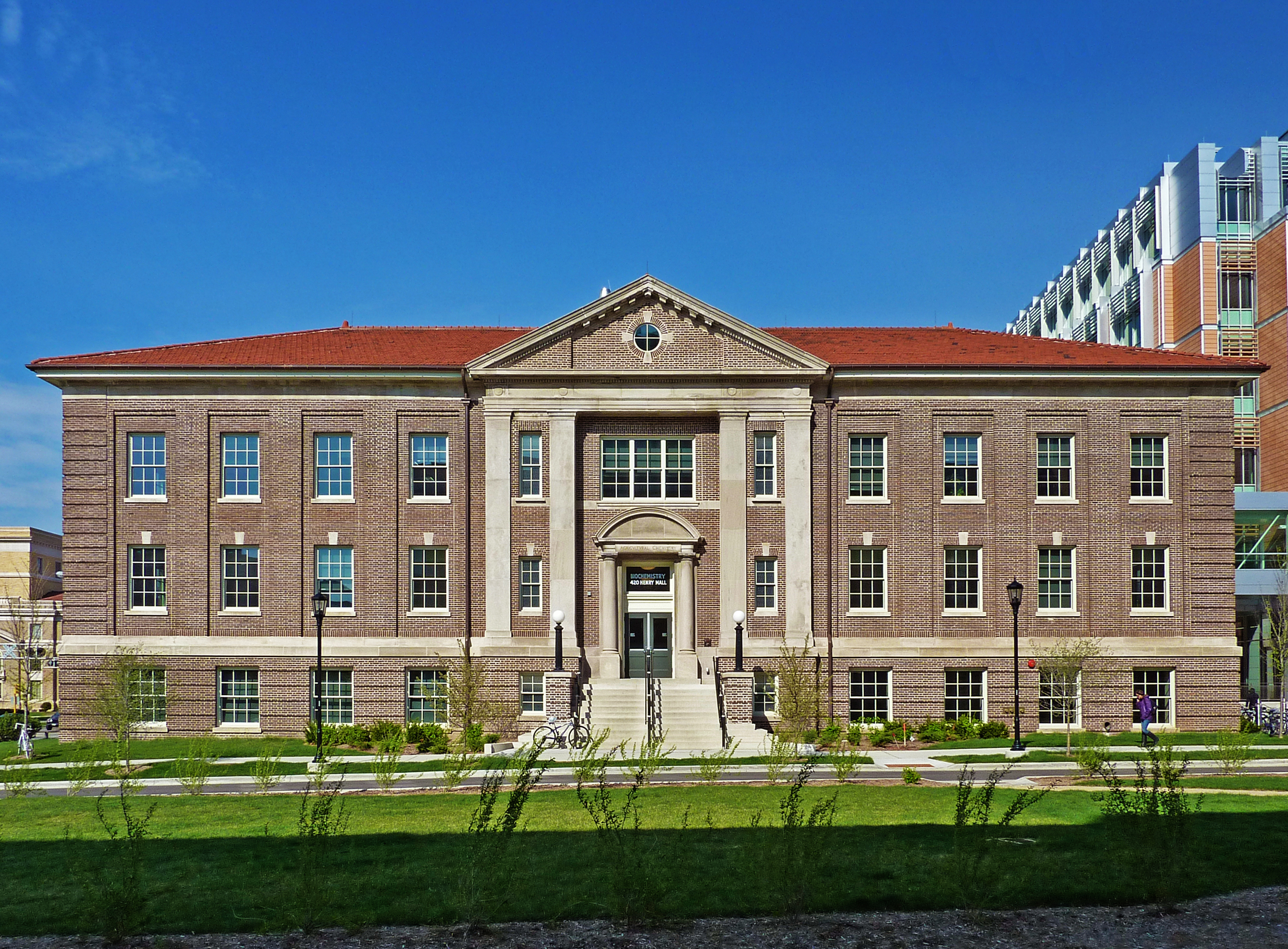

- Location within Wisconsin Location within the United States
- Location: 420 Henry Mall, University of Wisconsin campus, Madison, Wisconsin
- Coordinates: 43°4′26″N 89°24′38″W
- Built: 1912
- Architect: Warren Powers Laird & Paul Philippe Cret
- Architectural style: Colonial Revival, Georgian Revival
- NRHP reference No.: 85001356
- Added to NRHP: June 19, 1985

The Hector F. DeLuca Biochemistry Building, originally known as the Agricultural Chemistry Building, is a historic structure on the campus of the University of Wisconsin–Madison. It was the site of the discovery of vitamins A and B, as well as the development of vitamin D processing.

== History ==
The building was part of the expansion of the College of Agriculture undertaken by Edwin B. Hart. Hart assumed leadership of the department in 1906. The next year, Stephen Moulton Babcock and Elmer McCollum began the single-grain experiment, which fostered the development of agricultural chemistry at Wisconsin. The experiment continued in the Agricultural Chemistry Building when it was built in 1912 and was expended to identify the key elements in nutrition.

In 1913, McCollum identified a molecule in egg yolks, vitamin A. The discovery was consistent with the nutrition element proposed by Frederick Gowland Hopkins a year before. The experiment continued, and in 1915, McCollum identified vitamin B in rice. McCollum left Wisconsin for Johns Hopkins University in 1917 and was succeeded by Harry Steenbock. He continued experimentation on the new molecules, isolating and naming vitamin A in 1920.

Other research by Steenbock identified iron and copper as effective agents in the treatment of anemia. Steenbock made his most significant discovery in 1923, when he established a relationship between vitamin D and ultra-violet light on bone health. He then founded the "Steenbock Process" in 1928, a method of concentrating vitamin D by irradiating food. This method was employed on a large scale through his Wisconsin Alumni Research Fund.

Conrad Elvehjem isolated nicotinic acid (niacin) at the Agricultural Chemistry Building in 1937, which cured pellagra. and Karl Paul Link identified the blood coagulant dicumarol here in 1941. On June 19, 1985, the building was recognized by the National Park Service with a listing on the National Register of Historic Places. A major renovation was completed in 2012 and the building was integrated into the Biochemical Sciences Complex.

The building was named after Hector F. DeLuca in 2013. His research, which was all performed at UW-Madison, identified the active metabolites of vitamin D, and resulted in multiple patents benefiting the Wisconsin Alumni Research Foundation.

It is located within the Henry Mall Historic District.

== Architecture ==
The building is generally Georgian Revival in style with its pediment, quoins, and balustrade. It was designed by Warren Powers Laird & Paul Philippe Cret, who also designed six other buildings on campus: the Central Heating Station, the Stock Pavilion, Lathrop Hall, the Home Economics Buildings, Wisconsin High School, and Sterling Hall.
