= Luca =

Luca or LUCA may refer to:

== People and fictional characters ==
- Luca (masculine given name), including a list of people and fictional characters
- Luca (feminine given name), including a list of people and fictional characters
- Luca (surname), including a list of people

== Places ==
- The ancient name of Lucca, an Etruscan city of Roman Italy
- Luka (Bor), a village in Serbia known as Luca in Romanian

== Arts and entertainment ==
- Luca (2019 film), an Indian Malayalam-language film
- Luca (2021 film), a Disney/Pixar animated film
- Luca Family Singers, a 19th century African-American singing group
- A song from the album The Devil and God Are Raging Inside Me by Brand New
- Luca (Final Fantasy setting), of the video games

== Biology ==
- Luca (genus), moths in the family Notodontidae
- Last universal common ancestor, of all organisms on Earth

== Other uses ==
- London Universities and Colleges Athletics
- Slang for 1,000 pesos in southern South America

== See also ==
- "Luca$", an episode of The Simpsons
- de Luca, a surname
- Luqa, a town in Malta
- Lucca (disambiguation)
- Luka (disambiguation)
- San Luca (disambiguation)
