= Inspector De Luca =

Inspector De Luca may refer to:

- Inspector De Luca (novel series), a trilogy of Italian crime novels by Carlo Lucarelli, and its protagonist, Achille de Luca
- Inspector De Luca (TV series), a 2008 TV series based on the novels
