= Luka =

Luka may refer to:

== People ==
- Luka (given name), a unisex given name
  - Luka Dončić, Slovenian professional basketball player (born 1999)
  - Luka Modrić, Croatian professional footballer (born 1985)
- Luka (singer), stage name of Brazilian singer and songwriter Luciana Karina Santos de Lima (born 1979)
- Luka Keʻelikōlani (1826–1883), Hawaiian princess and governor
- Faimalaga Luka (1940–2005), Tuvaluan politician

== Places ==
=== Bosnia and Herzegovina ===
- Luka, Ilijaš, a village
- Luka, Srebrenica, a village
- Luka, Bosansko Grahovo, a village
- Luka, Konjic, a village
- Luka, Gacko, a village
- Luka, Srebrenik, a village
- Luka, Nevesinje, a village

=== Croatia ===
- Luka, Dubrovnik-Neretva County, a village near Ston
- Luka, Zadar County, a village on the island of Dugi Otok
- Luka, Zagreb County, a village and a municipality near Zaprešić
- Luka, Vrbovec, a village near Vrbovec
- Luka, Rijeka, a section of Rijeka
- Luka Pokupska, a village near Karlovac

=== Czech Republic ===
- Luka (Prague Metro), a metro station in Prague
- Luka (Česká Lípa District), a municipality and village
- Luka (Verušičky), a village and part of Verušičky
- Luká, a municipality and village in Olomouc District
- Luka nad Jihlavou, a market town in Jihlava District

=== Democratic Republic of the Congo ===
- Luka (river), a river that flows through the Kahuzi-Biéga National Park

=== Poland ===
- Łuka, Podlaskie Voivodeship, a village
- Łuka, Warmian-Masurian Voivodeship, a village

=== Serbia ===
- Luka (Bor), a village

=== Slovakia ===
- Lúka, a village in the Trenčín Region

== Films ==
- Luka (1992 film), a film directed by Tomislav Radić
- Luka (2023 film), a film directed by Jessica Woodworth

== Other uses ==
- "Luka" (song), by Suzanne Vega
- MW Motors Luka EV, a Czech electric car
- Megurine Luka, sound library for the vocal synthesizer Vocaloid

== See also ==
- Luca (disambiguation)
