= Luca yanayacensis =

Scientific classification
- Kingdom: Animalia
- Phylum: Arthropoda
- Clade: Pancrustacea
- Class: Insecta
- Order: Lepidoptera
- Superfamily: Noctuoidea
- Family: Notodontidae
- Genus: Luca
- Species: L. yanayacensis

Binomial name
- Luca yanayacensis Miller, 2011

Species of moth

Luca yanayacensis is a moth of the family Notodontidae first described by James S. Miller in 2011. It is found in north-eastern Ecuador.
