= Lucca (surname) =

Lucca is a surname. Notable people with the surname include:

- Anthony James Lucca (born 1976), American singer, songwriter, record producer, and actor
- Bolívar Pagán Lucca (1897 –1961), Puerto Rican historian, journalist, and politician
- Jonatan Lucca (born 1994), Brazilian professional footballer
- Lorenzo Lucca (born 2000), Italian professional footballer
- Mariano Daniel Lucca (born 1967), Argentine sailor.
- Pauline Lucca (1841 – 1908), Austrian operatic dramatic soprano
- Papo Lucca (born 1946), Puerto Rican multi-instrumentalist
- Riccardo Lucca (born 1997), Italian racing cyclist

== See also ==
- Luca (surname)
- Lucca (disambiguation)
