= De Lucas =

de Lucas, deLucas, DeLucas or variants thereof may refer to:

- Ángel Javier Arizmendi de Lucas (born 1984), Spanish footballer
- Ernesto de Lucas Hopkins (born 1976), Mexican politician
- Lawrence J. DeLucas (born 1950), U.S. astronaut and biochemist
- Luiyi de Lucas (born 1994), Dominican footballer
- Pablo de Lucas (born 1986), Spanish footballer
- Quique de Lucas (born 1978), Spanish footballer

== See also ==
- De Luca (surname)
- Lucas (disambiguation)
