= British American Drama Academy =

Drama school in the United Kingdom

The British American Drama Academy is a drama school in London. It is affiliated with Sarah Lawrence College in Yonkers which is adjacent to The Bronx, New York and Yale University.

== Background ==
The British American Drama Academy (BADA) was set up in 1983 by Tony Branch and Carolyn Sands. Its goal is to enable students from around the world to study classical theatre with actors and directors of the British theatre. The program moved in 1985 to Regents Park, London. Since 1988, it has been affiliated with Sarah Lawrence College, which has spring and fall semesters with BADA in London for credit.

=== Notable alumni ===
Past students have included:

- Michael Arata
- Jacinda Barrett
- Byrdie Bell
- Orlando Bloom
- Chris Bortz
- Chadwick Boseman
- Brian Patrick Butler
- Adam Daniel
- Jack Davenport
- Brandon Victor Dixon
- Chiara de Luca
- Jennifer Ehle
- Melissa Errico
- Paul Giamatti
- Peri Gilpin
- Mamie Gummer
- Anna Gunn
- Noah Harlan
- Da'Vine Joy Randolph
- Jamie Kennedy
- Yunjin Kim
- Tarell Alvin McCraney
- T.J. Miller
- Simone Missick
- Elizabeth Mitchell
- Ruth Negga
- Nicole Oliver
- Oliver Platt
- Paul Rudd
- Marco Sanchez
- David Schwimmer
- Billy Slaughter
- Adam Smoluk
- Ryan Jamaal Swain
- Nicole Sullivan
- Joy Tanner
- Justin Theroux
- Tracie Thoms
- Nicolas Wright
- Bellamy Young
