= Carlo Lucarelli =

Italian writer, TV presenter, and magazine editor (born 1960)

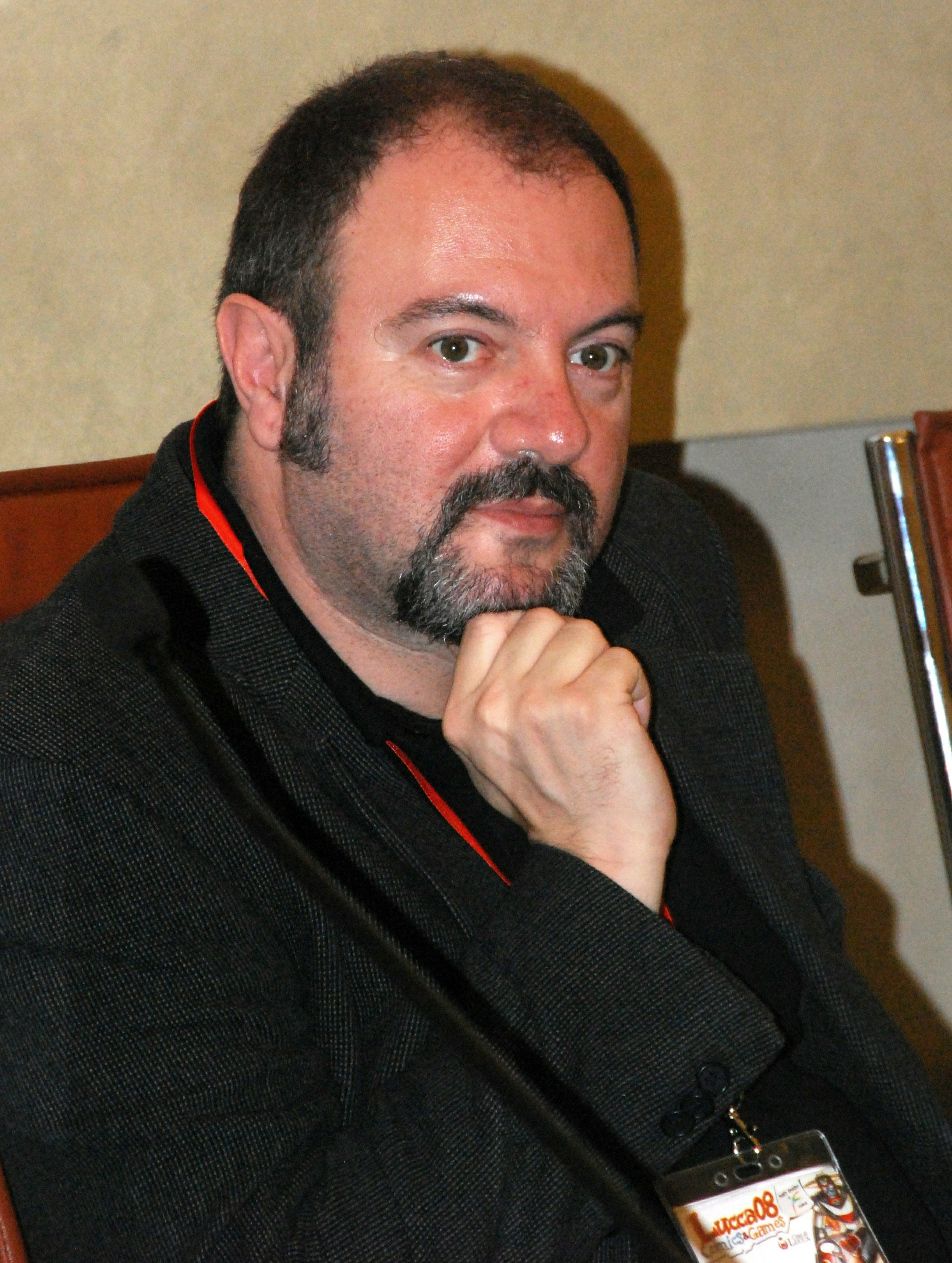
- Born: Carlo Lucarelli; 26 October 1960 (age 65); Parma, Italy
- Occupations: Novelist, journalist, screenwriter, television presenter
- Years active: 1990–present
- Height: 1.75 m (5 ft 9 in)

Carlo Lucarelli (born 26 October 1960) is an Italian crime-writer, TV presenter, and magazine editor. In 2003, his novel Almost Blue was shortlisted for the Gold Dagger award given by the Crime Writers' Association.

== Early life ==
Lucarelli was born in Parma, Italy, the son of a physician. He was interested in literature and theatre when he was young, and studied Literature and History.

Already in his years of study, during his research for his thesis subject, he got in touch with the material for his first two books, which take place during the time of fascism and the years immediately after the war.

He considers himself Roman Catholic, although a non-practising one and critical of the Church on some issues.

== Career ==
In Italy, he became well-known quite soon because of these two books, and it was only a matter of time before he quit his academic activities and turned to his career as an author and all other sorts of literary activities, such as writing plays, film scenarios, radio-plays and, moreover, singing in a Post-Punk-Band called "Progetto K".

For a time, he was the presenter of a popular Italian television programme about crime, Blu notte misteri d'Italia (Blue Night Mysteries of Italy). As a journalist, Lucarelli has worked for several newspapers and magazines, among them il manifesto, Il Messaggero and L'Europeo. He has written more than twenty novels and numerous short stories. Together with Marcello Fois and Loriano Macchiavelli, he founded "Gruppo 13", a collective of crime-writers from the region of Emilia-Romagna.

Lucarelli co-wrote the scripts of Detective De Luca. A crime fiction television series released in 2008, it was adapted from his trilogy of novels set in the time of Italy's fascist history during the years from 1938 to 1948.

== Bibliography ==
Incomplete, English translations only. For the full bibliography, see the Italian Wikipedia Carlo Lucarelli page.

=== The De Luca Trilogy ===
- Carte Blanche, translated by Michael Reynolds (Carta bianca, 1990)
- The Damned Season (L'estate torbida, 1991)
- Via Delle Oche (1996)
- The Darkest Winter, translated by Joseph Farrell (Orenda Books, 2025)

=== The Inspector Grazia Negro Series ===
- Almost Blue, translated by Oonagh Stransky (1997)
- Day After Day (Un giorno dopo l'altro, 2000)
