= Luca herbida =

Scientific classification
- Kingdom: Animalia
- Phylum: Arthropoda
- Clade: Pancrustacea
- Class: Insecta
- Order: Lepidoptera
- Superfamily: Noctuoidea
- Family: Notodontidae
- Genus: Luca
- Species: L. herbida

Binomial name
- Luca herbida Walker, 1862

Species of moth

Luca herbida is a moth of the family Notodontidae first described by Francis Walker in 1862. It is found in Brazil.
