= Guerrino De Luca =

Logitech's board of directors chairman

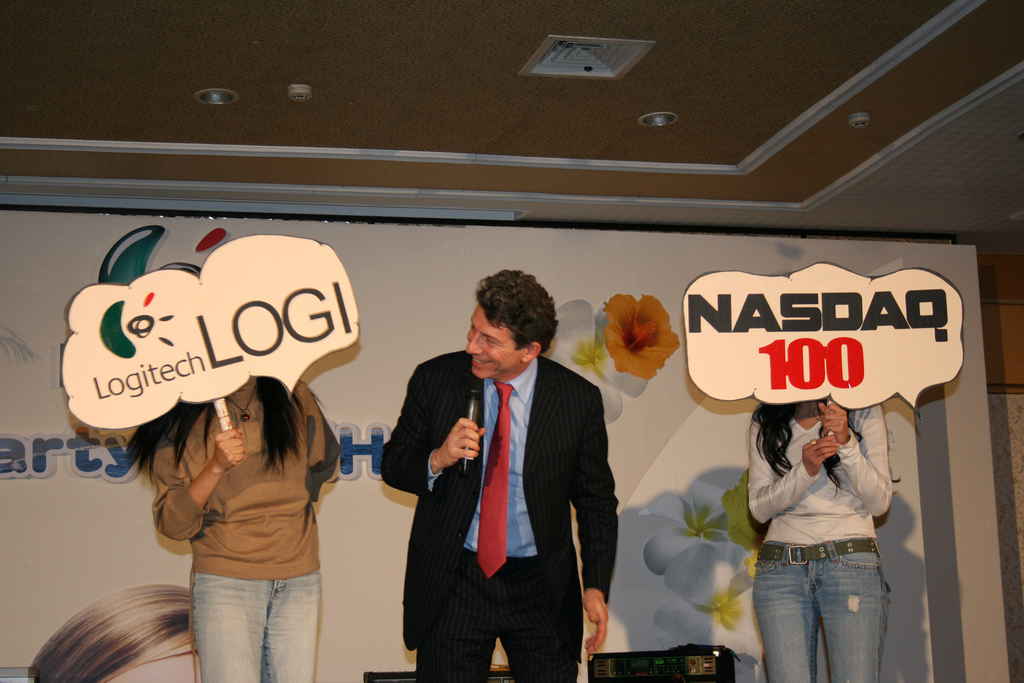
- At a Logitech Chinese New Year party in Taiwan
- Born: September 1952; Lanciano, Italy
- Occupation: Executive Director at Logitech
- Spouse: Daniela
- Children: Ottavia De Luca; Chiara De Luca

Guerrino De Luca is the chairman of Logitech's board of directors. He served as President and CEO from 1998 to 2008.

== Early life and education ==
De Luca holds a degree in Engineering from the University of Rome.

== Career ==
From 1995 to 1997, De Luca was President at Claris Corp. In September 1997, he resigned from his role as Executive Vice President of Worldwide Marketing for Apple Computer Inc. He held that position from December 1996 to August 1997.

Guerrino joined Logitech in 1998. One of his main accomplishments was the purchase of webcam manufacturer Connectix.

== Personal life ==
Originally from Italy, De Luca now resides in San Francisco. He has two daughters, Ottavia and Chiara, by his former wife Daniela.
