= Lucca (disambiguation) =

Lucca is a city in Italy.

Lucca may also refer to:

- Lucca (dog), United States Marine Corps service dog
- Lucca Allen (born 2002), Irish racing driver
- Lucca (footballer, born 1990), full name Lucca Borges de Brito, Brazilian winger
- Lucca (footballer, born 2003), full name Lucca Holanda Sampaio Tavares, Brazilian forward
- Lucca Ashtear, a videogame character from Chrono Trigger
- Lucca Marques (born 2007), full name Lucca Marques Alencar, Brazilian football winger
- Republic of Lucca, a historic state of Italy
- Lucca (surname), Italian surname

== See also ==
- Luca (disambiguation)
