= WiCell =

Scientific research institute

Coordinates: 43°03′28.5″N 89°28′51.0″W

WiCell Research Institute
- Established: 1998; 27 years ago
- Location: Madison, Wisconsin, USA
- Website: www.wicell.org

WiCell Research Institute is a scientific research institute in Madison, Wisconsin that focuses on stem cell research. Independently governed and supported as a 501(c)(3) organization, WiCell operates as an affiliate of the Wisconsin Alumni Research Foundation and works to advance stem cell research at the University of Wisconsin–Madison and beyond.

== History ==
Established in 1998 to develop stem cell technology, WiCell Research Institute is a nonprofit organization that creates and distributes human pluripotent stem cell lines worldwide. WiCell also provides cytogenetic and technical services, establishes scientific protocols and supports basic research on the UW-Madison campus.

WiCell serves as home to the Wisconsin International Stem Cell Bank. This stem cell repository stores, characterizes and provides access to stem cell lines for use in research and clinical development. The cell bank originally stored the first five human Embryonic stem cell lines derived by Dr. James Thomson of UW–Madison. It currently houses human embryonic stem cell lines, induced pluripotent stem cell lines, clinical grade cell lines developed in accordance with Good Manufacturing Practices (GMP) and differentiated cell lines including neural progenitor cells.

To support continued progress in the field and help unlock the therapeutic potential of stem cells, in 2005 WiCell began providing cytogenetic services and quality control testing services. These services allow scientists to identify genetic abnormalities in cells or changes in stem cell colonies that might affect research results.

== Organization ==
Chartered with a mission to support scientific investigation and research at UW–Madison, WiCell collaborates with faculty members and provides support with stem cell research projects. The institute established its cytogenetic laboratory to meet the growing needs of academic and commercial researchers to monitor genetic stability in stem cell cultures.

== Facilities ==
WiCell maintains its stem cell banking facilities, testing and quality assurance laboratories and scientific team in UW–Madison’s University Research Park.

UW–Madison faculty members use the institute’s laboratory space to conduct research, improve stem cell culture techniques and develop materials used in stem cell research.

To ensure the therapeutic relevance of its cell lines, WiCell banks clinical grade cells under GMP guidelines. The organization works cooperatively with Waisman Biomanufacturing, a provider of cGMP manufacturing services for materials and therapeutics qualified for human clinical trials.

== Selected technologies ==
The following technologies employed by WiCell allow scientists to conduct stem cell research with greater assurance of reproducible results, an expectation for publication in peer-reviewed journals. Scientific tools and services include:

- G-banded karyotyping, a baseline genomic screen that helps monitor genetic stability as cell colonies grow;
- Spectral karyotyping, which may be used as an adjunct to g-banded karyotyping and helps define complex rearrangements as well as genetic marker chromosomes;
- CGH, SNP, and CGH + SNP Microarrays, which detect genomic gains and losses as well as copy number changes;
- Fluorescence in situ hybridization (FISH), a test used to confirm findings and screen for microdeletions or duplications of known targets;
- fastFISH, a rapid screen for large numbers of clones and a cost-effective tool for monitoring aneuploidy; and
- Short Tandem Repeat Analysis, which may be used to monitor the identity of a cell line and confirm the relationship of induced pluripotent stem cells to their parent.
