= Anthony DeLuca =

Anthony DeLuca may refer to:

- Anthony J. DeLuca, American politician, Delaware state senator
- Anthony DeLuca (Illinois politician) (born 1970), Illinois state representative
- Anthony DeLuca II, Rhode Island state senator
- Tony DeLuca (politician) (Anthony M. DeLuca Sr., 1937–2022), Pennsylvania state representative
- Tony DeLuca (American football) (Anthony Lawrence DeLuca, 1960–1999), American football player
- Anthony DeLuca (musician), drummer for Blake Babies, Swirlies, and Negative Approach
