= Hector DeLuca =

American biochemist

Hector Floyd DeLuca
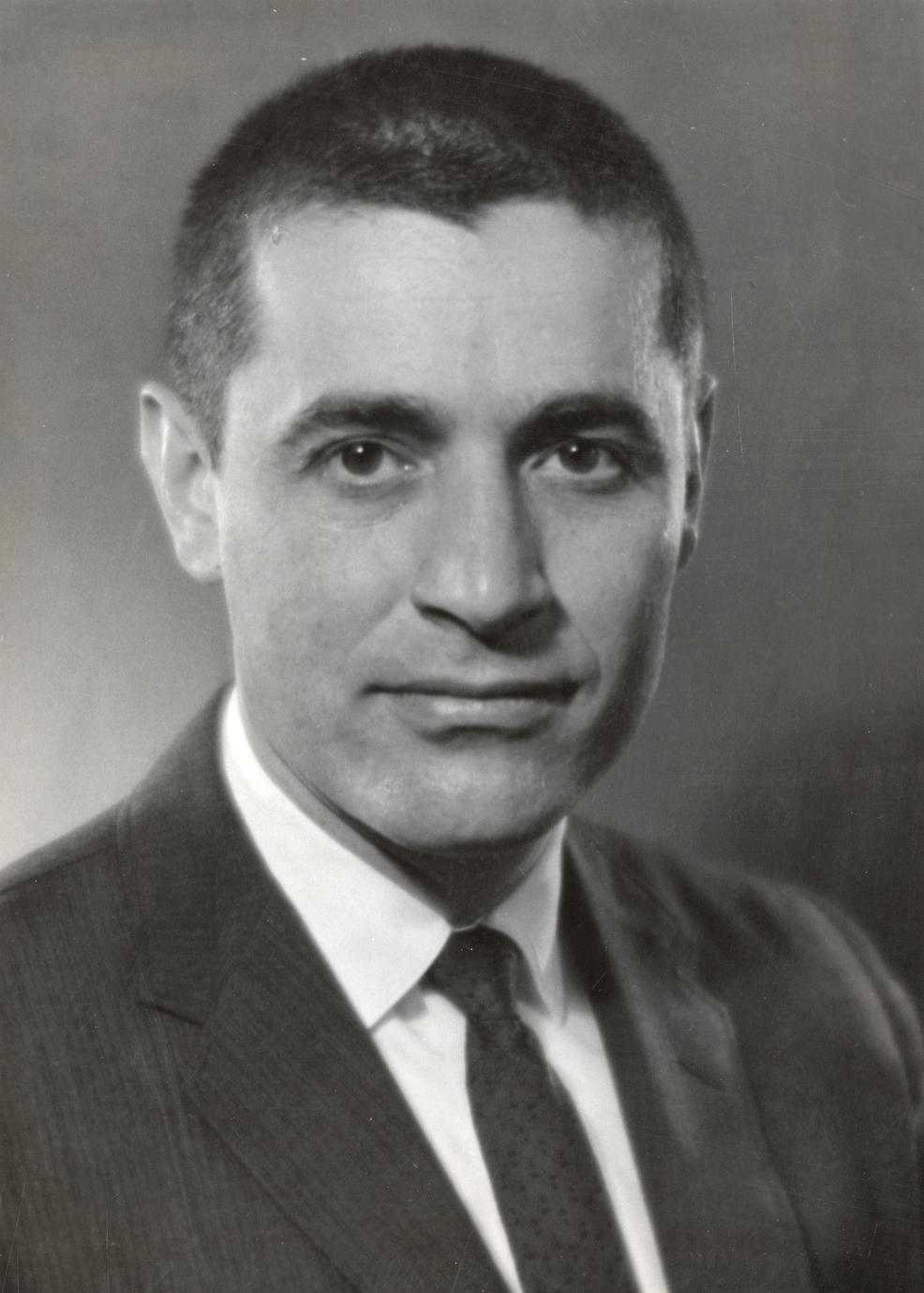
- Born: April 5, 1930 (age 96); Pueblo, Colorado
- Education: University of Colorado, B.A.; University of Wisconsin-Madison, Ph.D.
- Known for: Research on Vitamin D
- Awards: Bolton S. Corson Medal of the Franklin Institute
- Scientific career
- Workplaces: University of Wisconsin–Madison

Hector Floyd DeLuca (born in Pueblo, Colorado in 1930) is a University of Wisconsin–Madison (UW-Madison) emeritus professor and former chairman of the university's biochemistry department. DeLuca is well known for his research involving Vitamin D, from which several pharmaceutical drugs are derived, including those to treat conditions such as kidney failure, osteoporosis, and psoriasis.

DeLuca trained almost 160 graduate students and has nearly 2000 patents to his name. Licensing of his technology, through the Wisconsin Alumni Research Foundation (WARF), has generated tens of millions of dollars in revenue for the university.

In addition, DeLuca founded three biotechnology companies: Deltanoid Pharmaceuticals, Bone Care International Inc, and Tetrionics.

He was elected to the United States National Academy of Sciences in 1979. He was awarded the Bolton S. Corson Medal of the Franklin Institute in 1985. Three buildings on the Wisconsin campus, including the DeLuca Biochemistry Building, were named in his honor in 2014.

== Early life and education ==
=== Early life ===
Hector F. DeLuca was born in Pueblo, Colorado, in 1930, and grew up on a vegetable farm outside the city. This rural upbringing, combined with the industrial backdrop of Pueblo at the foot of the Rocky Mountains, shaped his early interest in science and exploration.

=== Education ===
DeLuca pursued undergraduate studies at the University of Colorado, where he majored in chemistry and graduated in 1951. He later joined the UW–Madison for graduate studies, working under renowned biochemist Harry Steenbock. As a graduate student, DeLuca contributed to foundational research in vitamins and nutrition. He earned his MS in 1953 and his PhD in 1955, His doctoral dissertation is entitled “The Effect of Vitamin D on Alkaline Phosphatase in the Rachitic Rat”. Upon Steenbock's retirement in 1955, DeLuca took over the lab, continuing his mentor’s pioneering work.

== Career ==
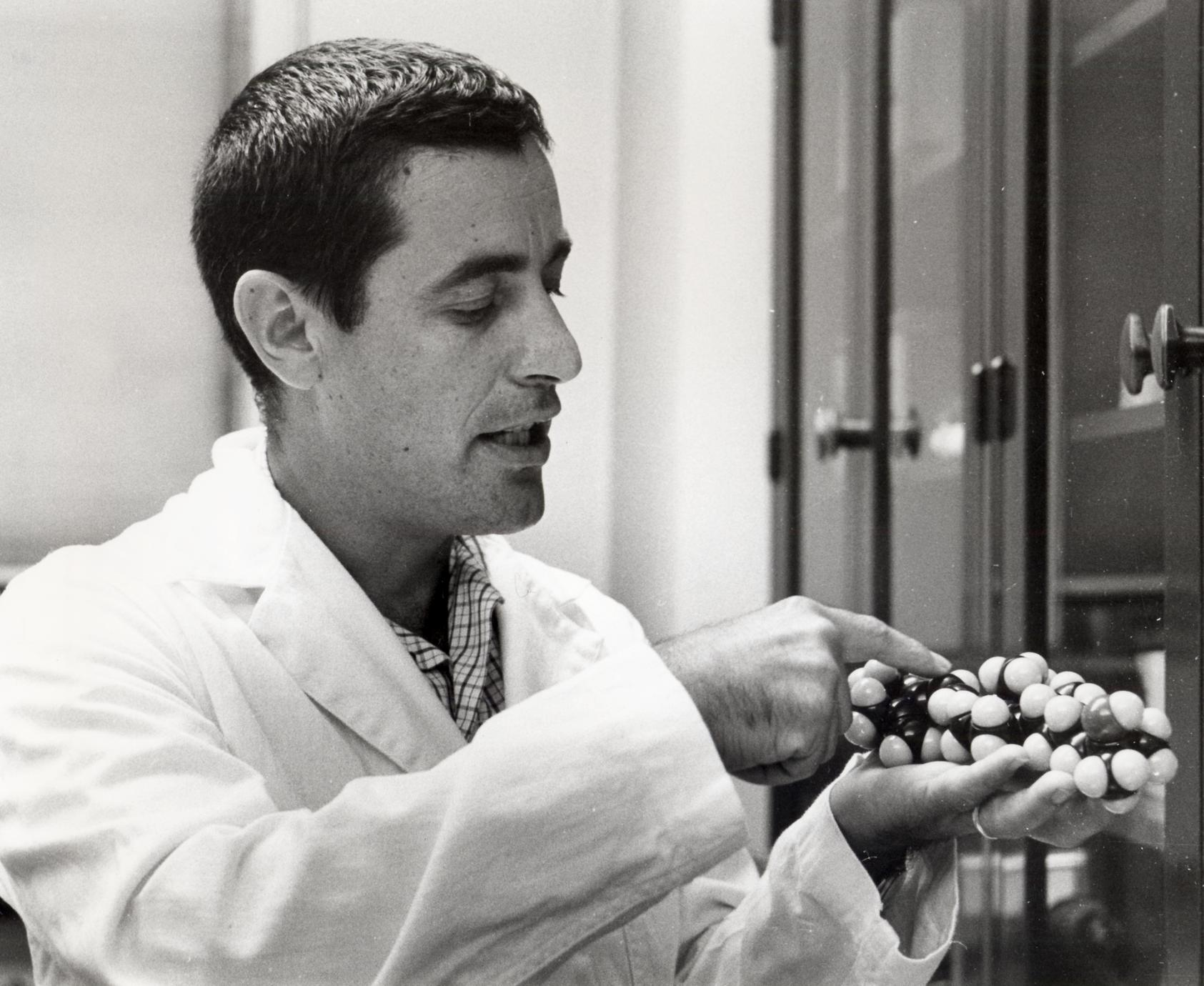
Professor of Biochemistry, University of Wisconsin-Madison

DeLuca’s scientific career is distinguished by his research on the metabolism and mechanism of action of vitamins, particularly Vitamin D. His work unveiled the hormonal roles of Vitamin D, significantly enhancing the understanding of its impact on human health. His research established the UW-Madison as a global hub for Vitamin D studies, contributing to advancements in endocrinology, nutrition, and pharmaceutical sciences.

=== Key discoveries ===
DeLuca’s work focused on unraveling the complex processes of Vitamin D metabolism, leading to the identification of two critical metabolites:

- 25-hydroxyvitamin D3 (25-OH-D3): Isolated by DeLuca in 1968, this metabolite is produced in the liver and serves as the major circulating form of Vitamin D. Its discovery was pivotal in understanding how the body processes Vitamin D obtained from diet or sunlight.
- 1,25-dihydroxyvitamin D3 (1,25-(OH)2D3): DeLuca further identified this metabolite as the active hormonal form of Vitamin D, produced in the kidneys. This compound regulates calcium and phosphate metabolism, ensuring proper bone formation and maintenance.

=== Pharmaceutical innovations ===
Based on his discoveries, DeLuca spearheaded the development of synthetic Vitamin D analogs. These compounds have been instrumental in creating treatments for various medical conditions, including:

- Chronic Kidney Disease: Addressing secondary hyperparathyroidism through Vitamin D-based therapies, improving calcium regulation in patients with impaired kidney function
- Osteoporosis: Enhancing bone density and reducing fracture risk, particularly in postmenopausal women and aging populations
- Psoriasis: Developing topical therapies using Vitamin D analogs to reduce inflammation and promote skin health

=== Entrepreneurship ===
DeLuca founded three pharmaceutical companies: Deltanoid Pharmaceuticals, Bone Care International Inc, and Tetrionics.

In 2001, DeLuca founded Deltanoid Pharmaceuticals, a biotechnology company dedicated to advancing therapies derived from Vitamin D research. Deltanoid focused on translating laboratory findings into clinical applications, particularly for rare and complex diseases. This venture highlights DeLuca’s commitment to bridging the gap between academic discovery and real-world medical solutions. Deltanoid Pharmaceuticals operated from 2001-2018.

DeLuca founded the company Bone Care International Inc, a maker of drugs to treat dialysis patients in 1994. The drug Doxercalciferol/Hectorol, a synthetic vitamin D pro-hormone for treatment of secondary hyperparathyroidism, was produced and launched by Bone Care International in 1999. Bone Care International was sold to Genzyme in 2005.

DeLuca founded Tetrionics in 1989, later bought by Sigma-Aldrich in 2004. Tetrionics manufactured pharmaceutical ingredients, including Paricalcitol (trade name Zemplar(™)), which is used to treat secondary hyperparathyroidism.

=== Academic and professional roles ===
DeLuca served as the chairman of the Biochemistry Department at UW-Madison for 30 years. Under his leadership, the department became a global center for vitamin and hormone research. He fostered a culture of excellence, attracting top-tier faculty and students while ensuring the department remained at the forefront of scientific innovation.

=== Research Funding and Impact ===
DeLuca’s collaborations with the Wisconsin Alumni Research Foundation (WARF) significantly advanced the university’s research capabilities. His discoveries and the resulting patents generated tens of millions of dollars in revenue. This funding has supported countless research projects, new facilities, and scholarships, strengthening UW-Madison’s reputation as a leading research institution.

== Controversies ==
DeLuca’s career has not been without challenges. A notable controversy he was involved in centered around patent disputes related to his discoveries of Vitamin D metabolites. DeLuca’s work (along with his research partner, Dr. Heinrich K. Schnoes) in isolating and identifying 25-hydroxyvitamin D3, 1,25-dihydroxyvitamin D3 and synthesizing 1-alpha-HCC led to a series of patents filed through the Wisconsin Alumni Research Foundation (WARF), including patents for the manufacturing process of 1-alpha-HCC and its medical applications.

These patents became the subject of a legal dispute with a competing biochemistry company, the Research Institute of Medicine and Chemistry (RIMAC) with a court case brought by RIMAC against WARF, alleging that RIMAC scientists had been the first to successfully synthesize 1-alpha-HCC and DeLuca’s lab had information gained from a paper sent to them for peer review by RIMAC. The case was settled out of court in 1987 with WARF paying an unknown sum, and RIMAC relinquishing patent rights. Following this case, UW-Madison Chancellor Donna Shalala convened an investigative committee, chaired by retired Senior Federal Judge John Reynolds. After a four-day hearing in 1989, the committee concluded that no scientific misconduct had occurred. The issue was put to rest in 1995, when the United States’ Office of Special Investigations later concluded that the hearing was thorough and unbiased.

== Awards and recognition ==
DeLuca has received numerous prestigious awards and accolades throughout his career, recognizing his groundbreaking research, leadership, and contributions to science and medicine. His achievements have earned him national and international acclaim.

Here are some of the awards and recognition received by Professor DeLuca. These awards and more can be found at the Hector DeLuca Lab website.

- Hector F. DeLuca Scientific achievement award (2015) – celebrates significant scientific contributions advancing biohealth and revolutionizing healthcare, in honor of Dr. Hector F. DeLuca's legacy
- CALS Distinguished Service Award (UW - Madison, 2007) – Celebrating his legacy as an alumnus and a pioneer in biochemistry
- Hilldale Award in the Physical Sciences (UW - Madison, 1993) – Celebrating his exceptional teaching and research achievements
- Bolton S. Corson Medal (Franklin Institute, 1985) – For his exceptional contributions to biochemistry and Vitamin D research
- National Academy of Sciences (1979) – Elected as a member in recognition of his distinguished and continuing achievements in original research
- American Academy of Arts and Sciences (1978) – elected as a member in recognition of excellence in the sciences, and commitment to the ideals of the Academy
