= Luca (moth) =

Scientific classification
- Kingdom: Animalia
- Phylum: Arthropoda
- Clade: Pancrustacea
- Class: Insecta
- Order: Lepidoptera
- Superfamily: Noctuoidea
- Family: Notodontidae
- Subfamily: Heterocampinae
- Genus: Luca; Walker, 1862

Genus of moths

Luca is a genus of moths of the family Notodontidae first described by Francis Walker in 1862.

== Species ==
- Luca herbida Walker, 1862
- Luca yanayacensis Miller, 2011
