= Wisconsin Alumni Research Foundation =

Patent-holding organization

The Wisconsin Alumni Research Foundation was established in 1925.

The Wisconsin Alumni Research Foundation is the independent nonprofit technology transfer organization serving the University of Wisconsin–Madison and Morgridge Institute for Research. It provides significant research support, granting tens of millions of dollars to the university each year and contributing to the university's "margin of excellence".

== History ==
WARF was founded in 1925 to manage a discovery by Harry Steenbock, who invented the process for using ultraviolet radiation to add vitamin D to milk and other foods. Rather than leaving the invention unpatented—then the standard practice for university inventions—Steenbock used $300 of his own money to file for a patent. He received commercial interest from Quaker Oats but declined the company's initial offer.

Instead, Steenbock sought a way to protect discoveries made by UW-Madison faculty, ensure use of the ideas for public benefit and bring any financial gains back to the university. His concept gained support from Harry L. Russell, dean of the College of Agriculture, and Charles Sumner Slichter, dean of the Graduate School.

Slichter began soliciting the interest and financial support of wealthy UW-Madison alumni acquaintances in Chicago and New York. He gained a substantial sum in verbal pledges from a number of alumni, nine of whom would eventually contribute $100 each.

The UW Board of Regents approved the plan on June 22, 1925, and the organization's charter was filed with the Secretary of State of Wisconsin on November 14 that same year. The organization was named the Wisconsin Alumni Research Foundation to reflect both its governing body of five UW–Madison alumni and its mission to promote, encourage and aid scientific investigation and research at UW-Madison.

Since its founding, WARF has helped steward the cycle of research, discovery, commercialization and investment for UW–Madison. Through its patenting and licensing efforts, WARF enables university innovations to advance from the lab to the marketplace.

Each year, WARF contributes more than $100 million to fund additional UW–Madison research. The university refers to WARF's annual gifts as its "margin of excellence" funding. WARF has been issued more than 4,000 patents since 1925 and currently generates 55 revenue-generating licenses on average each year from its active portfolio of 2,200 patents. As of 2024, WARF had an endowment of $3.1 billion.

WARF also works in partnership with a variety of other entities including WiSys Technology Foundation, WiCell Research Institute and the Morgridge Institute for Research.

== WARF inventions ==
UW–Madison research achievements include early discoveries related to vitamin D, development of the blood thinner warfarin (named after WARF), the derivation of stem cells, and algorithms that speed computer processing.

=== Vitamin D ===
In 1923, Harry Steenbock discovered exposure to ultraviolet light increased the Vitamin D concentration in food. After discovering that irradiated rat food cured the rats of rickets, Steenbock sought a patent. Steenbock then assigned the patent to the newly established Wisconsin Alumni Research Foundation. WARF then licensed the technology to Quaker Oats for use in their breakfast cereals. In addition, WARF licensed the technology for use as a pharmaceutical, Viosterol. WARF's commercialization of Vitamin D culminated in its enrichment of milk.

By the time the patent expired in 1945, rickets was all but nonexistent.

Through continued innovations from Hector DeLuca, vitamin D remains an important part of WARF's technology portfolio.

=== Warfarin ===
Warfarin, also known as Coumadin, is named for WARF, and the story of its discovery is emblematic of the "Wisconsin Idea" and the relationship of the university to the Wisconsin public. In 1933 a farmer from Deer Park showed up unannounced at the School of Agriculture and walked into a professor's laboratory with a milk can full of blood which would not coagulate. In his truck, he had also brought a dead heifer and some spoiled clover hay. He wanted to know what had killed his cow. In 1941, Karl Paul Link successfully isolated the anticoagulant factor, which initially found commercial application as a rodent-killer. Warfarin is one of the most widely prescribed medicines in the world, used in vascular and heart disease to prevent stroke and thrombosis.

=== Stem cells ===
More recently, WARF was assigned the patents for non-human primate and human embryonic stem cells. The stem cells were first isolated and purified by James Thomson in 1998.

== Startup companies ==
WARF has been directly involved in the formation of more than 50 startup companies, either through direct investing or by licensing technologies. These companies include Imago, Mirus Bio, Nimblegen, Tomotherapy, Deltanoid Pharmaceuticals, Quinntessence, Neoclone, Silatronix, Third Wave Technologies, Cambria Biosciences, and OpGen, Inc.

== Patent litigation ==
WARF's role is to find companies that can turn original research from the University of Wisconsin–Madison into new products. Like many universities, WARF rarely litigates, but will do so to defend the public good and the rights of the university researchers – the "practicing entities" – who dedicate their careers to groundbreaking science.

In 2014, WARF filed a lawsuit against Apple Inc., alleging that the latter had infringed US 5781752, "Table based data speculation circuit for parallel processing computer", a method of increasing the efficiency of integrated circuits on its Apple A7 and Apple A8 system-on-chip products, and asking for US$862 million as a reasonable royalty. In October 2015, a jury found Apple liable; however, the infringement was found inadvertent, and as such, the court reduced the payment to $234 million. However, in July 2017, the judge added an interest payment to this amount and increased the award to $506 million. On appeal, the Court of Appeals for the Federal Circuit overturned the verdict of the lower court, and concluded that Apple did not infringe WARF's patents. The Supreme Court of the United States denied WARF's writ of certiorari, thus affirming the appellate court's ruling.
