= Inspector De Luca (novel series) =

Inspector De Luca novels
- Carta bianca, the first of the trilogy
- Author: Carlo Lucarelli
- Language: Italy
- Genre: Thriller, Detective
- Publication date: 1990, 1991, 1996
- Publication place: Italy

The Inspector De Luca mysteries, also called the De Luca trilogy, consist of three Italian novels, Carte Blanche (it:Carta bianca (Lucarelli), 1990), The Damned Season (it:L'estate torbida, 1991), and Goose Street (it:Via Delle Oche (1996) by Italian crime fiction writer Carlo Lucarelli.

The novels have been noted for the setting in the period between the collapse of the Fascist government of Italy in 1943 and installation of the Italian Social Republic puppet state of Nazi Germany from 1943 to 1945, and the immediate postwar period, and also for the tenacious attitude of the protagonist policeman - a feature also found in other Lucarelli series.

The novels were adapted for Italian television as Inspector De Luca (TV series) in 2008.
