= Dean & DeLuca =

American chain of upscale grocery stores

Dean & DeLuca, Inc.
- Industry: Retail
- Founded: 1977
- Founders: Joel Dean, Giorgio DeLuca, Jack Ceglic
- Headquarters: Wichita, Kansas
- Number of locations: 37 (2018)
- Products: Specialty food
- Parent: Pace Development
- Website: thedeananddeluca.com

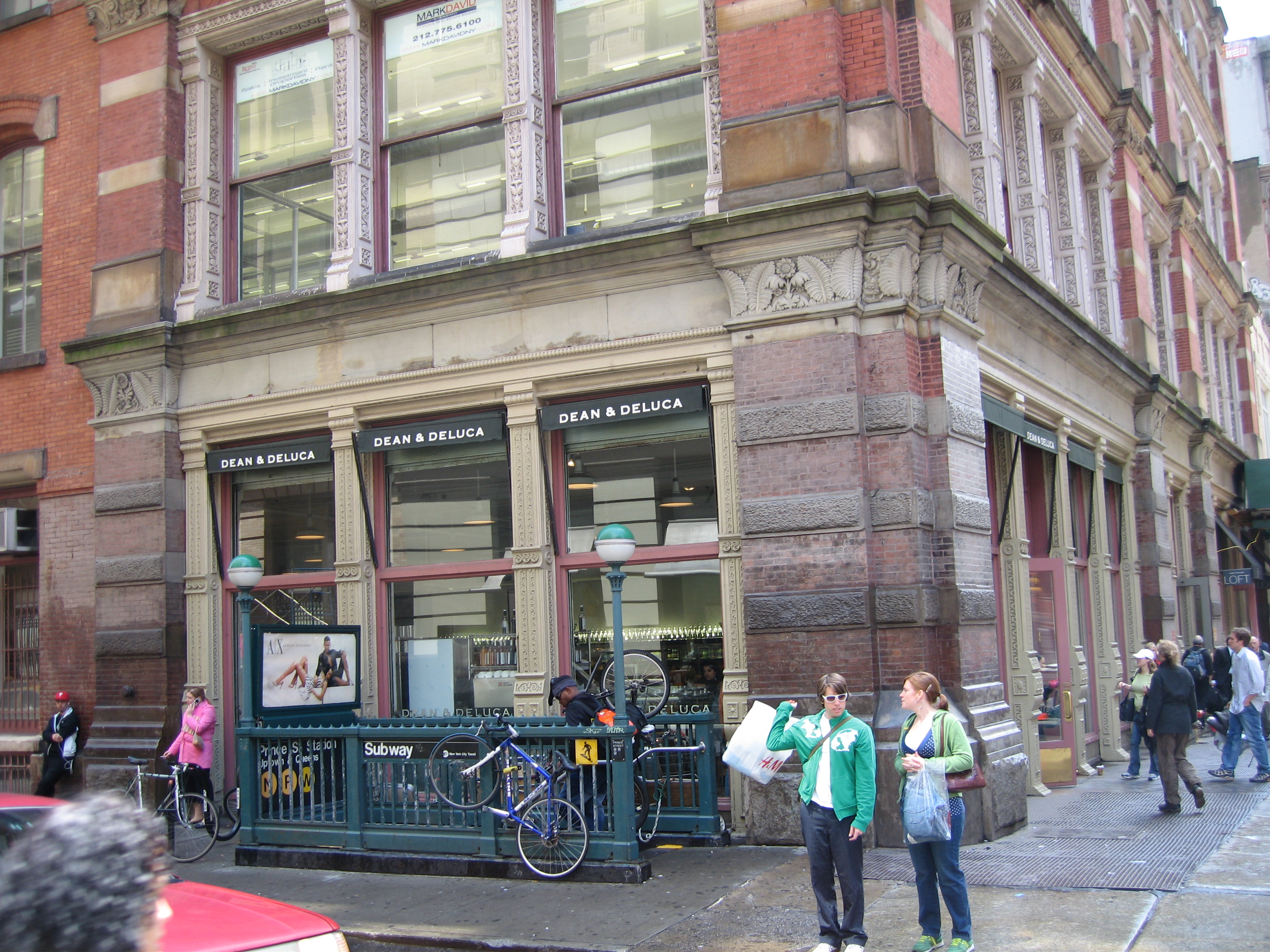
Dean & DeLuca in SoHo, New York

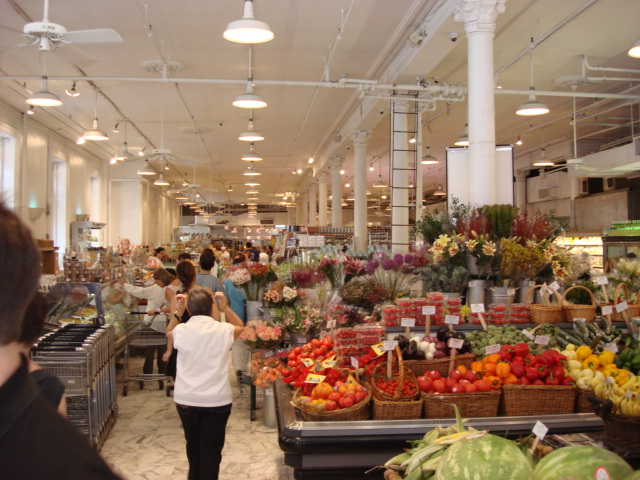
Inside view of the store in SoHo

Dean & DeLuca is an American chain of upscale grocery stores. The first one was established in New York City's SoHo district by Joel Dean, Giorgio DeLuca and Jack Ceglic in September 1977. They were joined in September 1979 by Eugenio Pozzolini, who became a partner in 1981. It is headquartered in Wichita, Kansas. In 2014, Dean & Deluca was acquired by Pace Development, a Thai luxury development company.

== History ==
Giorgio DeLuca, a school teacher turned cheese merchant, and Joel Dean, a publishing business manager, opened the first Dean & DeLuca in September 1977 in SoHo, an area in lower Manhattan, at the corner of Prince and Greene streets. In October 1988, a new flagship market was opened at the corner of Broadway and Prince Streets. Smaller retail outlets followed in Manhattan's Rockefeller Plaza and the Paramount Hotel. Espresso bars were also located around New York and in Washington, DC.

Dean & DeLuca at one time operated locations in New York City; Napa County, California; Washington, D.C.; Charlotte, North Carolina; Leawood, Kansas; Tokyo; Seoul; Bangkok; Dubai; Kuwait; Bahrain; Manila; Taipei; Singapore; Kuala Lumpur; and Macau.

Dean & DeLuca uses a license structure in foreign markets. Dean & DeLuca opened its first international location in Tokyo in 2003 with Itochu Dean & Deluca Japan (currently 50 locations across Japan), followed by MahaNakhon in Bangkok in July 2011 and Orchard Central in Singapore in June 2012. In 2007, they signed their second license agreement in the Middle East with M.H. Alshaya Co. (five locations, including a flagship location in Kuwait City in 2009, one location in Doha, Qatar in May 2010, two locations in Dubai, and one location in Bahrain in 2017). In 2010, Dean & DeLuca signed additional license agreements with Pace Development Thailand (three locations), Shinsegae Korea (two locations), and Mekassa, Turkey.

On July 11, 2019, Dean & DeLuca announced the closing of many of its U.S. locations, bringing the number of stores down to six. According to the company's CRO, the company ceased operating in mid 2019; the remaining stores are franchisees which paid the franchisor $1.5 million in royalties annually.

On April 1, 2020, Dean & DeLuca filed for Chapter 11 bankruptcy protection from creditors with liabilities of as much as $500 million and assets of no more than $50 million. Its owner, Thailand’s Pace Development Corp., defaulted on a total of 9.5 billion Thai baht (about $315 million) of debt in 2019. The primary case is Dean & Deluca New York, Inc. which filed Chapter 11 bankruptcy in the United States District Court for the Southern District of New York. Six affiliated companies also filed bankruptcy.

Dean & DeLuca completed its financial restructuring on January 28, 2021. Siam Commercial Bank acquired a 26.49 percent stake in the company in a debt-for-equity deal. The company said that it was working to restart operations in the United States and around the world.

As of May 2026, the food media publication Caper reported that Dean & DeLuca Brands, Inc. filed a lawsuit over alleged unauthorized products bearing the Dean & DeLuca name and likeness found in supermarkets, including a Manhattan location of Gourmet Garage.
