= Karl Paul Link =

American biochemist

- Born: January 31, 1901; LaPorte, Indiana
- Died: November 21, 1978 (aged 77); Madison, Wisconsin
- Education: University of Wisconsin
- Known for: Discovery of anticoagulant warfarin
- Awards: 1955 Albert Lasker Award for Basic Medical Research 1960 Albert Lasker Award for Clinical Medical Research

Karl Paul Gerhard Link (January 31, 1901 – November 21, 1978) was an American biochemist best known for his discovery of the anticoagulant warfarin.

== Training and early career ==
Link was born in LaPorte, Indiana to a Lutheran minister of German descent as one of ten children. He was schooled locally, and attended the University of Wisconsin, where he studied agricultural chemistry at the College of Agriculture from 1918 to 1925, obtaining an MS in 1923 and a PhD in 1925.

He was then chosen by the National Education Board for a postdoctoral scholarship, and relocated to Europe. He briefly worked with carbohydrate chemist Sir James Irvine at the University of St Andrews in Scotland and from 1926 in Graz, Austria with Fritz Pregl, inventor of microchemistry and Nobel laureate. Finally he spent several months with organic chemist and future Nobel laureate Paul Karrer in the latter's lab in Zurich; during this period Link had tuberculosis, requiring recuperation in Davos. After his return from Europe, he acquired his taste for dressing eccentrically, as he was often seen in large bow ties, flannel shirts, and sometimes a cape.

He was offered an assistant professorship at the University of Wisconsin in 1927, and was promoted to associate professor in 1928. He worked initially on plant carbohydrates and resistance to disease. He married Elizabeth Feldman on September 20, 1930; they had three sons.

== Anticoagulants ==
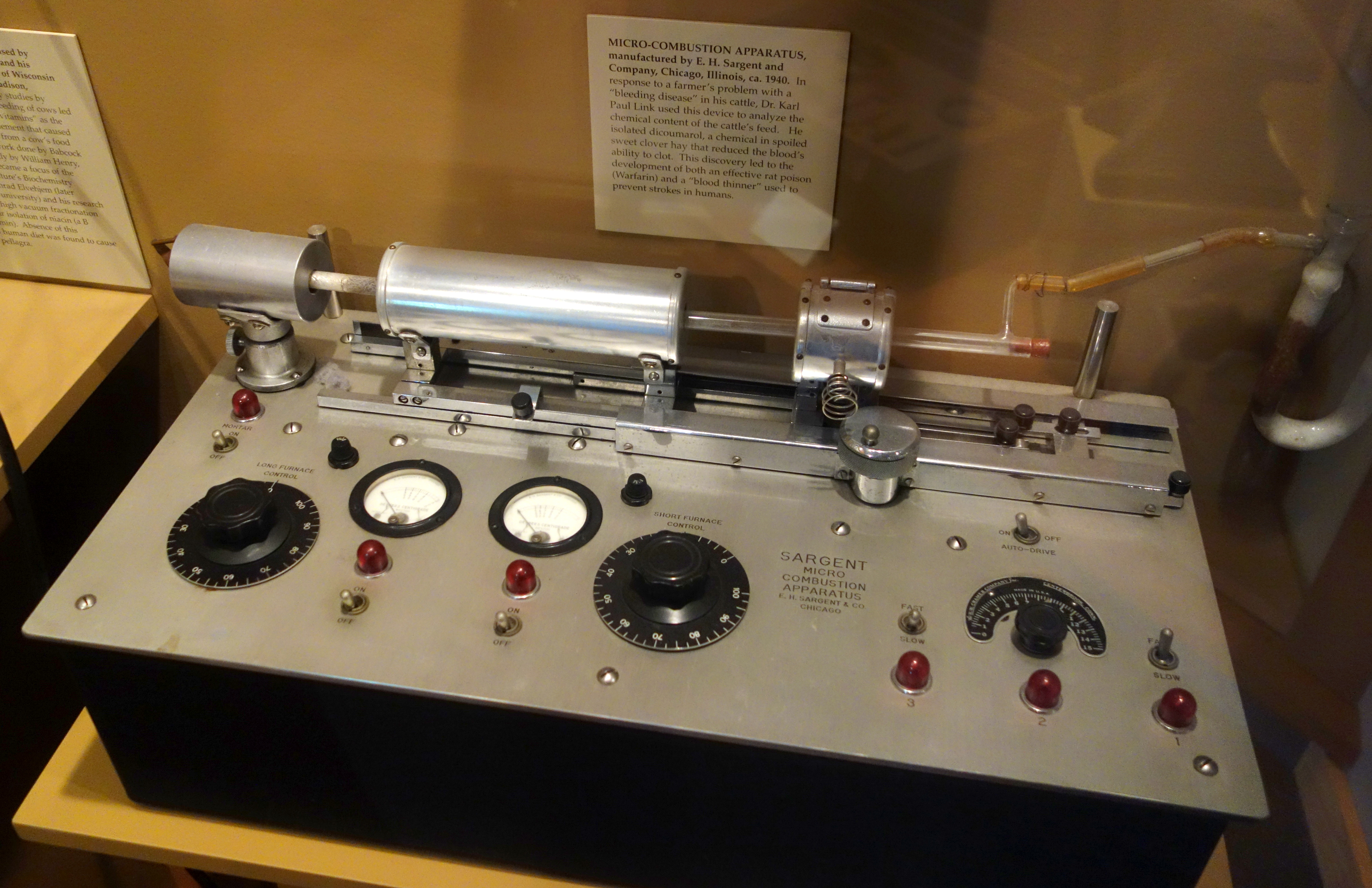
Micro-combustion apparatus, c. 1940, used by Dr. Karl Paul Link to isolate dicoumarol

In the subsequent years, most of his research focused on plant carbohydrates. However, the most fruitful period began when Ed Carson, a Wisconsin farmer, attracted Link's attention to "sweet clover disease", described in 1924 by veterinarian Frank Schofield. In this condition, cows bled to death after consuming hay made from spoilt sweet clover. Carson's stock had been affected, and he brought a dead cow, blood that would not clot, and 100 pounds of sweet clover hay. Under the direction of Link, PhD students Harold Campbell, Ralph Overman, Charles Huebner, and Mark Stahmann crystallized the putative poison—a coumarin-related compound—and synthesized and tested it; it turned out to be dicoumarol (3,3'-methylenebis-(4 hydroxycoumarin)).

Dicoumarol was subjected to clinical trials at Wisconsin General Hospital and the Mayo Clinic. It was for several years the most popularly prescribed oral anticoagulant.

Warfarin, one of the several compounds synthesized as part of the coumarin research, was patented in 1945. The patent was assigned to the Wisconsin Alumni Research Foundation (WARF), for which reason it was given the name Warfarin. Link and researchers Stahmann and Ikawa jointly owned the patent. Initially marketed as rat poison, in the 1950s, warfarin became the second most important anticoagulant for clinical use (after heparin).

== Later years ==
Link was elected to the National Academy of Sciences in 1946. He received several awards for his work, including the 1955 Albert Lasker Award for Basic Medical Research and the 1960 Albert Lasker Award for Clinical Medical Research. He remained closely involved in the biochemistry of warfarin and related compounds.

His work in later years was hampered by poor health (tuberculosis) as he was then relocated to Lake View Sanatorium, and upon his return was never able to fully regain his momentum in research. Nevertheless, he remained a full professor until 1971, when he retired. He was a lifelong pioneer of liberal causes, and his wife was active in the pacifist movement.

Link died from heart failure on November 21, 1978.

== Bibliography ==
- Link, Karl Paul; Tottingham, W. E. (February 1923). "Effects of the method of desiccation on the carbohydrates of plant tissue". Journal of the American Chemical Society. 45 (2): 439–447. doi:10.1021/ja01655a020.
- Campbell, Harold A.; Link, Karl Paul (1941). "Studies on the hemorrhagic sweet clover disease. IV. The isolation and crystallization of the hemorrhagic agent". J Biol Chem. 138: 21–33. doi:10.1016/S0021-9258(18)51407-1.
- Stahmann, Mark Arnold; Huebner, Charles Ferdinand; Link, Karl Paul (1941). "Studies on the hemorrhagic sweet clover disease. V. Identification and synthesis of the hemorrhagic agent". J Biol Chem. 138 (2): 513–527. doi:10.1016/S0021-9258(18)51377-6.
- Link, Karl Paul (January 1959). "The discovery of dicumarol and its sequels" (PDF). Circulation. 19 (1): 97–107. doi:10.1161/01.cir.19.1.97. PMID 13619027. S2CID 21634182.
