= Frank Deluca =

American mobster in Missouri (1898–1967)

Frank DeLuca (April 1, 1898 – May 1967) was an Italian-American mobster who helped control the smuggling and distribution of narcotics in Kansas City, Missouri, for almost four decades.

Born Francesco DeLuca in Giardinello, Sicily, DeLuca migrated to the United States with his brother Joseph Deluca to Kansas City. Frank DeLuca married Lillian Cora Buckner. Frank was arrested for concealed weapons charges, violating the Alien Registration Act, and murder for hire.

By the 1920s, the two brothers were involved with mobster Joseph DiGiovanni in smuggling and narcotics trafficking in the Midwest. Frank was eventually watched by several federal agencies, including the Bureau of Alcohol, Tobacco, Firearms and Explosives (ATF), the Internal Revenue Service (IRS), the Immigration and Naturalization Service (INS) and the U.S. Department of Justice. He also had some legitimate business.

During the 1950s, at Senate Select Committee hearings on organized crime, known as the Kefauver hearings, Frank and Joe were named as two of the "Five Iron Men" of Kansas City in 1952.

== Death ==
Frank Deluca died in May, 1967.
