= Chiara de Luca =

French-Italian actress

Chiara de Luca is a French-Italian actress.

== Biography ==
De Luca grew up in Italy, France and the United States and received a degree in dramatic arts from Tufts University in Boston.

She played a leading role in the film Facechasers directed by Gabriel Judet-Weinshel. The film won the Best Experimental Film Award at the Brooklyn International Film Festival in 2005.

De Luca has appeared in Girl on a Bicycle by director Jeremy Leven, played the role of Marie de Médicis in the French television drama Ce Jour Là, Tout a Changé, and appeared as the student in the film Ever Since the World Ended with Adam Savage.

She has also done work at the Atlantic Theater Company in New York with William H. Macy and at the British American Drama Academy in Oxford with Henry Goodman and Fiona Shaw. De Luca speaks fluent English, Italian and French.

== Filmography ==
- Girl on a Bicycle - Police woman (2013)
- Vagabond Salon (2013)
- Knife Fight - Julia (2012)
- Sport de filles (2011)
- Son va et viens (short) (2011)
- Ce jour là, tout a changé - Marie de Medicis (TV series) (2009)
- Facechasers (short) (2005)
- Ever Since the World Ended - Student (2001)
