= Joseph Deluca =

Italian-American mobster (1893–1952)

Joseph DeLuca
- Born: Giuseppe DeLuca; March 17, 1893
- Died: March 20, 1952 (aged 59)
- Occupation: Mobster
- Relatives: Frank Deluca (brother)

Joseph DeLuca (March 17, 1893 – March 20, 1952) was an Italian-American mobster who controlled the smuggling and distribution of narcotics with his brother Frank DeLuca in Kansas City, Missouri, for almost four decades.

Born Giuseppe DeLuca, DeLuca emigrated with his brother Frank from their native Sicily and eventually found his way to Kansas City, where they became major figures in Kansas City's underworld. Although having several arrests for federal narcotics violations since the 1930s, DeLuca ran a major drug ring operation for mobster Joseph DiGiovanni until his arrest and eventually conviction in 1942, along with seven other members (his girlfriend would be convicted of jury tampering the following year). In 1952, DeLuca and his brother were named two of the "Five Iron Men" of Kansas City by the US Senate Kefauver Committee.
