= Inspector De Luca (TV series) =

Italian television series

- Italian: Il commissario De Luca
- Genre: Detective fiction
- Created by: Carlo Lucarelli
- Starring: Alessandro Preziosi
- Country of origin: Italy
- Original language: Italian
- No. of seasons: 1
- No. of episodes: 4

Production
- Running time: 110 minutes

Original release
- Network: RAI
- Release: 27 April – 11 May 2008

Inspector de Luca (Italian: Il commissario De Luca) is an Italian television series produced and broadcast by RAI, based on the De Luca trilogy (1990-1996) of detective novels by Carlo Lucarelli. The USA DVD box title is Detective De Luca with the tag line, "He's not a fascist/ He's not a partisan/ He's just a cop."

== Concept and scope ==
Covering the period from 1938 to 1948 in Bologna, the series centers on Commissario Achille de Luca, and is set from the height of Fascist era in Italy to the immediate post-war period.

Dashing and attractive to women, De Luca is depicted as an honest cop, a determined and principled policeman working in a corrupt and politically charged environment. While concerned only with truth and justice but not for the bigger picture, he manages to avoid taking sides.

== Production ==
The series comprises four episodes, three of which are based on novels by Lucarelli, while the first serves as an introduction to the character and the milieu. The series was directed by Antonio Frazzi, who also co-wrote the episodes with his brother, Andrea and with Lucarelli. The series was first screened on Italian television in 2008. It was shown in the UK on BBC Four in March and April 2014. It is available on DVD in Italian with English subtitles. The films are dedicated to Andrea (b. Florence, 1944 – d. Florence, 5 May 2006).

== Characters ==
- Alessandro Preziosi: Insp. Achille De Luca, a police detective in northern Italy.(4 episodes)
- Corrado Fortuna: Sgt. Leopoldo Pugliesi, De Luca's assistant. (4 episodes)
- Rolando Raquello: Insp. Roberto Rosseta, a politically astute colleague of De Luca's. (3 episodes)
- Raffaela Rea: De Luca's lover. (2 episodes)
- Stefano Pesce: Guido Leonardi, head of Partisan police. (2 episodes)

== Episodes ==
No.	Title	Based on	Setting	Original release date
1	"Unauthorized Investigation"	(telescript only)	Summer 1938	27 April 2008
When a prostitute is killed, De Luca investigates what he believes to be a cover-up.
2	"Carte Blanche"	Carta Bianca	April 1945	28 April 2008
De Luca heads a murder investigation leading him to probe the private lives of the rich.
3	"The Damned Season"	L'Estate Torbida	June 1945	4 May 2008
On the run after the fall of Mussolini, De Luca is roped into investigating the murder of a local peasant.
4	"Via Delle Oche"	Via Delle Oche	April 1948	11 May 2008
Back in Bologna after Rome, now demoted to Vice, De Luca investigates when a man is found hanged in a brothel.
