= Giorgio DeLuca =

American businessman

Giorgio DeLuca is a founder of the gourmet grocery store Dean & DeLuca ("a landmark for culinary adventurers") with his partner Joel Dean. Before that, DeLuca owned a cheese shop on Prince Street in New York City which he opened in 1973, after a brief career teaching history in the city's public school system.

DeLuca was the owner of the restaurant Giorgione on Spring Street in SoHo, now closed.
