= Luka (Bor) =

Luka Лука Luca
- Village
- Location within Serbia
- Coordinates: 44°10′18″N 22°10′51″E
- Country: Serbia
- District: Bor District
- Municipality: Bor

Population (2022)
  - Total: 430
- Time zone: UTC+1 (CET)
  - Summer (DST): UTC+2 (CEST)

Luka (Serbian Cyrillic: Лука; Romanian: Luca) is a village in the municipality of Bor, Serbia. According to the 2022 census, the village has a population of 430 people, a majority of them Vlachs.
