= Harry Steenbock =

American biochemist

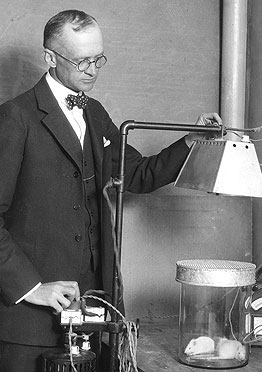
Harry Steenbock in his laboratory, 1923

Harry Steenbock (August 16, 1886 – December 25, 1967) was a professor of biochemistry at the University of Wisconsin–Madison. Steenbock graduated from Wisconsin in 1916, where he was a member of Phi Sigma Kappa fraternity.

== Vitamin D ==
Steenbock was born in Charlestown, Wisconsin, and grew up on a model farm outside New Holstein, Wisconsin. His graduate advisor at the University of Wisconsin–Madison, was Edwin B. Hart. His first publication reported the results of the single-grain experiment on which he assisted with Hart and Stephen Moulton Babcock. During his graduate career, Steenbock also served as an assistant in the lab of Elmer McCollum. When McCollum and another assistant Marguerite Davis published their discovery of what came to be called vitamin A, Steenbock thought he deserved more credit than he received. Steenbock carried on the vitamin A work in Madison, after McCollum accepted an offer from Johns Hopkins University.

In 1923, Steenbock demonstrated that irradiation by ultraviolet light increased the vitamin D content of foods and other organic materials. After irradiating rodent food, Steenbock discovered that the rodents were cured of rickets. It is now known that vitamin D deficiency is a cause of rickets.

Using $300 of his own money, Steenbock patented his invention. Steenbock's irradiation technique was used for food stuffs, but most memorably for milk. By the expiration of the patent in 1945, rickets had all but been eliminated.

== WARF ==
After receiving his patent, the Quaker Oats company offered $1 million (approximately $10 million today) for Steenbock's vitamin D technology. Steenbock thought twice about the offer. Instead of quickly selling his rights to a commercial company, Steenbock believed the money should be returned to the university.

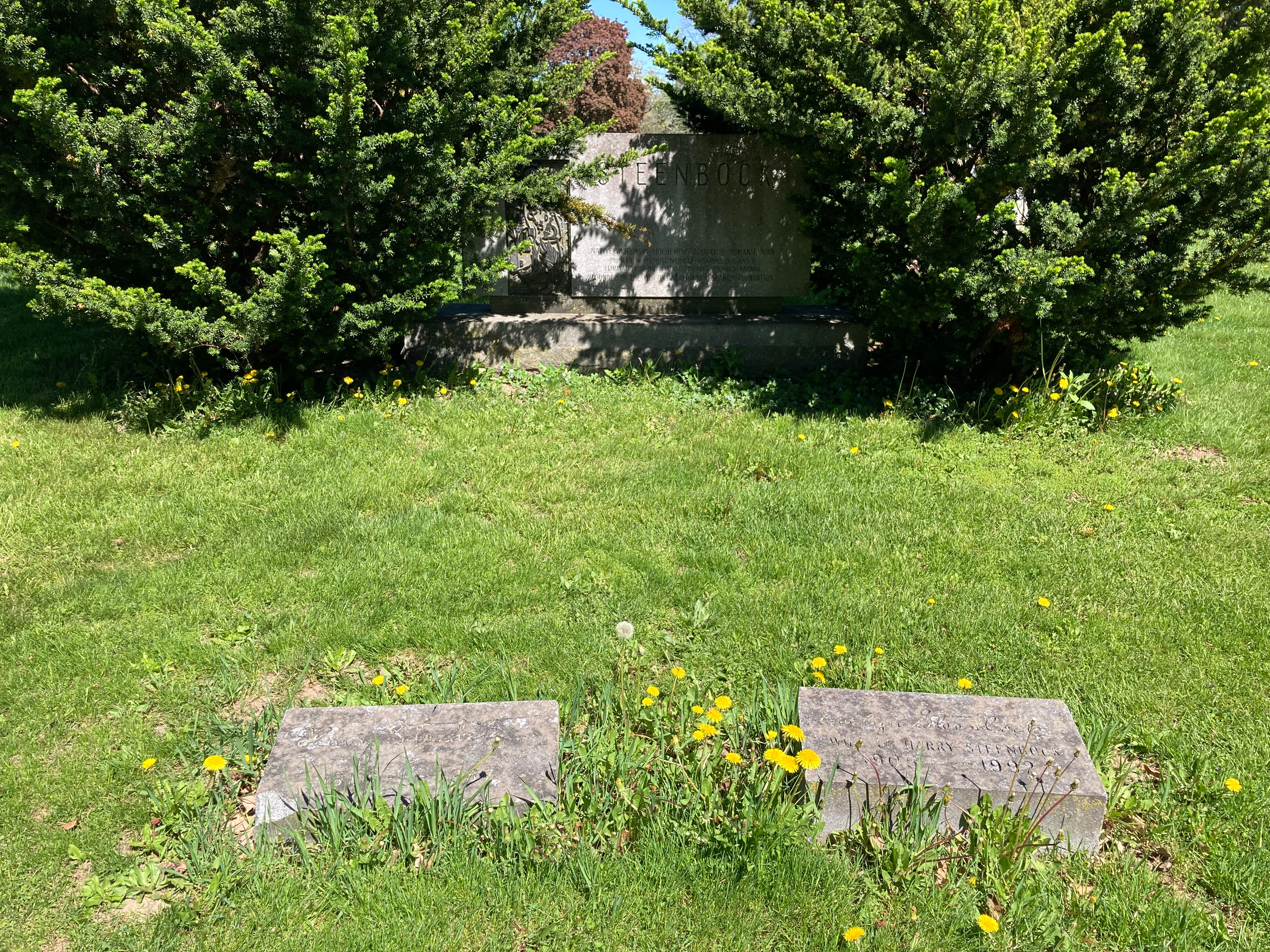
Steenbock's grave at Forest Hill Cemetery

After soliciting interest from nine other University of Wisconsin–Madison alumni, Steenbock was influential in starting the first university technology transfer office, the Wisconsin Alumni Research Foundation (WARF). WARF's initial operating budget was $900, one hundred dollars from each of the nine alumni.

On February 19, 1927, WARF completed its first licensing agreement with the Quaker Oats company. The license permitted Quaker Oats to fortify its breakfast cereals with vitamin D. WARF went on to license the technology to pharmaceutical companies for a medical application, which was known as Viosterol.

== Death and legacy ==
Steenbock died in Madison, Wisconsin, on December 25, 1967. He was buried at Forest Hill Cemetery.

The University of Wisconsin-Madison's Steenbock Memorial Library is named in his honor.

== See also ==
- Wisconsin Alumni Research Foundation
