= Elmer McCollum =

American biochemist (1879–1967)

Elmer McCollum ForMemRS
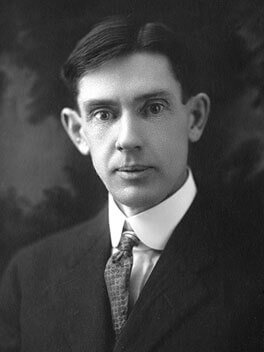
- McCollum at the University of Wisconsin (before 1917)
- Born: Elmer Verner McCollum; March 3, 1879; Redfield, Kansas, United States
- Died: November 15, 1967 (aged 88); Baltimore, Maryland, United States
- Education: University of Kansas; Yale University Ph.D.
- Known for: Discovering Vitamin A, Vitamin B and Vitamin D; Discovering the influence of diet on health; With Cornelia Kennedy, devising the vitamin naming system; Discovered the importance of trace metals in diet
- Awards: Howard N. Potts Medal (1921)
- Scientific career
- Fields: Biochemistry
- Workplaces: University of Wisconsin–Madison Agricultural Experiment Station; Johns Hopkins Bloomberg School of Public Health
- Doctoral advisor: Henry Lord Wheeler, Treat B. Johnson
- Doctoral students: Marguerite Davis, Helen T. Parsons, Harry Steenbock

Elmer Verner McCollum (March 3, 1879 – November 15, 1967) was an American biochemist known for his work on the influence of diet on health. McCollum is also remembered for starting the first rat colony in the United States to be used for nutrition research. Time magazine dubbed him "Dr. Vitamin". His rule was, "Eat what you want after you have eaten what you should."

Living at a time when vitamins were unknown, he asked and tried to answer the questions, "How many dietary essentials are there, and what are they?" He and Marguerite Davis discovered the first vitamin, named A, in 1913. McCollum also helped to discover vitamin B and vitamin D and worked out the effect of trace elements in the diet.

As a worker in Wisconsin and later at Johns Hopkins, McCollum acted partly at the request of the dairy industry. When he said that milk was "the greatest of all protective foods", milk consumption in the United States doubled between 1918 and 1928. McCollum also promoted leafy greens, which had no industry advocates.

McCollum wrote in his 1918 medical textbook (which initially had the title of The Newer Knowledge of Nutrition) that lacto vegetarianism is, "when the diet is properly planned, the most highly satisfactory plan which can be adopted in the nutrition of man".

== Family and education ==
McCollum's ancestors immigrated to the United States from Scotland in 1763. McCollum was born in 1879 to Cornelius Armstrong McCollum and Martha Catherine Kidwell McCollum on a farm 3 miles (5 km) from Redfield, Kansas, usually reported to have been Fort Scott, Kansas, which was 11 miles (18 km) away. His parents had little education but became relatively well-off by local standards.

He spent his first seventeen years on this farm and attended a one-room school. He had one brother, Burton, and three sisters. At some point he had surgery for a detached retina, which the doctors were unable to "glue back again". His father suffered from tuberculosis. His mother, who had only two winters of schooling but was devoted to her children's education, took McCollum and his brother to the 1893 World's Columbian Exposition. All three of his sisters graduated from Lombard University and married Universalist ministers. A lifelong close friend of his brother's, Burton became a geophysicist who helped to pioneer the use of sound waves in oil drilling. In 1896 his mother moved their family to Lawrence, Kansas, where they hoped to profit from a 15 acres (6 ha) fruit farm adjoining the University of Kansas. They planted peach, apple, and plum trees and acres of raspberries and blackberries, all of which took some years to mature.

McCollum failed the general certification examination, but was allowed to enter high school provisionally based on his habit of extensive reading and his memorization of standard poetry. Though extremely shy around girls, he was elected class president in his junior and senior years. He fell in love with the school's Encyclopædia Britannica, purchased a set for $25 (about two months of his earnings), and used it for twenty-five years until he bought a new edition. In high school he joined the Unitarian church. He worked his way through high school and college, including time spent as a gas lamplighter.

While a junior in college, McCollum was elected to Sigma Xi, a non-profit honor society for those interested in science and engineering. As his mother had hoped, McCollum graduated from the University of Kansas in 1903. While there, he abandoned the dream of becoming a doctor, and during his sophomore year, he consumed organic chemistry, earning a bachelor's degree in three years, followed by his master's in 1904. He secured a scholarship to Yale University in 1904, and wrote his thesis on pyrimidines. McCollum got his Ph.D. from Yale in two years. He remained for another year as a postdoctoral researcher working with Thomas Osborne and Lafayette Mendel on plant protein and diet. Then Mendel found a position for McCollum at the University of Wisconsin–Madison, not in his preferred organic chemistry, but as an instructor in agricultural chemistry, where Dennis Robert Hoagland enrolled as a master's student in 1912/1913.

In 1907 he married Constance Carruth, whom he had known in Lawrence. They had five children (Donald, Jean, Margaret, Kathleen, and Elsbeth). The two divorced later in life. When he was living in Baltimore, in 1945, he married J. Ernestine Becker, a dietitian and co-author of one of his books.

== Single-grain experiment ==
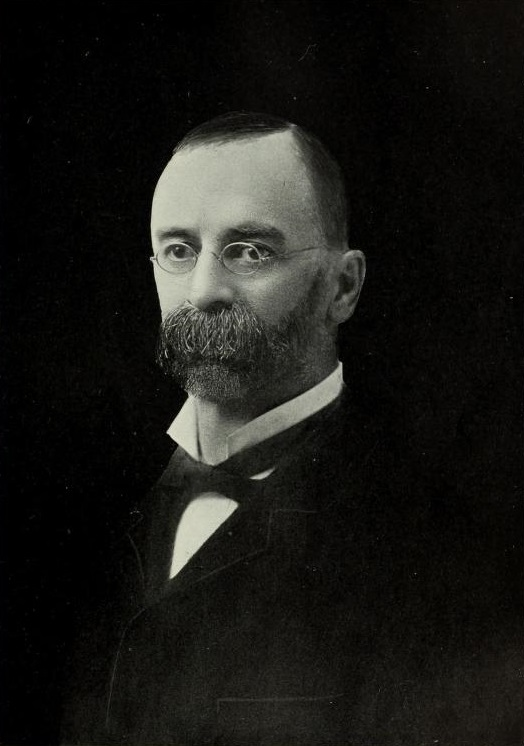
In his autobiography, McCollum attributed his success in nutrition to two people: Stephen Babcock (above) and Marguerite Davis.

In Wisconsin, McCollum was assigned to analyze cow feed and the animal's milk, blood, feces, and urine for the famous single-grain experiment, directed by department chief Stephen Babcock and his successor Edwin B. Hart. The experiment ran for four years until 1911.

Babcock had studied for his Ph.D. at the University of Göttingen in Germany prior to working at the New York State Agricultural Experiment Station and then joining the staff in Wisconsin. During this era, German chemists were trying to create the perfect foods for farm animals. Due to discoveries by Justus von Liebig and others, they thought that any feed that contains a set amount of protein, carbohydrates, fats, salts, and water was equivalent to any other. Babcock did not believe them, and joked with his German colleagues that cows could survive on coal and ground-up leather according to their calculations. After Hart replaced him as department chief in 1906, Babcock and others created an experiment to test his hypothesis.

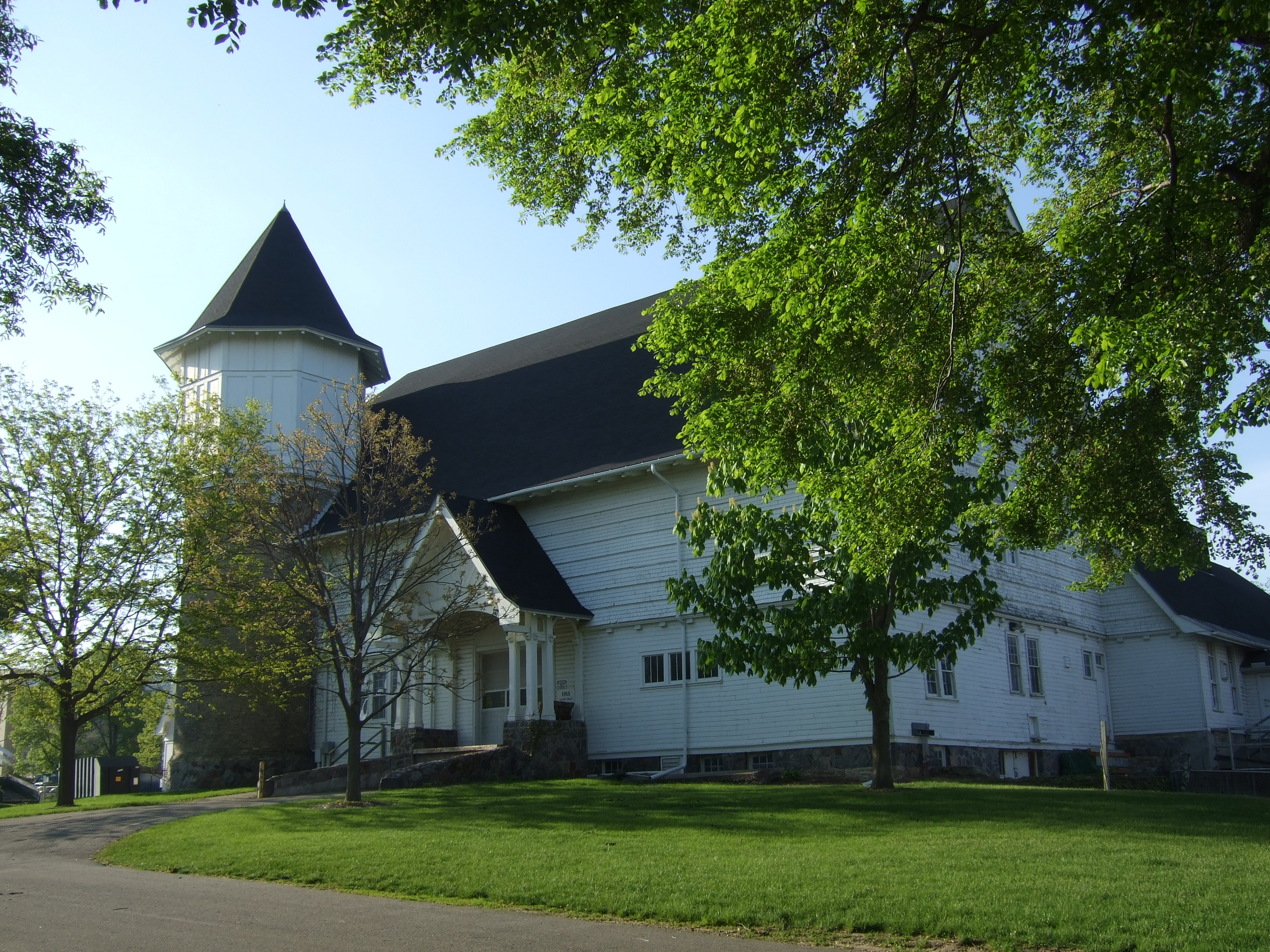
The University of Wisconsin Dairy Barn was the site of the single-grain experiment.

Sixteen calves were purchased on the market. One was part Jersey and one was part Guernsey. Three out of four groups of calves were given feed prepared from a single grain and raised until they had had two pregnancies. One group received wheat, the second received oats, while the third ate only corn. A fourth group received a combination of all three grains. After the first year, only the corn group was thriving, and the others and their young were weak or dying. The wheat group was the worst off, and the oats and mixed groups were in between. Then the weak cows were fed corn. They recovered and bore healthy calves.

Hart and his team published their findings in 1911 in Physiological Effect on Growth and Reproduction of Rations Balanced from Restricted Sources. The researchers and Babcock, the leader, could see the results but, they write, "At present we have no solution for the observations made." McCollum summarized, "something fundamental remained to be discovered."

== Rat colony ==
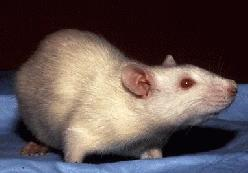
An albino laboratory rat

Searching for a breakthrough in human and animal nutrition, McCollum purchased all thirty-seven volumes of Richard Maly's Jahresbericht Über Die Fortschritte Der Tier-Chemie so he could read them at home. He read of about 13 experiments done between 1873 and 1906 on small animals, often mice, fed restricted diets. In all cases, the animals failed to thrive and died in a few weeks. McCollum determined that he must find out what was lacking in their purified diets, and that he needed to experiment on animals with a short life span, finally deciding on rats. Rats are omnivorous, and cheaply fed, matured quickly, and "had little sentimental and no positive economic value". The dean of the college of agriculture would not support experiments with what he feared was vermin, but Babcock, who was retired, understood the rats' importance and told McCollum to proceed. Using skills he developed with his brother when they were children, McCollum captured some rats from a horse barn, but they were too vicious and wild. He replaced them with twelve young albino rats with some domestication that he bought for $6 from a Chicago pet store. His rat colony, started in January 1908, was the first in America used for nutrition research.

== Early error ==
McCollum decided that some diets failed because they lacked "palatability". He thought that if a diet tasted good, and the animals ate more food, then nutrition would be adequate. In 1911 Osborne and Mendel criticized McCollum's hypothesis and his data, when they found that plant protein diets needed to be supplemented with protein-free milk. Rats would then eat purified diets without flavorings. Further, Mendel and Osborne suggested in their papers that McCollum had been less than careful in his experiments. Embarrassed, McCollum acknowledged his error.

== Discovery of vitamin A ==
He was still responsible for the care of the heifers until 1911, and the care and feeding of his rats fell to a new volunteer, Marguerite Davis, a home economics-turned-biochemistry student who looked out for them daily, unpaid for five years. She earned $600 for her sixth and final year. Davis helped McCollum develop "the biological method for the analysis of food", and she co-authored a number of papers. Among them was "The Necessity Of Certain Lipins In The Diet During Growth" in 1913. They fed rats pure casein, carbohydrates (lactose, dextrine, and/or starch), with a little agar-agar and a mixture of six or seven salts. They substituted lard or olive oil for some of the carbohydrates for a group of rats. For 70 to 120 days, their rats grew, and then they stopped growing. They still appeared to be healthy, except the females did not have enough milk to nourish their young. They successfully restored about thirty rats to normality, after these rats had reached the stage of growth suspension, by adding a small amount of extracts of egg or butter. Their paper included charts for five rats, illustrating their weights over time compared to a normal growth curve, meant to show McCollum and Davis's "almost invariable success in inducing a resumption of growth after complete suspension for a time". One chart showed their results with a fat-free diet. They became convinced that without a substance in the egg or butter extract, rats could not grow, even though they appeared to be healthy.

They concluded that rats stop growing until they are fed certain "ether extracts of egg or of butter", and that "there are certain accessory articles in certain food-stuffs which are essential for normal growth for extended periods". They also found this food factor in extracts of alfalfa leaves and in organ meats. This substance that McCollum called "factor A," was later called vitamin A.

McCollum and Davis, who ultimately received credit for the discovery, submitted their paper for publication three weeks before Osborne and Mendel. Both papers appeared in the same issue of the Journal of Biological Chemistry in 1913. This turned out to be a very close call given that learning about vitamin A took scientists about 130 years, beginning with François Magendie in 1816 through its synthesis in 1947.

Richard Semba has questioned McCollum and Davis's priority claim to the discovery of vitamin A, noting that Carl Socin had suggested the fat-solubility of the relevant dietary factor in 1891, and Wilhelm Stepp had demonstrated a fat-soluble growth factor in 1911. Semba argues that McCollum's 1913 work should therefore be viewed in the context of earlier research on fat-soluble dietary factors.

Davis published with McCollum from 1909 to 1916, and Nina Simmonds did the same from 1916 to 1929. In the space of six years, McCollum was promoted from instructor to assistant professor, associate professor, and then full professor. He thought that a professor succeeds with his students, "by his ability to make his conversations and lectures more interesting than song, dance, drink and fast driving".

== Discovery of vitamin B ==
Looking at beriberi and the problem of polished rice, Christiaan Eijkman and Gerrit Grijns were trying to find the cause of polyneuritis (influenced by Louis Pasteur. Eijkman thought bacteria caused beriberi), but McCollum's approach differed in that he was seeking the reason for failure in growth. McCollum and Davis's experiments with rat diets led to the discovery that Eijkman's and Grijns' anti-neuritic substance was the same as their water-soluble B (B vitamins) in 1915. The finding is number 8 in their list of conclusions, "The water-soluble accessory is not the same one as is furnished by butterfat. 20 percent addition of butterfat does not induce any growth unless the other accessory is supplied." He later found that B is actually combined from many different compounds. In 1916 McCollum and Cornelia Kennedy named the factors with alphabetical letters.

== Opposition to the new word "vitamine" ==
McCollum opposed Casimir Funk's 1912 name vitamines (from vital amines). They thought the prefix "vita" gave the substance too much importance, and that the ending "amine" means something specific in organic chemistry, but they only had scant evidence of one amino group. McCollum and Kennedy write in 1916 in the Journal of Biological Chemistry in their paper "The Dietary Factors Operating in the Production of Polyneuritis" (summarizing what proved to be their incomplete understanding of the time):

"We would, therefore, suggest the desirability of discontinuing the use of the term vitamine, and the substitution of the term fat-soluble A and water-soluble B for the two classes of unknown substances concerned in inducing growth."

In 1920 Jack Drummond noted that the rules of nomenclature include "a neutral substance of undefined composition" ending in "in". Drummond also suggested that the "somewhat cumbrous nomenclature" of fat-soluble A, water-soluble B, etc. (Drummond himself used the expression water-soluble C) stop in favor of vitamins A, B, C, etc., until their nature became known. The word vitamine survived, without its final "e".

== Move to Johns Hopkins ==
McCollum at Johns Hopkins

In 1917 the Rockefeller Foundation established a new Department of Chemical Hygiene at Johns Hopkins University, and the unconventional founder's first two appointments were to non-medical scientists working for agricultural experiment stations. McCollum was offered the chairmanship and a professorship, although he almost didn't get the job. William H. Howell, assistant director of the new school, said, "We had just one misgiving about appointing you to a professorship, McCollum. You look so frail." Indeed, McCollum was six feet tall but weighed only 127 pounds.

McCollum was elected a member of the National Academy of Sciences in 1920. He became emeritus professor in 1945. That same year, he was elected to the American Philosophical Society.

During his over twenty-five years at Johns Hopkins, McCollum published about 150 papers. His work was on fluorine and the prevention of tooth decay, vitamins D and E, and the effect of a slew of trace minerals in nutrition, including aluminum, calcium, cobalt, phosphorus, potassium, manganese, sodium, strontium, and zinc.

McCollum worked with Herbert Hoover's U.S. Food Administration to help those who were starving in Europe following World War I. Hoover sent him on a lecture tour of all the major cities in the western U.S., where McCollum explained that the American diet was of poor quality, and that it would be better to eat organ meats (rather than muscle meats), fewer potatoes, and less sugar.

== Discovery of vitamin D ==
In conversation with John Howland, a Johns Hopkins pediatrician, and later with Howland's staff doctors Edwards A. Park and Paul G. Shipley, they found that rickets could be induced through diet. McCollum's research during the early 1920s found that rats could develop rickets when fed a plain cereal diet. His group tested more than 300 diets on rats, finally finding that cod-liver oil could prevent rickets. Building on the work of Edward Mellanby, who had been inspired by the discovery of vitamin A by McCollum and Davis, McCollum fed animals with induced rickets cod liver oil that was heated and aerated so its vitamin A was destroyed. The oil could no longer cure night blindness but did cure rickets. After his rats recovered, he named the substance for the next free letter of the alphabet, vitamin D. Then they became convinced that sunshine and cod-liver oil both protected against rickets and tested this by carrying rats outside to the sunshine. Soon after, a generation of children grew up on cod-liver oil, and rickets was virtually wiped out.

Harry Day, a colleague and McCollum biographer, writes that finding vitamin D was the work of "a host of investigators" but that McCollum and his group did "much of the groundwork". Kenneth Carpenter, professor emeritus at the University of California, Berkeley, writes in his article "The Nobel Prize and the Discovery of Vitamins" that "strangely" McCollum was not nominated for a Nobel Prize. According to Carpenter, during this era, nominations were made for Eijkman, Funk, Goldberger, Grijns, Hopkins and Suzuki. Eventually, ten awards were made for various contributions to the discovery of vitamins, including to Adolf Windaus for vitamin D.

== Dairy industry ties ==
Like his predecessors at Wisconsin, McCollum was always mindful of the dairy industry. At his suggestion, the National Dairy Council was formed in 1915. While at Johns Hopkins, he was the leader of the National Dairy Products Corporation research laboratory and served as a consultant there, for one hour per day and one evening per week. (National Dairy became Kraft Foods Inc and is known today as Mondelez International and Kraft Heinz.)

An ad for Formulac infant formula appeared in the Journal of the Indiana State Medical Association in 1947. Developed by McCollum and marketed by Kraft Foods, Inc., the formula of concentrated milk contained all known vitamins necessary for "proper infant nutrition".

McCollum wanted milk to be fortified with vitamin D. Today, the National Dairy Council's website welcomes researchers, saying that it was McCollum "who first made the scientific connection between dairy foods and good health".

In 1942 he wrote an article, "What Is the Right Diet?" for The New York Times Magazine. He says there are about forty essential ingredients in the human diet: at least ten of the 22 amino acids, four vitamins (A, D, E, K) that are fat-soluble, nine water-soluble vitamins (C, and various B vitamins), one fatty acid, dextrose, at least thirteen minerals, water, and oxygen. In his article, he pictures five food groups. First among them is dairy, with the label, "Our best all around food...."

Two years before he died, he and his wife attended the fiftieth anniversary of the founding of the National Dairy Council. He then traveled to Atlantic City, New Jersey, where he attended the first awarding of the McCollum Award by what is today the American Society for Nutrition, sponsored by the National Dairy Council.

== Public health advocacy ==
He gave the Harvey Lectures in 1917, with the title, "The Supplementary Relations among Our Common Foodstuffs".

McCollum's textbook The Newer Knowledge of Nutrition (1918) influenced many dietitians and went through multiple editions coauthored by Nina Simmonds and Elsa Orent-Keiles. In this book he introduced his idea of "protective foods". He wrote that the American diet was of poor quality because it had too much "white flour or cornmeal, muscle meats, potatoes, and sugar". He encouraged a daily quart of milk and plenty of green, leafy vegetables. Not surprisingly, McCollum also promoted lacto-vegetarianism. The fifth and final edition of his textbook appeared in 1939.

Under the title "Our Daily Diet", between 1922 and 1946 McCollum wrote about 160 columns for McCall's magazine. He tackled topics like, "Are there such things as nerve foods?" and "Green vegetables are unbottled medicines."

McCollum was the nutrition editor of the magazines McCall's and Parents. He was on the editorial boards of the Journal of Nutrition, the Journal of Biological Chemistry, and Nutrition Reviews.

Long interested in the effect of diet on the teeth, McCollum was awarded medals by the Connecticut and Ohio dental societies and was a fellow of the New York society as well as an honorary member of the American Academy of Dental Medicine. His paper "The Effect Of Additions Of Fluorine to the Diet Of The Rat On the Quality Of the Teeth" (1925) described how excessive florine would negatively affect dental health in rats. Nonetheless, McCollum would later become a supporter of water fluoridation from the beginning of recorded evidence for the intervention. In 1938 the U.S. Public Health Service reported that adding fluoride to drinking water resulted in fewer dental caries. McCollum was moderator of "The Cause and Prevention of Dental Caries", sponsored by the Good Teeth Council for Children, Inc., that same month. His 1941 article "Diet in Relation to Dental Caries" claimed that vigorous chewing exercises teeth to retain optimum health, that chewing foods has a deterrent effect, and that "protective action of excessive fat in the diet may possibly be due to greasing the tooth surface and the cavity surface".

As a new member of the Food and Nutrition Board, McCollum was part of the decision in 1941 to enrich bread and flour with thiamine, niacin, and iron. McCollum was critical of the decision; while he agreed that white bread has nutritional deficiencies, he felt that this action did not compensate for all of the nutrients that are stripped away by milling. In the ensuing controversy, McCollum's status was changed from "board member" to "panel member" and he was no longer invited to board meetings. For years, he continued to think his own plan of adding "nonfat milk solids, brewer's yeast, and wheat and corn germs" was superior to the plan as enacted.

As he became a public figure, McCollum often gave lectures, some of which were mentioned in the press. In 1932 he told the New York Academy of Medicine that, when mother rats were deprived of vitamin B, their young were about "half as quick in mental alertness" as young rats whose mothers were not deprived of vitamin B.

In 1934 he told The New York Times, "We have proved the necessity for [magnesium] in human food, but in very small amounts. Too much results in dopiness. I would say you can't have a sweet disposition without magnesium, but that does not prove that you will have one when you take plenty."

According to The New York Times, in 1936 he asked an audience of four hundred doctors at the Kings County Medical Society in Brooklyn to help investigate the "extravagant claims" being made for some medicinal preparations. He thought that doctors could stop false advertising by immediately establishing the facts of each new discovery. McCollum then gave a long list of dos and don'ts with vitamins A and B.

In 1937 he told an audience at the University of Buffalo that a lack of maternal instincts is due to a deficiency in manganese. When the rat was fed a small amount of manganese chloride, the mothering instinct returned immediately.

== Health ==
At seven months of age, McCollum fell ill with what we know today as scurvy when his mother became pregnant. She weaned him on mashed potatoes and boiled milk. The boy was slowly dying, and had painful sores, bleeding gums, and swollen joints. One day while his mother was peeling apples, McCollum started to suck on the peels. When on the following day he felt a little better, she fed him more apple skins. When spring came, she gave him other fruits and vegetables. McCollum completely recovered from scurvy, but his teeth caused him trouble for the rest of his life. Finally, in 1926 he had all his teeth removed and got dentures. His health improved.

McCollum suffered from diverticulitis, and was often in pain. He had a number of operations, and finally his descending colon was removed. Again his health improved.

McCollum was blind in his left eye because of a detached retina that doctors were unable to repair.

McCollum expressed the wish "that in my old age I want to keep my mind in a state of continual adventure". He got his wish by living twenty-three years in retirement, twenty-two of them in good health.

== Retirement and death ==
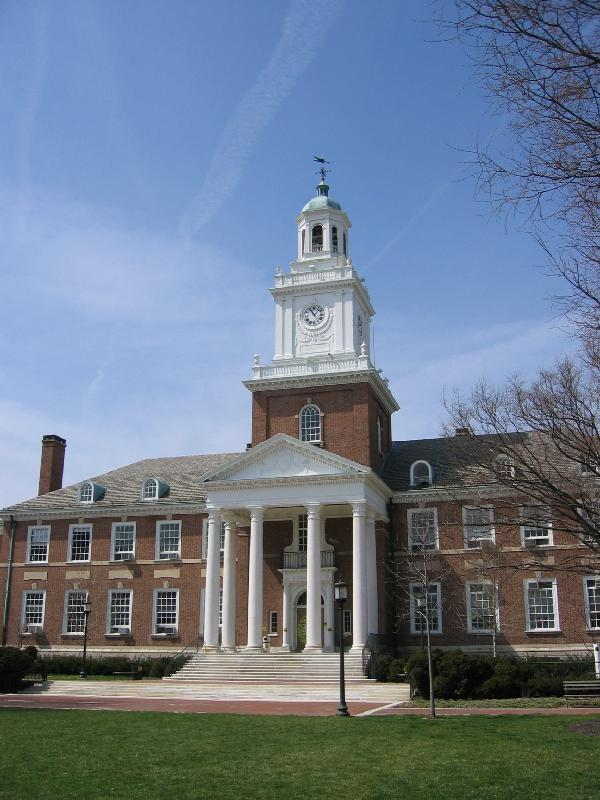
Gilman Hall, site of McCollum's office in retirement

After his 1944 retirement as professor emeritus, he spent ten years writing The History of Nutrition; he also wrote his autobiography, From Kansas Farm Boy to Scientist. McCollum donated his honoraria from prizes and from lecturing to a student loan fund at the University of Kansas that was eventually worth $40,000.

In 1943 McCollum gave the American Dietetic Association, known today as the Academy of Nutrition and Dietetics, a donation that became the foundation's scholarship fund. Now the largest provider of dietetic scholarships, the foundation awards $1,500,000 over three years to about one thousand students.

McCollum criticized drugstore vitamin supplements as being no better than old-time patent medicines.

In 1947 John Lee Pratt gave $500,000 to Johns Hopkins for the study of trace inorganic elements in life. The McCollum-Pratt Institute formed, and Pratt donated another $1 million. McCollum did not participate beyond giving lectures, but he selected the first director, William McElroy. In 1951 Johns Hopkins held a two-day symposium called "The Physiological Role of Certain Vitamins and Trace Elements"; fifteen scientists delivered papers and many of his students and former colleagues returned to see him.

About two hundred people contributed several thousand dollars for the painting of an oil portrait of McCollum by Paul Trebilcock in 1954. The work hangs in the lobby of the Alan Mason Chesney Medical Archives at Johns Hopkins.

While working with Olaf S. Rask ten years before he retired, McCollum began to search for ways to separate specific amino acids from protein hydrolysates. When he retired, he worked on this project exclusively. He had a small laboratory at Johns Hopkins's Homewood Campus and an assistant, Mrs. Agatha Ann Rider. In retirement, he produced six papers and three patents, the last one issued to him and Rider on March 15, 1960, for the purification of glutamine.

In 1961 he was elected a foreign member of the Royal Society.

In 1965 the University of Kansas named a ten-story dormitory, McCollum Hall, after McCollum and his brother Burton. The building housed about nine hundred students for fifty years until it was demolished in 2015. Each of them sat for a portrait painted by Kansas artist Daniel MacMorris. The portraits hung side by side in the foyer. After the demolition, McCollum's portrait was moved to the School of Pharmacy, and Burton's went to the Kansas Geological Survey.

One issue became especially important to him, and he wrote dozens of his friends asking what could be done about it. He thought the country was losing its potassium and phosphorus, and he wanted to find a way to recycle them instead of throwing them in our sewage.

In 1965 he and his wife traveled so he could speak at the fiftieth anniversary of the appointment of Agnes Fay Morgan to the faculty of the University of California, Berkeley. The following year, he was unable to attend the 100th anniversary of the University of Kansas in 1966 because of physical disability.

His house in Baltimore was broken up into apartments but nevertheless became a National Historic Landmark. The American Society for Nutrition offers a McCollum lectureship.

McCollum died on November 15, 1967, at the age of 88. Shortly before his death, he remarked: "I have had an exceptionally pleasant life and am thankful."

== Misconduct allegations ==
Richard Semba's 2012 paper "The Discovery of the Vitamins" and his 2012 book "The Vitamin A Story" discuss allegations of research misconduct by McCollum at the University of Wisconsin. Semba cites a 1918 letter written by Edwin B. Hart, chair of the University of Wisconsin department of agricultural chemistry, to the journal Science. Hart states in this letter, which was published under the title "Professional Courtesy", that a paper co-authored by McCollum and Nina Simmonds, "A Study of the Dietary Essential, Water-Soluble B, in Relation to its Solubility and Stability Towards Reagents", is actually the work of Harry Steenbock, who is mentioned only in a footnote and is thus the victim of a "gross injustice". Further, Hart says that all the records of rat feeding at Wisconsin disappeared during the change of staff.

In his book, Semba mentions a recollection attributed to Harry Steenbock that McCollum released the rats from their cages when he left Wisconsin in 1917, which Semba characterizes as an act of sabotage. The account was conveyed to Semba in 2009 by Hector DeLuca, who said he had heard it from Steenbock. No contemporary account of the alleged incident has been identified; Hart's 1918 letter to Science, while critical of McCollum's conduct during his move to Johns Hopkins, does not mention the release of the rats.

== Books ==
- McCollum, E. V. (1917). A Text-book of Organic Chemistry for Students of Medicine and Biology. Macmillan via Internet Archive.
- — (1918). The Newer Knowledge of Nutrition: The Use of Food for the Preservation of Vitality and Health (1 ed.). Macmillan via Internet Archive.
- — (1957). A History of Nutrition: The Sequence of Ideas in Nutrition Investigations (1 ed.).
- — (1964). From Kansas Farm Boy to Scientist. Lawrence: University of Kansas Press. ISBN 978-0-7006-0091-5.
- McCollum, E. V.; Simmonds, Nina (1920). The American Home Diet: An Answer to the Ever-Present Question: What Shall We Have for Dinner. Detroit: Frederick C. Mathews Co. via Internet Archive.
- McCollum, E. V.; Simmonds, Nina (1925). Food, Nutrition and Health (1 ed.). The authors.

== Bibliography ==
- Chick, D. H.; Peters, R. A. (1969). "Elmer Verner McCollum 1879–1967". Biographical Memoirs of Fellows of the Royal Society. 15: 159–171. doi:10.1098/rsbm.1969.0008. S2CID 72039324.
- Day, Harry G. (1974). "Elmer Verner McCollum". Biographical Memoirs of the National Academy of Sciences. 45: 263–335. PMID 11615648.
- Kruse, H. D. (1961). "Citation and presentation of the Academy Medal to Elmer Verner McCollum". Bulletin of the New York Academy of Medicine. 37 (4): 229–234. PMC 1804669. PMID 13754631.
- McCollum, Elmer Verner (1964). From Kansas Farm Boy to Scientist. Lawrence: University of Kansas Press.
- Rider. Agatha Ann (January 1970). "Elmer Verner McCollum: A Biographical Sketch (1879–1967)" (PDF). The Journal of Nutrition. 100 (1): 1–10. doi:10.1093/jn/100.1.1. PMID 4904501.
