= Helen Parsons =

American biochemist (1886–1977)

Helen T. Parsons
- Born: March 26, 1886; Arkansas City, Kansas
- Died: December 30, 1977 (aged 91); Madison, Wisconsin
- Education: Kansas State Agricultural College (B.A.); University of Wisconsin-Madison (M.S.); Yale University (Ph.D.)
- Known for: B vitamins
- Scientific career
- Fields: Biochemistry, Nutrition, Home economics
- Workplaces: University of Wisconsin-Madison
- Doctoral advisor: Lafayette Mendel
- Other academic advisors: Elmer McCollum

Helen Tracy Parsons (March 26, 1886 – December 30, 1977) was an American biochemist and nutritionist chiefly known for her early work in vitamin B. Parsons developed an interest in biochemistry and nutrition at the University of Wisconsin-Madision, where she was a graduate student under Elmer McCollum. Parsons spent most of her own scientific career at the University of Wisconsin-Madison in their Home Economics department. After her retirement, she was named a fellow of the American Institute of Nutrition (AIN) in 1959, one of only three women to be so honored. Parsons is well known for her early work on eggs, which was critical to the discovery of biotin and avidin in 1940. Her later work on thiamine depletion by live yeast was crucial in helping to stop the sale of raw yeast cocktails as a nutritional supplement.

== Early life and education ==
Helen Tracy Parsons was born on March 26, 1886, in Arkansas City, Kansas. Her father was a physician who came from a pioneer family in Indiana and her mother was born at a mission house to Mohegan Native Americans in New England. Both her mother's and father's family believed in education and encouraged scholarly thinking for her and her sister.

At five years old Parsons began attending the second ward school in Arkansas City, where her aunt was the principal. She moved with her aunt and uncle to Alabama, where she attended a co-ed military high school. Parsons returned to Arkansas City at age sixteen to teach at a country school. After several years of teaching, Parsons left the school to attend summer session at a teachers’ college in Pittsburg, Kansas. It was here that she was first introduced to the budding field of home economics and decided to enroll at Kansas State Agricultural College in 1911. While in college, Parsons was introduced to chemistry and physiology through home economics classes. She described the "enriching [combination] of home economics with science" as "a very potent thing" and switched from wanting to become a Latin teacher to wanting to pursue both home economics and science.

== Graduate education and early research ==
After another brief teaching job in Oklahoma, Parsons met Abby Marlatt, head of the Home Economics department at the University of Wisconsin-Madison, at a dinner party in 1913. Marlatt offered her an assistant job at the University of Wisconsin-Madison where Parsons was intended to be the “bridge between science and home economics”. Parsons matriculated in the University of Wisconsin-Madison in 1913 where she began taking biochemistry classes with Elmer McCollum, who at the time was doing original work on vitamins A and B. Parsons credits McCollum with teaching her how to do research, describing him as “a very sympathetic teacher” and “very patient with [her] not knowing anything at all”. Parsons began pursuing her master's degree under McCollum and received one in 1916 at age 20. Published in 1918, her thesis helped show that the dietary properties of the potato closely resemble those of cereal grains.

In 1917, McCollum moved to head the biochemistry department at the newly established Johns Hopkins School of Hygiene and Public Health, where Parsons chose to follow. Working in McCollum's lab, Parsons had access to the nation's first colony of white rats for use in nutrition experiments. At Johns Hopkins, Parsons worked with McCollum on many topics pertaining to vitamins, and published her own early study on vitamin C metabolism in rats. At the time, vitamin C had not yet been isolated or chemically identified. However, Parsons had noticed that humans and other primates required an anti-scurvy, or anti-scorbutic, supplement to their diet while rats did not. By putting rats on an anti-scorbutic diet and then feeding their livers to guinea pigs suffering from scurvy, Parsons found that the diet cured guinea pigs of their scurvy, suggesting that there was an anti-scorbutic substance, which we now know as vitamin C, that was synthesized in the rats’ livers. After three years at Johns Hopkins, Parsons was offered a faculty position as an assistant professor at the University of Wisconsin-Madison and she returned to the department of Home Economics in 1920.

During this time and until after the late 1920s, the department of Home Economics was not allowed to have Ph.D. candidates. According to Parsons, the Home Economics department was seen as more of a trade school, one where "people did cooking and sewing", and the administration did not want the university "smirched with a trade school reproach". Accordingly, Parsons was forced to pursue her Ph.D. elsewhere.

== Doctoral studies ==
Around 1927, Parsons went to obtain her Ph.D. under the direction of Lafayette Mendel, a biochemical nutritionist working out of the Yale Physiological Chemistry Laboratory. In Parsons’ second year there, she was awarded the Mary Pemberton Nourse Fellowship from the American Association of University Women. Her thesis involved studying the effect of high protein diets on reproduction and kidney function in rats. She found that when fed powdered or raw egg white, rats developed dermatitis and neurological dysfunction. She would take these results back with her to the University of Wisconsin-Madison and continue her research on what she termed “egg white injury” in her own lab. Her work on this topic later proved crucial in helping to identify biotin and avidin. Parsons’ graduated with her doctoral degree from Yale in 1928 at the age of 42, after which she returned to the University of Wisconsin-Madison as an associate professor.

== University of Wisconsin-Madison ==
Parsons returned to the University of Wisconsin-Madison in 1928 as an associate professor with an annual salary of $3600 and research funding from the university for her own laboratory. There, she was able to expand work done during her doctoral period and perform experiments critical to the discovery of biotin and avidin, as well thiamine depletion by yeast.

=== Studies in egg white injury and biotin ===
Parsons had noticed during her time at Yale that rats fed only raw egg-white as their protein diet developed unfavorable physiological effects such as severe dermatitis and neurological dysfunction. If kept on the diet, the rats invariably died after a short period of time. Parsons hypothesized that there was an 'anti-vitamin' in the egg-white (later discovered to be avidin) that was abstracting and binding a key nutrient (later discovered to be biotin) in the rats digestive tract, giving rise to these adverse symptoms. A series of further experiments in 1933 proved that the anti-vitamin responsible for egg white injury was a protein that could be destroyed during peptic digestion or through exposure to hydrochloric acid.

Parsons and her group then went on to look for foods that could counteract the symptoms of egg-white injury. They found that foods like cooked kidney, cooked liver, yeast, egg yolk, or dried milk contained a 'protective factor' (later found to be biotin) that cured the rats dermatitis and prevented the debilitating effects of egg-white consumption. They went on to partially purify the factor and showed that the amount needed to cure symptoms was proportional to the amount of egg-white fed. Although ultimately unable to chemically identify the protective factor, Parsons' early work on the subject was crucial to the later identification of biotin by Paul Gyorgy in 1940. In a 1959 letter to Parsons, Gyorgy wrote:

"It was you, my dear Doctor Parsons, who gave me the best stimulus to unravel the difficult problem of egg-white toxicity and biotin deficiency. Your excellent and classical experiments on the identification of bound biotin in the feces of rats fed raw egg-white opened the way to solve the puzzle of egg-white toxicity. I am still grateful to you for giving us the light to see the things in proper perspective."

At the time, Parsons' egg-white results were controversial within the egg and poultry industry. She recalls being "insulted at the time any of [her] reports" were given at meetings and her results were often called into question by those involved with the industries.

=== Thiamine depletion by yeast ===
Parsons' later career revolved around thiamine depletion by live yeast. In the late 1930s and 1940s, it was popular to drink live yeast cocktails. Many yeast companies marketed the mixtures as a good source of nutrients and proteins. However, after talking with her colleagues, Parsons began to question validity of the cocktails. She began her own experiments into the matter after receiving funding from a yeast company in Milwaukee to try and prove the nutritional benefits of live yeast. She began feeding live yeast to human subjects on a diet rich in thiamine and found that live yeast cocktails sharply decreased the amount of urinary thiamine in subjects. In contrast, dead, boiled yeast had no effect on thiamine levels. Parsons' also found that live yeast recovered from subjects' feces had large amounts of stored thiamine, indicating that thiamine depletion was caused by a withholding process by the viable yeast and not from destruction within the digestive system. Thiamine stores were quickly regained by stopping the consumption of live yeast.

Although the yeast company she was working for was not happy with the results, they allowed Parsons to publish her findings. Some of her colleagues were not as fortunate - in her oral history Parsons recalls some of their research being suppressed by the larger yeast companies and their papers cancelled for publication. During her work with yeast, Parsons had extensive communication with the companies involved in selling yeast, as well as Food and Drug Administration (FDA) authorities who were responsible for the regulation in the sale of nutritional supplements. Her research sparked a fierce debate over nutrition and yeast, culminating in a threatened lawsuit by the FDA against the yeast companies and the banning of advertisements for yeast cocktails.

== Later years ==
Parsons retired from the University of Wisconsin-Madison in 1956 at the age of 70. She remained active in the American Institute of Nutrition, the American Society of Biological Chemists, the American Dietetics Association, and the American Home Economics Association. She was 1 of 112 charter members of the American Institute of Nutrition (now known as the American Society for Nutrition), which was the first scientific society dedicated solely to the discipline of nutrition and in 1959, was one of three women to be named a fellow of the society. Parsons never married and had no children. She was an avid gardener and during her retirement, became a member of many community gardening clubs. Parsons died on December 30, 1977, at her home in Madison, Wisconsin at the age of 91.
