= Franklin C. Bing =

American biochemist, advisor and archivist

Franklin Church Bing
- Born: December 29, 1902; Pennsylvania, United States
- Died: October 17, 1988 (aged 85); Upper Sandusky, Ohio, US
- Education: Ursinus College; University of Pennsylvania
- Known for: Seminal contributions to Biochemistry
- Spouse: Catherine Payne
- Children: 1
- Scientific career
- Fields: physiological chemistry
- Workplaces: Case Western Reserve University; American Medical Association
- Doctoral advisor: Lafayette B. Mendel

Franklin Church Bing (29 December 1902 – 17 October 1988) was an American biochemist, advisor and archivist. He was born in the United States. He got his PhD in the physiological chemistry department of Yale University in 1930. After that he joined the Western Reserve University between 1929 and 1936 and became a faculty member in the department of Biochemistry. After many years of studying, in later career, he joined the American Medical Association (AMA) and became a scientific researcher from 1936. Then between 1943 and 1950, Bing worked for the American Institute of Baking in Chicago. From 1950 to 1952, he worked as an advisor to the Delaney Committee of the United States House of Representatives. Since then, he has become an independent food and drug advisor for private businesses and government agencies. In 1985, Bing became an archivist and worked for the American Institute of Nutrition. At the same time, he wrote several biographies for many nutritionists. Bing was a nutritionist, scientist and a chemist and he had studied and made many contributions to these related fields during his whole life.

== Early life and education ==
=== Early life and family (1902–1919) ===
Franklin Church Bing was born in 1902 in North Wales, Pennsylvania, America. His mother, Alice Church, was a mixture of Scottish and French. His father was Franklin Howard Bing and he was a craftsman who made Musical Instruments. Then Bing grew up around Philadelphia and he had four younger brothers. He studied in a senior high school in Philadelphia, Frankford area. In high school, he was inspired by his science curriculum to pursue a later scientific career. Bing studied chemistry at Yale University to get his PhD until 1930. In that period, he met his wife Catherine Payne. She was a pediatric nurse working at Grace New Haven Hospital. Then they fell in love and married and after a few years, they had a child, named as John Howard. During the time he met and lived with his wife, he wrote many poems for her.

=== Education ===
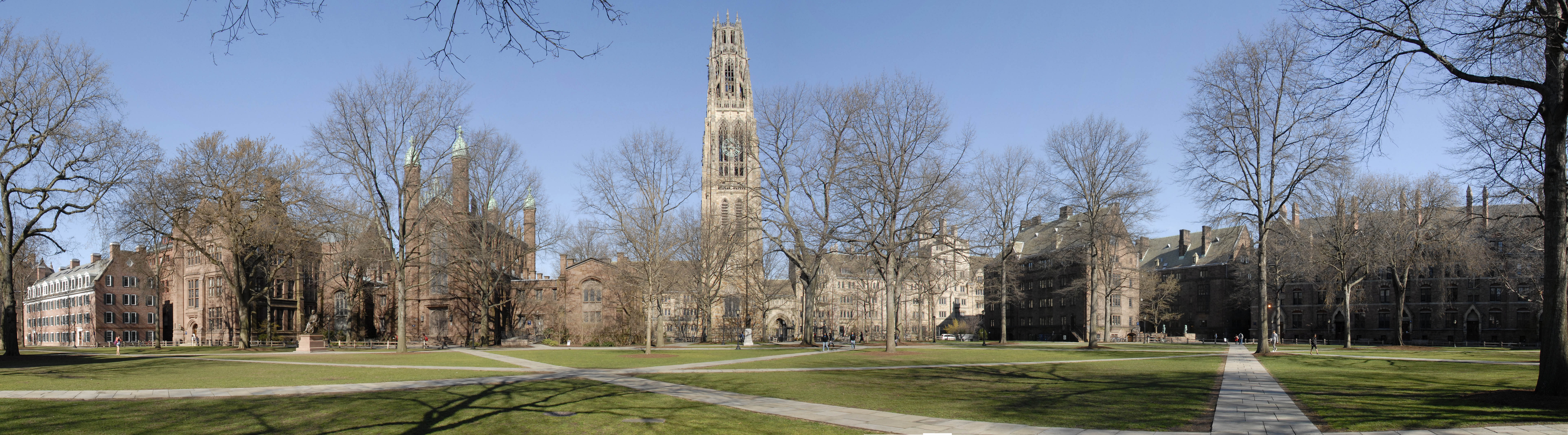
Yale Campus

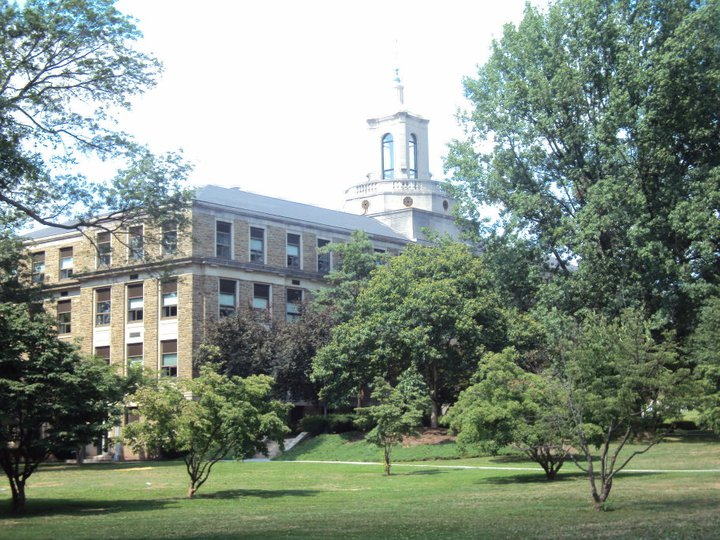
Pfahler Hall of Science Ursinus College

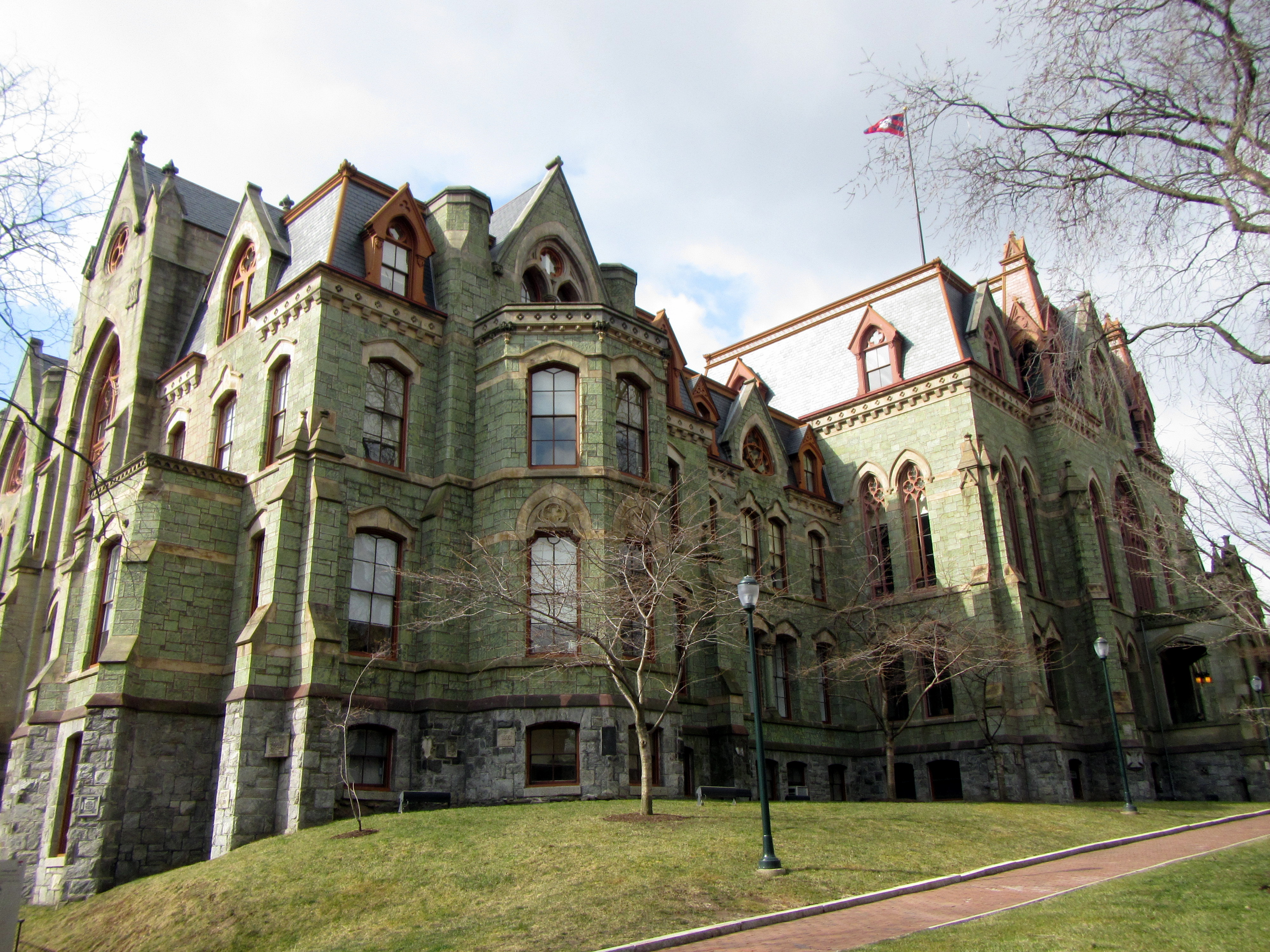
University of Pennsylvania

After graduating from the high school, Bing studied in the Ursinus College during 1920. Then he left the Ursinus College after 1 year's study and then transferred to the University of Pennsylvania to study biology and chemistry in 1921. In 1924, he earned his bachelor's degree of the University of Pennsylvania. After that, he had been a biology and chemistry teacher for a year at the Davis and Elkins College. Then he studied chemistry in the physiological chemistry department of Yale University and got his PhD of this major in 1930. In 1928, he studied at the Yale University and published his first history essay in the University in the 'Scientific Monthly'. The journal article introduced an early American scientist-John Lining. He did many experiments on metabolism and he had his own viewpoints on epidemics. In order to improve his academic background in physiological chemistry, he attended a summer course in physiology at the Woods Hole University. During the summer camp, he met and lived with Eugene Markley Landis, an upperclassman. Eugene became one of Bing's friends and taught Bing to be persistent in his academic research

== Work experience ==
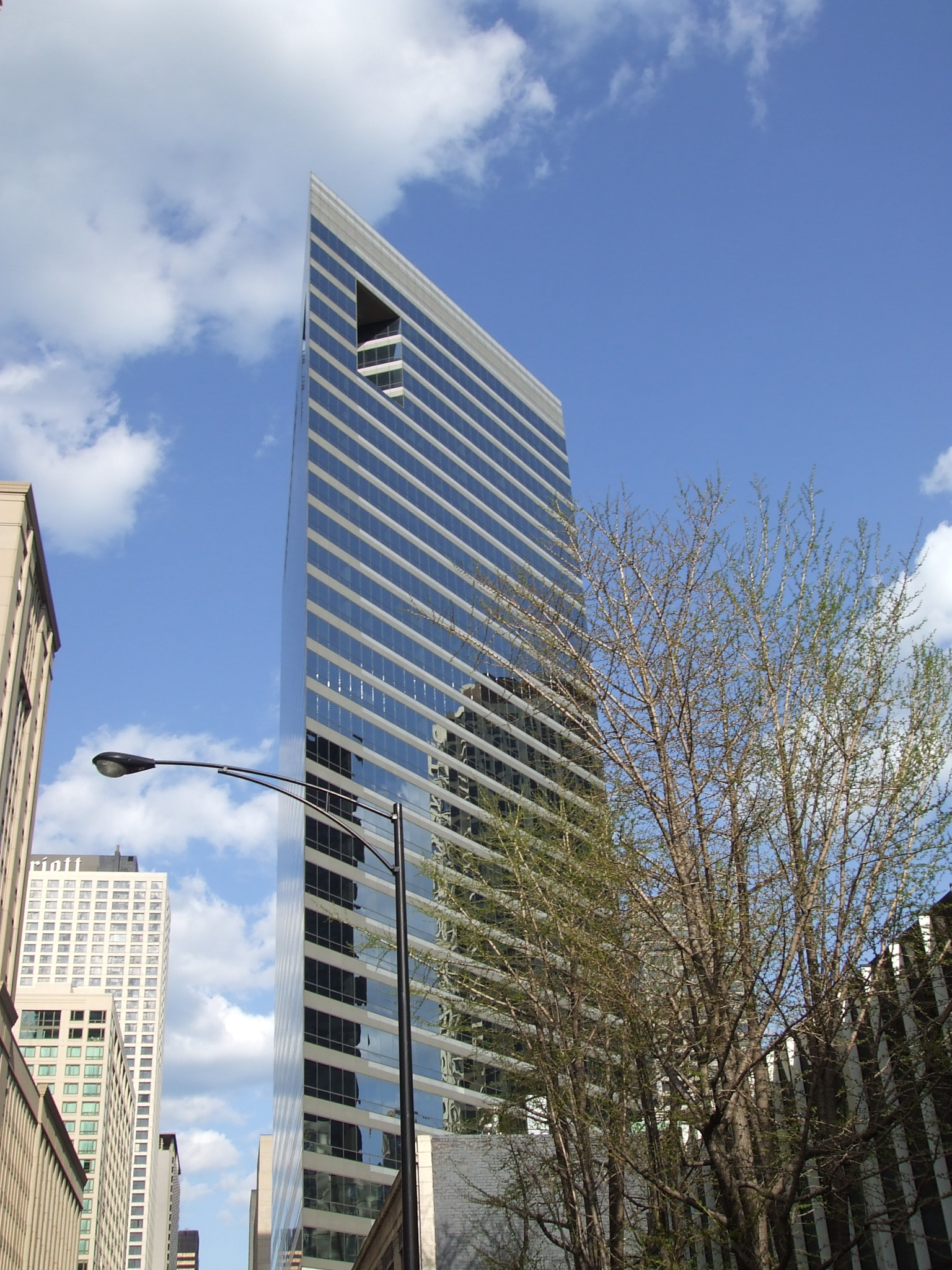
American Medical Association HQ

During the time he was writing dissertation to get the PhD, he became a faculty member in the apartment of Biochemistry in the Western Reserve University between 1929 and 1936. During that period, his students and he published approximately 15 scientific and chemical articles. After many years of studying, in Bing's later career, he joined the American Medical Association and became one of the scientific researchers from 1936. At the same time, he expected to continue his academic research and teaching thus he became a teacher and researcher at the Northwest University between 1936 and 1952. From 1950 to 1952, he worked as an advisor to the Delaney Committee of the United States House of Representatives. He has made many contributions to the Delaney Committee over the next two years, such as preparing background papers for members of the Committee and attending hearings and preparing abstracts for the technical part of the meeting. In 1949, he gave up the job of the advisor and he started a consulting company of his own in Chicago. With his years of experience in nutrition and biochemistry, he has taken care of the company for more than 20 years. In 1967, Bing wrote a biographical sketch for Lydia Jane Roberts (June 30, 1879 – May 28, 1965) who contributing in the aspects of nutriology and biochemistry and published in The Journal of Nutrition. Since then, he has become an independent food and drug advisor for private businesses and government agencies. In 1973, Bing wrote a biographical sketch for Friedrich Bidder (1810–1894) and Carl Schmidt (1822–1894) who contributing in nutriology and biochemistry and published in The Journal of Nutrition. In 1985, Bing became an archivist and worked for the American Institute of Nutrition. Then he and his wife moved to Upper Sandusky to stayed with their child. After he retired in 1988 and they lived in a nursing home until 1988. In October 1988, he died of a brain hemorrhage

== Contribution to nutriology ==
In 1932, W. Lloyd Adams Russel O. Bowman and Bing published an article, which called 'The Protein Requirements of the Albino Mouse'. They considered the relationship between the protein casein levels and the weight gained of mice. These healthy mice were fed special diets containing 0.95, 1.96, 4.0, 7.8, 15.6, 23.2 and 49.7 percent protein casein levels of their total calories, respectively. The researchers measured the changes in food intake and the weight in mice for three to seven weeks. The mice ate 0.95 percent casein lost weight, those ate 1.96 percent stayed the same and the mice ate 4 percent lost weight rapidly. The result was that a diet containing 15.6 percent casein certainly met the mice's protein needs. At the same time, metabolic differences became apparent when weight gaining per gram of protein ingested. From 1935, Bing and his team had launched many nutrition education campaigns. Under Bing's guidance, a large number of articles had been published in The Journal of the American Medical Association. Those articles described the latest information about vitamins and the articles attracted and helped many scholars and professionals. Then the articles were written into an influential book. In addition, Bing constant research in nutrition has aroused his interest in vitamins G. He did an experiment in which he changed the diet of some healthy mice and made their food lack of vitamin G. At the same time, he kept the other mice on a normal diet for a long period. Experiments showed that the neutral fat content was greatly reduced of these vitamin deficient mice and their bones developed at a slower rate than other normal mice. The final result of this experiment showed that Vitamin G is essential. In 1940, Alfred H. Free and Bing published an article in The Journal of Nutrition. The report recorded iron and ionogenic iron levels in wheat tested using a dipyridyl method. The result of this test showed that on average, 81% of the total iron contented in wheat is ionogenic iron. Bing's test reported that the range of ionogenic iron as a percentage of total iron was 73 to 88 percent. In this scale, the percentage of ionogenic iron in the total iron was the same. In 1954, Bing and his team published an article called 'Some New Questions Relating to Chemicals in Foods' in 'American Journal of Public Health and the Nation's Health'. This article summed up many nutriology and chemical opinions of different experts and professors from those years. In 1956, Harold R. Sandstead, F. C. Blanck, Bernard L. Oser, Bernard E. Procter, Glenn G. Slocum and Franklin C. Bing wrote and published an article in Chemical committee on food and nutrition. They suggested that the use of food additives should be more strictly regulated and should cared more about human health. In 1976, Bing wrote and published an article called 'Nutrition research and education in the Age of Franklin. A Bicentennial study' in the Journal of the American Dietetic Association. He documented two hundred years of advances in nutrition and science. In addition, this journal article showed the contributions of many experimental scientists and nutritionists, such as Lavoisier, Count Rumford, and Benjamin Franklin. Their works and experiences laid the foundation for 200 years of progress in scientific knowledge.

== Contribution to medicine ==
During the period when Bing studied in Yale University, he made a large number of notes and considered about a historical medicine – ‘metabolism’ from himself and the field of nutriology from himself and his teacher – Professor Lafayette B. Mendel in past years. His new views of ‘metabolism’ attracted and helped many scholars and professionals. The Professor Lafayette B. Mendel was the head of Physiology and Physiologic Chemistry in Yale University. In addition, Bing worked for American Institute of Baking in Chicago from 1943 to 1950. During that period, some researchers and he conducted a survey of placebos and vitamin in a steel mill. They expected to consider if the effects of placebos and vitamin on factory output and workers' morale would be different thus his team and he picked up one group of workers to do this research. Bing gave the group of workers a vitamin supplement for the first time, a placebo for the second, and no supplements for the last time. They took a long period to come to a result due to a large workload and variables of this experiment. As a result, they considered that placebos and vitamins did not make much difference in boosting workers' morale and the output of the factory. In 1971, Bing published an article on the website - JAMA Network named 'Vitamin C and the Common Cold'. This article argued that Professor Linus Pauling's suggestion that ascorbic acid could be an effective treatment for the common cold. Bing considered that ascorbic acid was not a completely harmless chemical to treat the common cold. In addition, Bing believed that when Professor Linus Pauling used ascorbic acid, it did not prove the safety of all drugs and it meant that the use of ascorbic acid remained controversial. Actually, Bing proposed a possibility to treat the common cold - vitamins.

== Contribution to biological chemistry ==
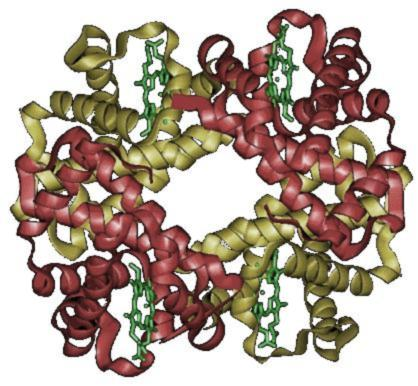
Hemoglobin

During Bing's time as a faculty in the department of Biochemistry in the Western Reserve University, Heinle and Bing developed a new approach to measure the number of red blood cells and the concentration of hemoglobin in 1933 and this measurement was more accurate than previous method and it may has certain application value in small animal research. In 1934, Bing did an experiment with a group of anaemic mice and a group of normal mice to measure their levels of copper and iron. The result of this experiment presented that the significant intraperitoneal advantage over oral iron may be due to the retention of copper. The rapid reconstruction of hemoglobin reflected the improvement of copper utilization rate. In addition, he did a chemistry experiment on anaemic mice and bread. He fed a group of mice bread which containing iron and copper elements for a long period. At the same time, he kept the other mice on a normal diet. The result of this chemistry experiment showed that hemoglobin could be grown and regenerated by both iron and copper elements in bread. In 1940, the JAMA Network published an article on lead and food safety. This report was an experimental study supported by the American Medical Association. Bing and other researchers conducted a number of experimental studies that provided that most of the large amounts of food they tested before, contained trace amounts of lead. Studies showed that these trace amounts of lead could be dangerous to humans over time. According to existing studies and researches, The Council on Foods had repeatedly highlighted the dangers of lead to humans and increased efforts to improve food safety from lead contamination.
