= Lafayette B. Mendel House =

Historic house in Connecticut, United States

- U.S. National Register of Historic Places
- U.S. National Historic Landmark
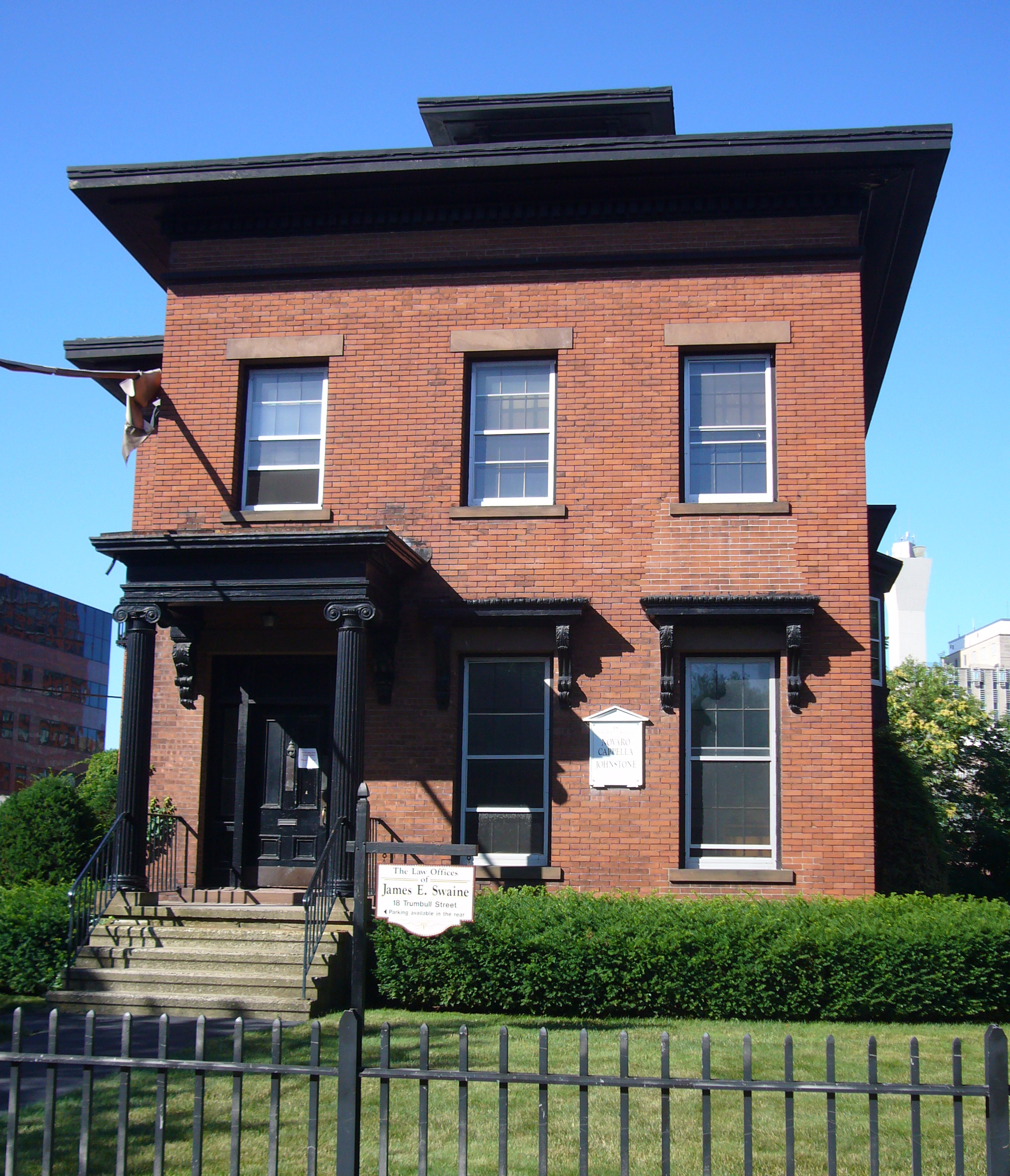

- Location within Connecticut Location within the United States
- Location: 18 Trumbull Street, New Haven, Connecticut
- Coordinates: 41°18′41″N 72°55′7″W
- Area: less than one acre
- Built: 1858
- Architect: Henry Austin
- Architectural style: Renaissance, Italianate
- NRHP reference No.: 76002138

Significant dates
- Added to NRHP: January 7, 1976
- Designated NHL: January 7, 1976

The Lafayette B. Mendel House is an historic Italianate house at 18 Trumbull Street in New Haven, Connecticut. This building, designed by New Haven architect Henry Austin, was the home of Yale University physiology professor, Lafayette Benedict Mendel (1872–1935) from 1900 to 1924. It was declared a National Historic Landmark in 1976 for its association with Mendel, who discovered vitamins A and B, and greatly expanded knowledge of nutrition and food-related biochemistry. The building now houses a law firm.

== Description ==
The Mendel House is a two-story brick building, three bays wide, with a hip roof that has a square cupola at its center, and wide eaves. The main entrance is sheltered by a portico supported by Doric columns. The building is not particularly sophisticated in its architecture, and has been attributed to New Haven architect Henry Austin. It stands in a neighborhood that was developed predominantly in the 1880s, but its construction date is now generally given as 1858 and the house is depicted in a map of the City of New Haven from 1879. The interior of the house has retained much of its original woodwork and styling, despite the addition of partitioning for use as professional offices. The house was purchased by Lafayette Mendel in 1900, and was his home until 1924.

Mendel was born in New York City in 1873 to German immigrants, and entered Yale University in 1887 as the youngest member of his class. After receiving a Ph.D. focused on classical liberal arts, he became an assistant at Yale's Sheffield Scientific School, in the biochemistry lab of Russell Henry Chittenden. During a long and distinguished career there, he made significant advances in the understanding of nutrition and digestion, identifying the chemical compositions of some foods, and isolating and identifying substances in milk critical for the maintenance of life that we now call vitamins. In collaboration with Thomas B. Osborne, Mendel substantially advanced knowledge of amino acids, and quantified the nutritive differences between different types of proteins.

== See also ==
- List of National Historic Landmarks in Connecticut
- National Register of Historic Places listings in New Haven, Connecticut
