= CDN =

CDN may refer to:

== Technology ==
- Content delivery network, on the Internet
- Change detection and notification, for Web pages

== Transportation ==
- Former ICAO airline code for Canadian Airlines
- Coulsdon Town railway station, England, station code
- Croydon railway station, Melbourne, Australia, station code

== Media ==
- CDN Publishing Co., owner of the former Chicago Daily News
- Current Developments in Nutrition, a journal

== Organizations ==
- Cártel del Noreste, a Mexican drug cartel

== Other uses ==
- CDN$, an abbreviation for the Canadian dollar
- Centro Dramático Nacional, the national theatre of Spain
- CDN 37, a Dominican Republic television station
