= Advances in Nutrition =

- Discipline: Nutrition science
- Language: English
- Edited by: Steven A. Abrams, MD

Publication details
- History: 2010-present
- Publisher: American Society for Nutrition
- Frequency: Bimonthly
- Impact factor: 9.2 (2024)

Standard abbreviations
- ISO 4: Adv. Nutr.

Indexing
- ISSN: 2161-8313 (print); 2156-5376 (web)
- LCCN: 2011208392
- OCLC no.: 830970925

Links
- Journal homepage; Online archive

Advances in Nutrition (subtitled: An International Review Journal) is a monthly peer-reviewed medical journal publishing review articles in the field of nutrition science. It was established in 2010 and is published by the American Society for Nutrition.

The editor-in-chief is Steven A. Abrams, MD (Dell Medical School at the University of Texas at Austin). According to the Journal Citation Reports, the journal has a 2025 impact factor of 9.2.

== Aims and Scope ==
Advances in Nutrition (Adv Nutr) is an international review journal that publishes literature reviews focused on key findings and recent research in all areas relevant to nutritional scientists and biomedical researchers. This includes nutrition-related research efforts involving biochemical, molecular, and genetic studies using experimental animal models, domestic animals, and human subjects. The journal also emphasizes clinical nutrition, nutrition education, epidemiology, and public health. Review articles highlight progress made in recent years rather than covering research developments over a broad historical period.
