= Richard David Semba =

American ophthalmologist

Richard D. Semba is an American ophthalmologist, medical researcher and professor. Semba currently is the W. Richard Green Professor of Ophthalmology at the Johns Hopkins School of Medicine, where he leads the Semba laboratory. He is Affiliated Faculty with the Center for a Livable Future at the Johns Hopkins Bloomberg School of Public Health.

== Early life and education ==
Semba grew up in Minneapolis. He graduated from Yale University (B.S., Biology, 1978), where he also worked as a field assistant in the Division of Ornithology of the Yale Peabody Museum of Natural History. He subsequently pursued graduate studies at Stanford University (M.A., Latin American Studies and M.D., 1983), and Johns Hopkins University (M.P.H., 1991). He completed his residency training in ophthalmology at the Wilmer Eye Institute (1984–1987).

== Career ==
In 1987, he became an instructor at Johns Hopkins School of Medicine, reaching the rank of full professor in 2006.

Semba has conducted field research in Indonesia, Malaysia, Liberia, Malawi, Uganda, Peru, Venezuela, and Mexico. His research interests include nutrition and aging, sustainable diets and food systems, and the history of medicine and nutrition. The Semba laboratory at Johns Hopkins University applies mass spectrometry, proteomics, and metabolomics to gain insight into human aging and aging-related diseases such as child stunting, age-related macular degeneration, and Alzheimer's disease. Dr. Semba has authored or co-authored over 400 scientific peer-reviewed publications. He is author or co-author of several books: Handbook of Nutrition and Ophthalmology (2007), Nutrition and Health in Developing Countries, 2nd. ed. (2008), The Vitamin A Story: Lifting the Shadow of Death (2012), and A Perfect Vision: Catalogue of the William Holland Wilmer Rare Book Collection (Johns Hopkins, 2013).

He has been active in numerous professional and scientific organizations. In 1984 he became a member of the American Academy of Ophthalmology. In 1992 Semba joined the World Health Organization for epidemiology and by 1994 he joined both the American Institute of Nutrition and the American Society for Clinical Nutrition. In the same period he worked as a molecular microbiologist at the same place. In 1996 he joined the Society for International Nutrition Research to which he still belongs. From 1999 to 2002 he served on board of directors at the Dwight Hall Center for Social Justice, a division of Yale University.

In 2002 he joined Gerontological Society of America and the same year became a part of Women's Eye Health which was a division of the Schepens Eye Research Institute and Harvard Medical School. From 2004 to 2006 he worked as a regional advisor at the Helen Keller International and by 2006 became a consultant for the United Nations World Food Programme. Ten years later he joined the American Society for Mass Spectrometry. He also is a member of the Human Proteome Organization, and leads its Human Eye Proteome Project.

He has been a featured speaker at national and international conferences, including events sponsored by the National Institutes of Health, the Centers for Disease Control and Prevention, the American Heart Association, the Gerontological Society of America, the Gordon Research Conferences, the European Nutrition Congress, the British Society for Immunology, the International Congress of Pediatrics, the National Library of Medicine, International Society for Infectious Diseases, International Congress of Nutrition, American Society for Microbiology, and many universities including Harvard University, Ulster University, University of Washington, Tufts University School of Medicine, Johns Hopkins University, Emory University School of Medicine, Case Western Reserve University School of Medicine, University of Alabama, and others.
