= Thomas Burr Osborne (chemist) =

American biochemist (1859–1929)

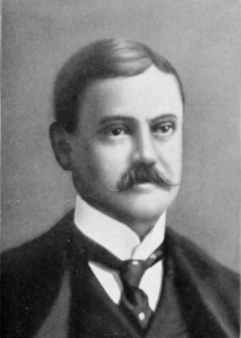
- Born: August 5, 1859; New Haven, Connecticut, U.S.
- Died: January 29, 1929 (aged 69); New Haven, Connecticut, U.S.
- Education: Yale College
- Occupation: Biochemist
- Spouse: Elizabeth Annah Johnson (m. 1886)

Thomas Burr Osborne (August 5, 1859 – January 29, 1929) was an American biochemist who, with Lafayette Mendel, independently discovered Vitamin A, though Elmer McCollum and Marguerite Davis were ultimately given credit, as they had submitted their paper first by three weeks. He is known for his work isolating and characterizing seed proteins, and for determining protein nutritional requirements. His career was spent at the Connecticut Agricultural Experiment Station.

== Biography ==
Thomas Burr Osborne was born in New Haven, Connecticut on August 5, 1859. He was the son of lawyer Arthur Dimon Osborne and the grandson of US Representative Thomas Burr Osborne. He earned an undergraduate degree from Yale College in 1881, and a PhD in chemistry there in 1885.

He married Elizabeth Annah Johnson on June 23, 1886, and they had one son.

Osborne died at his home in New Haven on January 29, 1929.

== Career ==
His life exhibited "a single purpose, the understanding of the relationships of proteins to each other and the animal world. He began his researches upon vegetable proteins in 1888,..." He published his findings in The Vegetable Proteins in 1909.

Osborne realized the polypeptide structure of proteins: "The nature of proteins in seeds was greatly elucidated in the opening years of the 20th century by T.B. Osborne, who developed methods for their isolation and purification, by means of which he discovered the chemical differences in proteins of various plants. His work revealed an imposing number of vegetable proteins. Osborne considered that the amino acids are for the most part united in the protein molecule in polypeptide union; that is, by the union of the NH_{2} of one amino acid with the carboxyl group of another."

The American chemist Thomas B. Osborne was (viewed retropectively) head and shoulders above most of his contemporaries: compulsive attention to meticulous purification, reproducibility, error analysis, etc. shine through all his work. Although most of his work was carried out on seed proteins ... his results had far-reaching significance.

Osborne wrote over 100 papers with longtime collaborator Lafayette Mendel. Both were appointees of the Connecticut Agricultural Experiment Station. In their early work, they studied the deadly poison ricin which is classified as a type 2 ribosome inactivating protein (RIP) from castor beans.

In 1909, Osborne and Mendel's work found what amino acids are necessary for the survival of the laboratory rat. At the Connecticut experimental station they developed a lab with about 200 rats whose dietary intake was carefully controlled. Their studies on rats revealed the necessary elements in a healthy diet. The program was described by J.R. Lindsey and H.J. Baker:

The striking differences in amino acid composition of plant proteins, which had been documented by Osborne, suggested that possible differences might exist in their biological value. The nutritive values of various purified proteins from cereal grains and other plant sources were compared for growth and maintenance in rats. This led to supplementation of "incomplete proteins" with those amino acids limiting each foodstuff's "biological quality" (e.g. Tryptophan and lysine). Casein was found to be a "complete protein", thus paving the way for the use of this protein in modern rat diets. Within a few years it was possible to list the "essential" and "nonessential" amino acids.

The science of nutrition thus evolved beyond the caloric energy of food, turning to the structural issue of essential amino acids.

Osborne was elected to the United States National Academy of Sciences in 1910, the American Academy of Arts and Sciences in 1914, and the American Philosophical Society in 1921.

=== Vitamin A discovery ===
Osborne and Mendel discovered Vitamin A in 1913 in butter fat – independently discovered by Elmer McCollum and Marguerite Davis, who submitted their publication first, with both papers appearing in the same issue of the Journal of Biological Chemistry. Osborne and Mendel showed, for example, that a lack of Vitamin A in the diet led to xerophthalmia.

They also established the importance of lysine and tryptophan in a healthy diet.

"Water-soluble vitamin B" found in "protein-free milk" was also shown to be an essential nutrient.

== Works ==
- 1894: "The Proteids of the Kidney Bean", Journal of the American Chemical Society 16(10): 703–712, doi:10.1021/ja02108a012
- 1902: "Sulfur in protein bodies", Journal of the American Chemical Society 25: 323 to 53
- 1907: The Proteins of the Wheat Kernel, Carnegie Institution of Washington via archive.org
- 1909: The Vegetable Proteins from archive.org
- 1916: (with L. B. Mendel) "The Growth of Rats upon Diets of Isolated Food Substances", Biochemical Journal 10:534–8 .
- 1917: (with L. B. Mendel) "The Relative Value of Certain Proteins and Protein Content Supplements to Corn Gluten", Journal of Biological Chemistry 29:69–92.
- 1924: The Vegetable Proteins, second edition via Internet Archive
