= Journal of Nutrition =

The Journal of Nutrition
- Discipline: Nutrition
- Language: English
- Edited by: Teresa A. Davis, Ph.D.

Publication details
- History: 1928–present
- Publisher: American Society for Nutrition (United States)
- Frequency: Monthly
- Open access: Delayed, after 12 months
- Impact factor: 4.281 (2019)

Standard abbreviations
- ISO 4: J. Nutr.

Indexing
- CODEN: JONUAI
- ISSN: 0022-3166 (print); 1541-6100 (web)
- LCCN: 33014482
- OCLC no.: 637445723

Links
- Journal homepage; Online access; Online archive

The Journal of Nutrition (or shortened as JN or J Nutr) is a peer-reviewed scientific journal published by the American Society for Nutrition. Established in 1928, the journal publishes experimental research on human, animal, cellular and molecular nutrition; biographies and assessments on nutritional researchers; and commentaries on controversial issues in the field. In 2020, its editor-in-chief was Dr. Teresa A. Davis. According to the Journal Citation Reports, The Journal of Nutrition had an impact factor of 4.281 in 2019—a decline from its 2018 rating of 4.416.
