= Current Developments in Nutrition =

- Discipline: Nutrition
- Language: English
- Edited by: Jack Odle, Ph.D.

Publication details
- History: 2019–present
- Publisher: Oxford University Press (United States)
- Frequency: Monthly
- Impact factor: 3.2 (2020)

Standard abbreviations
- ISO 4: Curr. Dev. Nutr.

Indexing
- ISSN: 2475-2991

Links
- Journal homepage; Online access; Online archive

Current Developments in Nutrition is a monthly peer-reviewed biomedical journal in the field of nutrition.

The journal was established in 2017 as the first Gold Open Access journal of the American Society for Nutrition American Society for Nutrition. In 2018, Oxford University Press took over as publisher of the journal, although it is still owned by the American Society for Nutrition.

The journal adds many areas of coverage to the portfolio previously offered by American Society for Nutrition journals. It ranges from mechanistic studies at molecular, biochemical, and cellular levels to whole-body metabolism, clinical health, fitness, and population health. Current Developments in Nutrition publishes supplements separate from the main issue, and collections which are articles published across issues. The journal has six areas of emphasis, including Implementation Science; Research Methodology and Study Design Food and Nutrition Policy; Food & Nutrition of Indigenous Peoples; Brief Communications; and Food/Feed Composition, Nutritional Value & Toxicology.

Current Developments in Nutrition is indexed in PubMed Central, Google Scholar, Web of Science, and other indexing agencies. The journal has published the abstracts of the ASN's annual meeting since 2018. Nutrition 2018 abstracts Nutrition 2019 abstracts

The journal publicly lists the conflicts of interest of its editorial board on its website.
