= Lafayette Mendel =

American biochemist

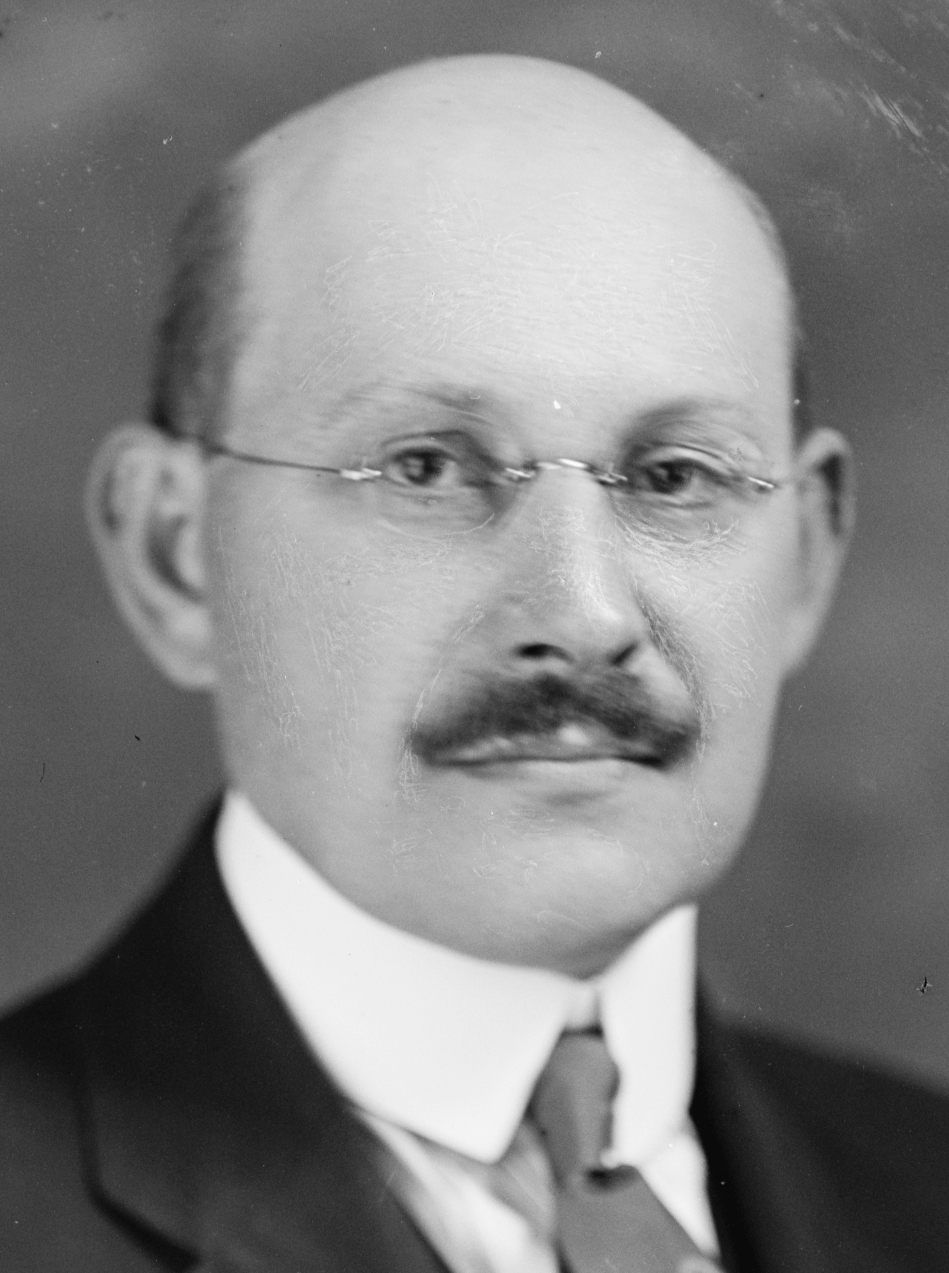
- Born: February 5, 1872; Delhi, New York, United States
- Died: December 9, 1935 (aged 63); New Haven, Connecticut, U.S.
- Education: Yale University
- Awards: Member of National Academy of Sciences; American Institute of Chemists Gold Medal (1927); Conné Medal from Chemist's Club of New York
- Scientific career
- Fields: Biochemist
- Workplaces: Yale University
- Doctoral advisor: Russell Henry Chittenden
- Doctoral students: Icie Macy Hoobler; Florence B. Seibert; Helen B. Thompson

Lafayette Benedict Mendel (February 5, 1872 – December 9, 1935) was an American biochemist known for his work in nutrition, with longtime collaborator Thomas B. Osborne, including the study of Vitamin A, Vitamin B, lysine and tryptophan.

== Early life ==
Mendel was born in Delhi, New York, son of Benedict Mendel, a merchant born in Aufhausen, Germany in 1833, and Pauline Ullman, born in Eschenau, Germany. His father immigrated to the United States from Germany in 1851, and his mother did in 1870.

== Education ==
At the age of 15, he won a New York State scholarship. Mendel studied classics, economics and the humanities, as well as biology and chemistry at Yale University and graduated with honors in 1891.

== Career ==
He then began graduate work at the Sheffield Scientific School on a fellowship and studied physiological chemistry under Russell Henry Chittenden. He finished his Ph.D. 1893 after only two years; his thesis topic was the study of the seed storage protein edestin extracted from hemp seed. Upon graduation, he began as an assistant at the Sheffield School in physiological chemistry. He also studied in Germany and was made an assistant professor on his return in 1896. He became a full professor in 1903 with appointments in the Yale School of Medicine and the Yale Graduate School as well as Sheffield.

With Chittenden, Mendel became one of the founders of the science of nutrition. Together with longtime collaborator Thomas B. Osborne, he established essential amino acids. In 1903, at age 31, he was appointed full professor of physiological chemistry. In 1913, along with the American biochemists Elmer McCollum and Marguerite Davis, he discovered a fat-soluble factor in cod liver oil and butter, now known as vitamin A. In 1915, he discovered an important water-soluble growth factor in milk, now known as vitamin B complex. In promoting Mendel, Yale made him one of the first high-ranking Jewish professors in the United States. Capping his illustrious career Mendel was appointed Sterling Professor of Physiological Chemistry in 1921. Of the twenty professors to be designated Sterling professors in the decade following their inception in 1920, only two were selected before Mendel. Of the twenty, Mendel was the only Jew.

Mendel wrote over 100 papers with Osborne of the Connecticut Agricultural Experiment Station, where Mendel was also an appointee. In their early work, they studied the deadly poison ricin which is classified as a type 2 ribosome inactivating protein (RIP) from castor beans. He was a member of the Connecticut Academy of Arts and Sciences.

== Vitamin A discovery ==
Mendel and Osborne's most important work involved the use of carefully controlled studies on rats to study the necessary elements in a healthy diet. They discovered Vitamin A in 1913 in butter fat – independently discovered by Elmer McCollum and Marguerite Davis, who submitted their publication first, with both papers appearing in the same issue of the Journal of Biological Chemistry – as well as water-soluble vitamin B in milk. They showed, for example, that a lack of Vitamin A in the diet led to xerophthalmia. They also established the importance of lysine and tryptophan in a healthy diet.

Mendel wrote many articles and published Changes in the Food Supply and Their Relation to Nutrition (1916) and Nutrition, the Chemistry of Life (1923).

Mendel married Alice R. Friend on July 29, 1917; they had no children. He died in 1935 of a heart condition after a long illness. His house in New Haven is a National Historic Landmark.

== Honors and awards ==
Mendel received many honors during his career. He was made Sterling Professor at Yale in 1921. He was the first president of the American Institute of Nutrition. He was made a member of the National Academy of Sciences in 1913 and of the American Philosophical Society in 1916. He won the American Institute of Chemists Gold Medal in 1927 "for his outstanding contributions to chemistry." He was elected to the American Academy of Arts and Sciences in 1930. He won the Conné Medal of the Chemist's Club of New York in 1935 "for his outstanding chemical contributions to medicine."
