= Marguerite Davis =

American chemist

- Born: September 16, 1887; Racine, Wisconsin, U.S.
- Died: September 19, 1967 (aged 80); Racine, Wisconsin
- Education: University of California, Berkeley
- Known for: Discovering Vitamin A and B
- Scientific career
- Fields: Biochemist
- Workplaces: University of Wisconsin, Squibb Pharmaceutical Company, Rutgers University
- Academic advisors: Elmer Verner McCollum

Marguerite Davis (September 16, 1887 – September 19, 1967) was an American biochemist, co-discoverer of vitamins A and B with Elmer Verner McCollum in 1913. Their research greatly influenced later research on nutrition.

== Early life ==
Davis was born on September 16, 1887, in Racine, Wisconsin, to John Jefferson Davis, a local physician and botanist, who taught at the University of Wisconsin. In his 1964 autobiography, Elmer Verner McCollum says that Davis was physically handicapped by severe burns that she received at age ten while playing at a bonfire when her clothing caught fire.

== Education ==
Davis' background and scientific interests led her to enroll at the University of Wisconsin in 1906. In 1908, she transferred to the University of California at Berkeley and received her bachelor of science degree in home economics in 1910. After graduation, Davis returned to the University of Wisconsin where she completed some graduate work, but did not complete a master's degree. At the University of Wisconsin, Davis began her work as a research assistant with McCollum.

== Discovery of vitamins A and B ==
Davis worked as an assistant for McCollum, caring for a large rat colony and helping expand it. Davis helped McCollum carry out "ten or more times as many experiments as [he] alone could manage". They were attempting to create mixtures that could replace food in animal diets, specifically studying trace chemicals in foods that are essential to life. These substances were called "vitamines", as they hypothesized that they were the organic molecule "amines".

In 1913, Davis and McCollum identified what they called "fat-soluble A", a substance found in fats that is essential to life. They distinguished it from another substance described by Dutch chemist Christiaan Eijkman, which they studied and called "water-soluble B." These were later renamed Vitamins A and B, after long research on rats. The discovery of two vitamins paved the way to further research in nutrition.

Their discovery of fat-soluble Vitamin A and water-soluble Vitamin B was first published in the Journal of Biological Chemistry in 1913 in the paper "The Necessity of Certain Lipins in the Diet during Growth".

== Career ==
Davis founded the nutrition laboratories at the University of Wisconsin–Madison. She briefly moved to New Jersey to work for the Squibb Pharmaceutical Company and later helped Rutgers University form a nutrition lab as part of its Ernest Mario School of Pharmacy. In 1940, she returned to the University of Wisconsin to teach and do research for a number of years.

In 1940, Davis retired, returning to her hometown of Racine to live with her brother, John Archibald “Archie” Davis, in their family home. Davis pursued history and gardening after her retirement, and was active in local civic affairs. She was recognized for her contributions as a civic leader by Racine's Women's Civic Council in 1958. Davis died in Racine three days after her eightieth birthday on September 19, 1967.

In his 1964 autobiography, McCollum attributes his success in nutrition research to two people: Davis and Stephen Babcock. Davis worked in McCollum's lab from 1909 to 1916. McCollum asked annually for a salary for Davis, but was denied up until her last year. She was unpaid for 5 years, and was paid $600 in her sixth, and final year. After Davis left Madison, the rat colony that Davis helped build and care for was cared for by Nina Simmonds from 1916 to 1929.

== Selected publications ==
- Elmer McCollum; Marguerite Davis (July 1913). "The necessity of certain lipins in the diet during growth". Journal of Biological Chemistry. 15 (1): 167–175. doi:10.1016/s0021-9258(18)88553-2. ISSN 0021-9258. Wikidata Q119290336.
- E.V. McCollum; Marguerite Davis (November 1915). "The nature of the dietary deficiencies of rice". Journal of Biological Chemistry. 23 (1): 181–230. doi:10.1016/s0021-9258(18)87611-6. ISSN 0021-9258. Wikidata Q119315979.
- E.V. McCollum; Marguerite Davis (November 1915). "The essential factors in the diet during growth". Journal of Biological Chemistry. 23 (1): 231–246. doi:10.1016/s0021-9258(18)87612-8. ISSN 0021-9258. Wikidata Q119316181.
- MARGUERITE DAVIS; Julia Outhouse (1 March 1921). "EFFECT OF A RATION LOW IN FAT SOLUBLE "A" ON THE TISSUES OF RATS". JAMA Pediatrics. 21 (3): 307. doi:10.1001/archpedi.1921.01910330098007. ISSN 1072-4710. Wikidata Q119317490.
