= American Society for Nutrition =

American scientific society

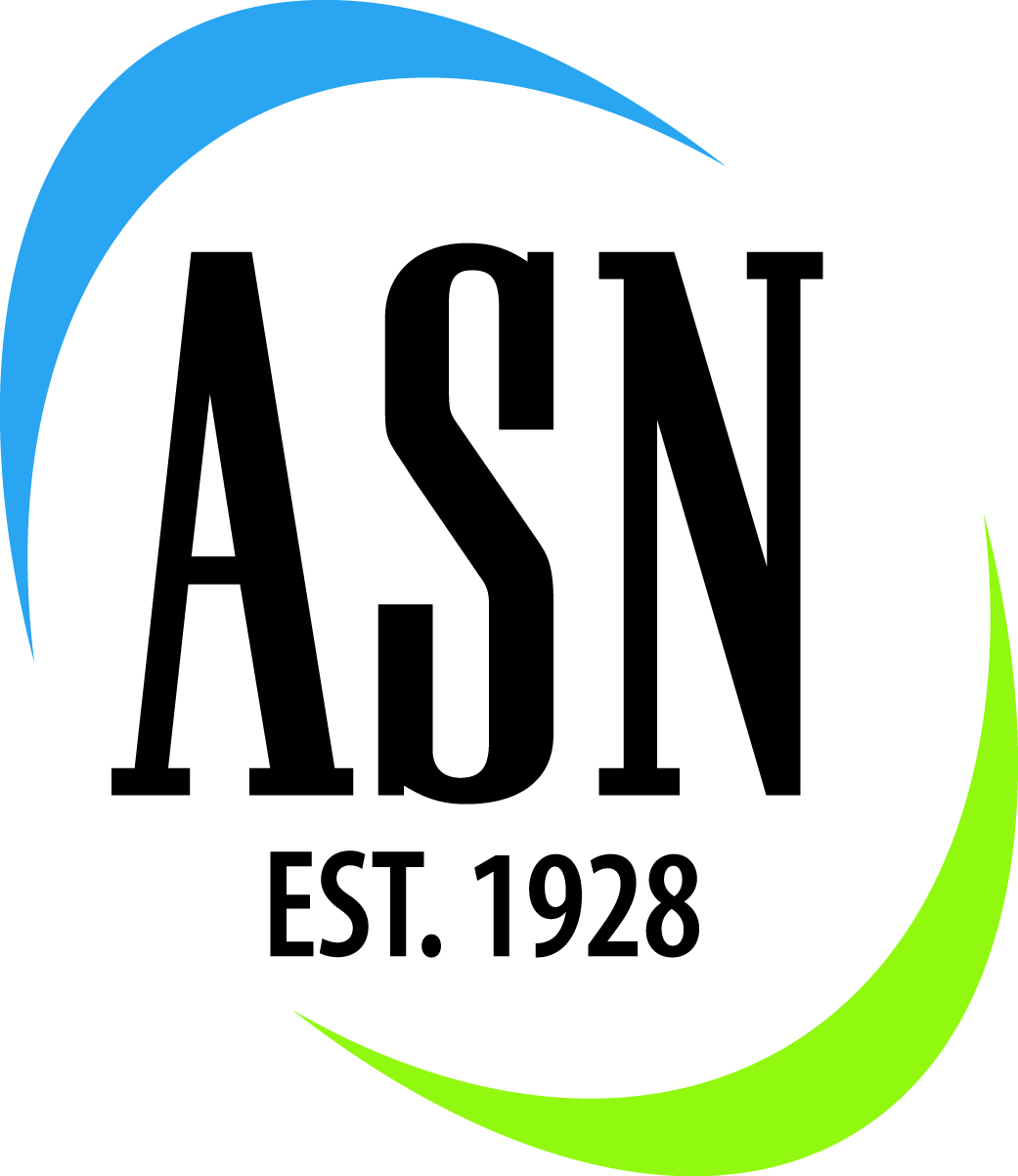
- Abbreviation: ASN
- Merger of: American Society for Nutritional Sciences, American Society for Clinical Nutrition, Society for International Nutrition
- Headquarters: Rockville, MD
- CEO: John E. Courtney, PhD
- Website: www.nutrition.org

The American Society for Nutrition (ASN) is an American society for professional researchers and practitioners in the field of nutrition. ASN publishes four journals in the field of nutrition. It has been criticized for its financial ties to the food and beverage industry.

== History ==
In 1928 a group of United States biochemists and physiologists grouped together to form the first scientific society focused on nutrition, the American Institute for Nutrition. The Society held its first meeting at the Cornell Medical School in 1934. The society was renamed the American Society for Nutritional Sciences in 1996.

In 2005, the American Society for Nutritional Sciences, the American Society for Clinical Nutrition (established 1961), and the Society for International Nutrition (established 1996) merged to form The American Society for Nutrition (ASN).

As of 2024, ASN has a membership of more than 8,000. It is one of the constituent societies comprising the Federation of American Societies for Experimental Biology, a non-profit organization that is the principal umbrella organization of U.S. societies in the field of biological and medical research.

In October 2010, the American College of Nutrition and American Society for Nutrition proposed to merge.^{[2]}

=== "Smart Choices" program ===
The ASN administered the "Smart Choices" food labelling program, which was suspended in 2009 after criticism.

== Publications ==
ASN owns four academic journals, and occasionally uses them to self-publish content independent of the journal's editorial review process. Some of the journals' editorial staff accept funding from food industry organizations. As of 2018, the ASN-run journals are printed by the Oxford University Press.

| Journal title | Year of founding | 2018 impact factor |
|---|---|---|
| The American Journal of Clinical Nutrition | 1952 | 6.568 |
| Advances in Nutrition | 2010 | 7.24 |
| The Journal of Nutrition | 1928 | 4.416 |
| Current Developments in Nutrition | 2017 | Expected 2020 |

In 2017 the ASN launched Current Developments in Nutrition as an open-access journal aiming for rapid publication and a broader range of topics than the ASN's other journals. It publishes sponsored supplements, but these are reviewed by the journal.

== Memberships and sustaining partners ==
=== Membership ===
Eligibility for membership:

- Regular Members - Any individual with a doctoral-level degree and suitable scholarly achievements, as determined by the Board of Directors
- Associate Members - Any individual with a doctoral-level degree, or relevant professional accomplishments, as determined by the Board of Directors
- Student Members - Any individual who is a candidate for an undergraduate, graduate, or medical degree
- Emeritus Members - Any member age 65 years or older may apply to the Board of Directors for Emeritus Membership
- Young Professional / Postdoctoral Members - Any individual within three years of receiving a doctorate, medical degree, or other degree in nutrition or a related field

=== Sponsors ===
ASN uses the term "Sustaining Partners" for corporate sponsors donating over $10,000 per year. According to their website:

Industry companies with the highest level of commitment to the nutrition profession are recognized as Sustaining Partners of the American Society for Nutrition. Engage with ASN as a Sustaining Partner today, and benefit from a number of advantages! Recognition includes print and online exposure, annual meeting benefits, and the ability to sponsor educational opportunities, grants and other items. However, you will derive the greatest benefit by aligning your company with ASN's superlative scientific reputation.

The American Society for Nutrition's sustaining partners, as listed on its website as of March 2018, are: Abbott Nutrition, Almond Board of California, Bayer HealthCare, Biofortis Clinical Research, California Walnut Commission, Cargill, Inc., Corn Refiners Association, Council for Responsible Nutrition, Dairy Research Institute, DSM Nutritional Products (LLC), DuPont Nutrition & Health, the Egg Nutrition Center of the American Egg Board, General Mills Bell Institute of Health and Nutrition, Herbalife/Herbalife Nutrition Institute, International Bottled Water Foundation, Kellogg Company, Kyowa Hakko USA Inc., Mars Inc., McCormick Science Institute, Mondelez International Technical Center, Monsanto Company, National Cattlemen's Beef Association (a contractor to "The Beef Checkoff"), Nestlé Nutrition, Medical Affairs, PepsiCo, Pfizer, Inc., Pharmavite (LLC), Tate & Lyle, The a2 Milk Company, The Coca-Cola Company, The Dannon Company Inc., The Sugar Association, and Unilever.

== Corporate relationship concerns ==
The ASN has conflicting interests in taking funding from food industry marketing groups while providing unbiased information on nutrition; these conflicting interests have caused criticism and concerns of bias. ASN actions have also been criticized for being better-aligned with the nutritional advice of sponsors than the advice of the World Health Organization and other public health, public interest, and government organizations.

Long-time member Marion Nestle has voiced concerns about what she sees as a "too-cozy relationship with food company sponsors" within the organization. In a 2015 report, Michele Simon also voiced concerns regarding corporate involvement with the society.

== See also ==
- National Board of Physician Nutrition Specialists
