= List of historic properties in Williams, Arizona =

- Town
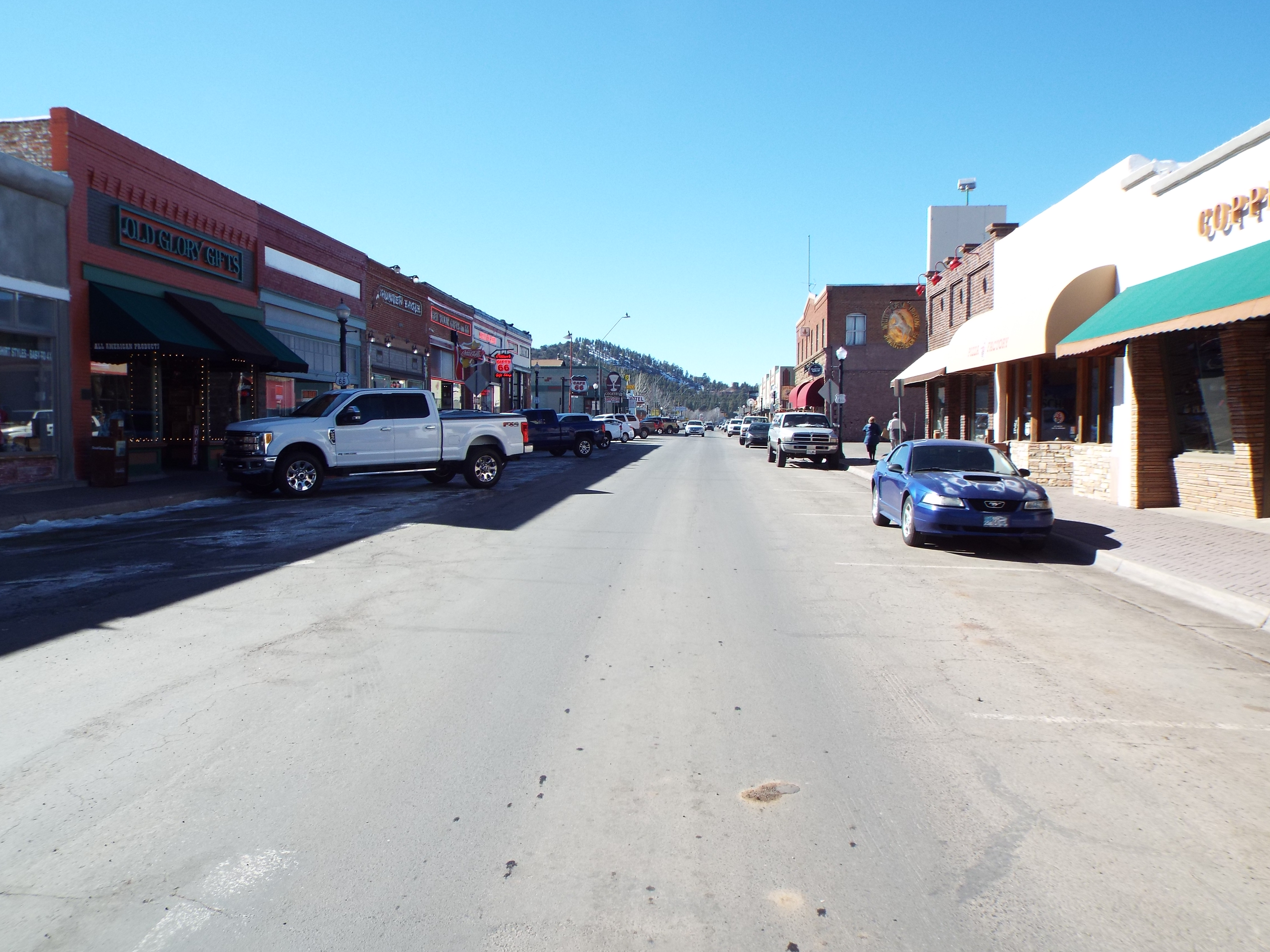
- Historic Urban Route 66

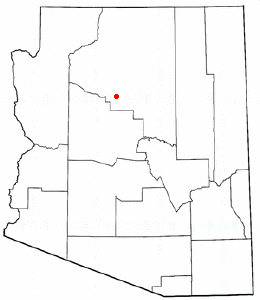
- Location of Williams in Coconino County, Arizona

This is a list, which includes a photographic gallery, of some of the remaining historic buildings, houses, bridges, structures and monuments in Williams, Arizona, some of which are listed in the National Register of Historic Places (NRHP). Also included is the Grand Canyon Locomotive No. 539 which was built in 1917 for the Northern Pacific Railroad and is currently located in the Williams Santa Fe Depot.

== Brief history ==
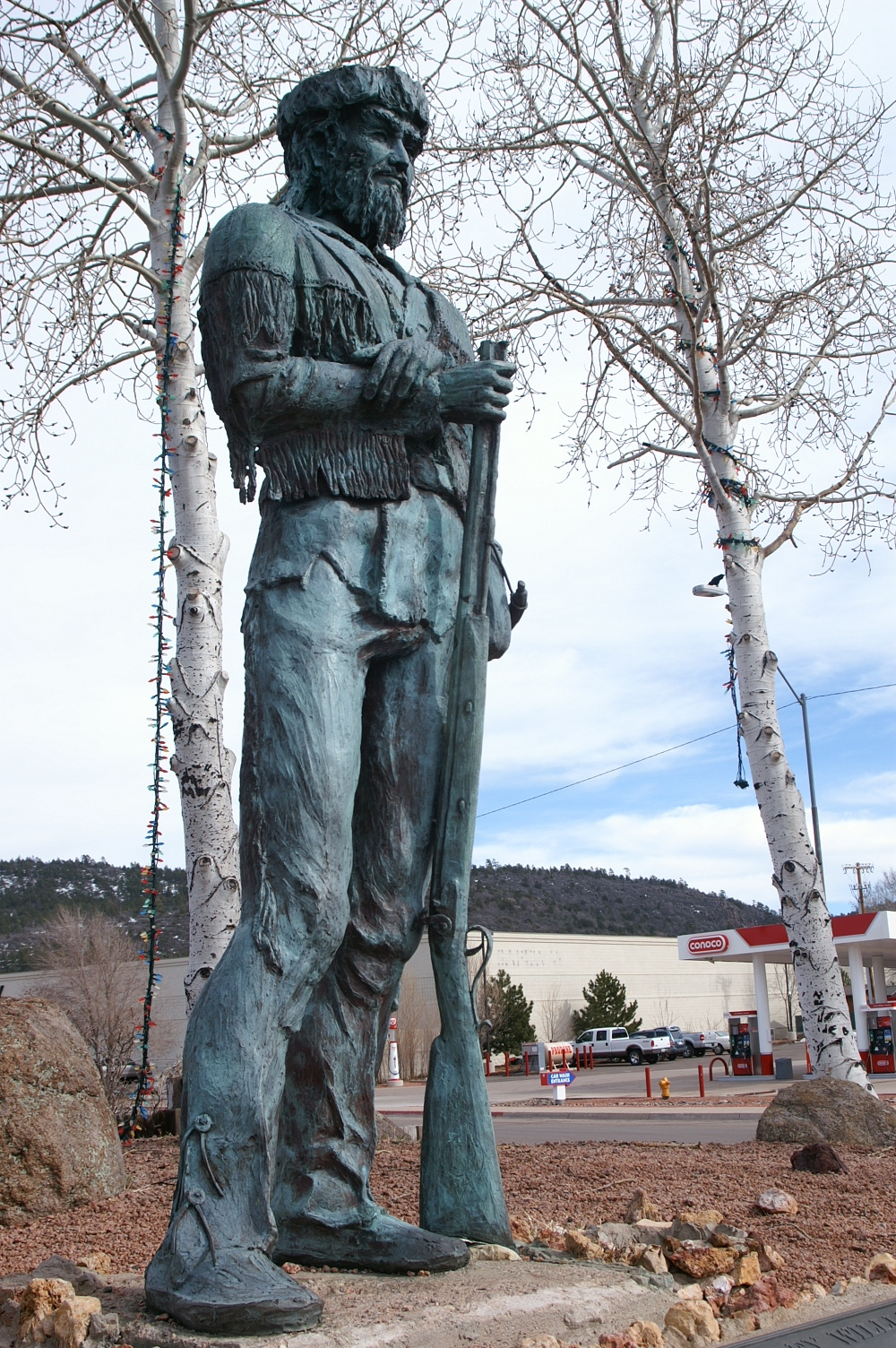
Old Bill Williams statue in Williams

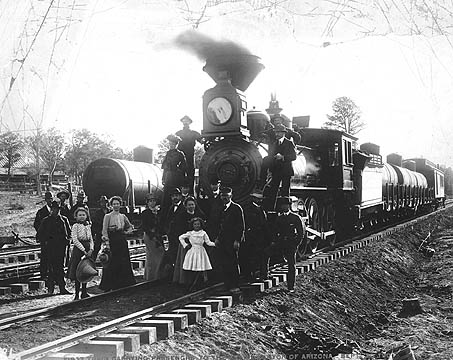
Grand Canyon Railroad inaugural run, September 1901

The area where the town of Williams is located was once inhabited by the Cohonina, early ancestors of the Hopi people and therefore, the area is considered as sacred.

In 1876, the first settlers in the area who were not Native-American, were cattle and sheep ranchers of European descent. In 1881, the town's founding fathers named the settlement "Williams" in honor of William Sherley "Old Bill" Williams a noted mountain man and frontiersman. Although "Old Bill" never lived there, the settlers also named a river the Bill Williams River; and a mountain Bill Williams Mountain after him. An 8-foot-tall bronze sculpture by B. R. Pettit, was erected in 1980 in the Bill Williams Monument Park of Williams. The town's population continued to grow and as such soon had its own post office.

Four fires practically ravaged the town. The first of these fires occurred in 1884, it consumed 36 businesses, 2 hotels and 10 homes. Another occurred in 1901 and one in 1903, destroying six saloons, one restaurant and two homes. The fourth fire in 1908, took out an entire city block and 10 homes. The Tetzlaff Building was one of the few structures that survived three fires because unlike the other buildings, that were made basically out of wood material, the Tetzlaff was made of brick. The Tetzlaff Building was built in 1897, by a German immigrant by the name of August Tetzlaff. The building housed a saloon, a bordello and in the back of the building, thru an alley, there was a Chinese chophouse and Wu's Joint, an opium den.

Williams was incorporated as a town on July 9, 1901. The avenues in the commercial area were named Railroad and Bill Williams, while those in the residential area were named after American Civil War generals (Grant, Sherman, Sheridan, Hancock, Meade).

In 1901, the same year that the town of Williams was incorporated, the Williams and the Atchison, Topeka & Santa Fe Railway extended its passenger line from Williams to the South Rim of the Grand Canyon, thus Williams became known as "Gateway to the Grand Canyon". The slogan first appeared in the Williams News in 1901. The railroad extension greatly increased tourism to the area. In 1908, the Frey Marcos Hotel, one of the historic Harvey House's was inaugurated. It was built alongside the Williams Santa Fe Depot.

There were many saloons on Railroad Ave. The local government at the time restricted the many buildings of vice to an area on Railroad Avenue which became known as “Saloon Row”. The oldest of these buildings are the Tetflaff and Cabinet Saloon. Both of these structures were survivors of the 1908 fire. Prostitution in Williams was outlawed in 1907.

The historic Route 66, which runs through Williams, was completed in 1926. The establishment of Route 66 was one of the major factors which contributed to the growth of the town. People who emigrated to the western part of the United States and tourists from different parts of the country often stopped and visited the city. As a consequence many motels were built, among them the Motor Hotel, located on the southeast corner of 4th Street, and the 9 Arizona Motor Hotel located on 315 W. Route 66.

On October 13, 1984, Interstate 40 was opened around the town which represented the essential end of US 66. However, an agreement was reached with the government which allowed the state to build three exits to Williams, thereby the town was able to avoid the state of abandonment which normally occurs when a town is bypassed by a highway. The following year Route 66 was decommissioned.

The Arizona Memory Project has a collection in the City of Williams Public Library of photographs depicting the early days of Williams. This was made possible by a collaboration between the Williams Public Library and the Kaibab National Forest officials. It features photos of local ranching, logging, railroad activity, people and places of Williams.

The fact that a property is listed in the National Register of Historic Places does not mean that the property is safe from being demolished by its owner. According to Jim McPherson, Arizona Preservation Foundation Board President:

"It is crucial that residents, private interests, and government officials act now to save these elements of our cultural heritage before it is too late."

The city has two historic districts and various individual properties listed in the National Register of Historic Places. The two districts are the Williams Historic Business District and the Williams Residential Historic District. Also included in this list are properties which are in the South Kaibab Plateau of the Kaibab National Forest whose southern boundary lies within the town limits of Williams.

== Williams Historic Business District ==
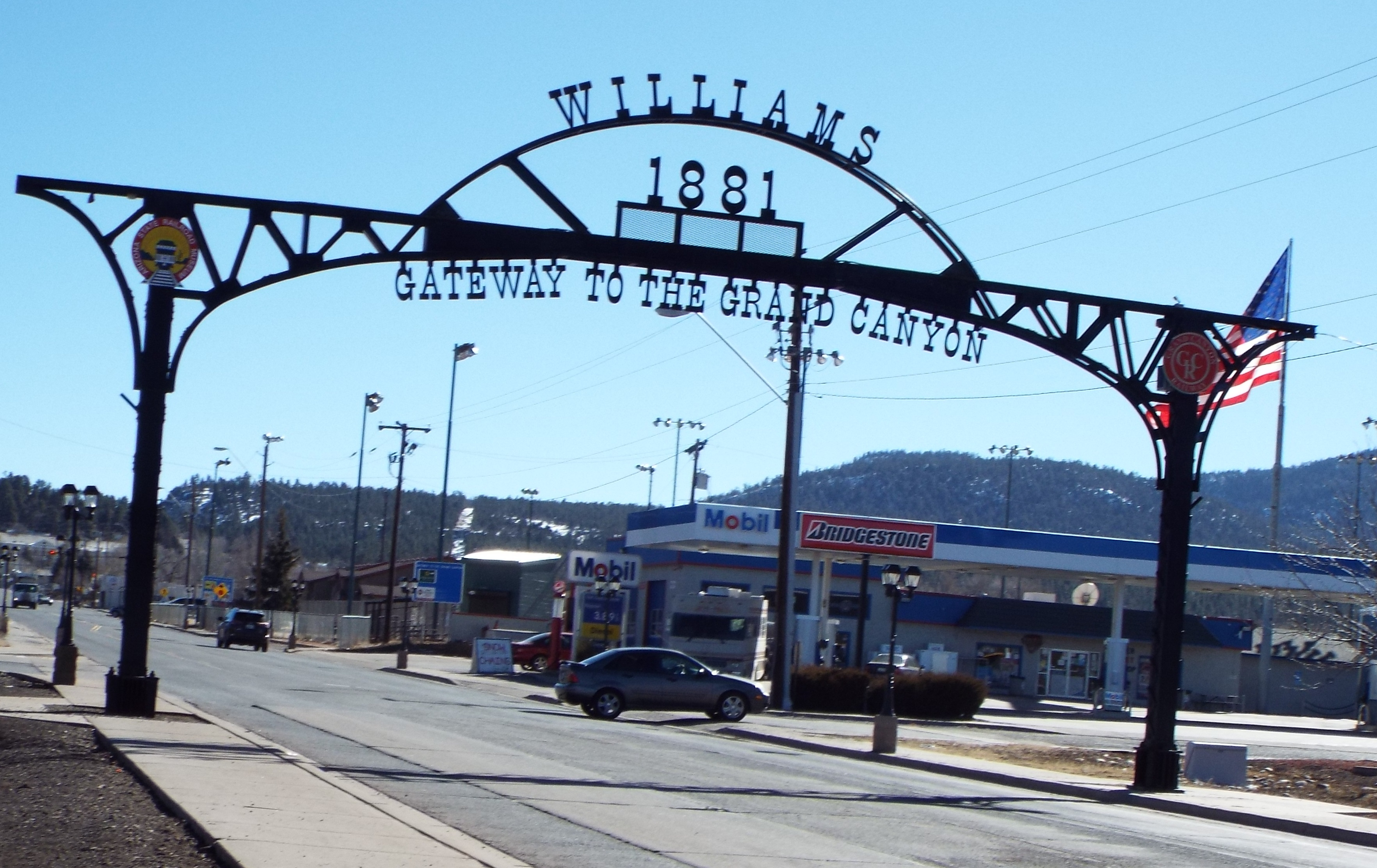
Entrance to Williams Historic Business District

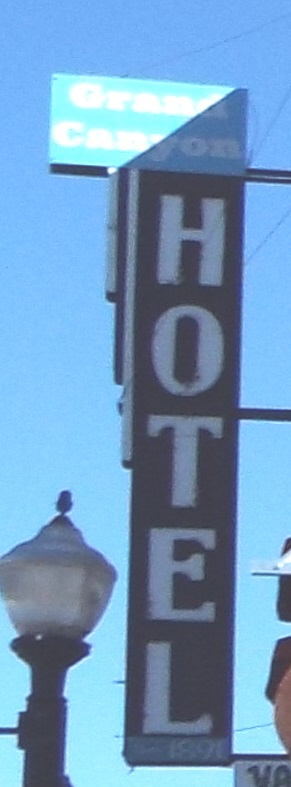
Vintage Grand Canyon Hotel sign

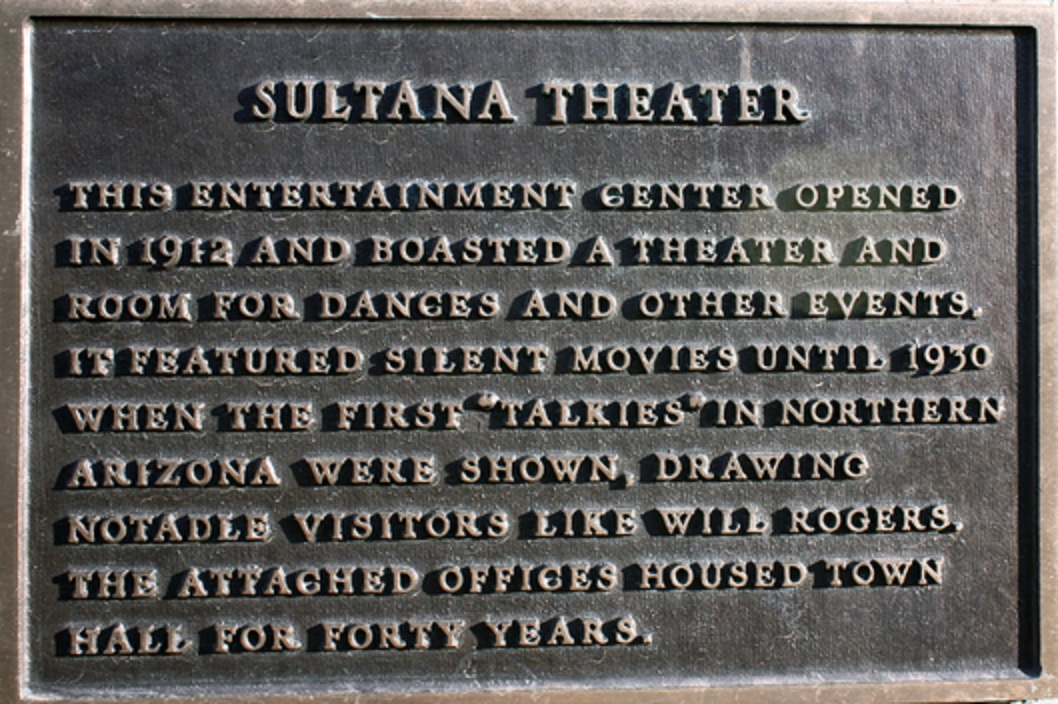
Sultana Theatre historic plaque

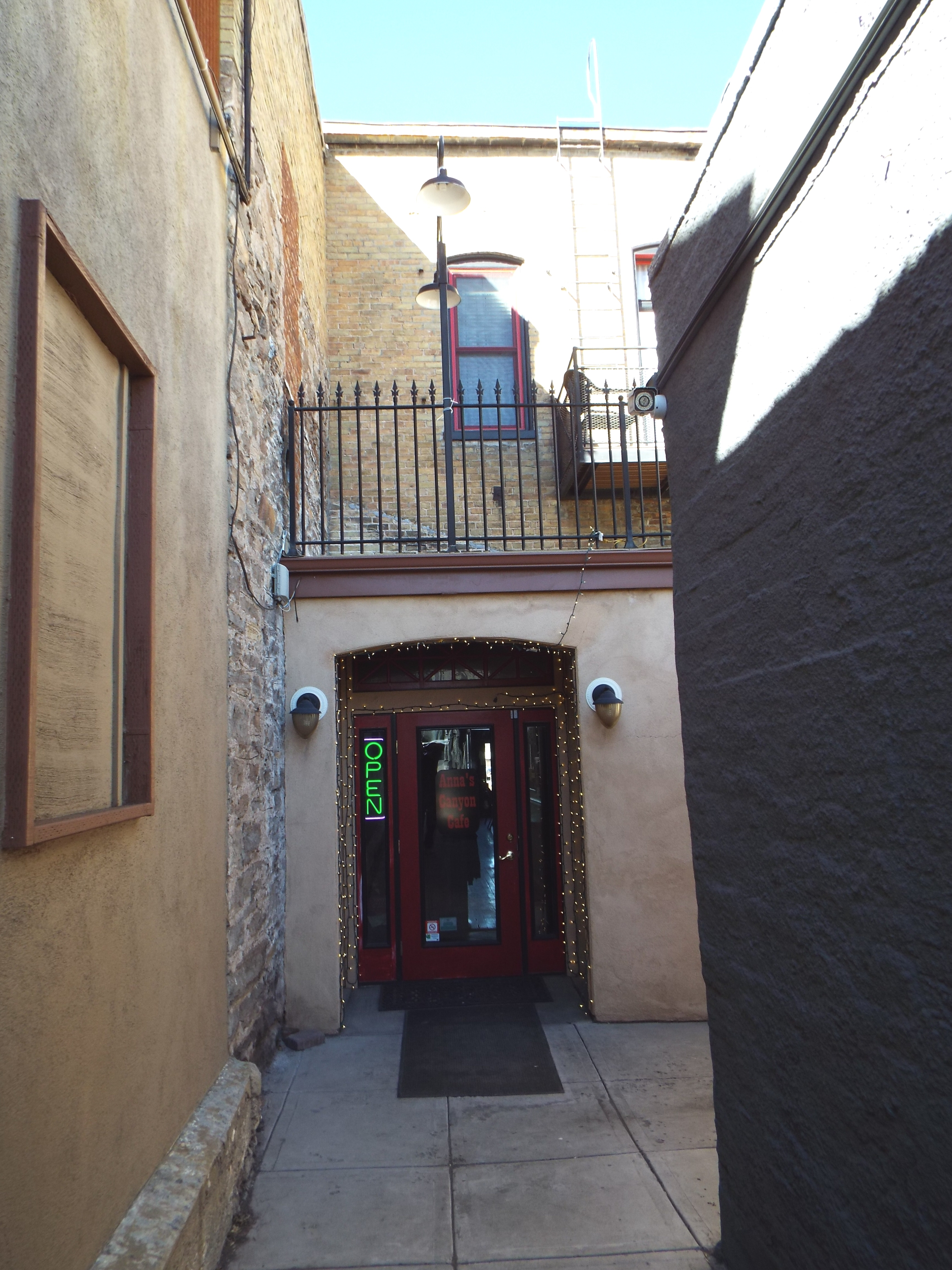
Wu's Joint Opium Den was located in this alley behind the Tetzlaff Hotel. The bordello was located on the second floor

Listed are some of the buildings which are within the boundaries of the Williams Historic Business District. The boundaries of the district is situated Grant and Railroad Aves. and 1st and 4th Street. The area was listed in the National Register of Historic Places on December 20, 1984, reference #84000436. The section between Bill Williams Ave. between 6th St. and Pine St. was individually listed in the National Register of Historic Places on May 19, 1989, as the Urban Route 66. The NRHP reference for this listing is #89000376. Also, some properties such as the DelSue Motor Inn, the Williams Santa Fe Depot and the Grand Canyon Railway between Williams and Grand Canyon Village are listed individually in the National Register of Historic Places.

However, not all of the individual structures qualify as historical within the district. Private owners have the undeniable right to demolish or change the façade of the structure for commercial reasons. According to the National Historic Landmarks Program: Listing of private property as a National Historic Landmark or in the National Register does not prohibit under Federal law or regulations any actions which may otherwise be taken by the property owner with respect to the property. According to a "Historic Resource Survey" which was made of Route 66 in Arizona, some of the structures are not individually eligible for inclusion in the National Register of Historic Places. However, certain individual properties have been recognized as historical contributors to the district with a plaque.

The following properties are pictured:

- The Babbitt-Polson Warehouse Building – built in c. 1890 and is located at NW Corner of the Visitors Center. According to the "Williams News". this warehouse is the last of its kind in Williams. The signs painted on the east end are a timeline to the ownership of the building.
- The Bowden Building – was built in 1947 and is located at 144 W. Route 66.
- The Rock Building – was built in 1936 and is located at 326 W. Route 66.
- The Postal Telegraph/Bennitt Auto Building – was built in 1910 and is located at 239 W. Route 66.
- The White Horse Trading Co. Building – was built in 1910 and is located at 229 W. Route 66.
- The Rittenhouse Haberdashery Building – was built in 1910 and is located at 225 W. Route 66.
- The Grand Canyon Drug Co. Building – was built in 1912 and is located at 221 W. Route 66.
- The Old Pool Parlor Building – was built in 1910 and is located at 217 W. Route 66.
- The Lebeach Confectionery Building – was built in 1914 and is located at 213 W. Route 66.
- The Dime Store Building – was built in 1912 and is located at 209 W. Route 66.
- The Duffy Brothers Grocery Building – was built in 1912 and is located at 201 W. Route 66.
- The Citizens Bank Building – was built in 1918 and is located at 202 W. Route 66. The building is built of buff brick which is a light yellow-brown color.
- The Sultana Theatre Building – was built in 1912 and is located at 301 W. Route 66. The theater offered silent movies. A series of tunnels which were built by Chinese railroad workers, played an instrumental role in the running of liquor and gambling in the Sultana during prohibition. The first "talkie" movie in Northern Arizona was shown there in 1930.
- The Pollock Building – was built in 1901 (first floor) and 1927 (second floor). It is located at W. 109 N. 3rd Street.
- The Grand Canyon Hotel Building – was built by pioneer merchant Cormick E. Boyce in 1891. The hotel, which was first known as the Boyce Hotel, is located at 145 W. Route 66.
- The Old Williams Fire Station – was built in 1902 and is located at 135 W. Route 66.
- The Old Williams Post Office Building – was built in 1907 and is located at 133 W. Route 66.
- The General Store Building – was built in 1907 and is located at 129 W. Route 66.
- The Adams Grocery Store Building – was built in 1907 and is located at 125 W. Route 66 Ave.
- The Alley Saloon Building – was built in 1910 and is located at 109 W. Railroad.
- The Tetlaff Building – was built in 1897 and is located at 137 W. Railroad Ave. The building was once a saloon, a bordello, a rooming house and an opium den. it is located in the section of the own which once was known as "Saloon Row"
- The Cabinet Saloon Building – was built in 1895 and is located at 141 W. Railroad Ave. Thebuling appeared in the 1988 Movie "Midnight Run" and in 1994, was presented the "Arizona Main Street Historic Design award"
- The Red Cross Garage Building – was built in 1913 and is located at 221 W. Railroad Ave.
Historic Contributing Buildings

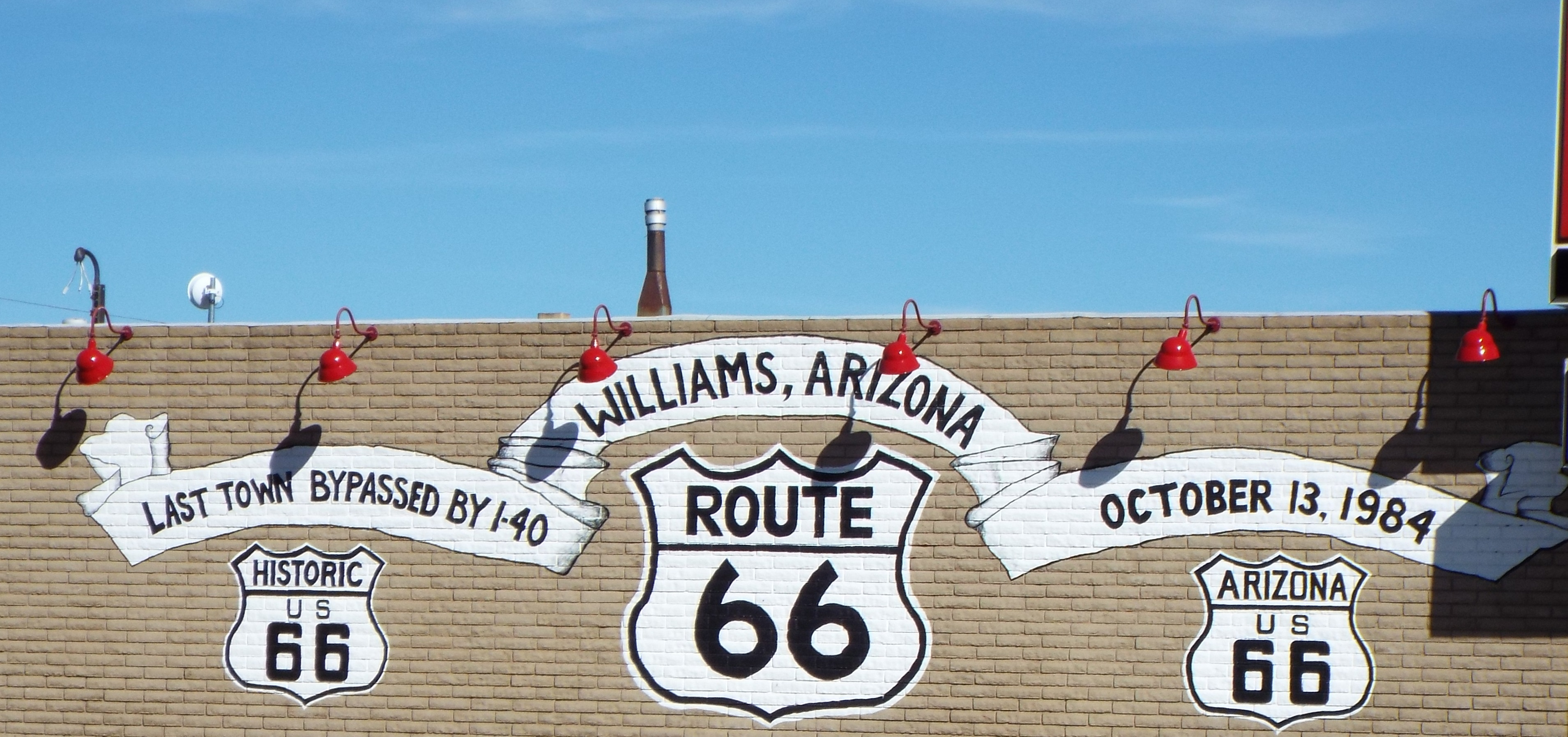
Route 66 mural

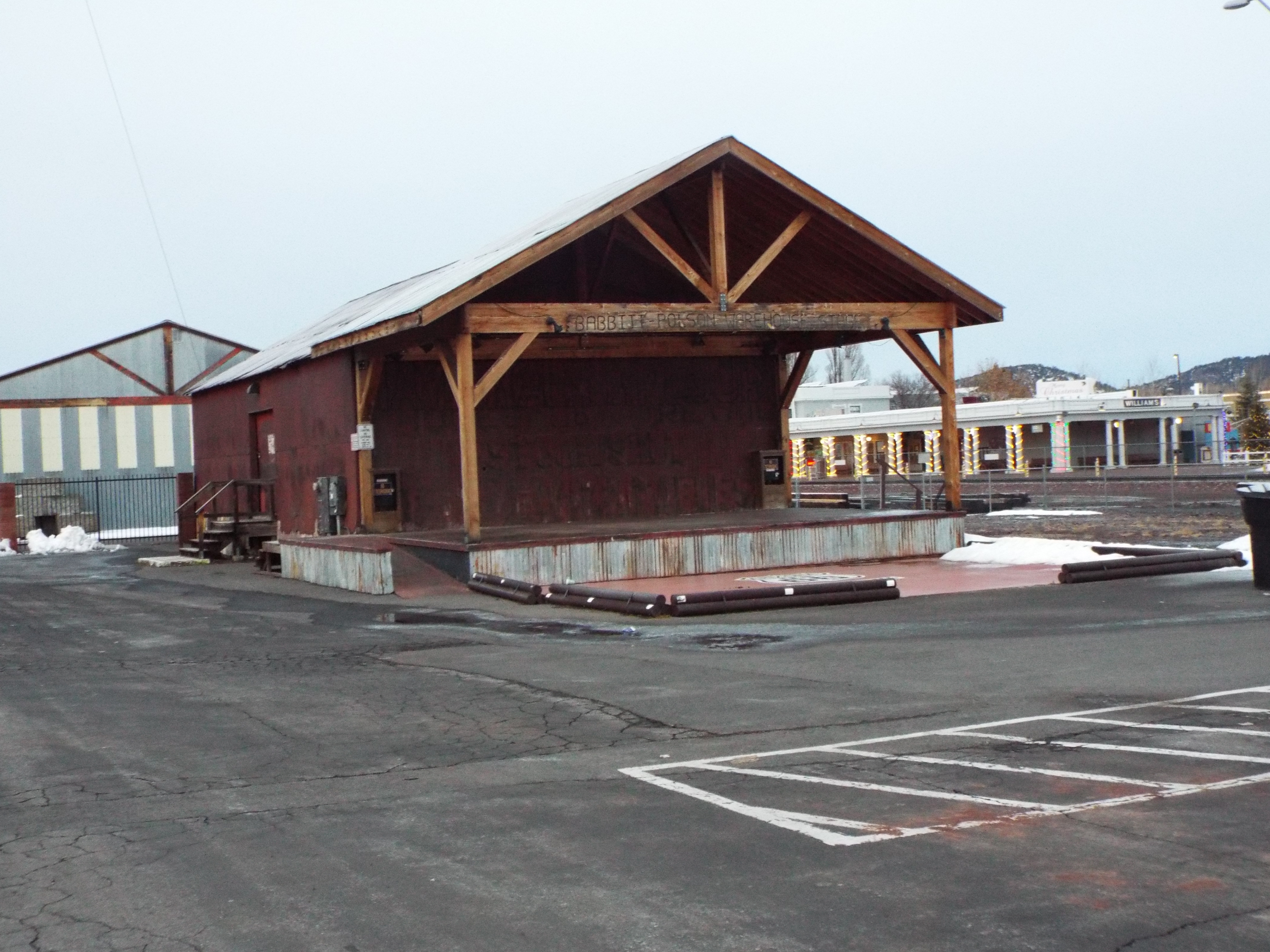
The Babbitt-Polson Warehouse – 1890

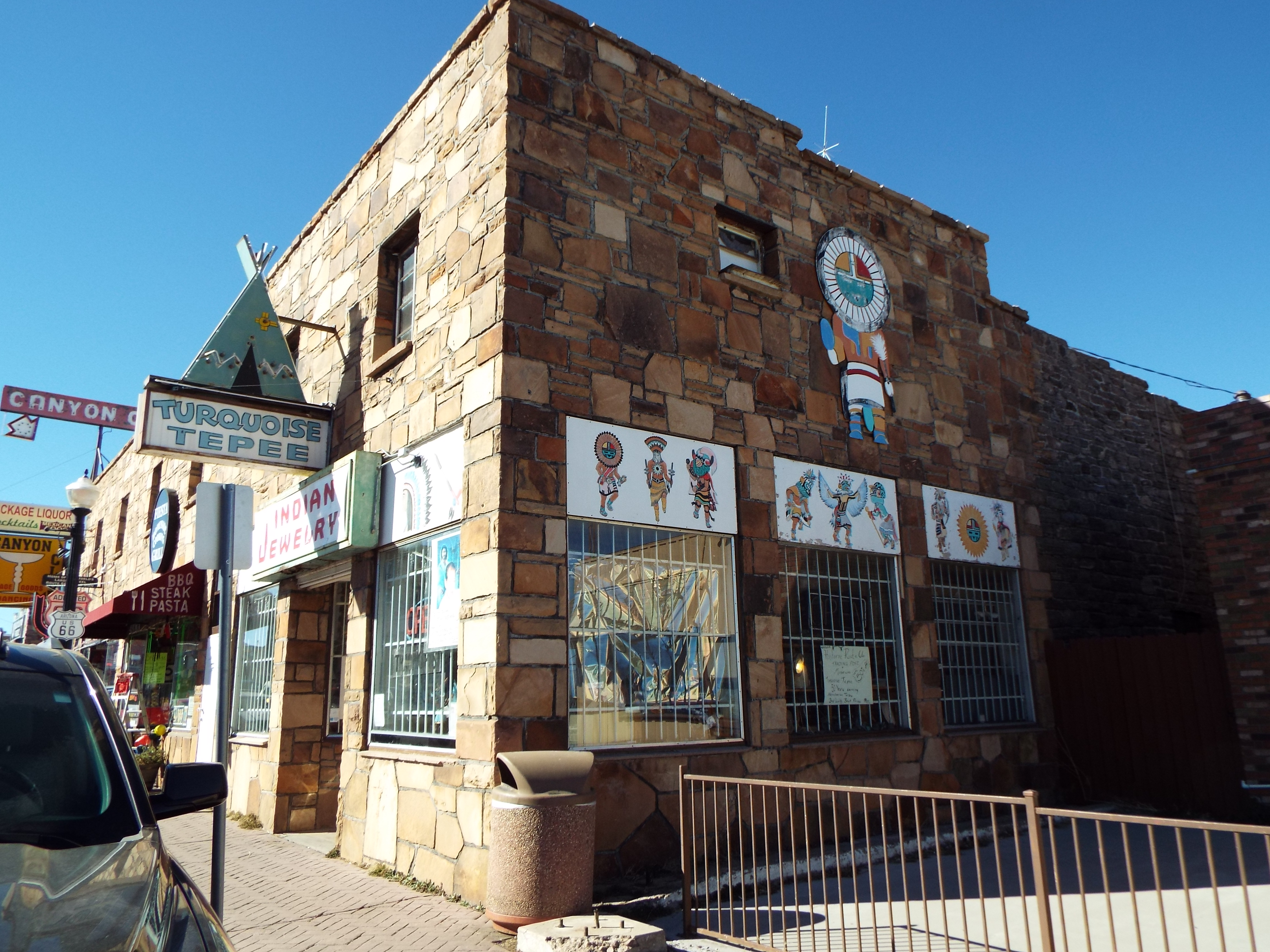
The Bowden Building – 1947

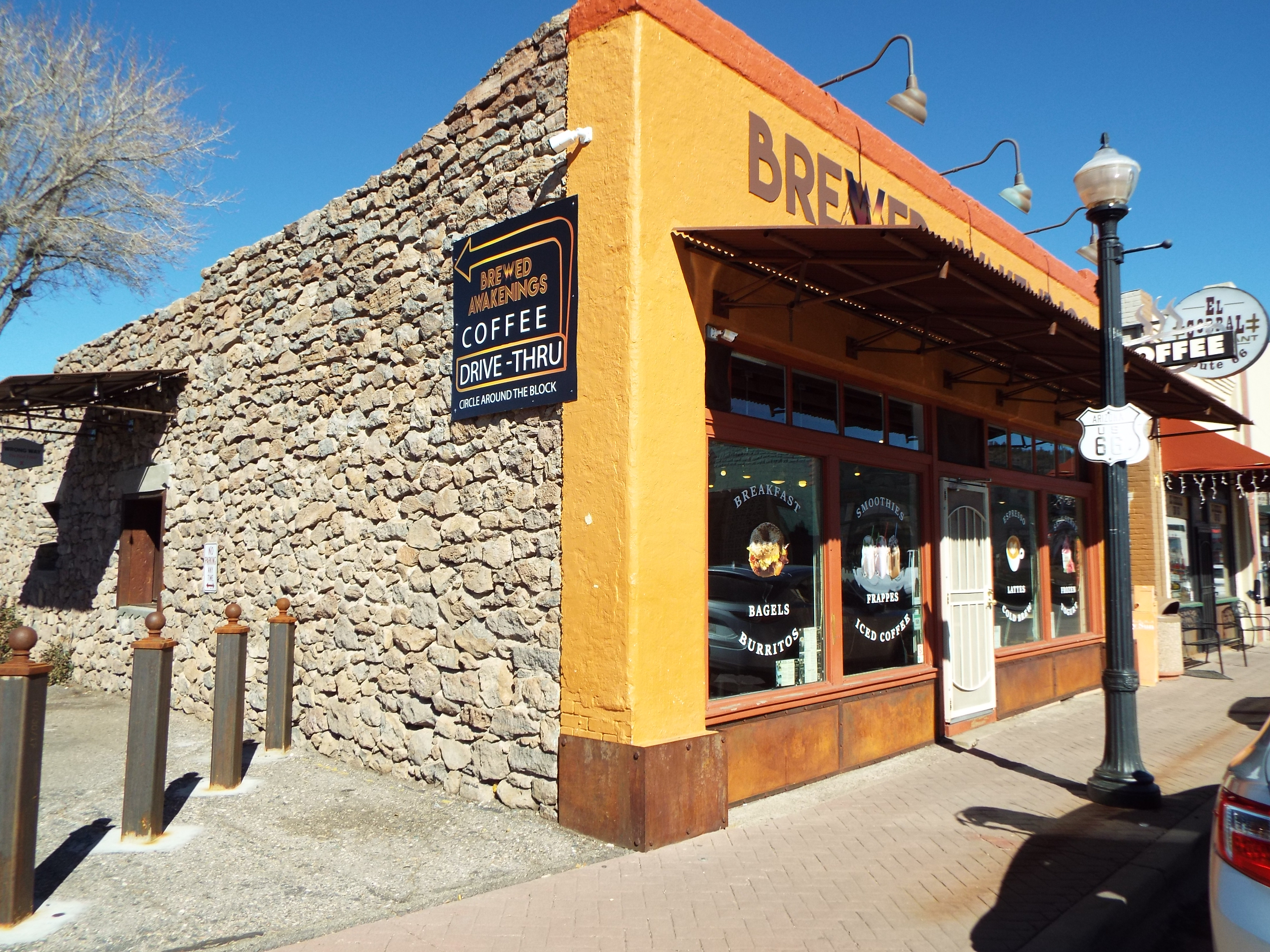
The Rock Building – 1936

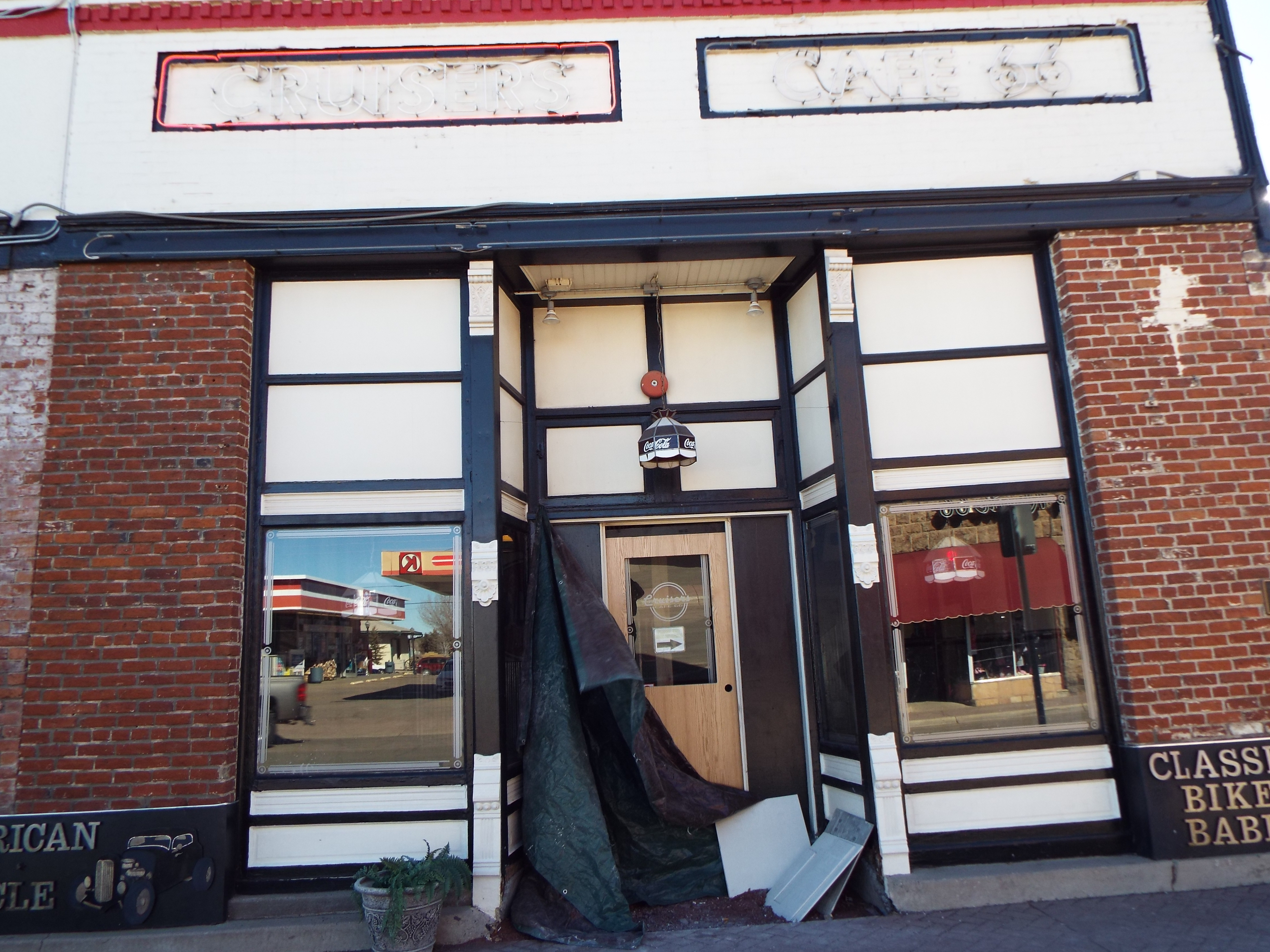
The Postal Telegraph/Bennitt Auto Building – 1910

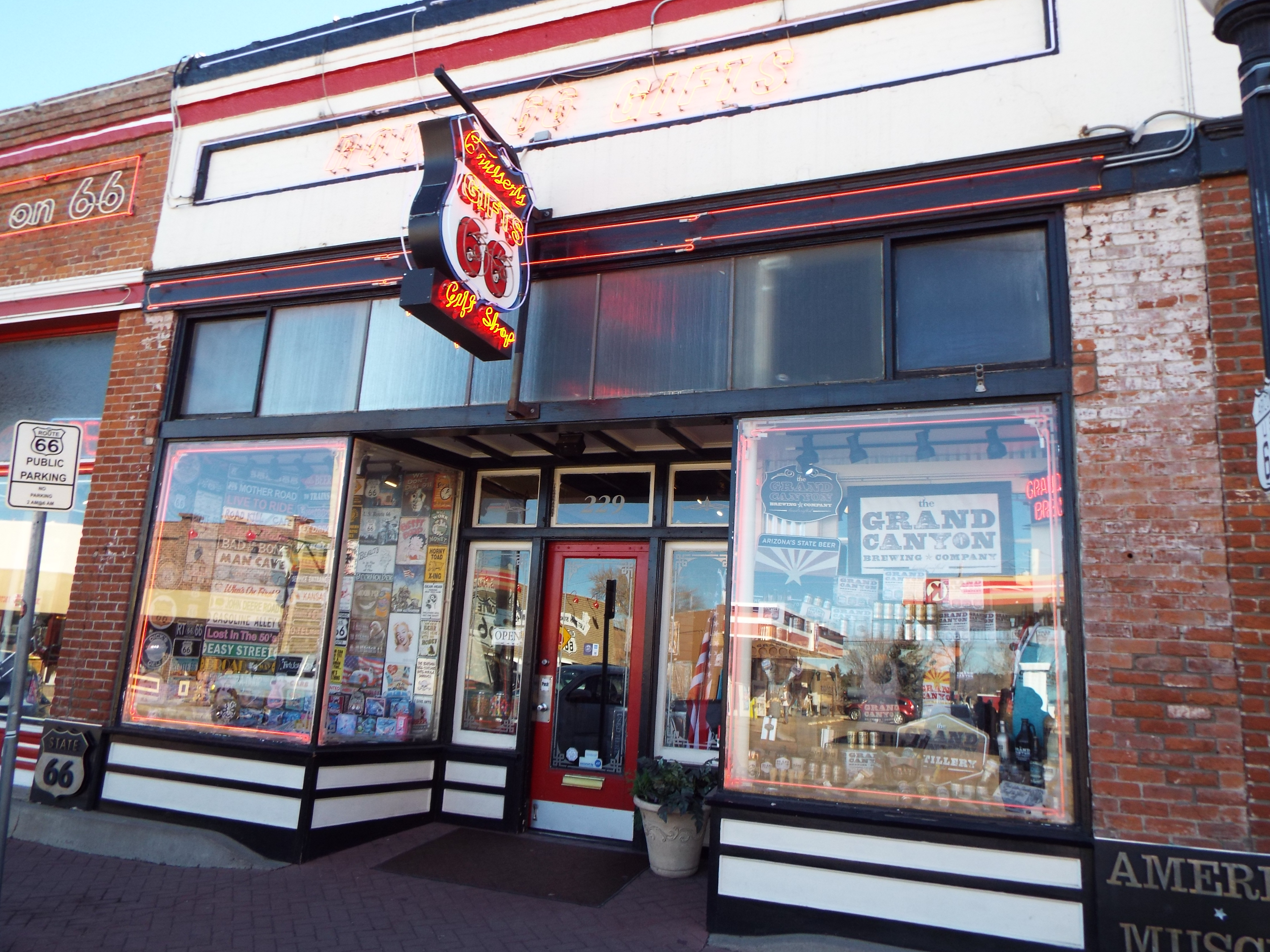
The White Horse Trading Co. Building – 1910

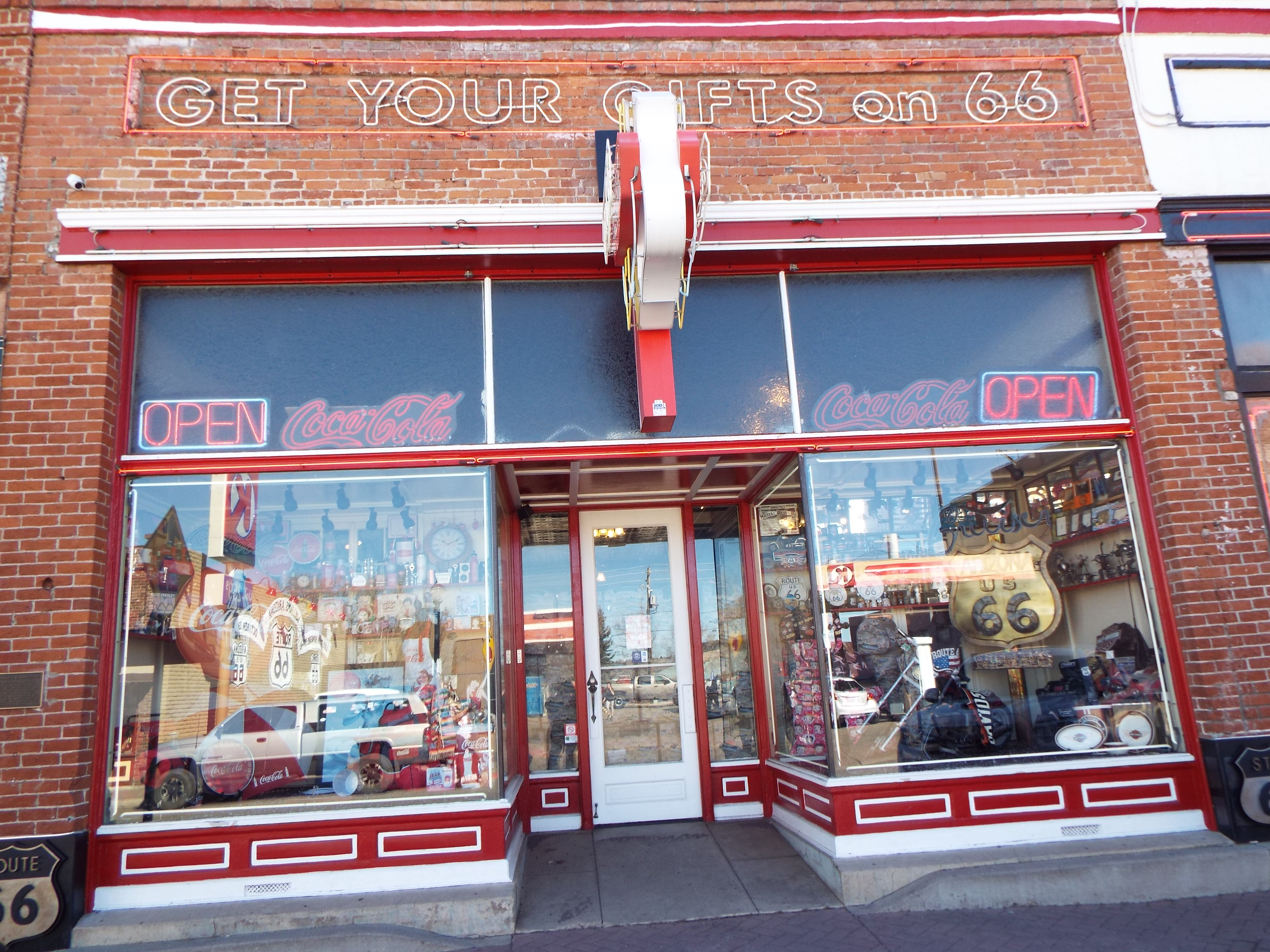
The Rittenhouse Haberdashery Building – 1910

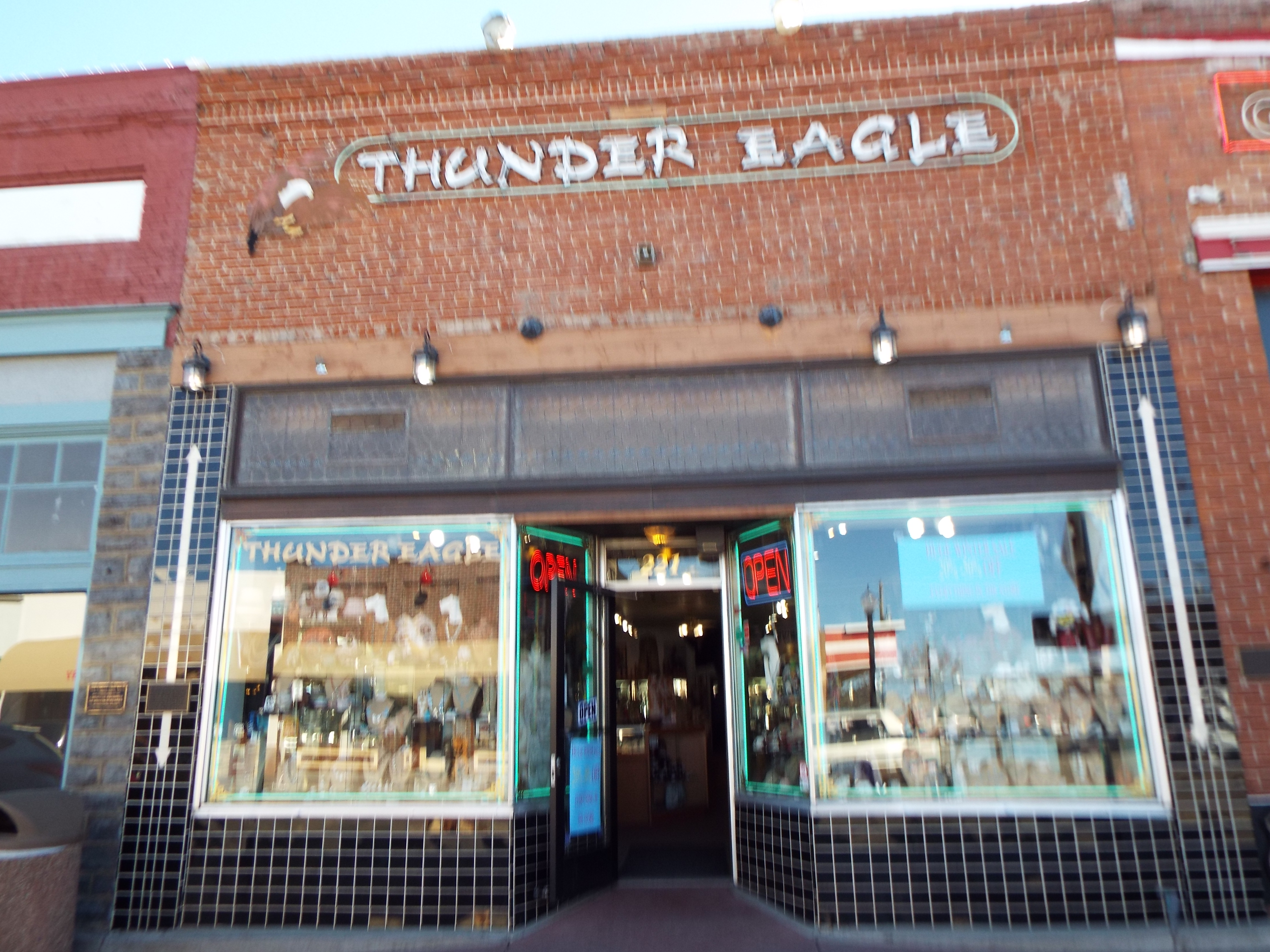
The Grand Canyon Drug Co. Building – 1912

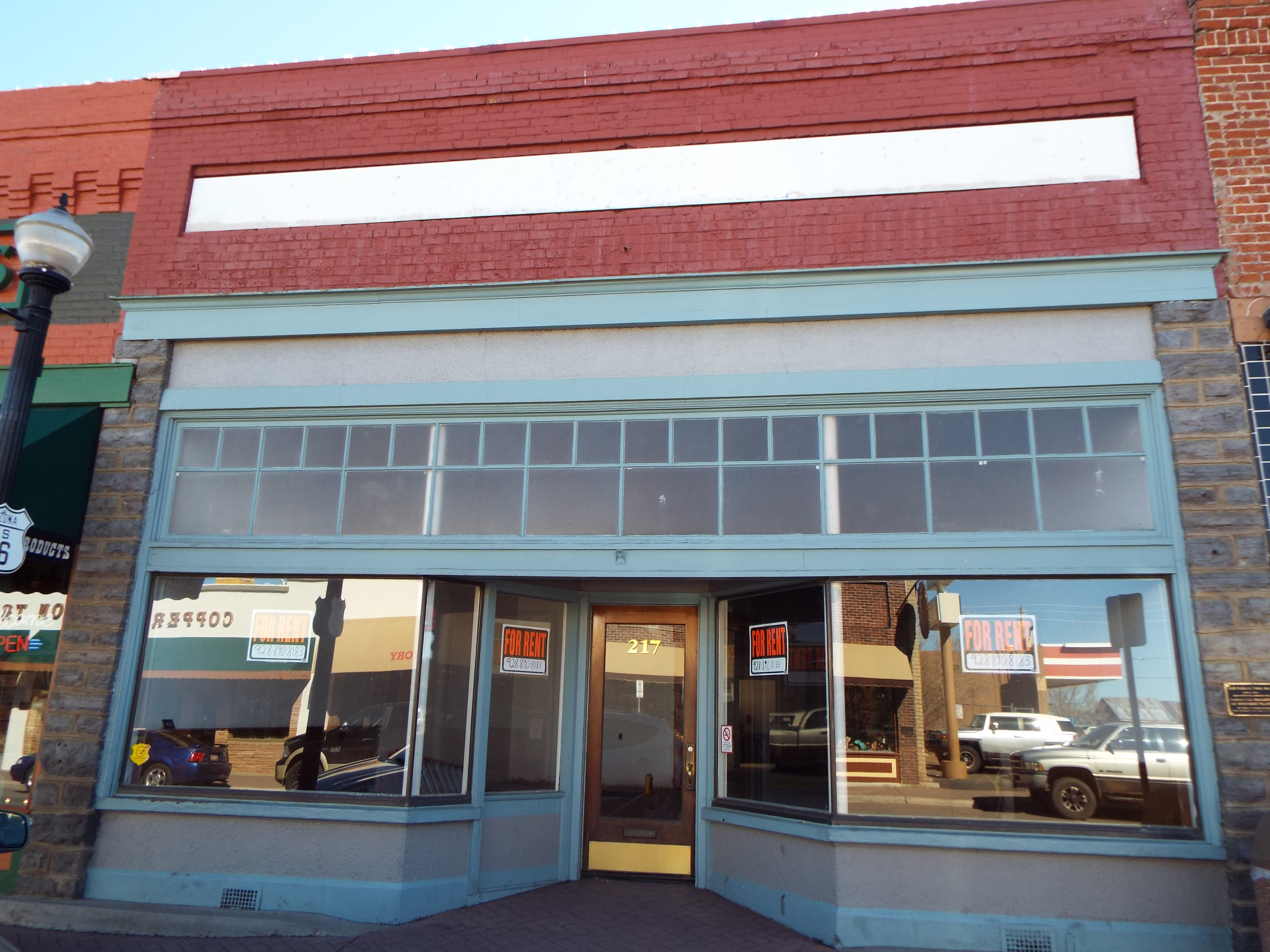
The Old Pool Parlor Building – 1910

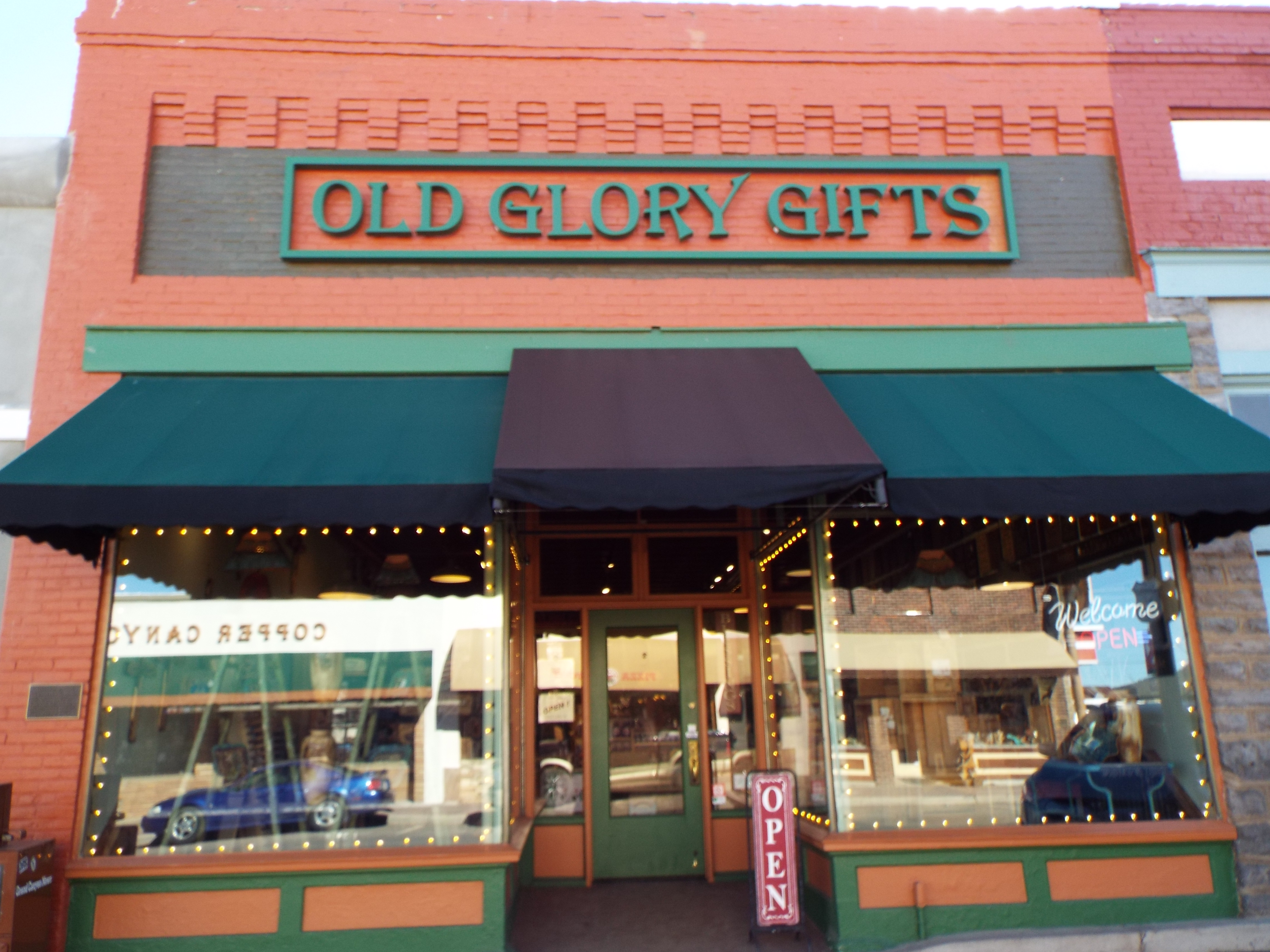
The Lebeach Confectionery Building – 1914

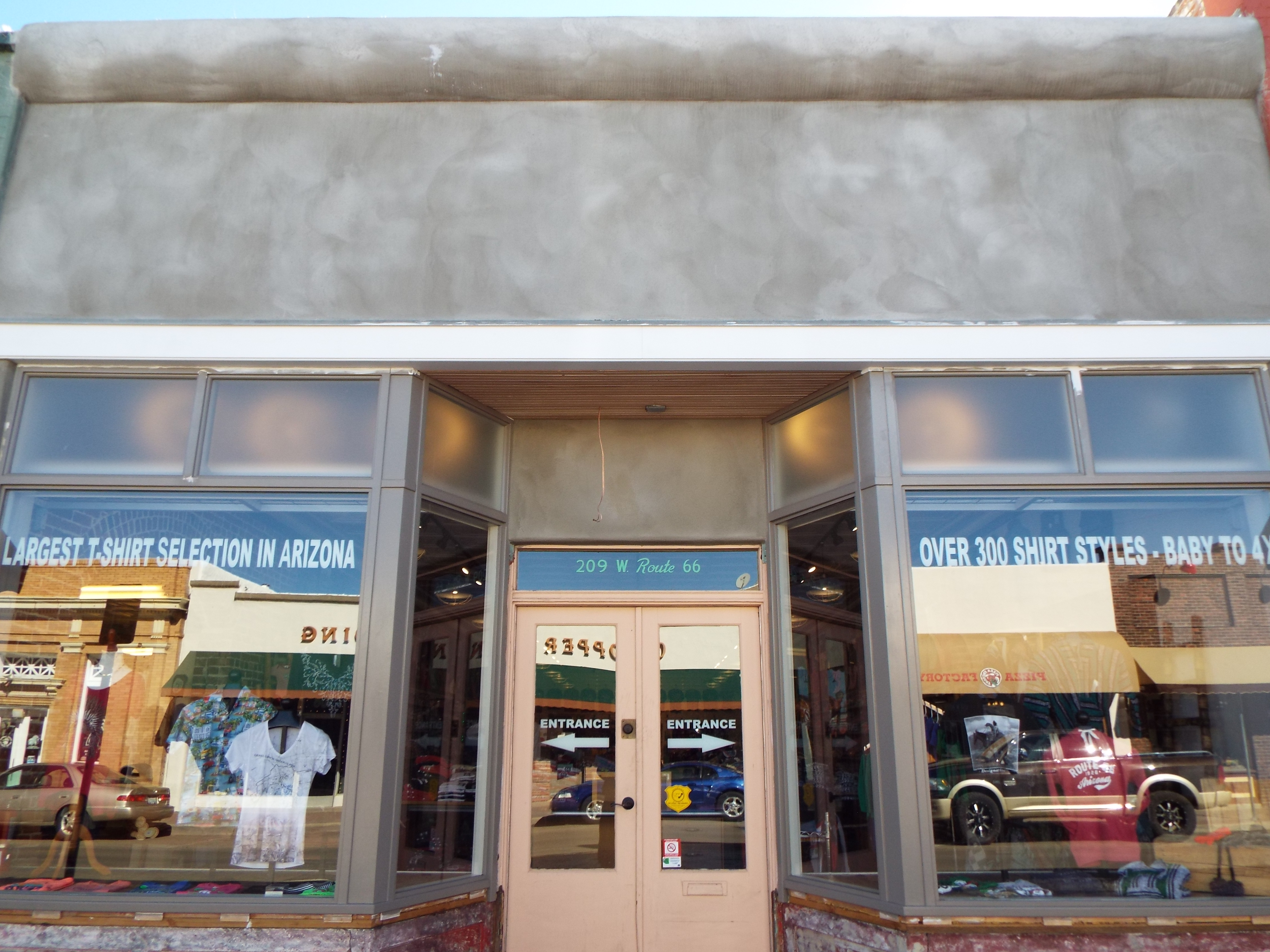
The Dime Store Building – 1912

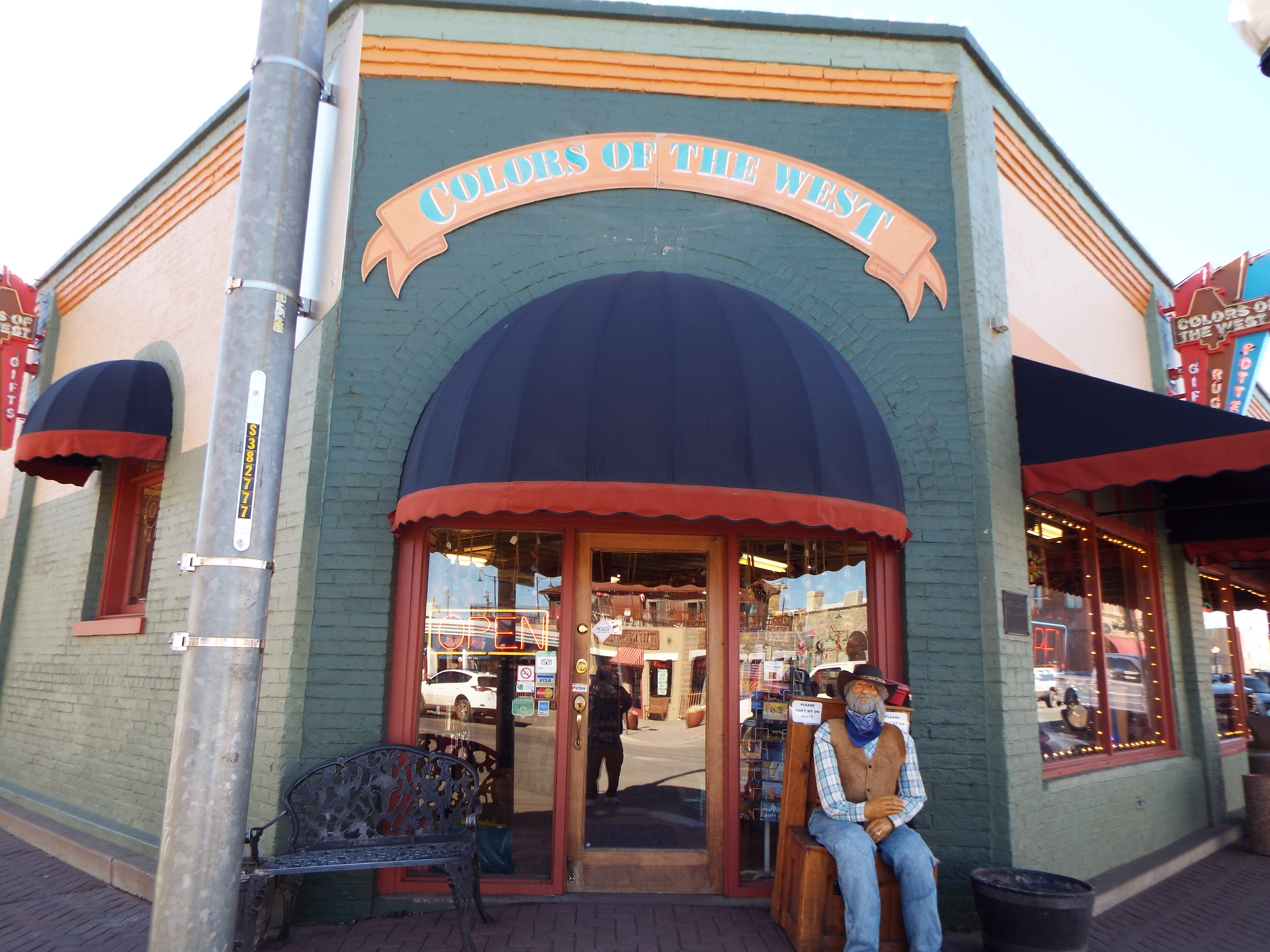
Duffy Brothers Grocery Building – 1912

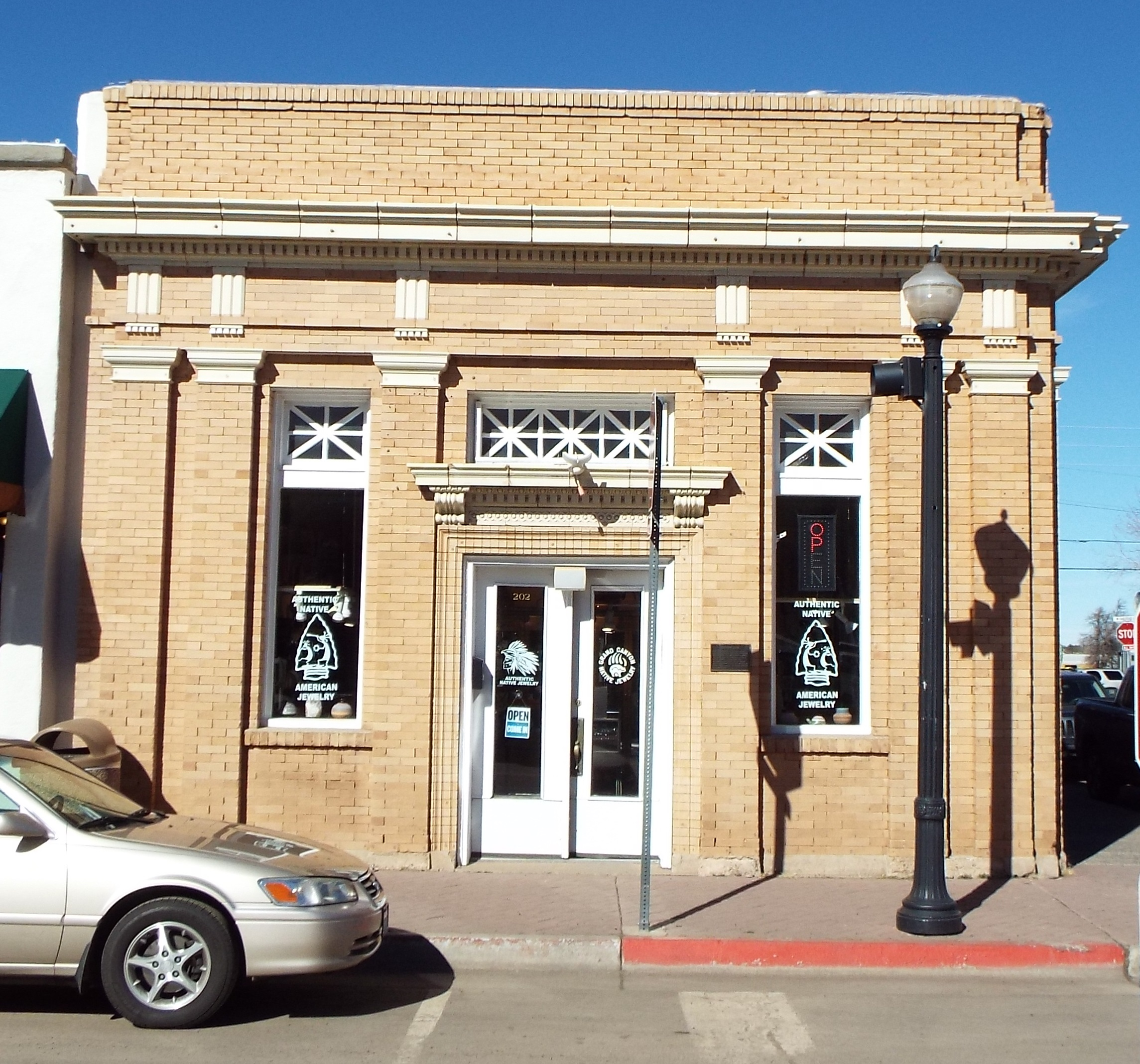
The Citizens Bank Building – 1918

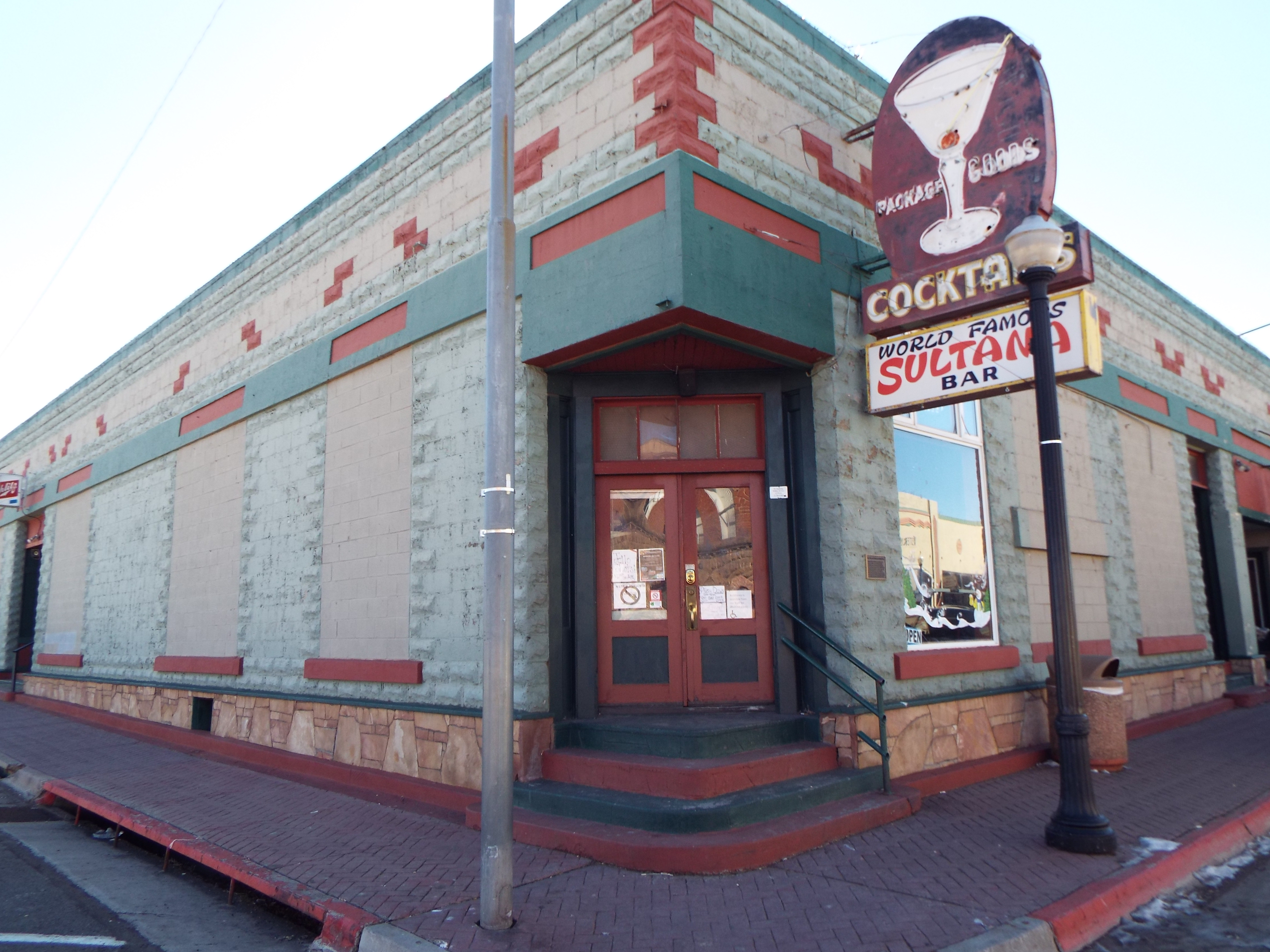
The Sultana Theatre Building – 1912

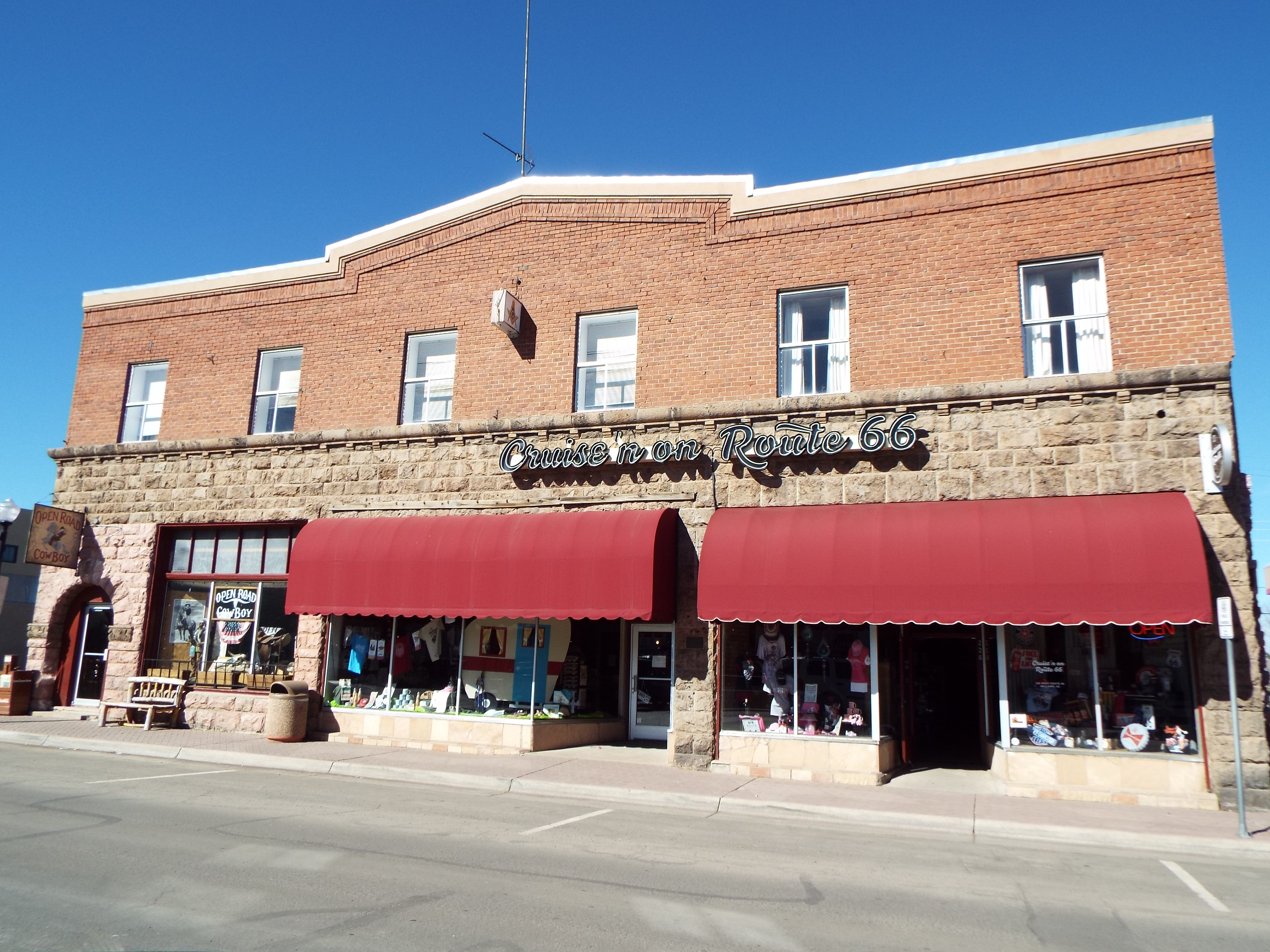
The Pollock Building – 1901

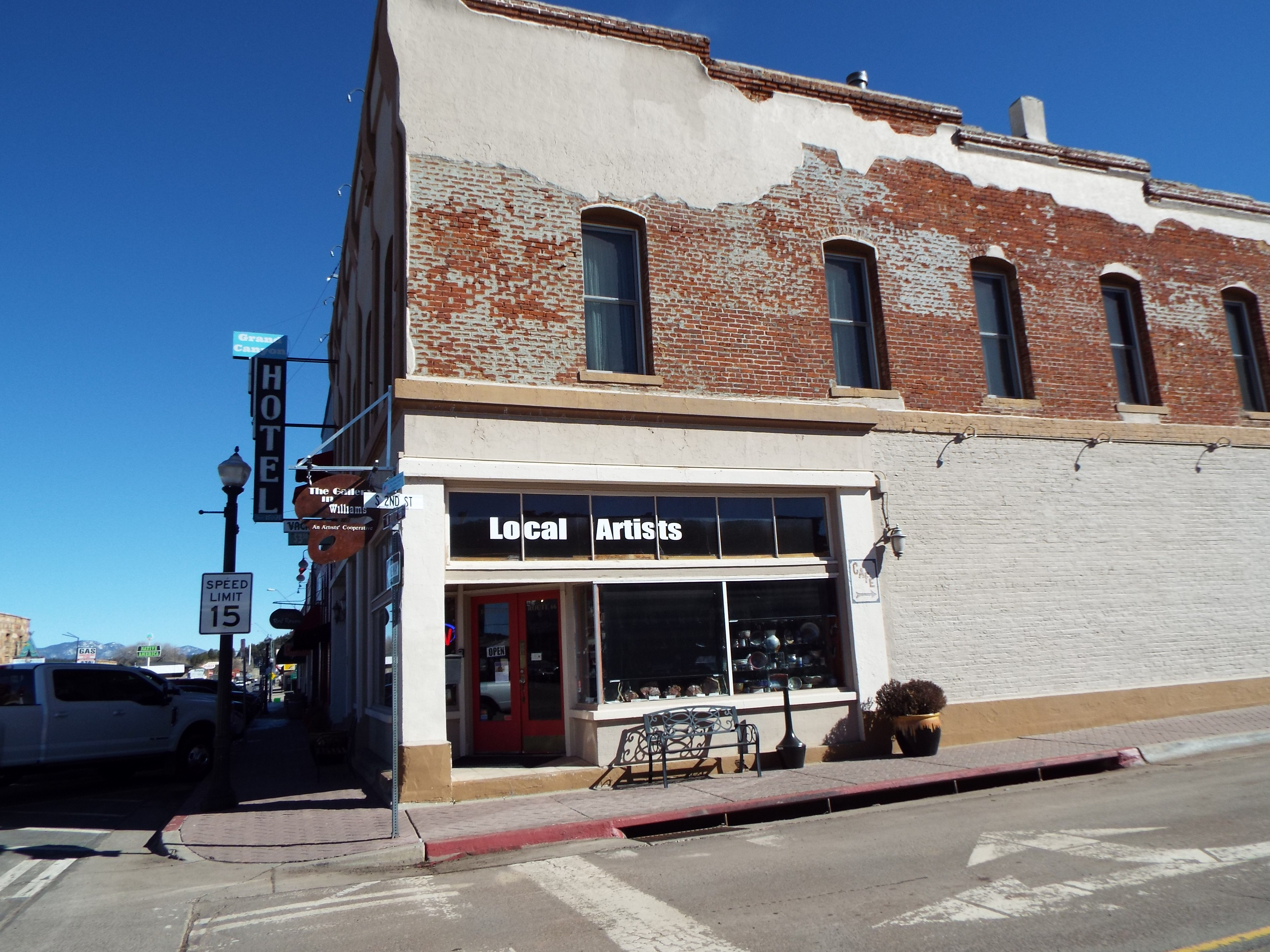
The Grand Canyon Hotel Building – 1912

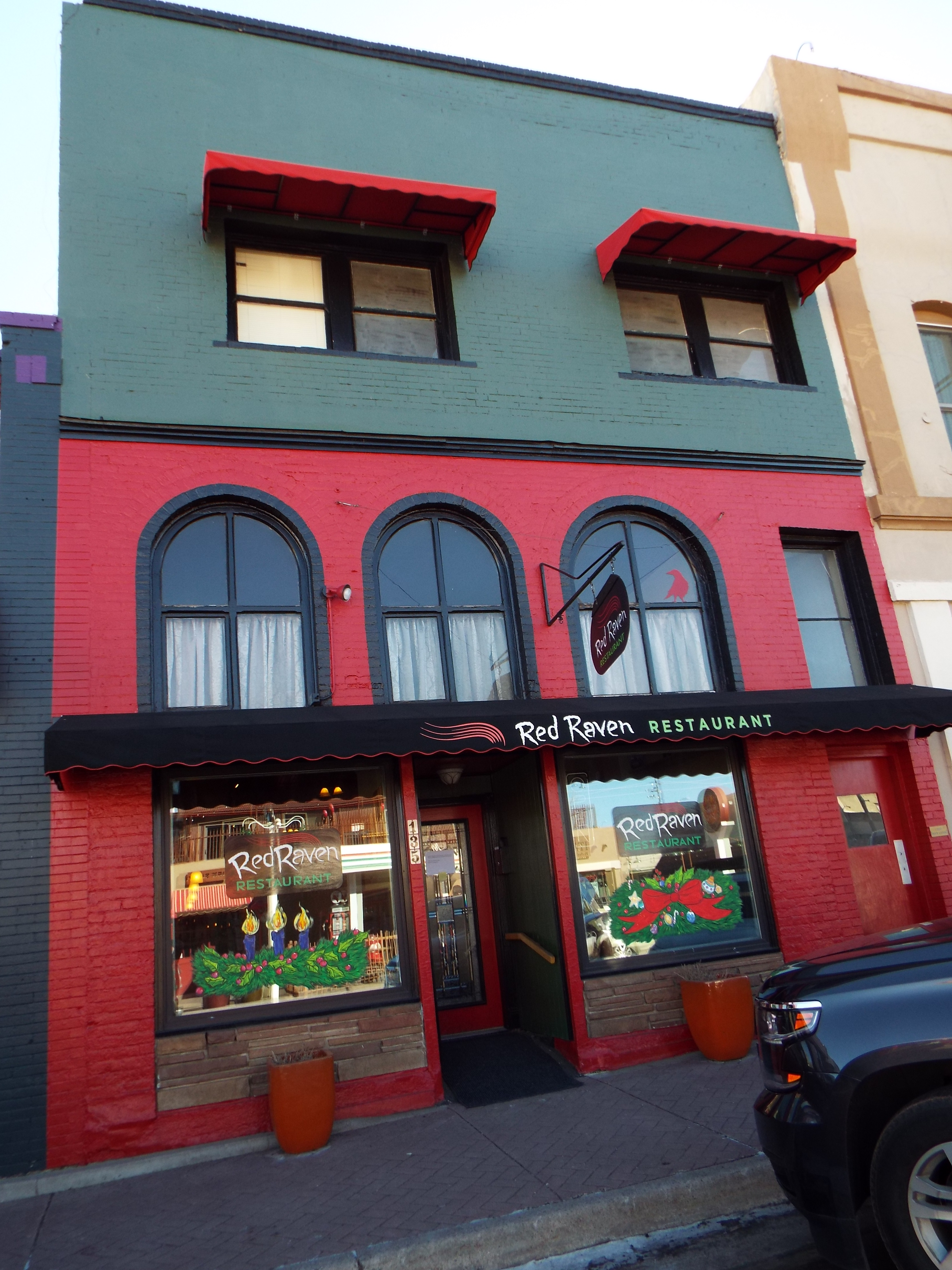
The Old Williams Fire Station – 1907

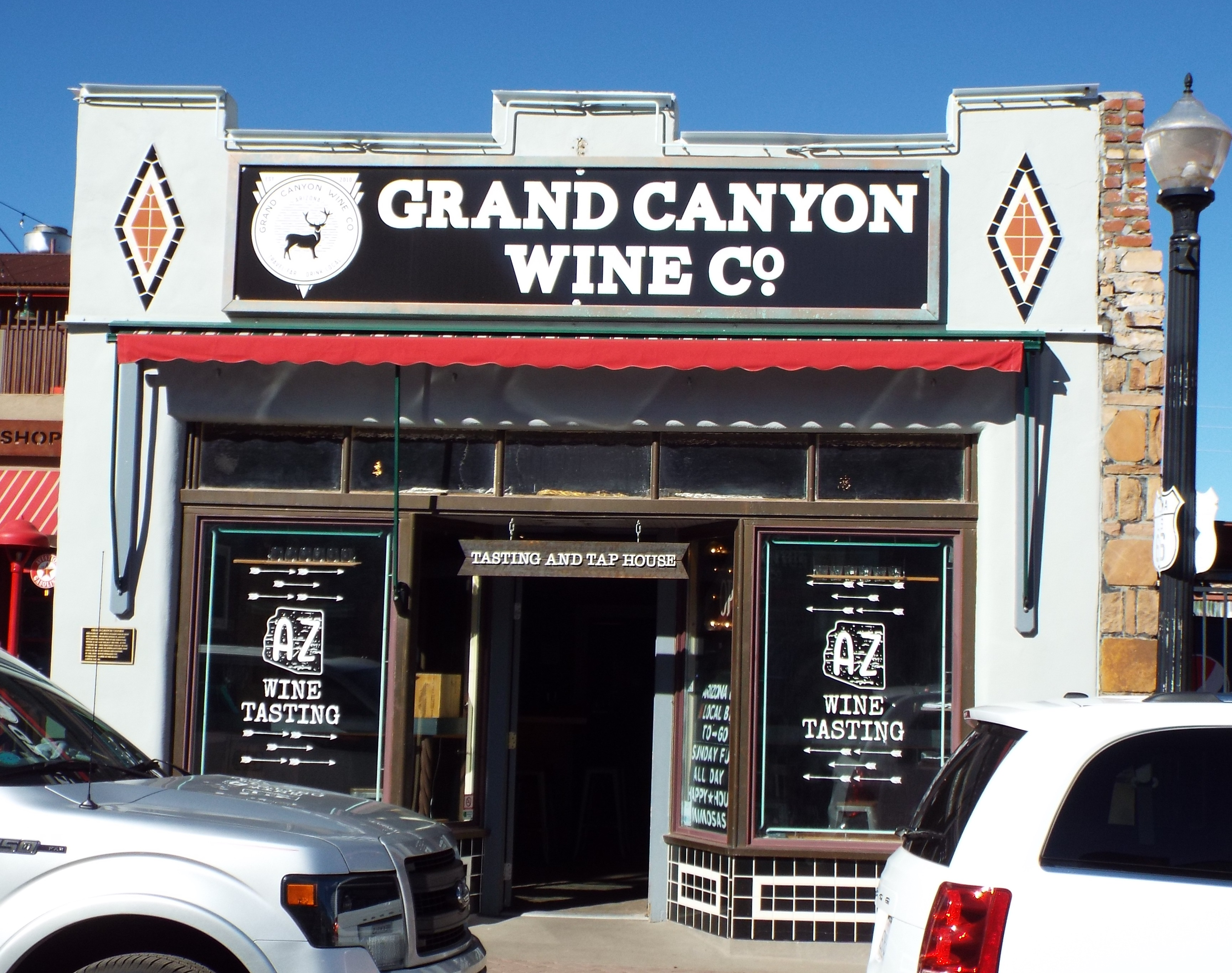
The Old Williams Post Office Building – 1907

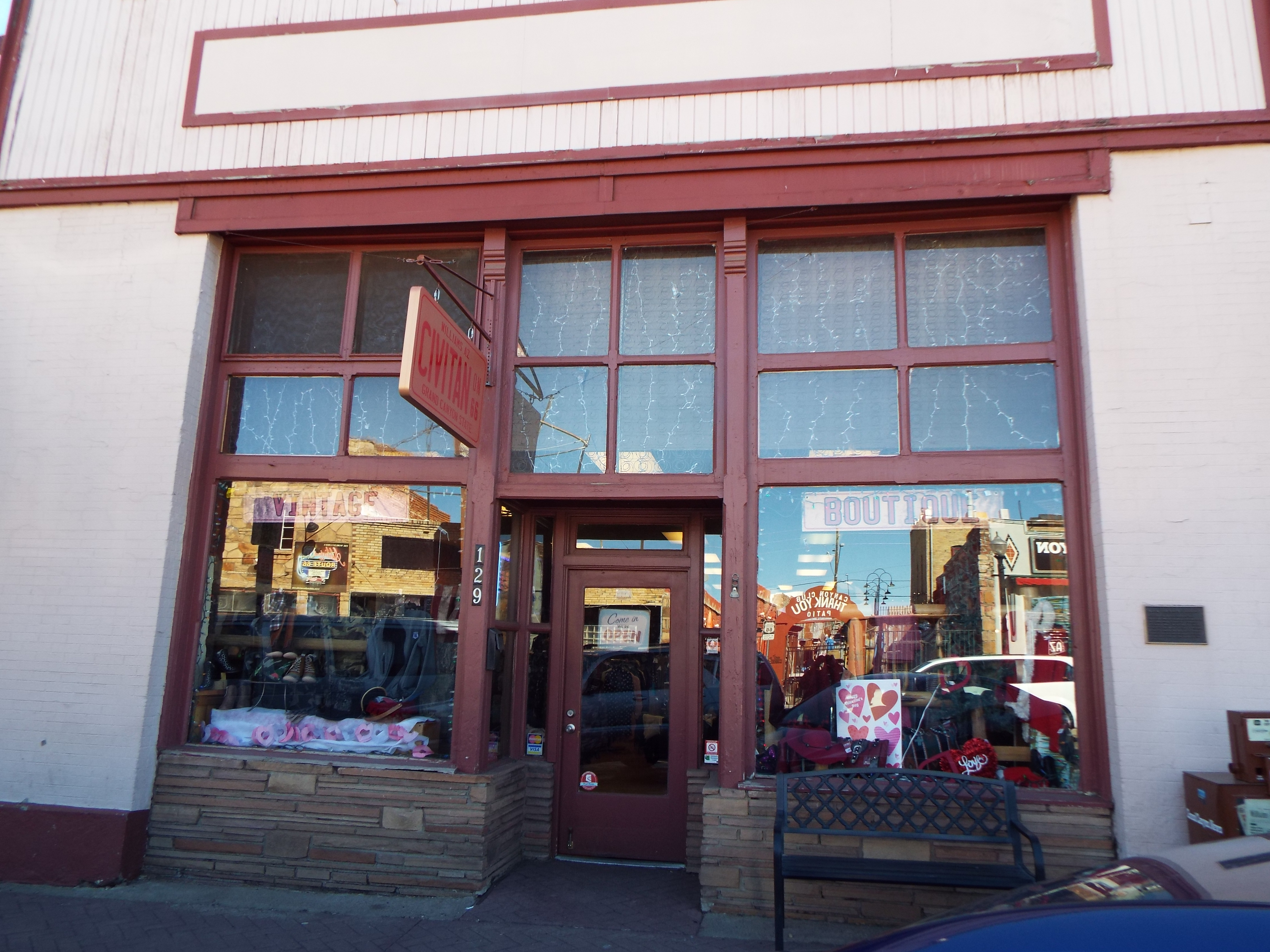
The General Store Building – 1907

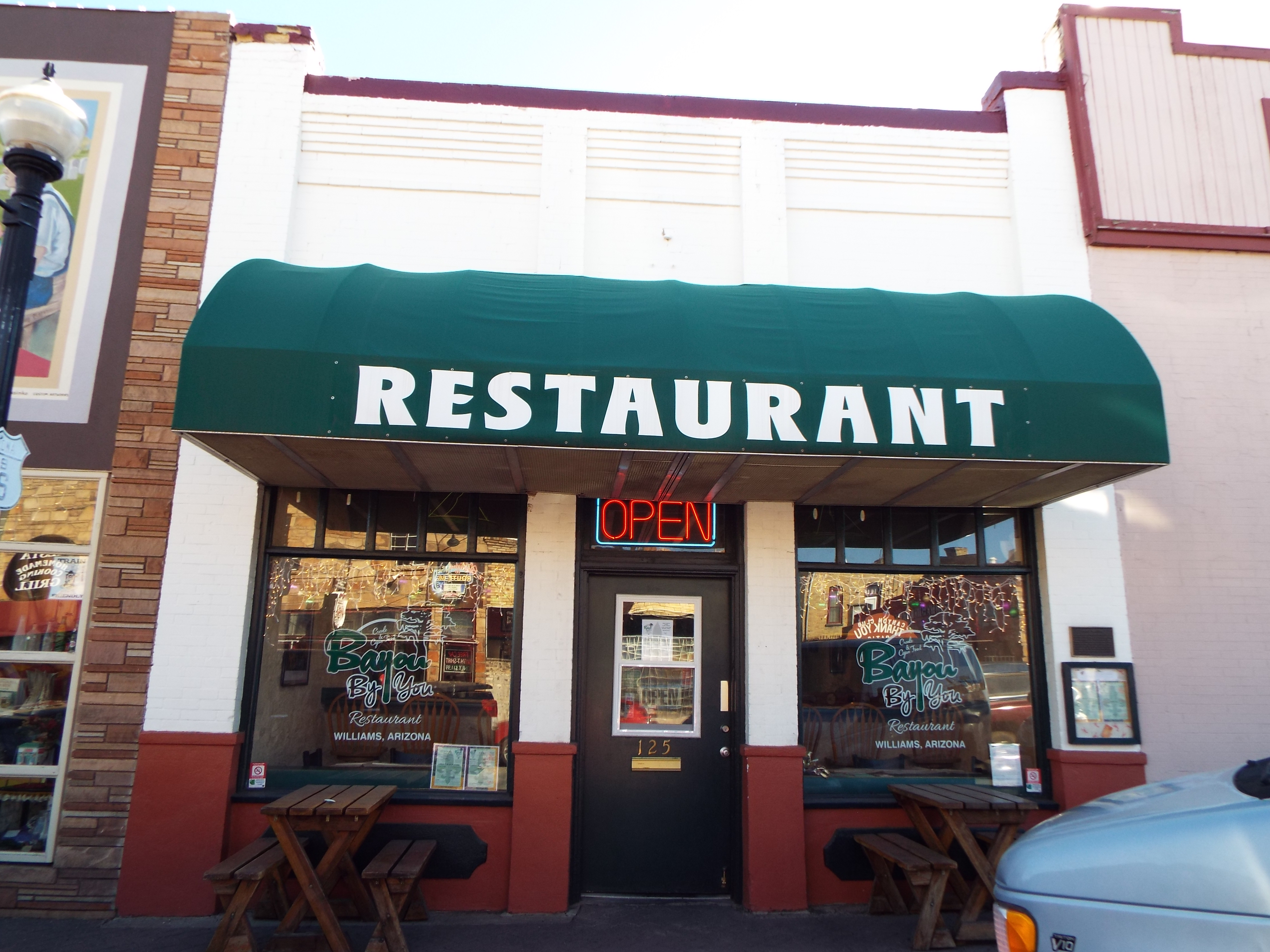
The Adams Grocery Store Building – 1907

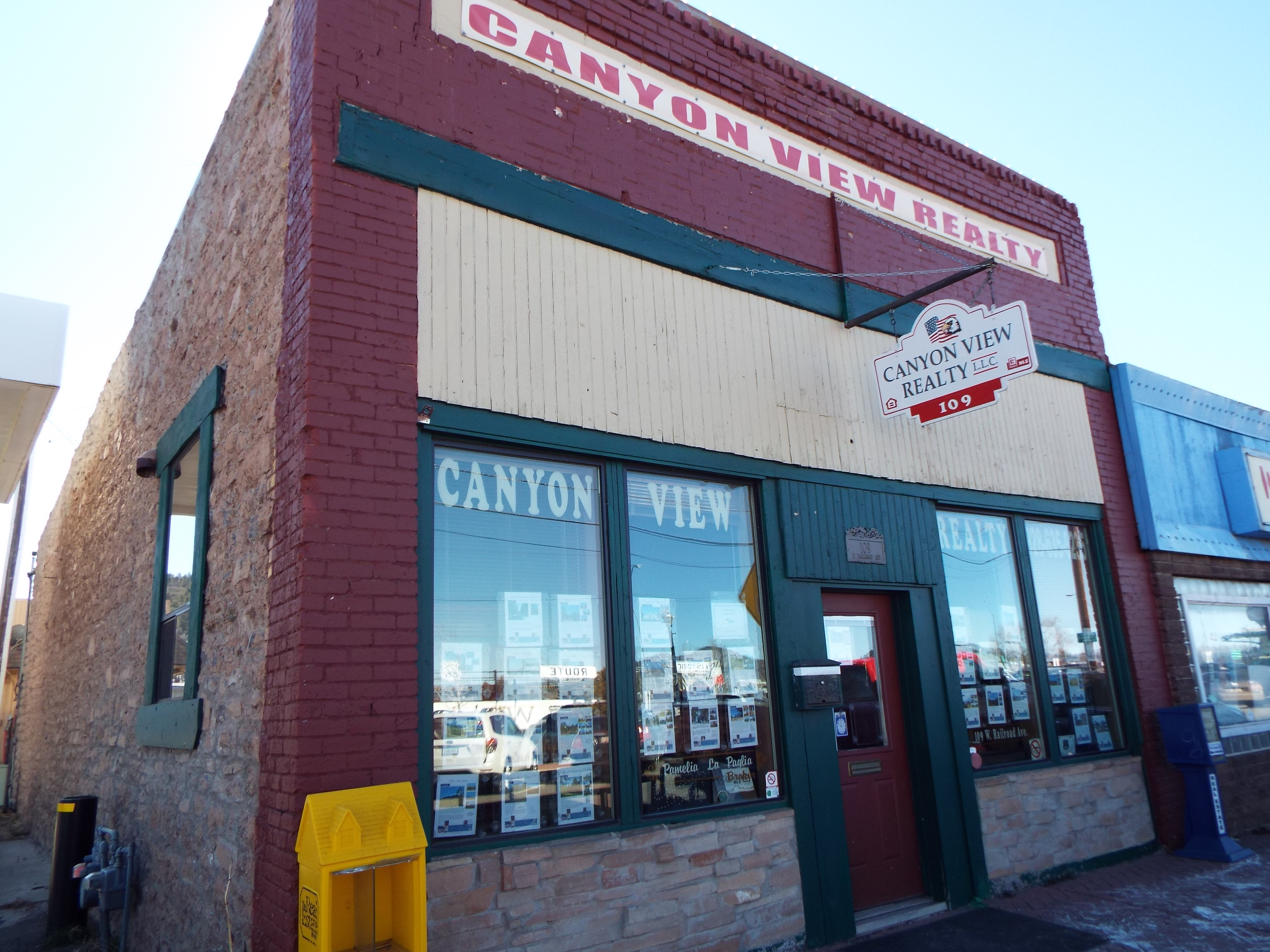
The Alley Saloon Building – 1910

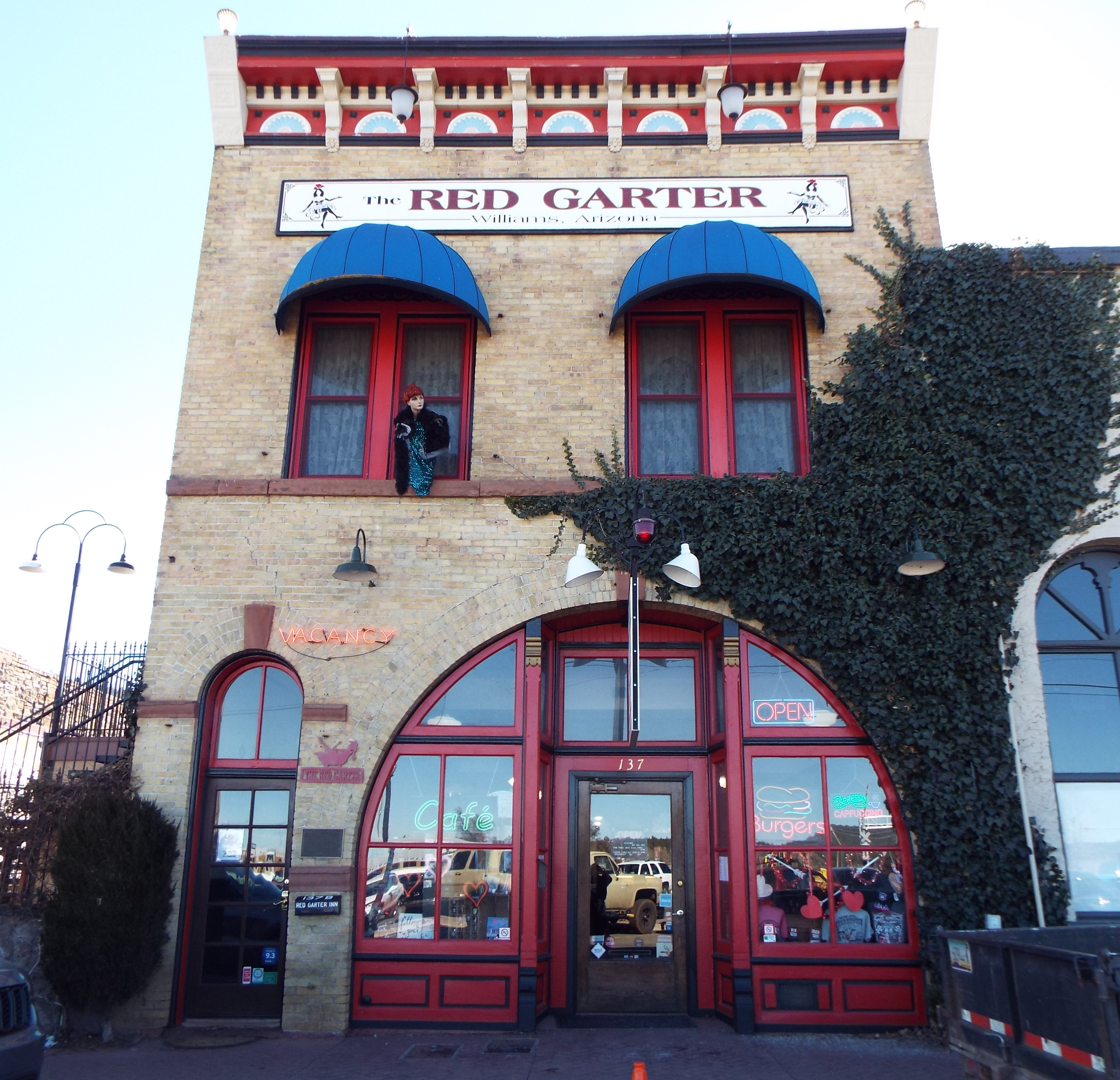
The Tetzlaff Building – 1897

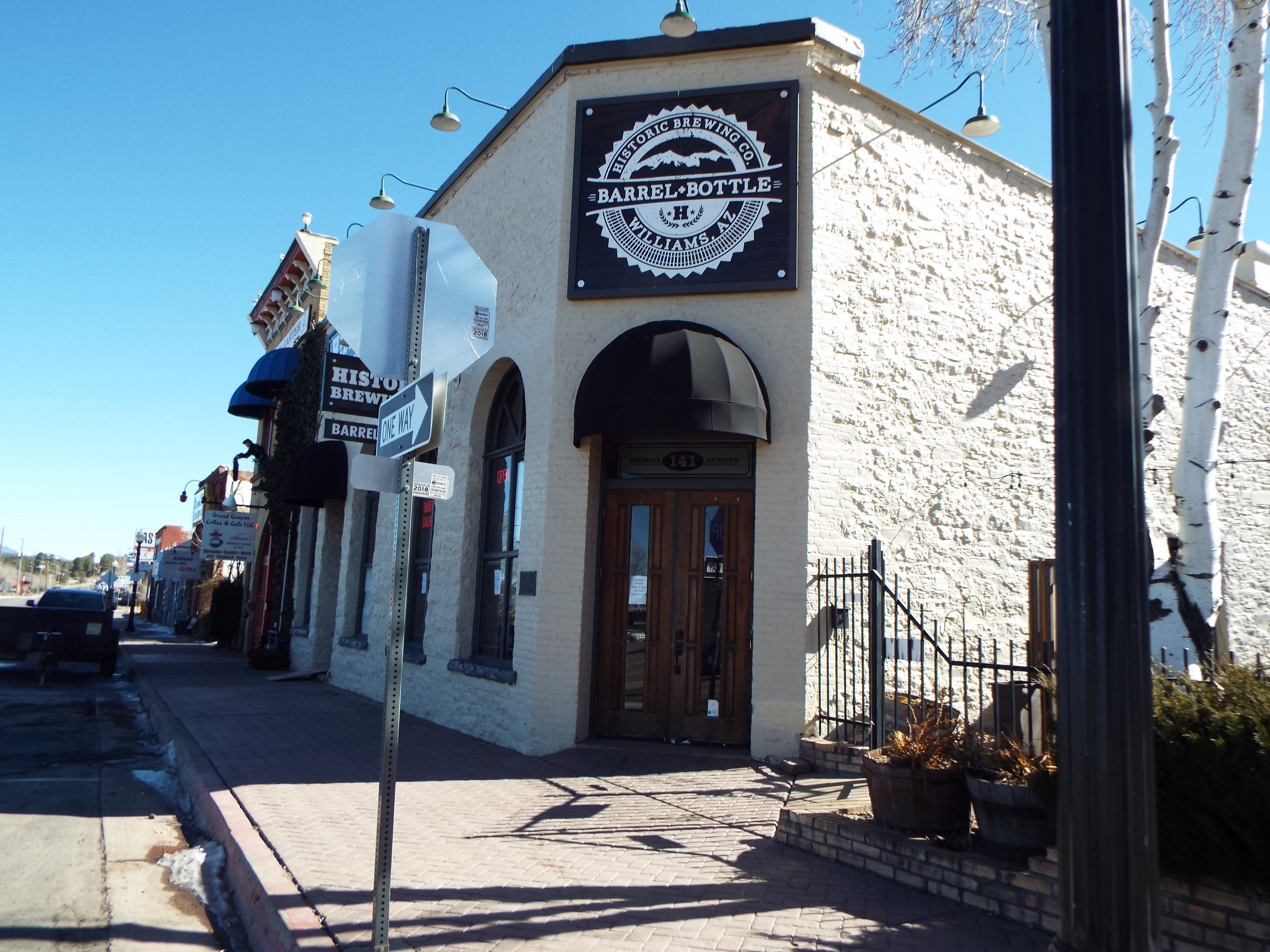
The Cabinet Saloon Building – 1895

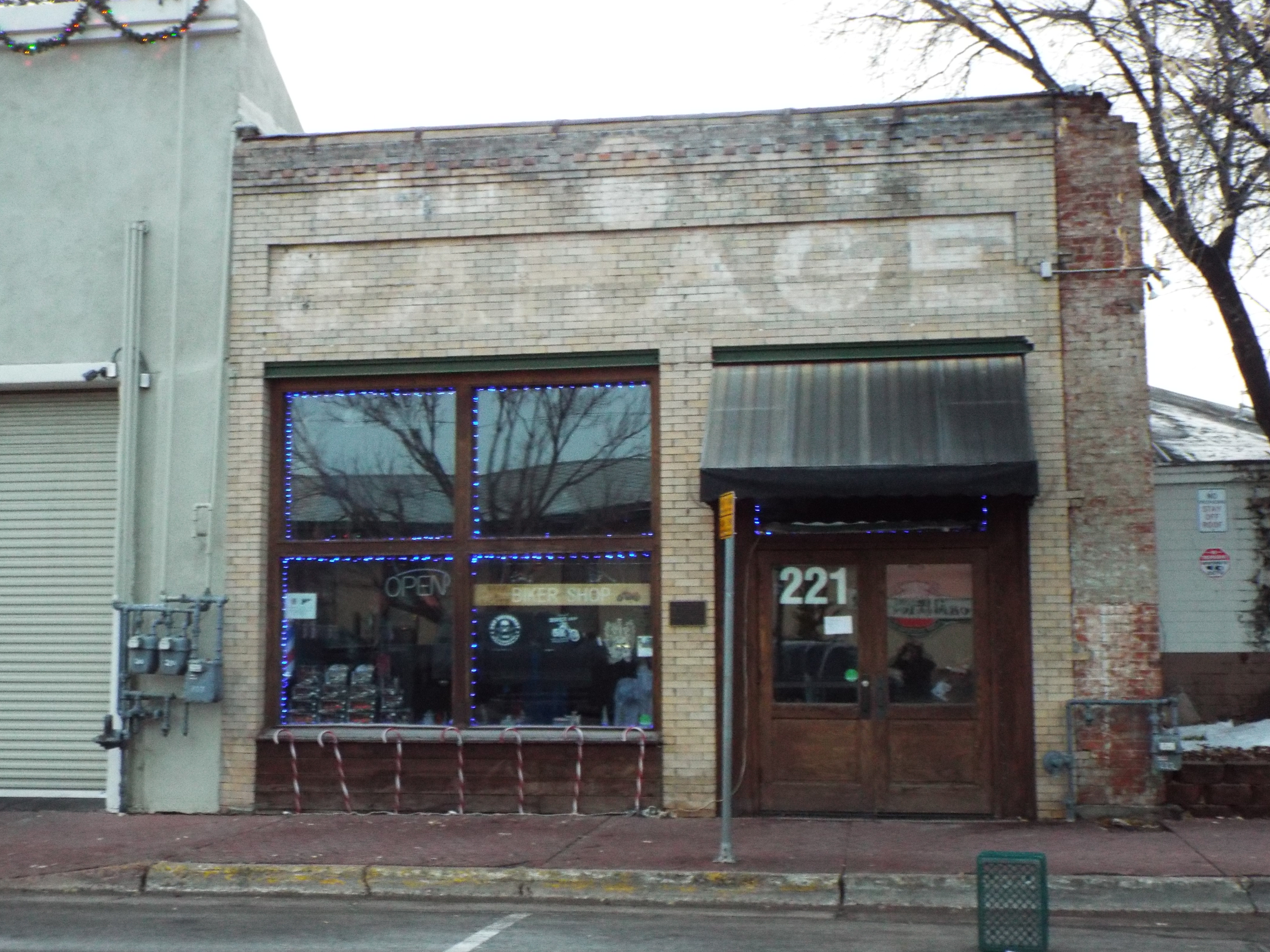
The Red Cross Garage – 1913

Tourism became a very important economic factor for the town. Williams offered train service to and from the Grand Canyon South Rim. The tourist who traveled to Williams by automobile played an important role in the economy development of the town. The existence of service stations and motels was directly related to the tourist traffic in the area. Many of the older service stations have currently been converted into restaurants. Pictured are some of these structures who played an important role in the automotive tourist traffic in Williams.

- The 9 Arizona Motor Hotel – was built in 1923 and is located at 315 W Route 66. In accordance to the Route 66 "Historic Resource Survey", this property is eligible to be listed individually in the National Register of Historic Places.
- The Old Mobil Gas Station (now Cruiser's Route 66 Café) – was built in 1930 and is located at 233 W Route 66.
- Pete's Gas Station Museum – was built in 1949 and is located at 101 E Route 66.
- The Old Texaco Gas Station (now Station 66 Italian Bistro) – was built in 1930 and is located at 144 W Route 66.
- The DelSue Motor Inn – a combination full service Standard Gas Station and tourist court, built in the Spanish Colonial Style in 1936 and located at 234 E. Old U.S. Route 66. It was listed in the National Register of Historic Places on May 4, 1998, reference #98000356. The structure now operates as the Grand Motel.
Contributing structures in Williams Route 66

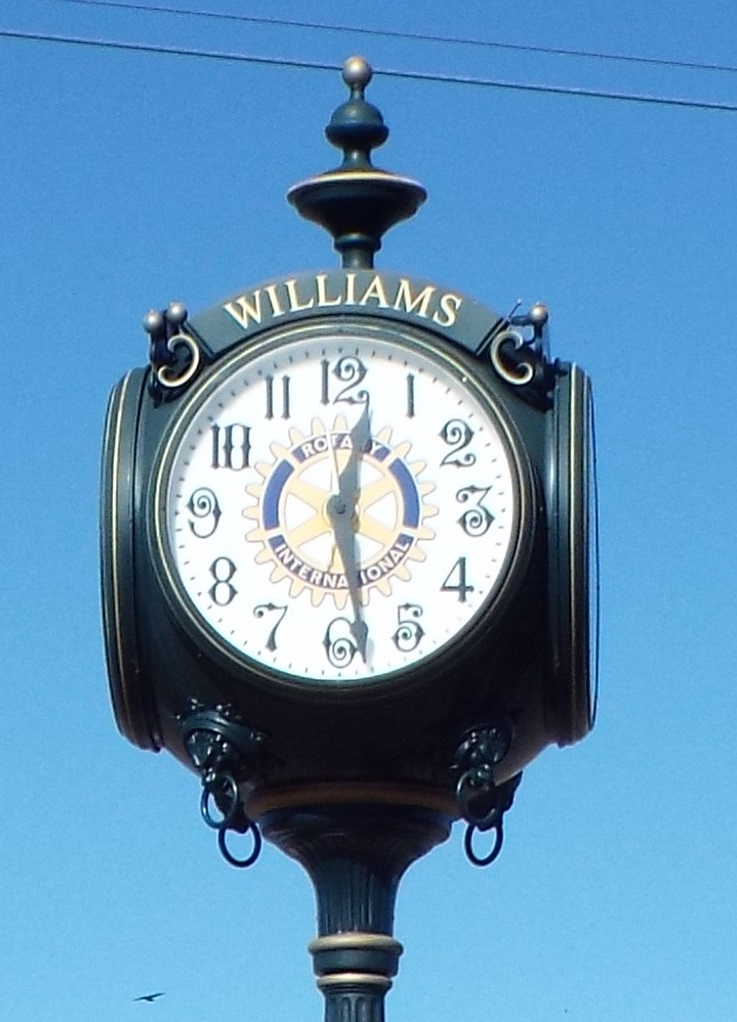
Williams Rotary International Clock

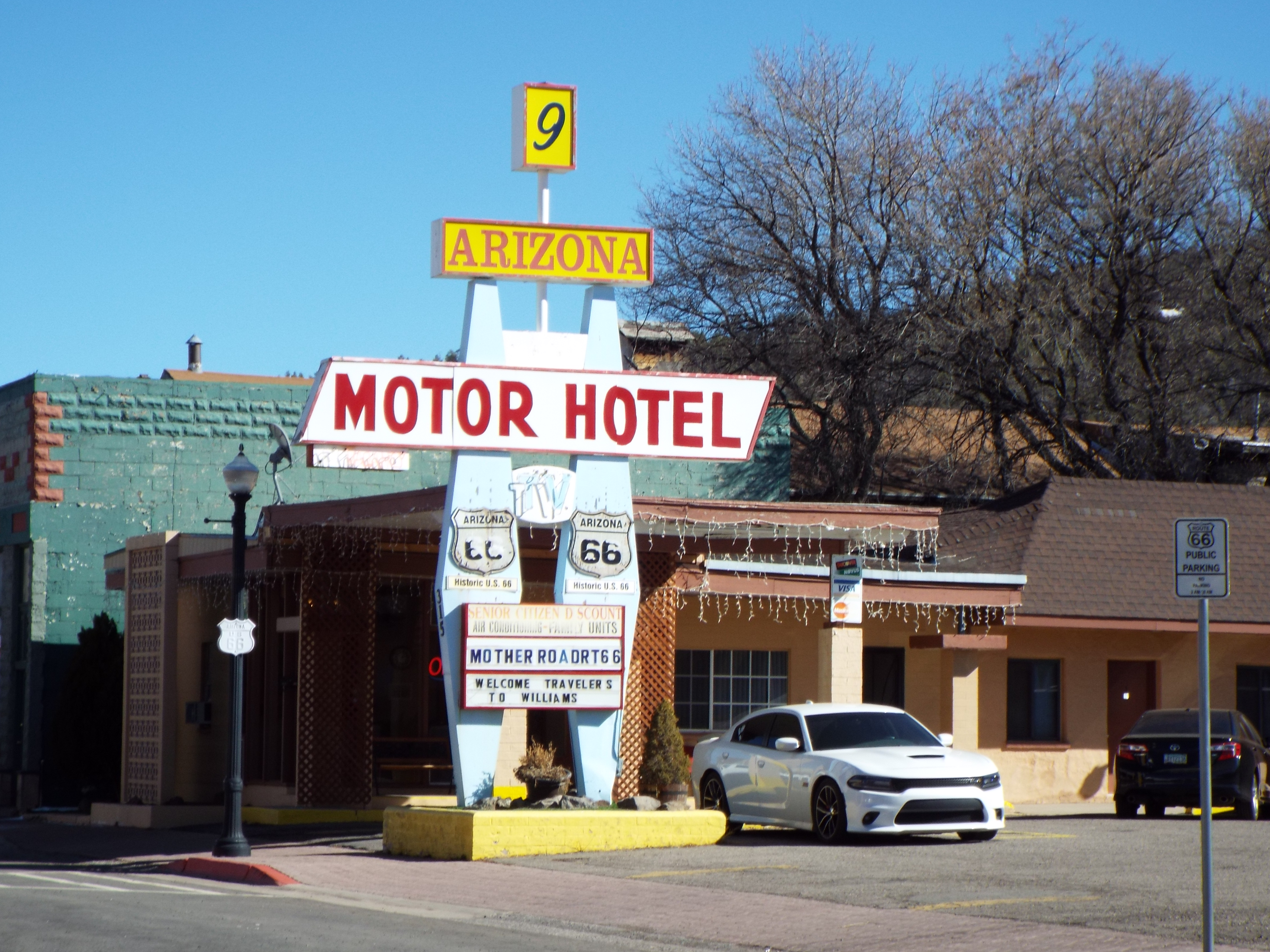
The 9 Arizona Motor Hotel – 1923

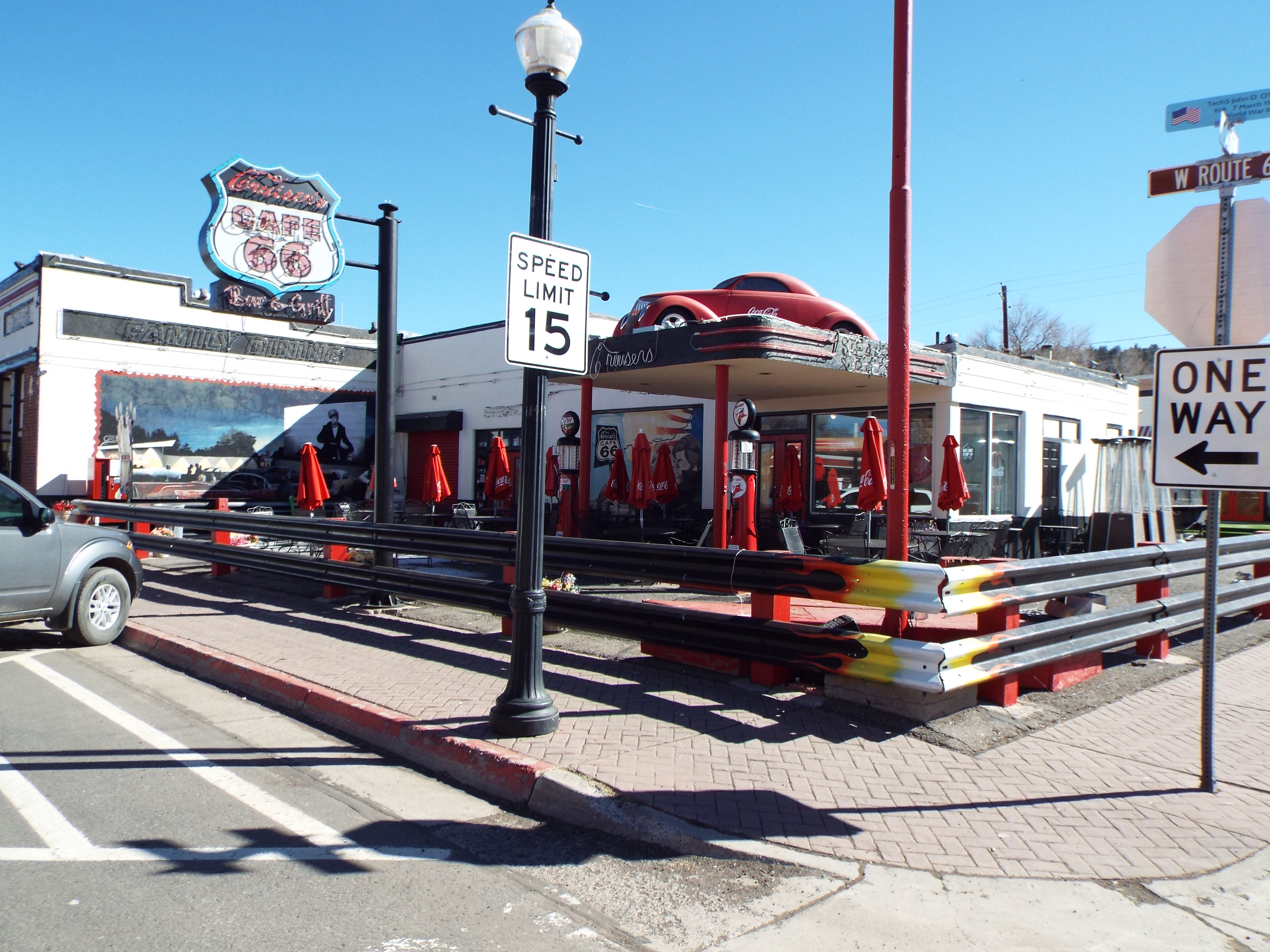
The Old Mobil Gas Station – 1930

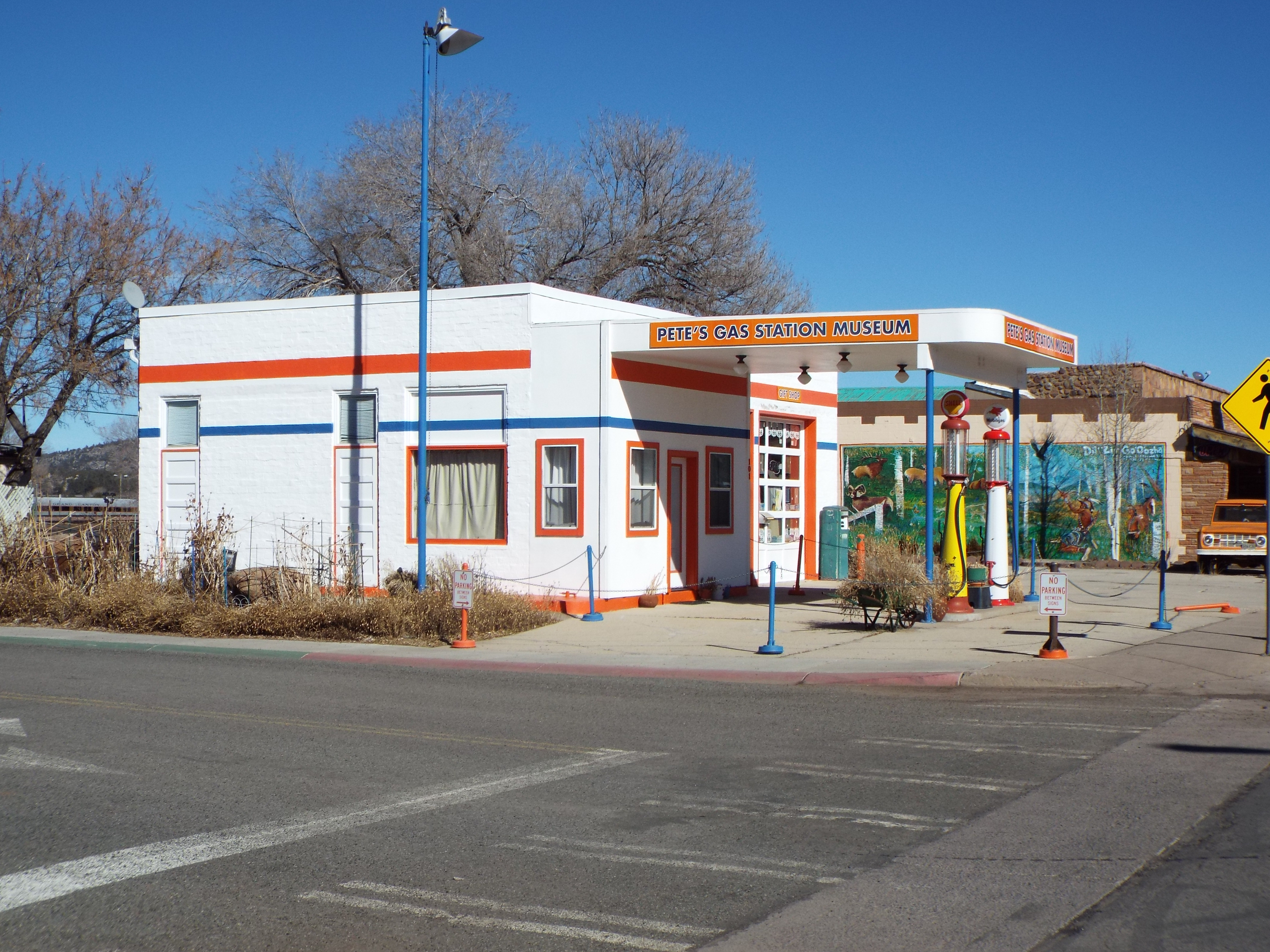
The Pete’s Gas Station Museum – 1949

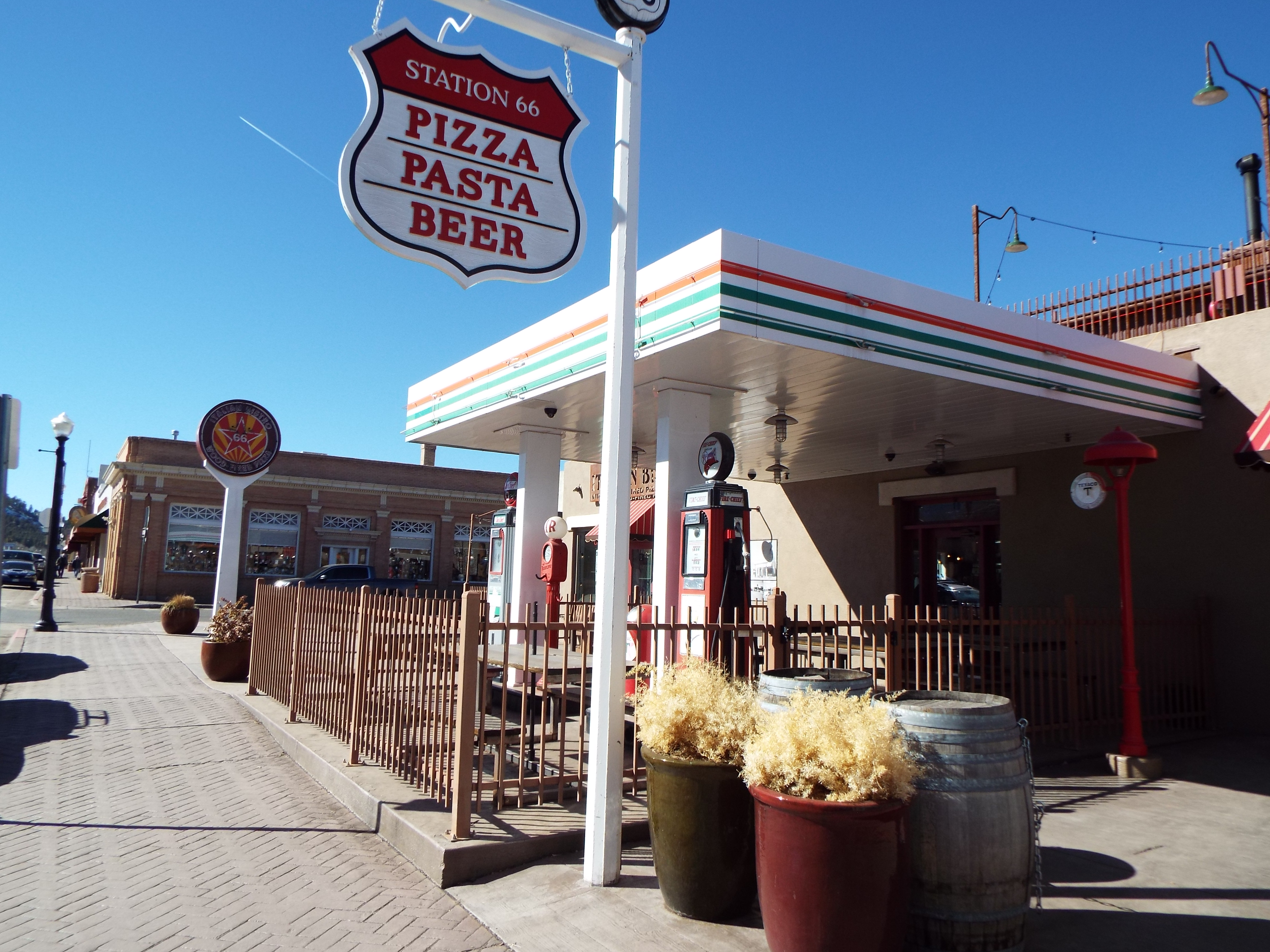
The Old Texaco Gas Station – 1930

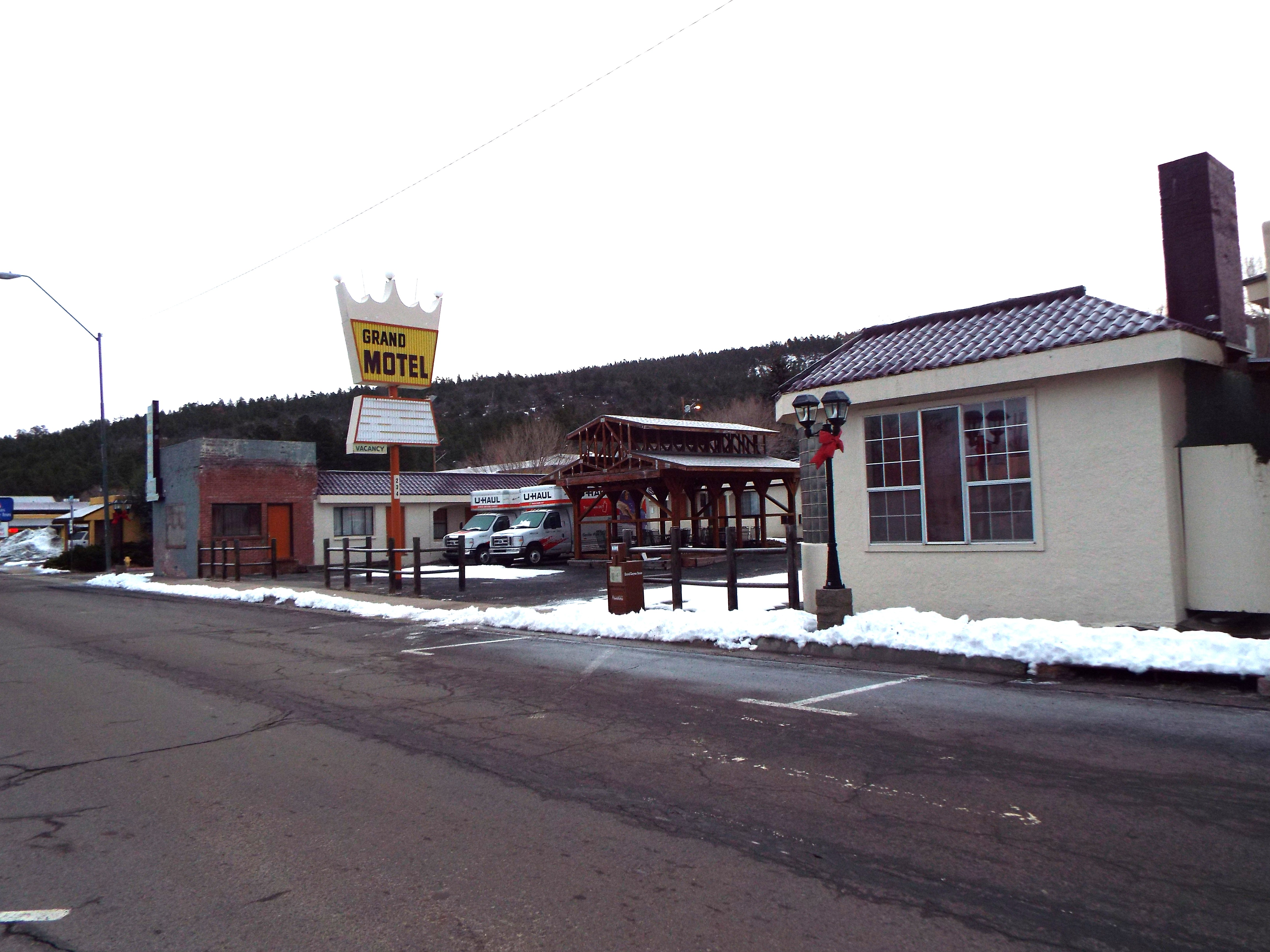
DelSue Motor Inn (now Grand Motel) – 1936

== Williams Residential Historic District ==
The Williams Residential Historic District is bounded by Grant and Fairview Aves. and Taber and 6th Sts. The boundary of the Williams Residential Historic District defines a concentration of late nineteenth and early to middle twentieth century buildings that still retain historic and architectural integrity. All of the buildings relate to residential development that occurred in the Williams Townsite and the Perrin Addition from 1890 to 1941. Some of the houses in the district incorporated a few prefabricated millwork components. The district was added to the National Register of Historic Places on January 8, 1998, reference #97001603. There are two individual properties within the historic district which are solely listed in the NRHP. They are the First Methodist Episcopal Church and Parsonage and the Negrette House.

The following properties are pictured:

- The First Methodist Episcopal Church and Parsonage – (aka Community United Methodist Church) was built in 1891 and is located at 127 W. Sherman Ave. The church was listed in the National Register of Historic Places on November 29, 1984, reference #84000403.
- The American Legion Clubhouse – built in 1936 and located at 425 W. Grant Ave.
- The C.E. Boyce House – built in 1890 and located at 133 W. Grant Ave. Cormick E. Boyce has been credited with being the pioneer merchant of Williams. He came to the Williams area in 1881. By the middle of the 1880s Boyce had already acquired considerable real estate in Williams. In the early 1890s Boyce's two-story brick Grand Canyon Hotel (WMB-41, 1892) was erected. It opened its doors to the public in January, 1892, as the Boyce Hotel.
- The Henry Cone House – built in 1892 and located at 341 W. Sherman Ave.
- The John Keck House – built in 1891 and located at 101 W. Sherman Ave.
- The Michael Shelley House – built in 1891 and located at 228 S. 2nd Street.
- The Negrette House – The Saginaw Mill built house in 1893, which is located at 160 E. 6th Street, as a bunk house and office. In 1919, the Negrette family bought the house for $810. The house was listed in the National Register of Historic Places on October 8, 2014, reference #14000823.
Williams Residential Historic District

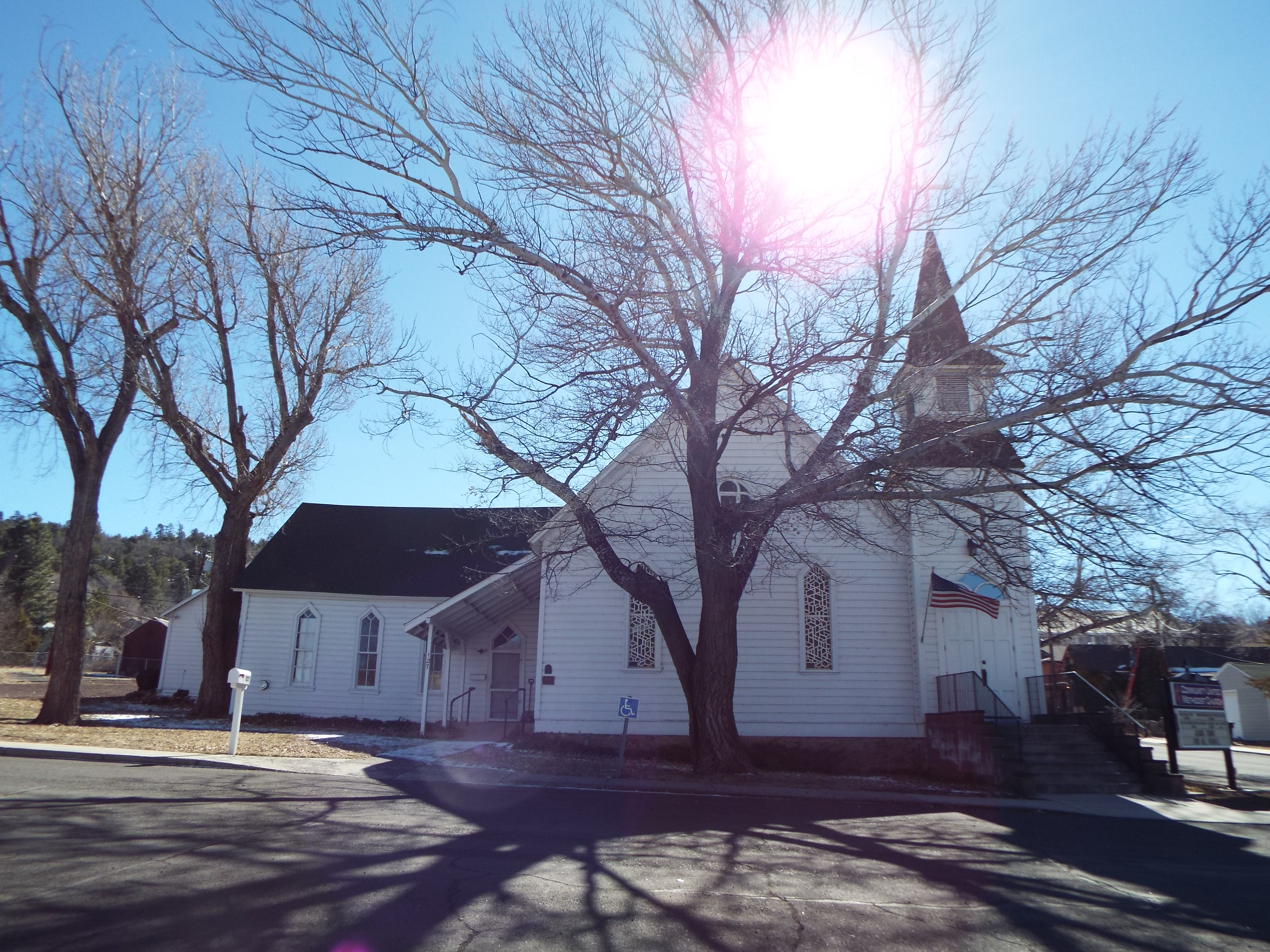
First Methodist Episcopal Church and Parsonage (1891)

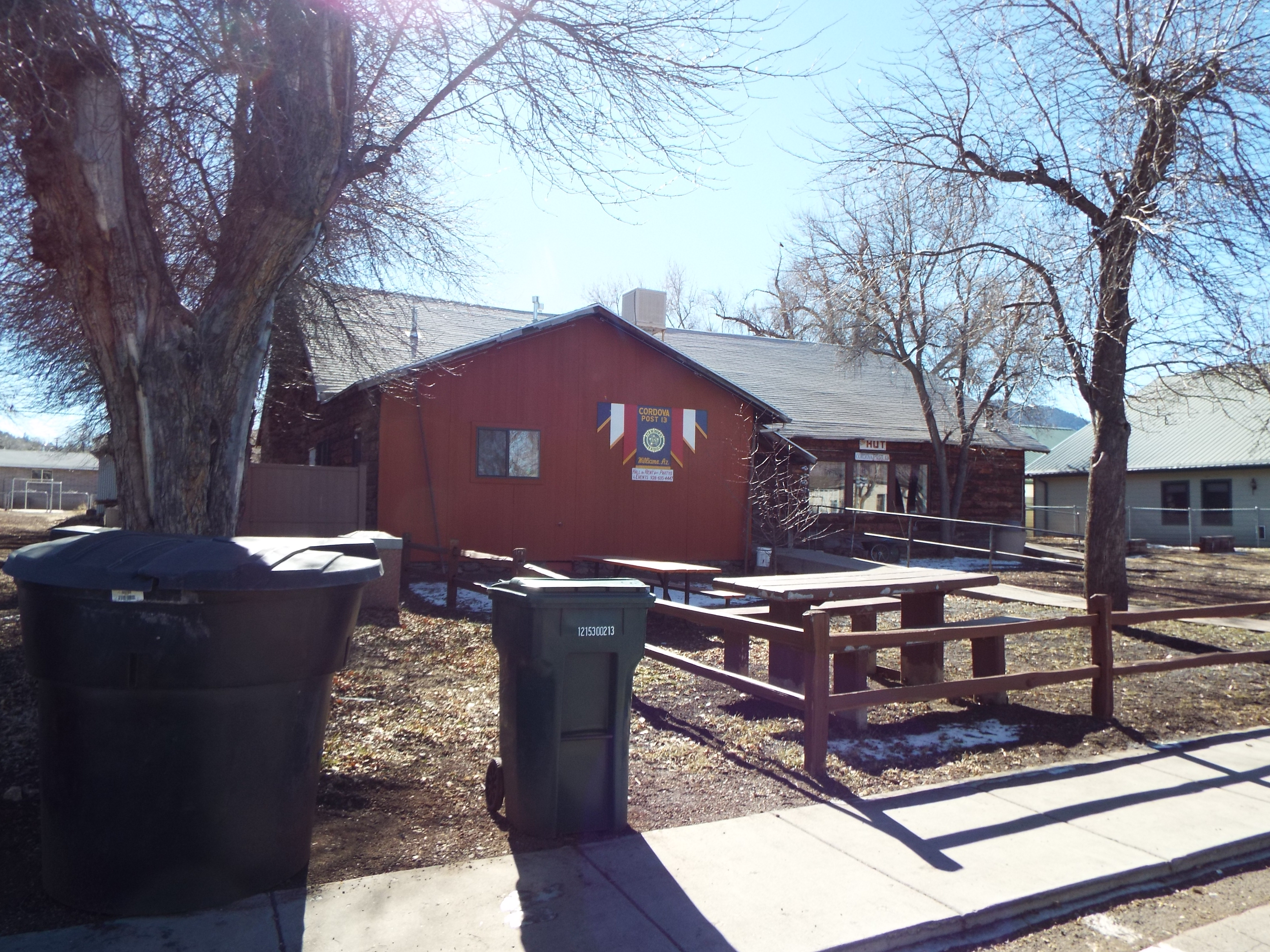
The American Legion Clubhouse – 1936

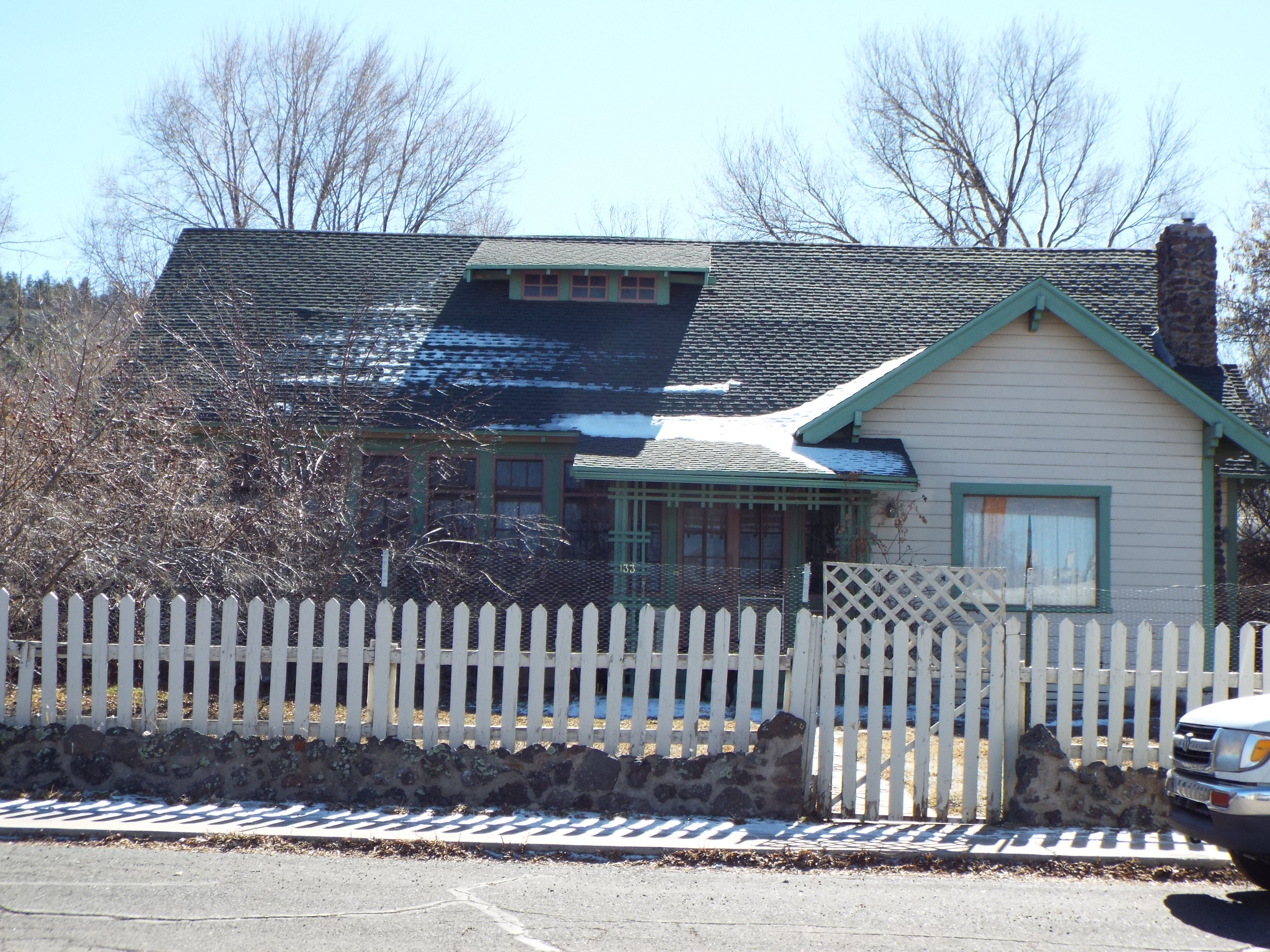
The C.E. Boyce House – 1890

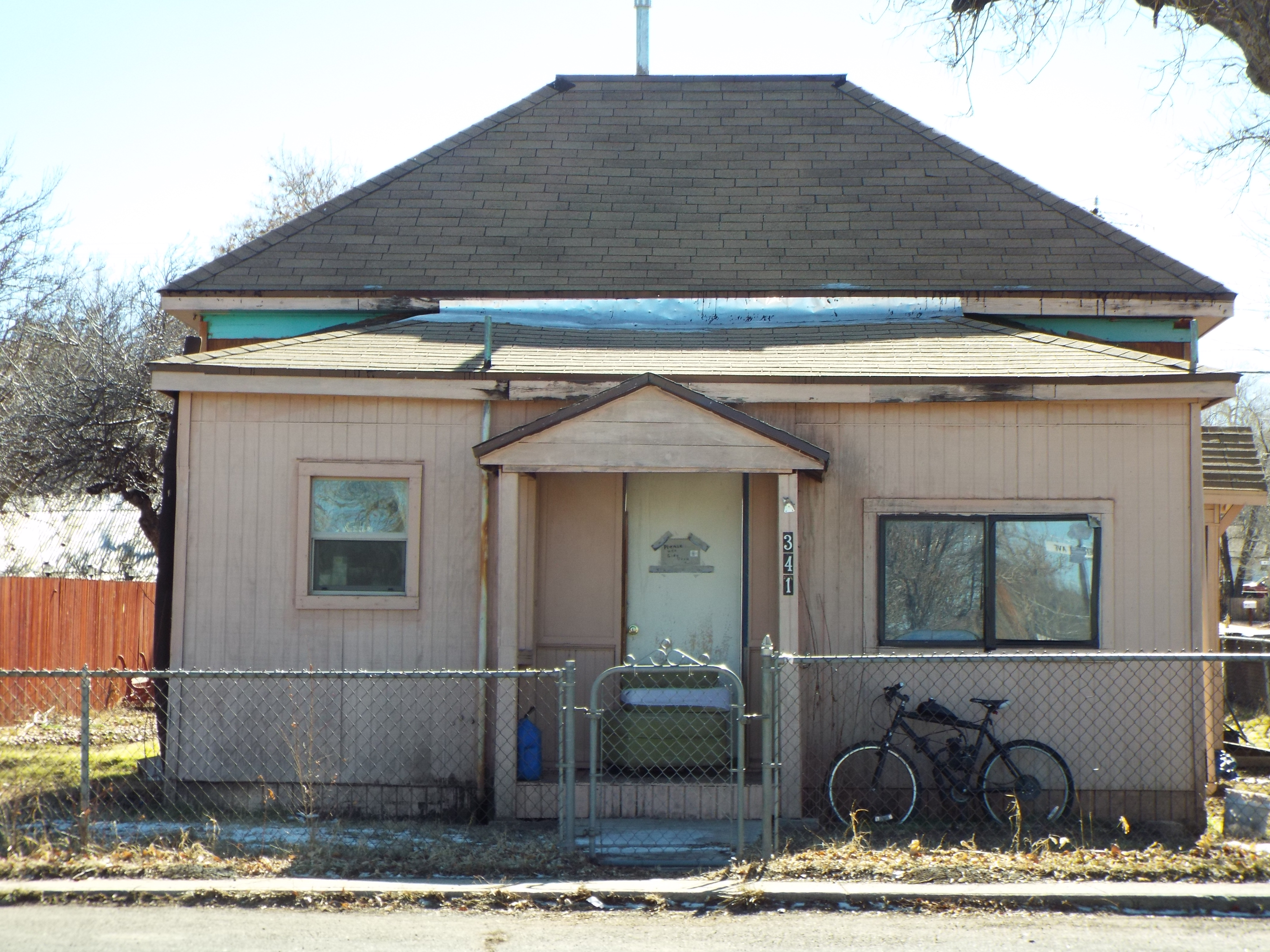
The Henry Cone House – 1892

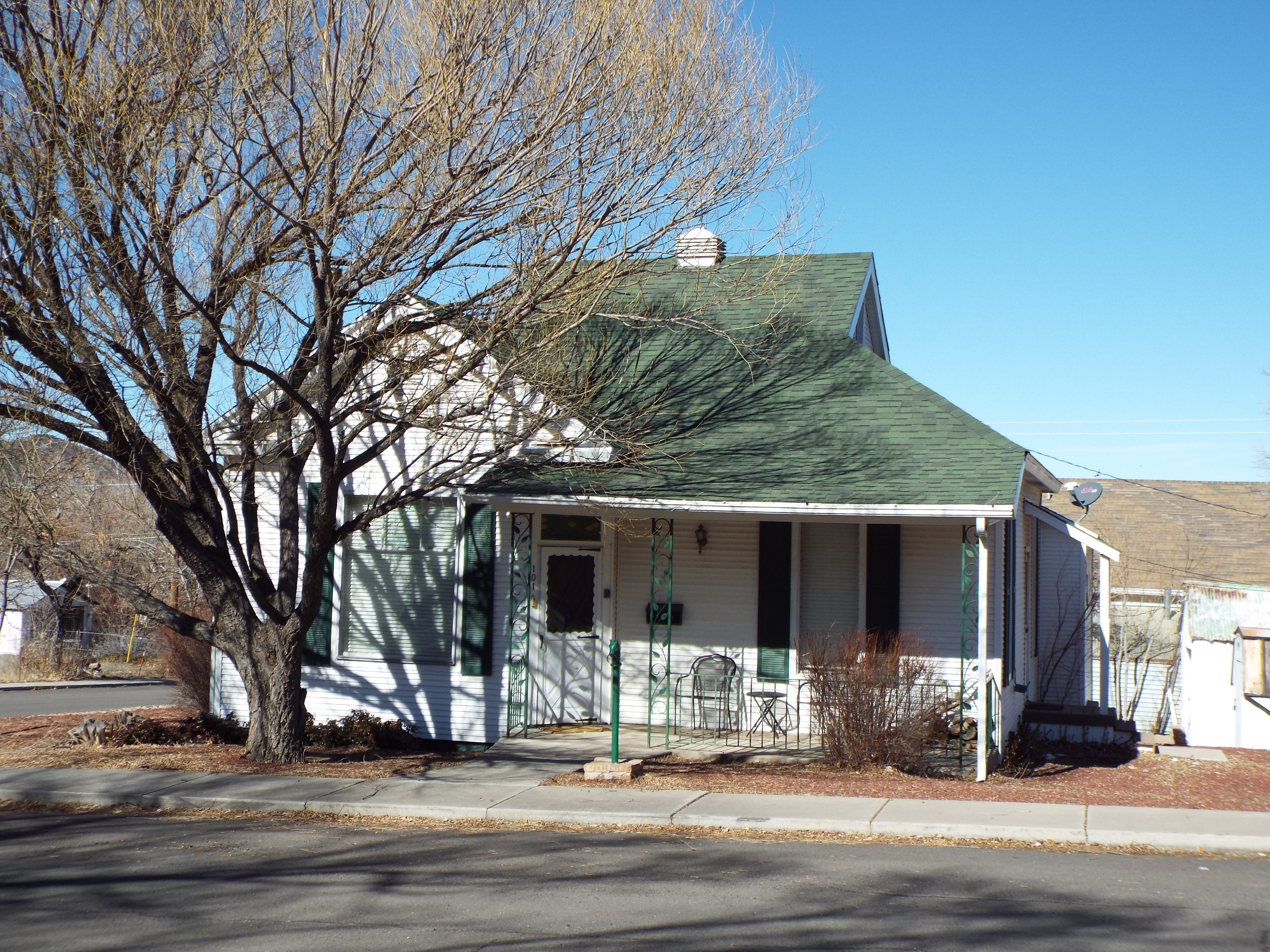
The John Keck House – 1891

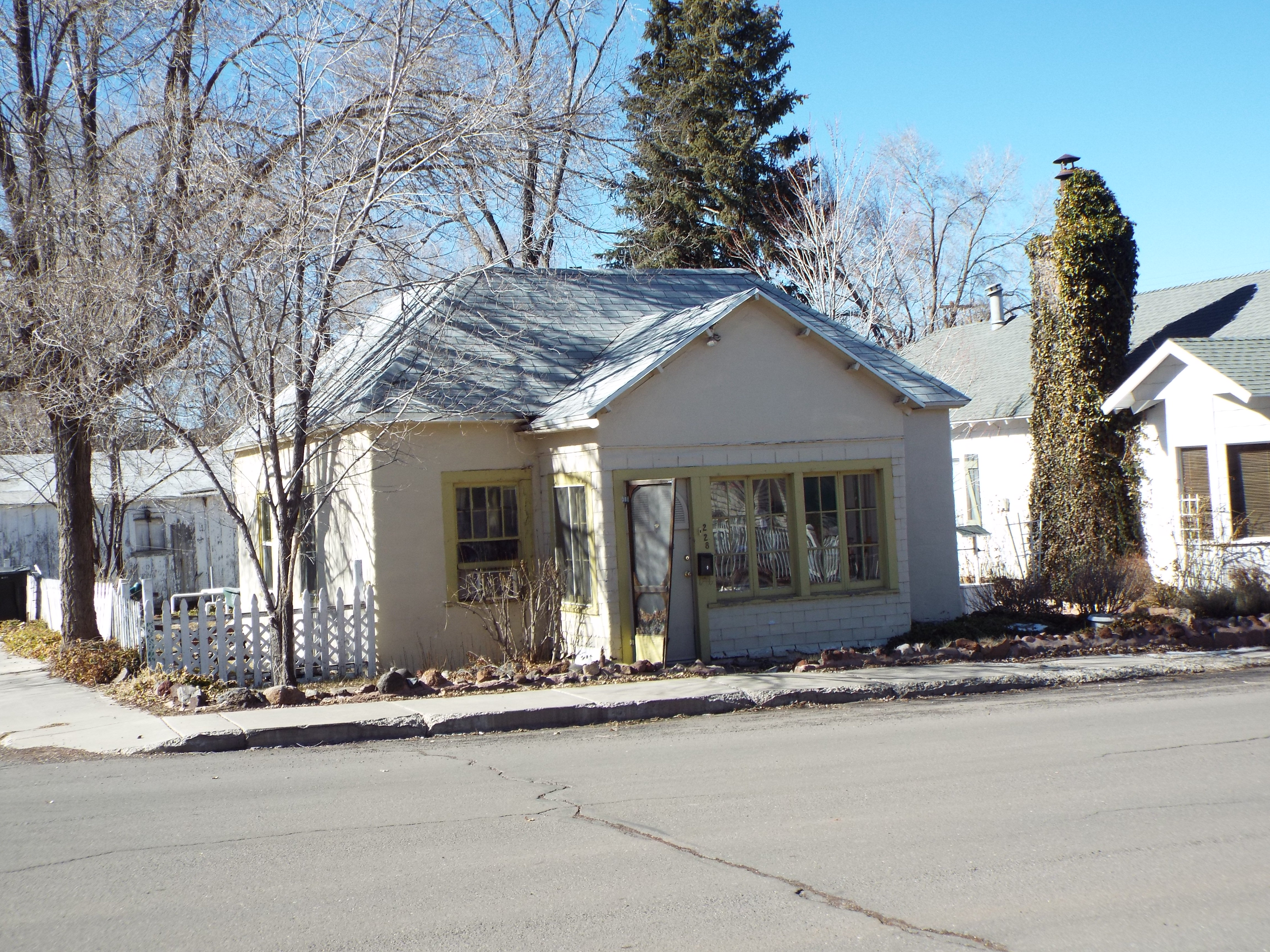
The Michael Shelley House – 1891

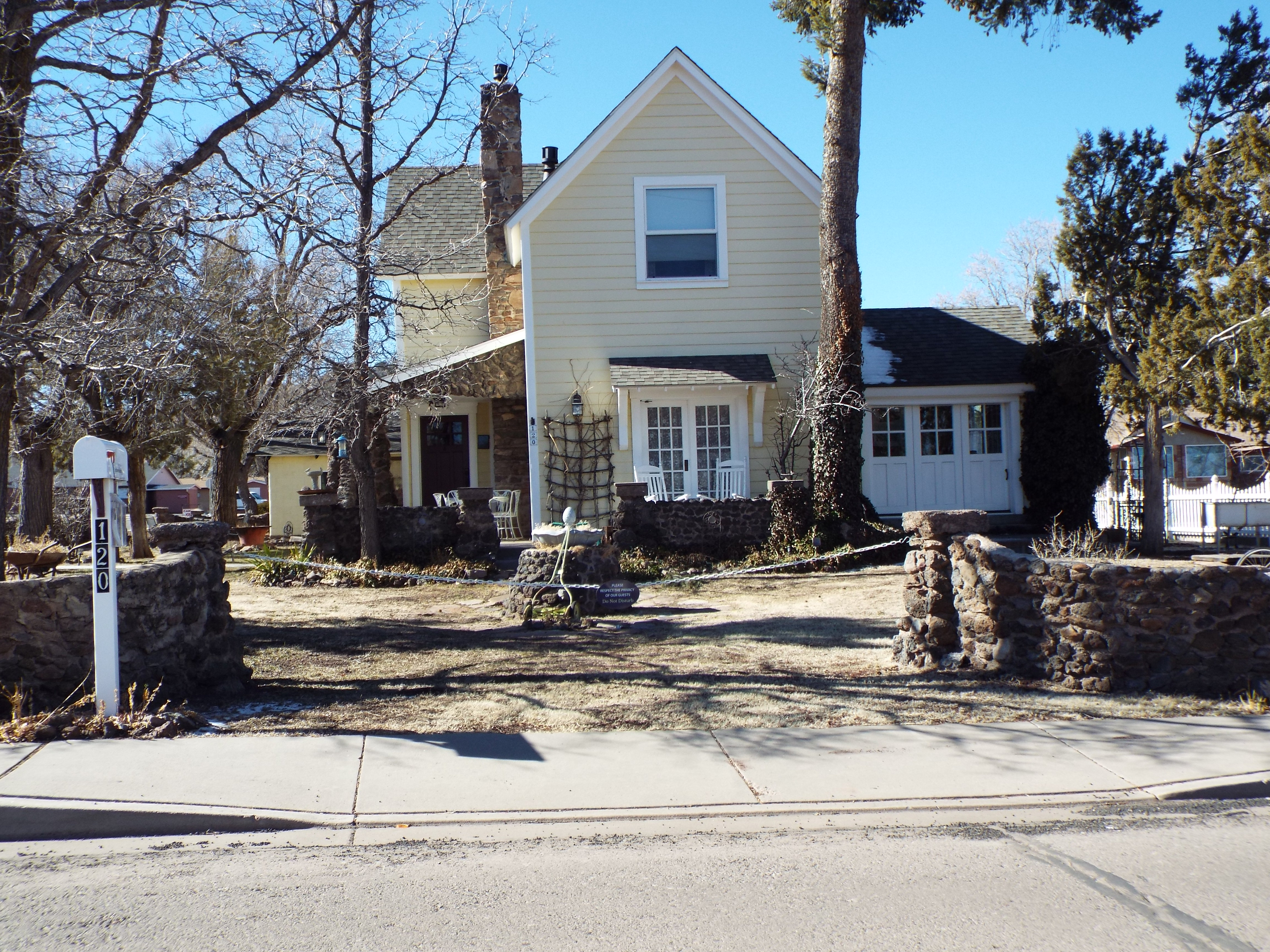
The Negrette House – 1893

== Grand Canyon Railway ==
The Grand Canyon Railway began its operation in 1901, taking passengers from Williams to the Grand Canyon Village. The train with its restored rail cars passes through the countryside of Arizona during its trip. The following images are related to the Grand Canyon Railway.

- The Grand Canyon Railway – a heritage railroad which carries passengers between Williams and the South Rim of Grand Canyon National Park. The railway was listed in the National Register of Historic Places on August 23, 2000, reference #00000319. Pictured is the Grand Canyon Railway Locomotive No. 539 which was built in 1917 and is located at 235 N. Grand Canyon Blvd.
- The Williams Santa Fe Depot – built in 1898 and located at 235 N. Grand Canyon Blvd. It is included in the Nation Register of Historic Places listing of the Grand Canyon Railway.
- The Fray Marcos Hotel – built in 1901 and is located at 235 N. Grand Canyon Blvd. The Fray Marcos Hotel is one of the most historically significant buildings in the District, because of its long term status as "Harvey House". It is also included in the Nation Register of Historic Places listing of the Grand Canyon Railway.
- The Williams Santa Fe Freight Depot – (now the Williams & Forest Service Visitor Center) was built in 1901 and is located on the corner of Grand Canyon Blvd. and Railroad Ave.
- The BNSF (formerly Santa Fe Railroad) Overpass – was built in 1957 and is located over Route 66.
Historic Grand Canyon Railway

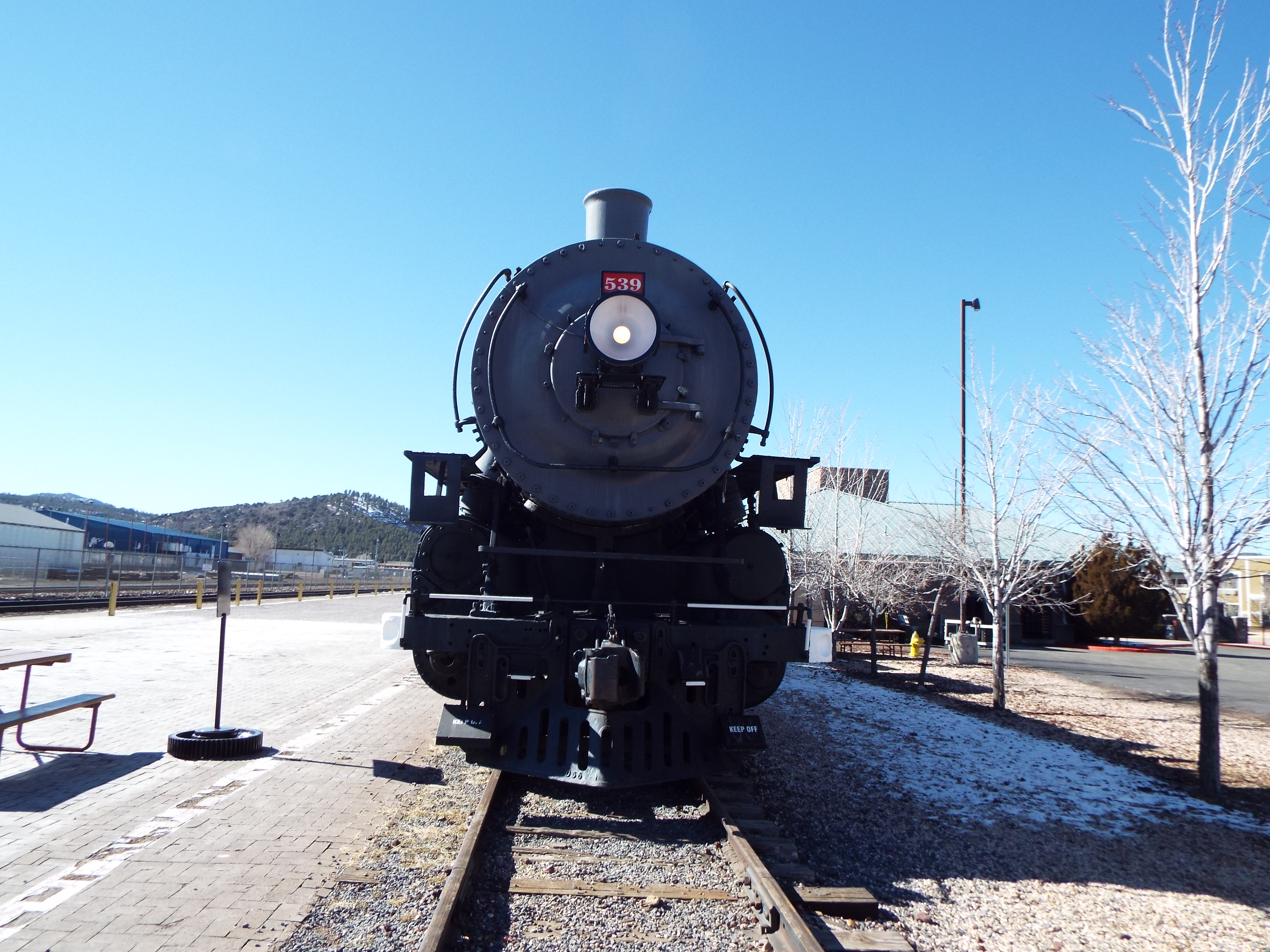
The Grand Canyon Railway Locomotive No. 539 – 1917

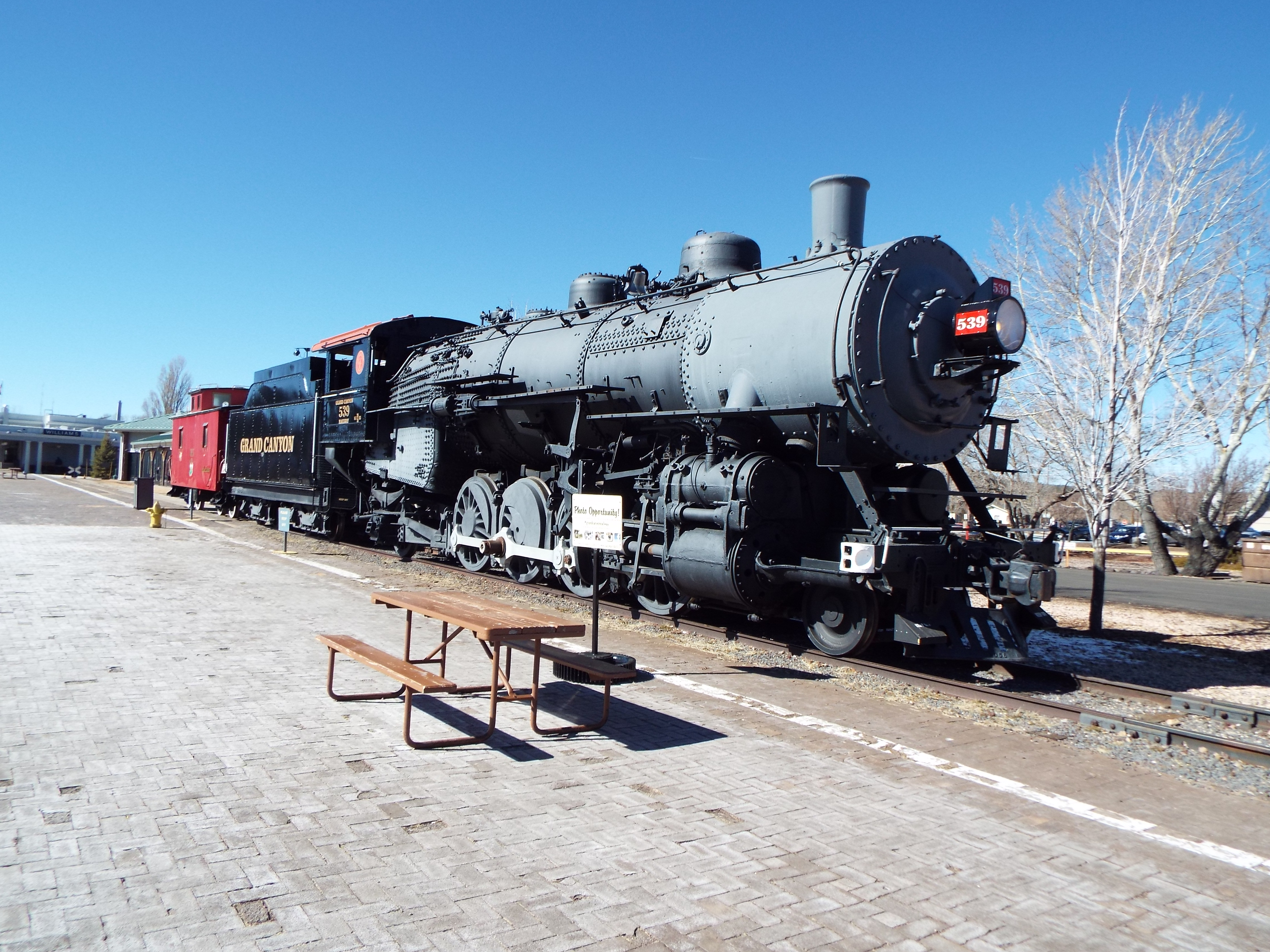
The Grand Canyon Railway – 1901

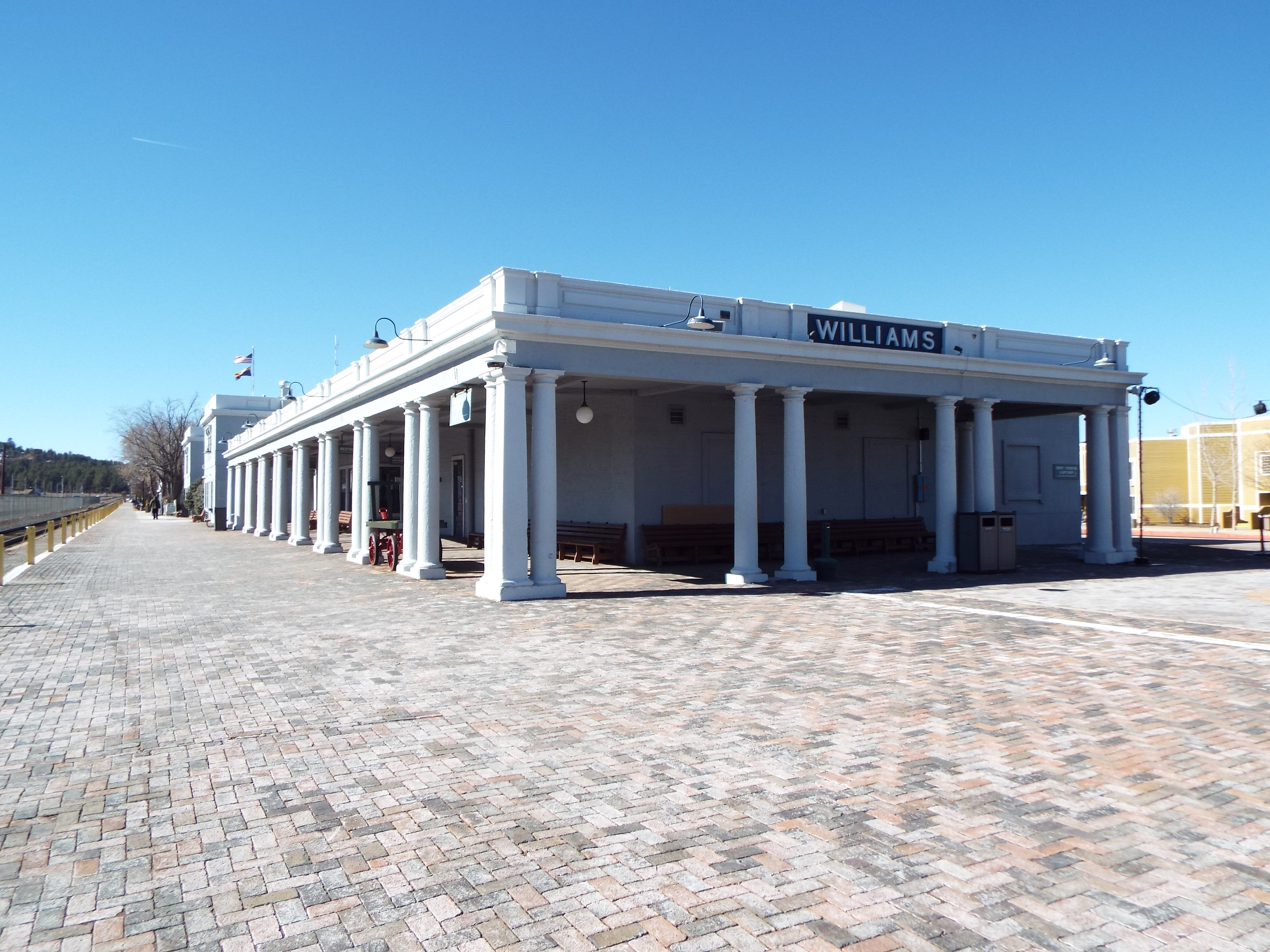
The Williams Santa Fe Depot – 1898

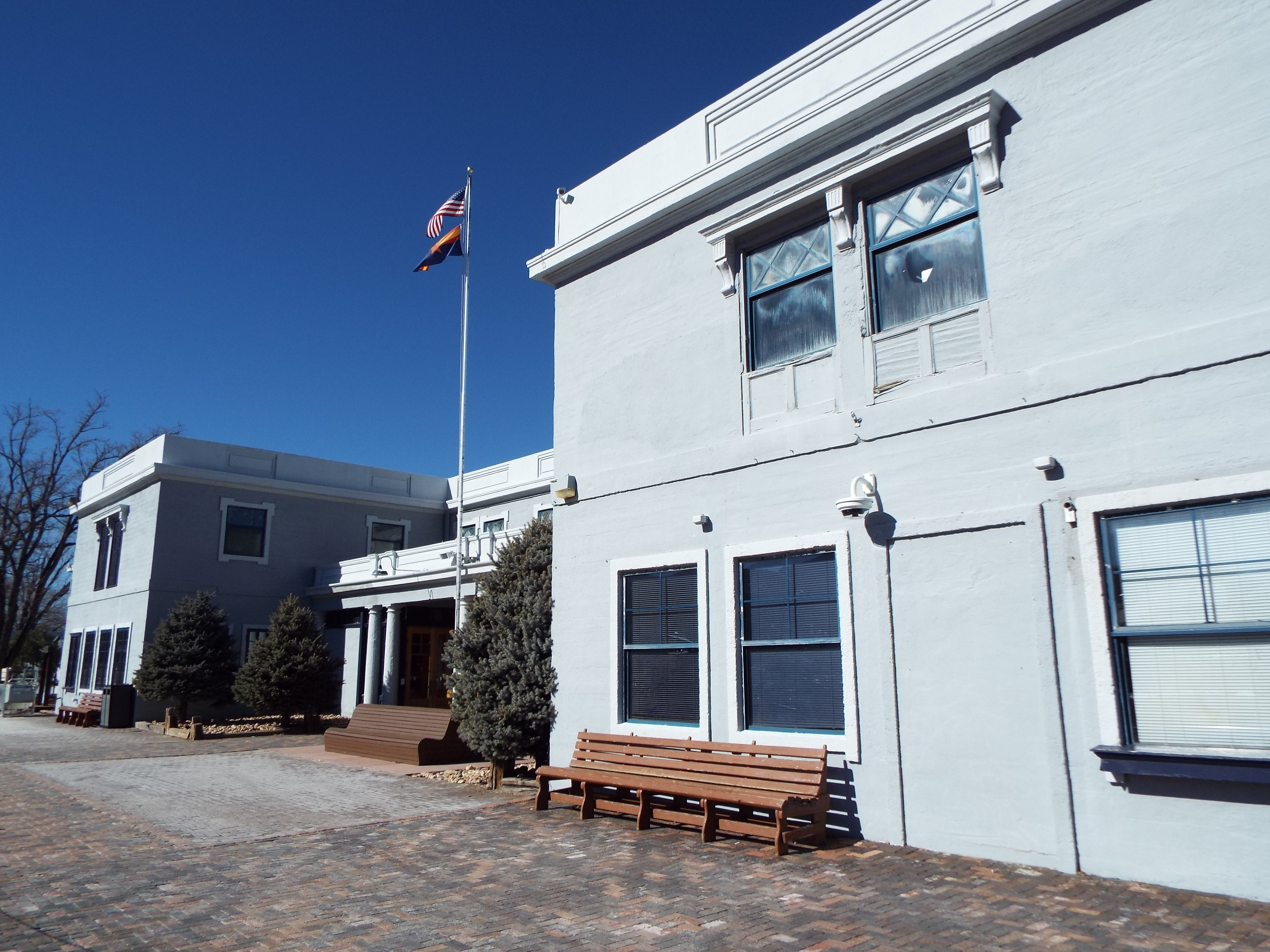
The Fray Marcos Hotel – 1901

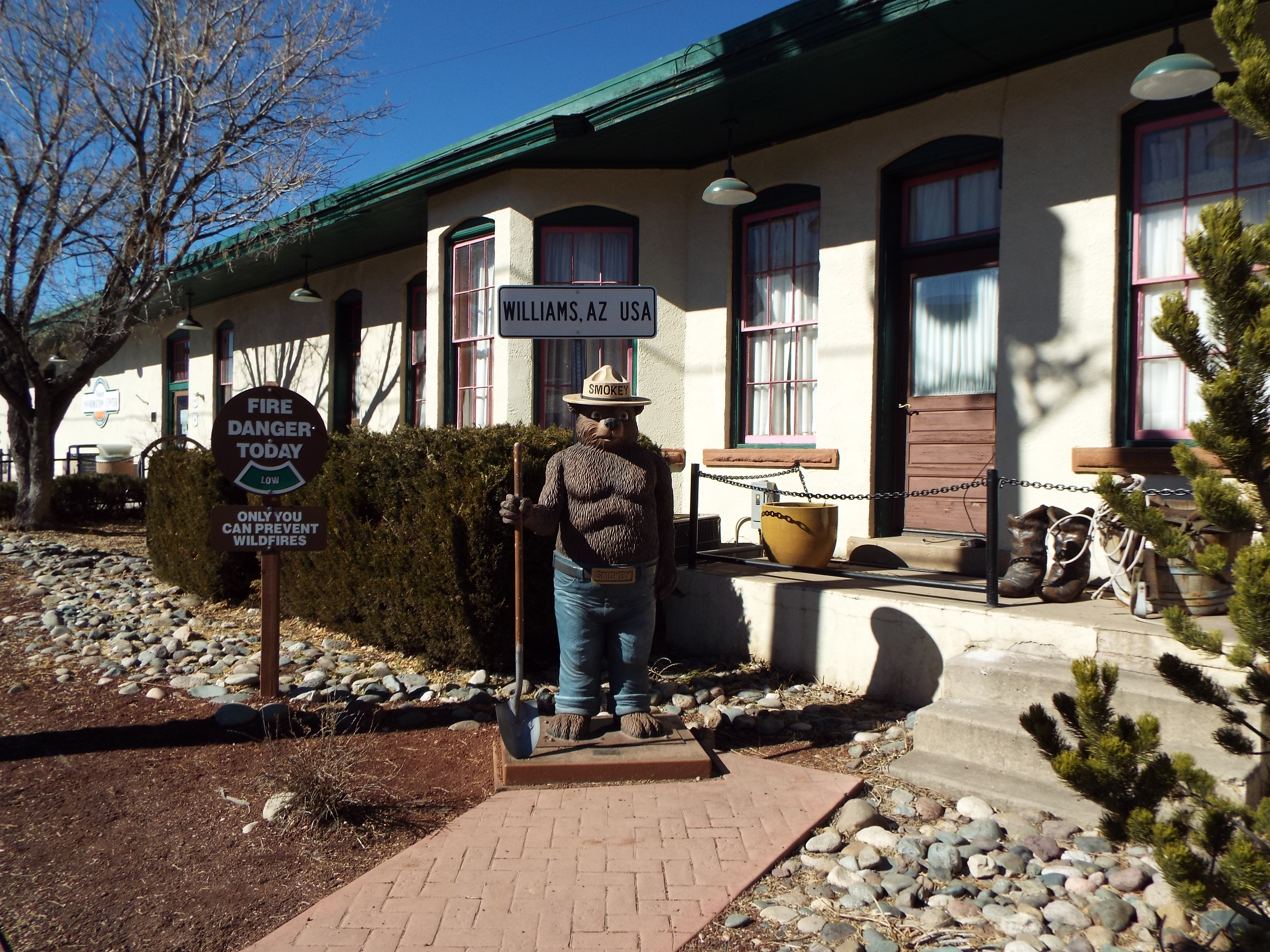
The Williams Santa Fe Freight Depot – 1901

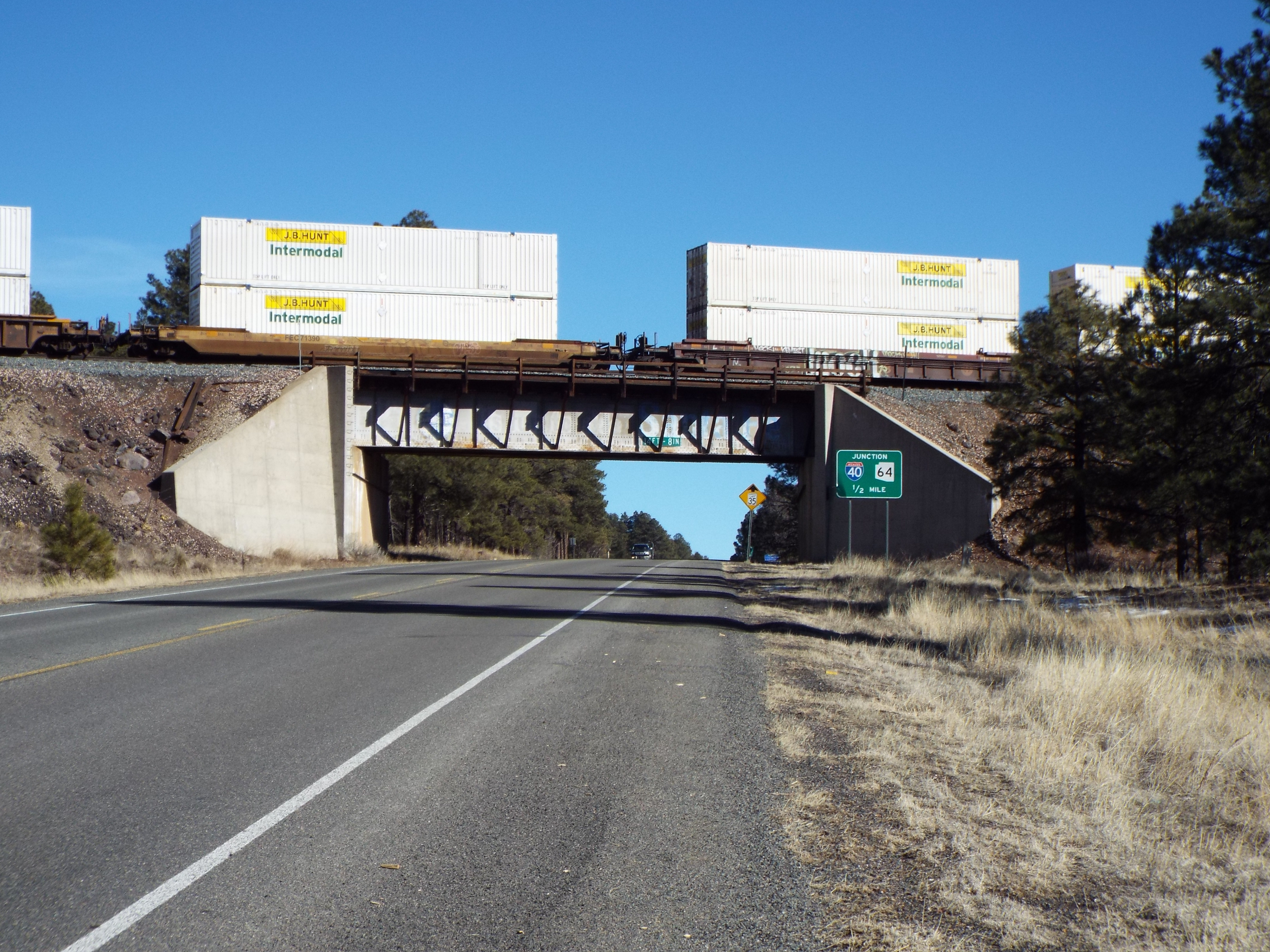
The BNSF (formerly Santa Fe Railroad) Overpass – 1957

== The Williams Ranger District of the Kaibab National Forest ==
The Southern part of the Kaibab National Forest is divided into two districts, the Tusayan Ranger District (offices in the Grand Canyon), and the Williams Ranger District (offices in Williams). Many of these sites were inhabited by the prehistoric "Cohonina". The Williams Region Arizona Site Stewards monitor many of these sensitive sites, helping to report and deter vandalism.

The following places and/or structures are listed in the National Register of Historic Places located within the Williams district of the forest.

- The Barney Flat Historic Railroad Logging Landscape – These are the historic remains of the railroad logging in the South Kaibab Plateau during the early 20th century. Barney Flat is located along Perkinsville Road, south of Williams. It was added to the National Register of Historic Places on February 24, 1995, reference #95000155. It is the only stump field on the National Register of Historic Places.
- The Camp Clover Ranger Station – The listing includes five contributing buildings (an office, a residence, a barn/garage, a shed, and a one-car garage), and one contributing structure (a corral) on 3 acres (1.2 ha) which were built in 1934 by the Civilian Conservation Corps. It was added to the National Register of Historic Places on July 16, 1993, reference #93000520.
- Laws Spring – Law Spring in the William section of the Kaibab National Forest. The area was once inhabited by the "Cohonina" between AD 700 and AD 1100. They left stone houses, pottery sherds, stone tools, grinding stones and rock art across the forest. Many Petroglyphs, also known as prehistoric rock art, have been found in the site of Law Spring. Law Spring was listed in the National Register of Historic Places on July 5, 1984, reference #84000645.
Williams section of the Kaibab National Forest
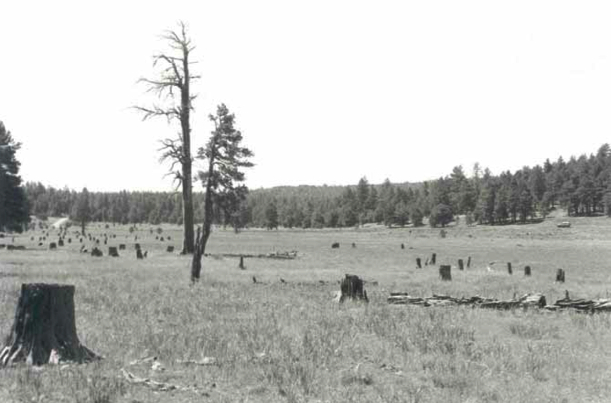
Barney Flat Historic Railroad Logging Landscape.

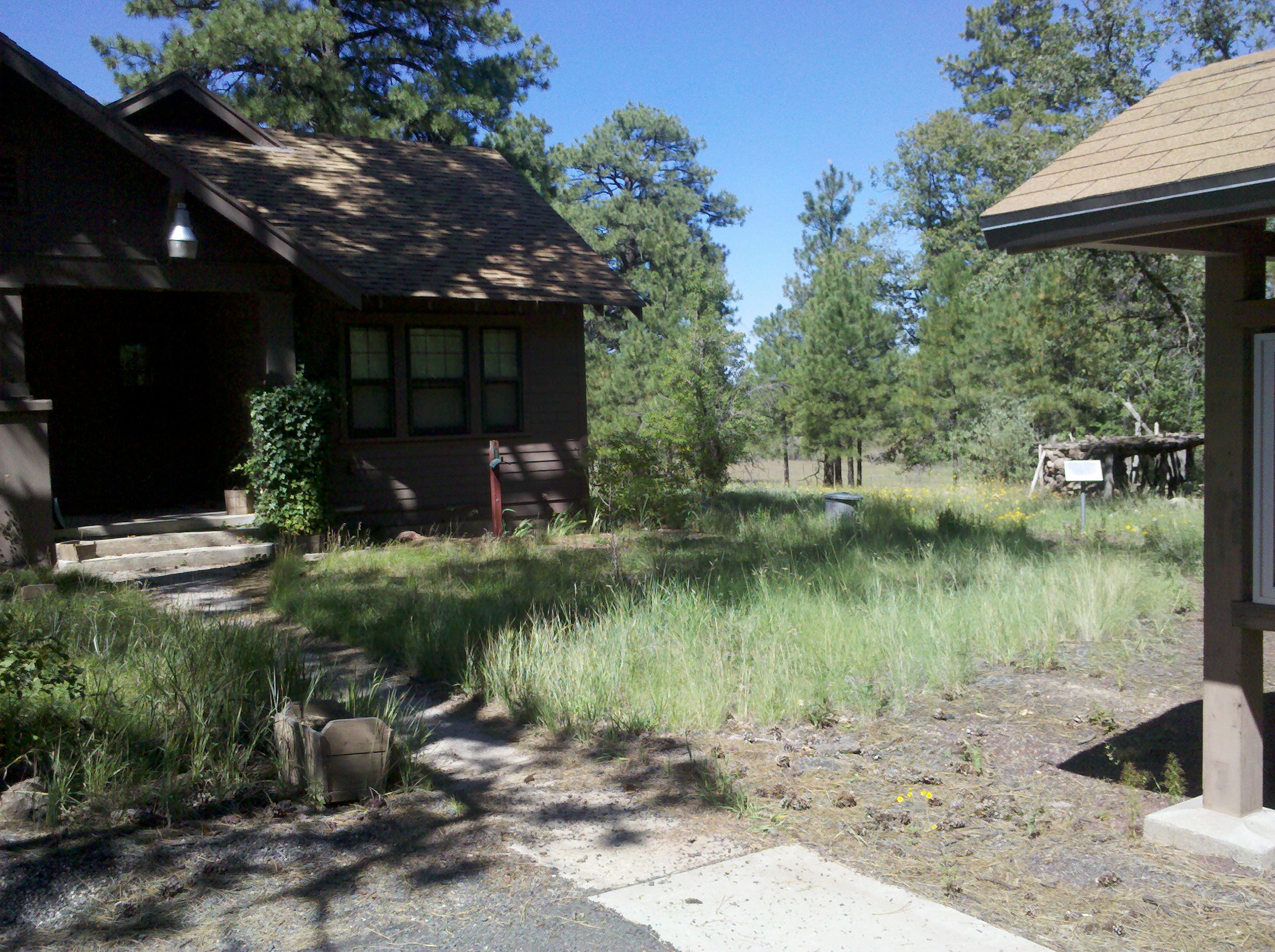
The Camp Clover Ranger Station.

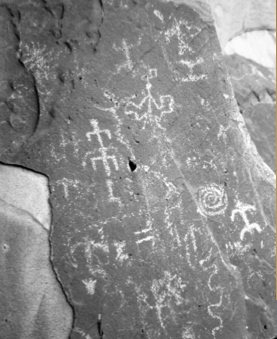
Petroglyph at Laws Spring.

== See also ==
- Kaibab National Forest
- National Register of Historic Places listings in Coconino County, Arizona
