= APBS =

APBS may refer to:

- Aadhaar Payments Bridge System, a payment system in India which uses Aadhaar numbers
- Advanced Poisson-Boltzmann Solver, a continuum electrostatics equations solver
