= Karen Colley =

American glycobiologist

- Education: Duke University; Washington University in St. Louis
- Scientific career
- Fields: Gycobiology
- Workplaces: University of Illinois Chicago

Karen J. Colley is an American glycobiologist and academic administrator serving as the provost of the University of Illinois Chicago since 2023. She is a professor of biochemistry and molecular genetics and the editor-in-chief of Glycobiology.

== Life ==
Colley earned a bachelor's degree in chemistry from Duke University. She completed a Ph.D. in biochemistry from the Washington University in St. Louis. She was a postdoctoral fellow at the University of California, Los Angeles where she researched cell and molecular biology.

In 1991, Colley joined the University of Illinois Chicago as an assistant professor of biochemistry. She was promoted to full professor in 2002. She researches glycobiology. Colley was president of the Society for Glycobiology. Colley was the cofounder of the graduate education in medical sciences program at the University of Illinois College of Medicine. She was later the associate director of the medical scientist training program and the associate dean for graduate research and education at the college of medicine. She served as the interim dean for research and senior associate dean for faculty affairs at the college of medicine. From 2012 to 2022, she was dean of the graduate college and a professor of biochemistry and molecular genetics. During this time she served as the interim dean of the university library from August 2020 to 2021, acting provost from May to August 2021 and June 2022 to June 2023. On July 21, 2023, she became the provost and vice chancellor for academic affairs of the University of Illinois Chicago. Colley is the editor-in-chief of Glycobiology.
