= University of Illinois Chicago =

Public university in Chicago, Illinois, US

- Former names: List: Chicago College of Pharmacy (1859–1894); College of Physicians and Surgeons (1882–1897); Columbian College of Dentistry (1893–1913); University of Illinois Chicago Professional Colleges (1913–1961); University of Illinois at the Medical Center (1961–1982); University of Illinois Chicago Undergraduate Division (1946–1965); University of Illinois at Congress Circle (1965); University of Illinois at Chicago Circle (1965–1982); University of Illinois at Chicago (1982–2021); John Marshall Law School (1899–2019)
- Motto: "Teach, research, serve, care."
- Type: Public research university
- Established: 1913; 113 years ago
- Parent institution: University of Illinois System
- Accreditation: HLC
- Academic affiliations: GCU; URA; USU; Space-grant
- Endowment: $527.9 million (2025)
- Chancellor: Marie Lynn Miranda
- President: Timothy L. Killeen
- Provost: Karen Colley
- Faculty: 2,961 (fall 2022)
- Students: 35,869 (fall 2025)
- Undergraduates: 24,260 (fall 2025)
- Postgraduates: 11,609 (fall 2025)
- Location: Chicago, Illinois, United States; 41°52′18″N 87°38′57″W
- Campus: 244 acres (98.7 ha); Large city
- Other campuses: Moline; Peoria; Rockford; Springfield; Champaign
- Newspaper: Bonfire
- Colors: Blue and red
- Nickname: Flames
- Sporting affiliations: NCAA Division I – MVC; MAC
- Mascot: Sparky
- Website: uic.edu
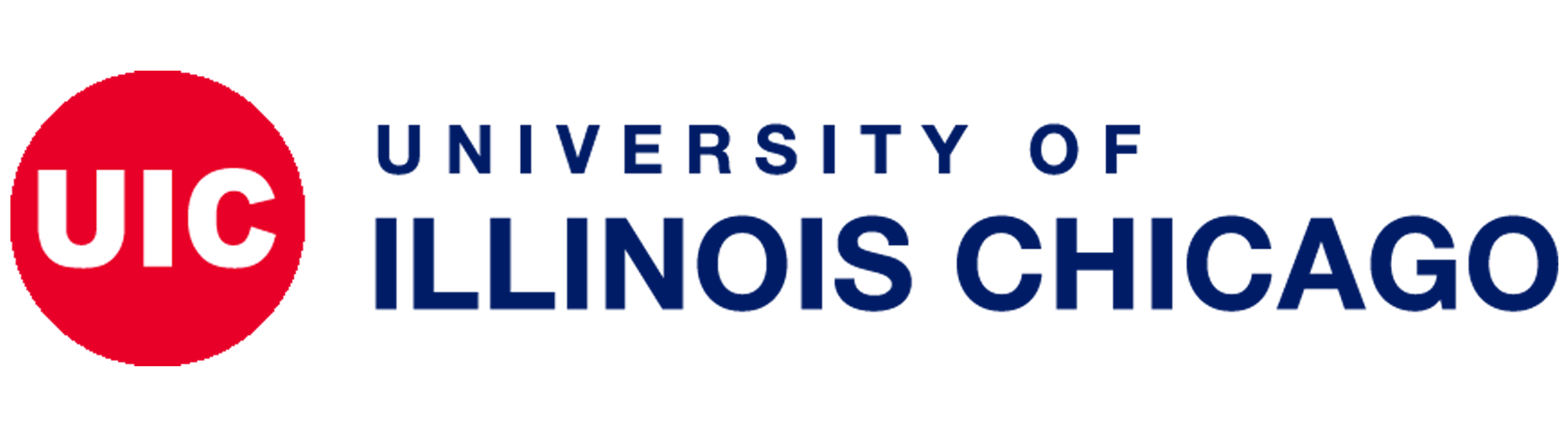

The University of Illinois Chicago (UIC) is a public research university in the Near West Side community area of Chicago, Illinois, United States.

The university was the second institution established within the University of Illinois System and it is now the largest university in the Chicago metropolitan area, having more than 35,000 students enrolled in its 16 colleges. It is classified among "R1: Doctoral Universities – Very high research activity."

== History ==
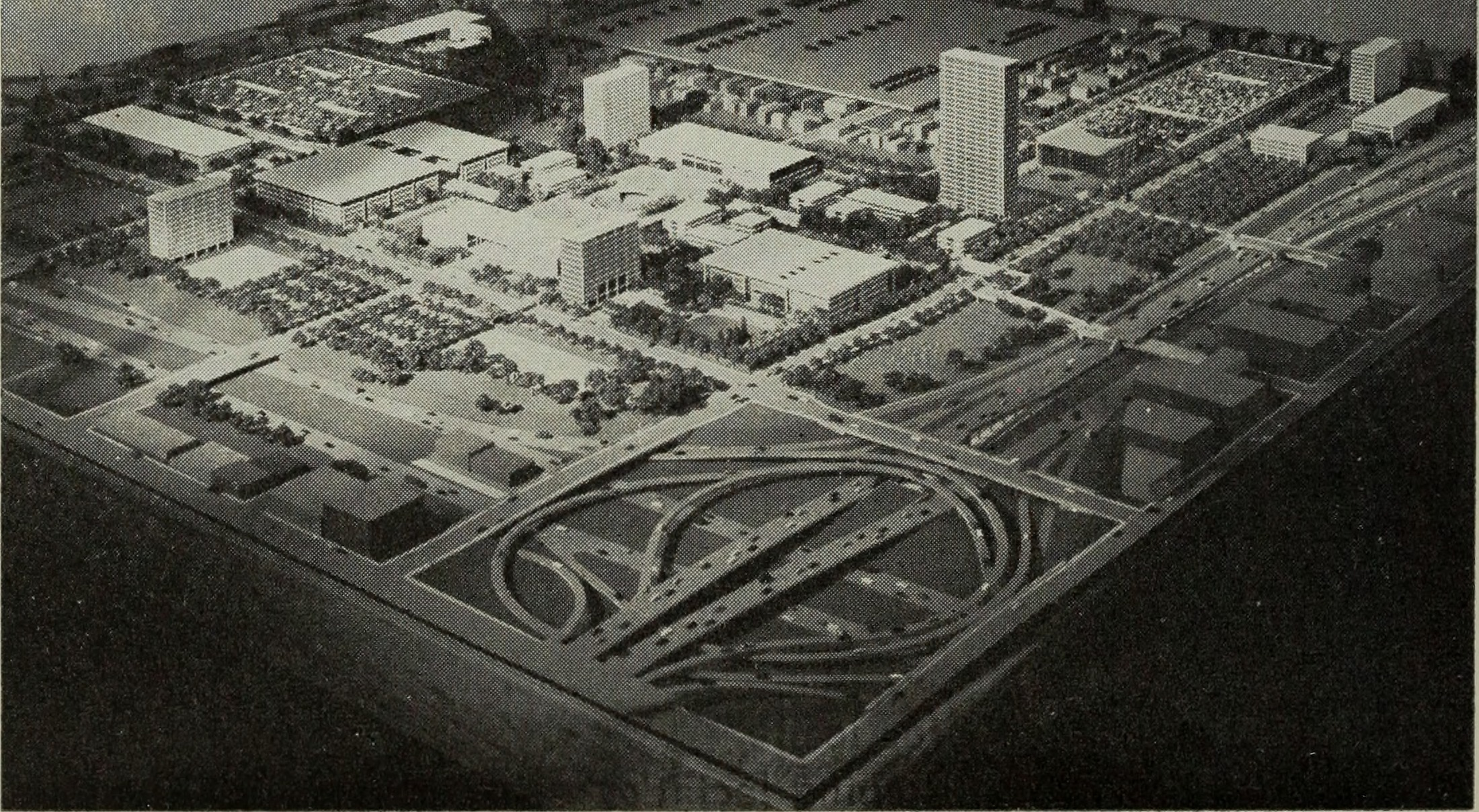
1963 campus model and the Circle Interchange

=== Beginnings ===
The University of Illinois Chicago traces its origins to several health colleges founded during the late 19th century, including the Chicago College of Pharmacy, which opened in 1859, the College of Physicians and Surgeons (1882), and the Columbian College of Dentistry (1893).

The University of Illinois was chartered in 1867 in Champaign-Urbana, as the state's land-grant university. In exchange for agreeing to the Champaign-Urbana location, Chicago-area legislators were promised that a "polytechnical" branch would open in Chicago. The Chicago-based health colleges affiliated with the university in 1896–97, becoming fully incorporated into the University of Illinois in 1913, as the Colleges of Medicine, Dentistry, and Pharmacy on Chicago's west side. Medical education and research expanded in the succeeding decades, leading to the development of several other health science colleges, which were brought together as the University of Illinois Chicago Professional Colleges. In 1936, the first act of newly elected state representative Richard J. Daley was to introduce a resolution calling for the establishment of an undergraduate Chicago campus of the University of Illinois.

=== Navy Pier campus ===
As World War II was drawing to a close, Congress passed the G.I. Bill in 1944, which sought to reward veterans for their military service. Among other benefits, it provided educational funding, making college degrees far more attainable to a much-wider selection of the American public. In 1945, Daley, who was then a state senator, introduced four bills calling for a university in Chicago. In 1946, realizing that they would be "besieged with applications," University of Illinois officials opened what was to be a temporary branch campus called the Chicago Undergraduate Division (CUD) on Navy Pier. The campus was not a junior college, but rather had a curriculum based on Urbana's courses, and students who successfully completed the first two years' requirements could go on to Urbana and finish their degree.

Classes at the CUD campus began in October 1946, and approximately 4,000 students enrolled each semester. Nicknamed "Harvard on the rocks," three-quarters of its students were veterans on the G.I. Bill, many of whom were immigrants and most of whom worked other part-time jobs to support themselves. It also accommodated first-generation college students from working families who commuted from home. (Navy Pier's Undergraduate Division makes an appearance in Robert Pirsig's Zen and the Art of Motorcycle Maintenance; its protagonist taught freshman English there.)

Due to high demand for a public university education in Chicago, the university made plans to create a permanent degree-granting campus in Chicago. Students at CUD generally needed to transfer after two years to a more expensive private college in Chicago, (Note: At the time, the only 4-year graduating public college in Chicago was a teacher's college.) or go to the main campus in Champaign–Urbana, where there were fewer opportunities for work, while at the same time as going to school.

=== Congress Circle campus ===
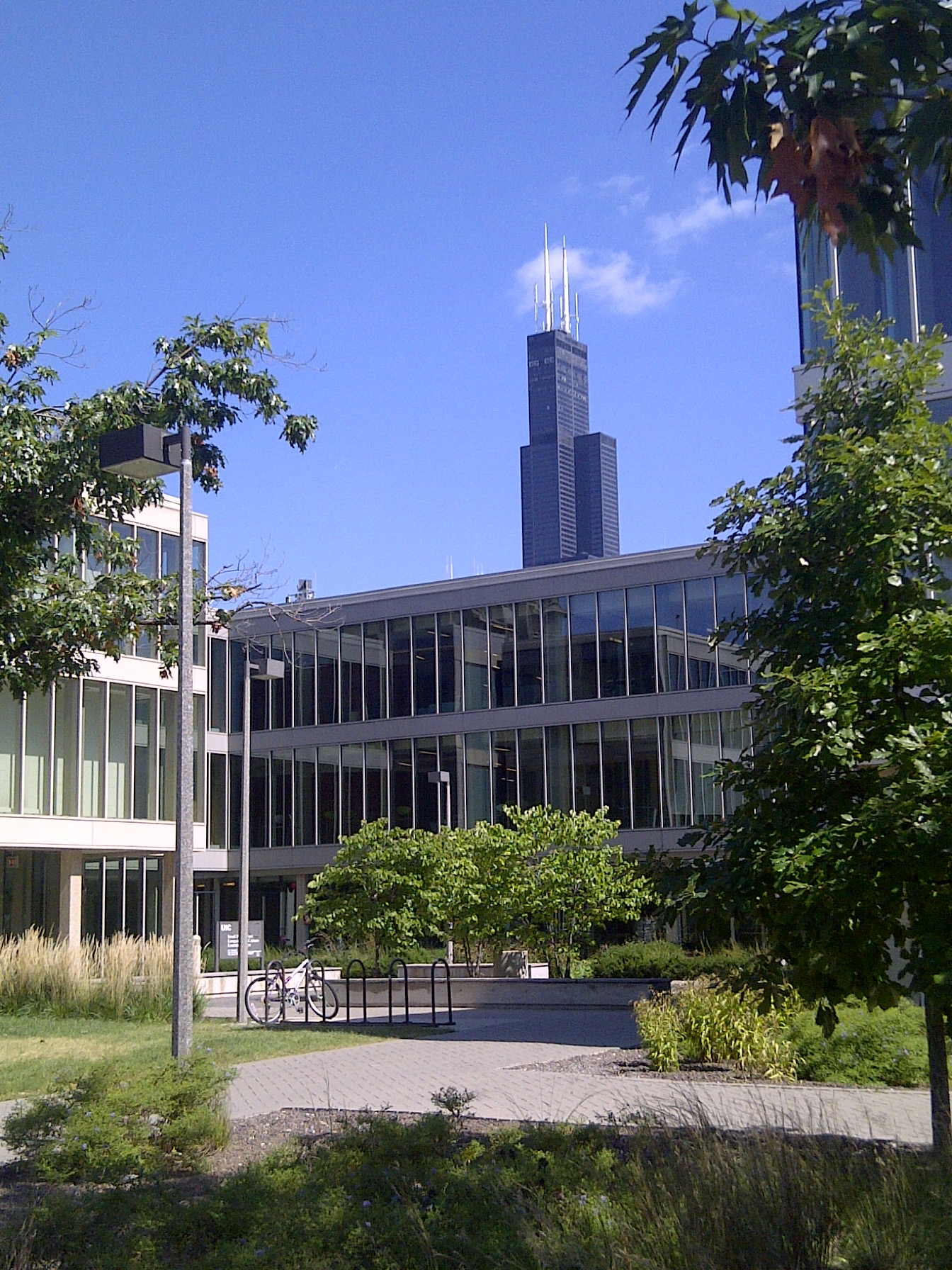
UIC's campus

Daley succeeded in getting the state senate in 1951 to pass a bill calling for a Chicago campus. Daley then became mayor of Chicago in 1955 and pressed the University of Illinois to upgrade the Chicago Undergraduate Center to a full-fledged four-year institution. After a long and controversial site decision process, in 1961, Mayor Daley offered the Harrison and Halsted Streets site for the new campus. In December 1961, the final decision to establish a four-year university in Chicago was made. In that same year, the Chicago Professional Colleges became the University of Illinois at the Medical Center (UIMC).

Florence Scala led the fight against Mayor Richard J. Daley's plan to demolish her Italian-American neighborhood to construct the campus. In 1963, the trustees of Hull House accepted an offer of $875,000 for the settlement building. Jessie Binford and Scala took the case to the Supreme Court. Scala led marches to protest the construction. The U.S. Supreme Court declined to consider an appeal and the settlement was closed on March 28, 1963. During the construction of the 100-acre (0.40 km^{2}) UIC campus, 200 businesses and 800 homes were bulldozed in Little Italy, with 5,000 residents displaced.

In 1963, construction began on the university's new Chicago campus at Harrison and Halsted Streets south of the Greektown neighborhood. In February 1965, the new Chicago campus opened and was to be named the University of Illinois at Congress Circle (UICC) referencing the nearby Circle Interchange of I-290 and I-90/I-94). Shortly before opening, the Congress Expressway was renamed the Eisenhower Expressway and the interchange Chicago Circle, so the campus was renamed to University of Illinois at Chicago Circle (UICC). UICC was designed in the brutalist style by Walter Netsch of Skidmore, Owings and Merrill, a Chicago-based architectural firm responsible for many of today's tallest skyscrapers. Unlike the CUD campus, Circle was a degree-granting institution. Within five years of the campus' opening, in addition to undergraduate degrees, virtually every department offered graduate degrees.

=== Consolidation ===
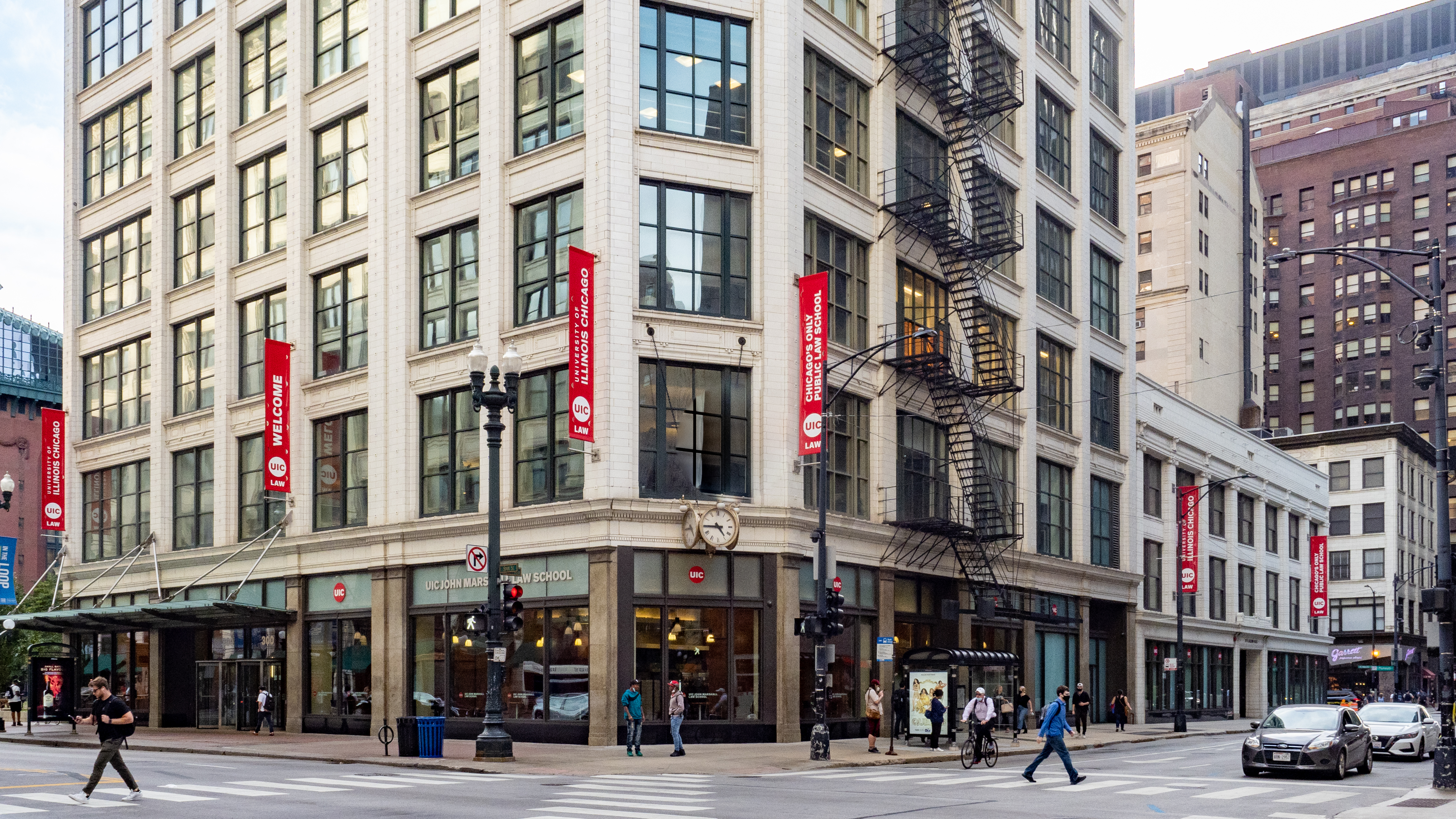
The university absorbed the School of Law in 2019.

In September 1982, the University of Illinois system consolidated UICC and UIMC to form the University of Illinois at Chicago (UIC), later dropping the "at" in 2020 to become University of Illinois Chicago.

In 2000, UIC began developing the south campus. The expansion of UIC south of Roosevelt Road increased on-campus living space and research facilities.

In 2015, UIC conducted its first university-wide winter commencements, adding that as a permanent option going forward.

In 2019, the John Marshall Law School, founded in 1899 and named for the American jurist John Marshall, became affiliated with the university. In 2021, the UI Trustees voted to officially rename UIC John Marshall Law School as UIC School of Law, citing Marshall's "role as a slave trader, slave owner of hundreds of slaves, pro-slavery jurisprudence, and racist views."

== Campus ==
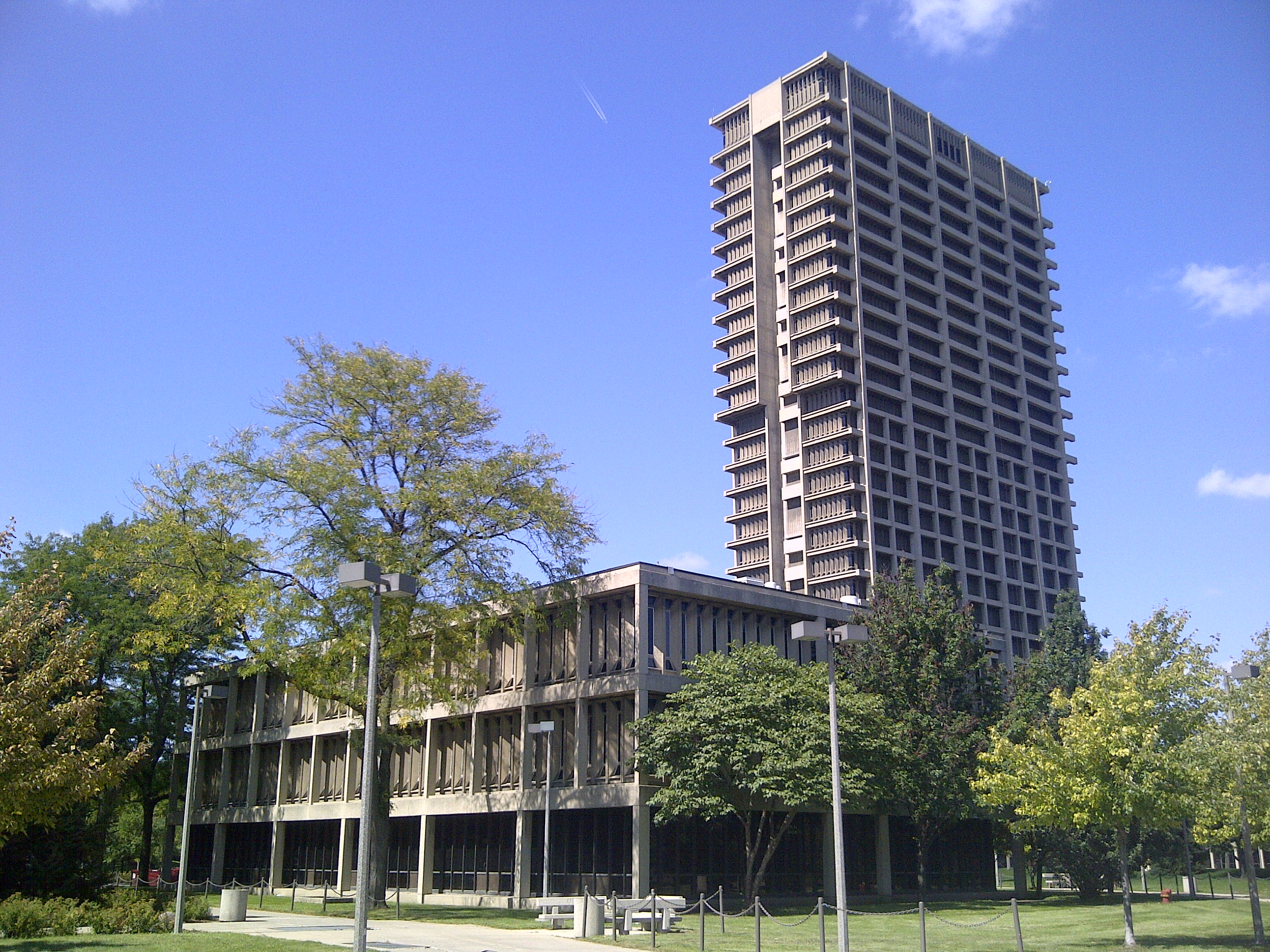
University Hall, located on UIC's East Campus

UIC is Chicago's largest university with more than 33,000 students, 12,000 employees, 16 colleges and the state's major public medical center. The East Campus was designed in the brutalist style by Walter Netsch. The plan included second-story walkways that connected all of the buildings. Some of the later buildings in Netsch's design were not rectilinear (the Behavioral Sciences Building) and even irregularly shaped (Science and Engineering South, and the never-completed Art & Architecture building). These demonstrated his idea of "field theory": designs which used squares and rotations of squares superimposed on one another. While the buildings are largely intact, the walkways were taken down in phases during the early 1990s to make the campus more welcoming. Considerable effort has been expended to modify the original Netsch campus plan to create the feel of a traditional college campus. For example, the area in front of the main administration building, University Hall, has been the site of several renovations in the last decade; and, Credit Union 1 Arena (formerly the UIC Pavilion, a sports arena) was added in 1982.

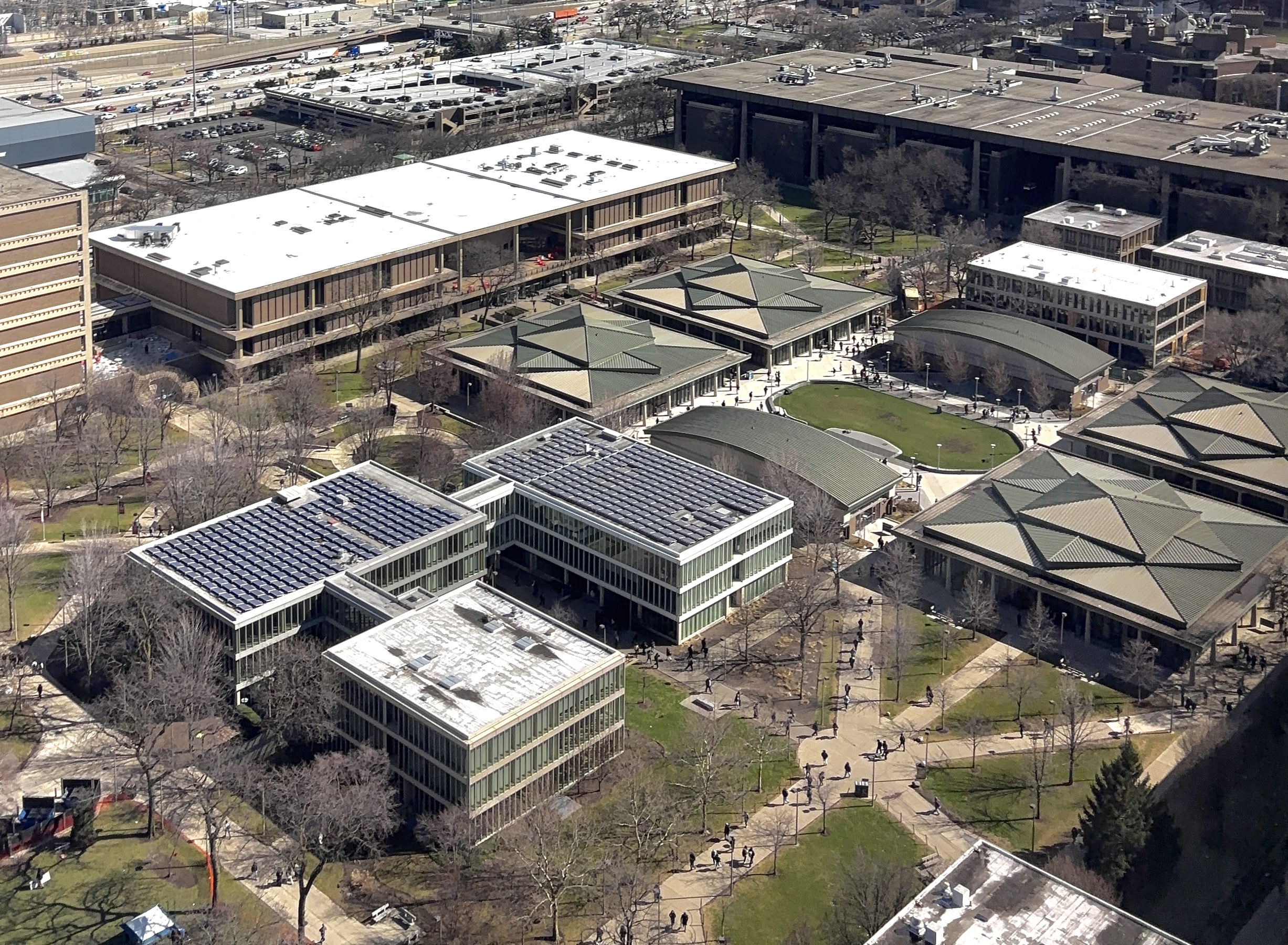
A view of the quad from the top floor of University Hall

The East Campus is located on the Near West Side, just south of Greektown and a 15-minute walk from downtown Chicago. The juxtaposition of campus and commercial density was a direct result of large-scale urban renewal led by Mayor Richard J. Daley.

The Circle Court Shopping Center was a shopping center and office complex at 500 South Racine Avenue in Chicago. Completed in 1973, the five-acre property contained 209,600 square feet of space and 350 parking spaces. In 1990, the University of Illinois authorized negotiations to acquire the property for university use. By 1993, university records identified it as the Student Services Building and described it as the former Circle Court Shopping Center. By May 1993, university records referred to the property as the Student Services Building and identified it as the former Circle Court Shopping Center.

The West Campus, also on the Near West Side, is much older and includes some buildings built in the collegiate gothic style. The colleges of Medicine, Pharmacy, Nursing, Dentistry, Applied Health Sciences and Public Health, as well as the Library of the Health Sciences are all located on the West Campus. The West Campus is in the heart of the Illinois Medical District where the University of Illinois Medical Center is located.

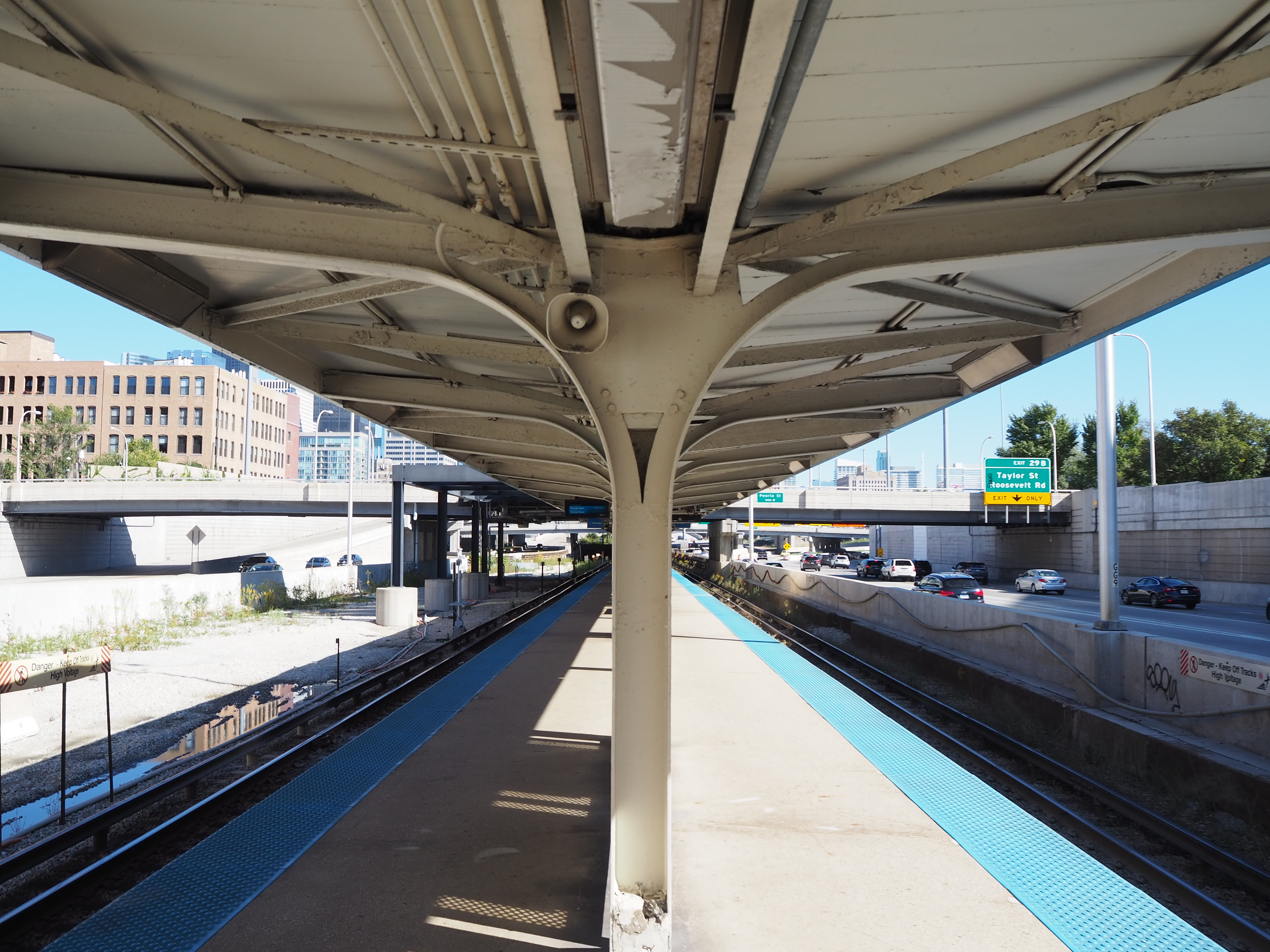
UIC–Halsted station on the CTA's Blue Line

The Chicago Transit Authority's Blue Line, part of the Chicago 'L', runs through the median of the Eisenhower Expressway along the north side of the campus. Three Blue Line stations are close to the university: UIC-Halsted, Racine, and Illinois Medical District. The Pink Line serves UIC's west campus on Polk Street and runs directly to the Loop.

=== Campus housing ===
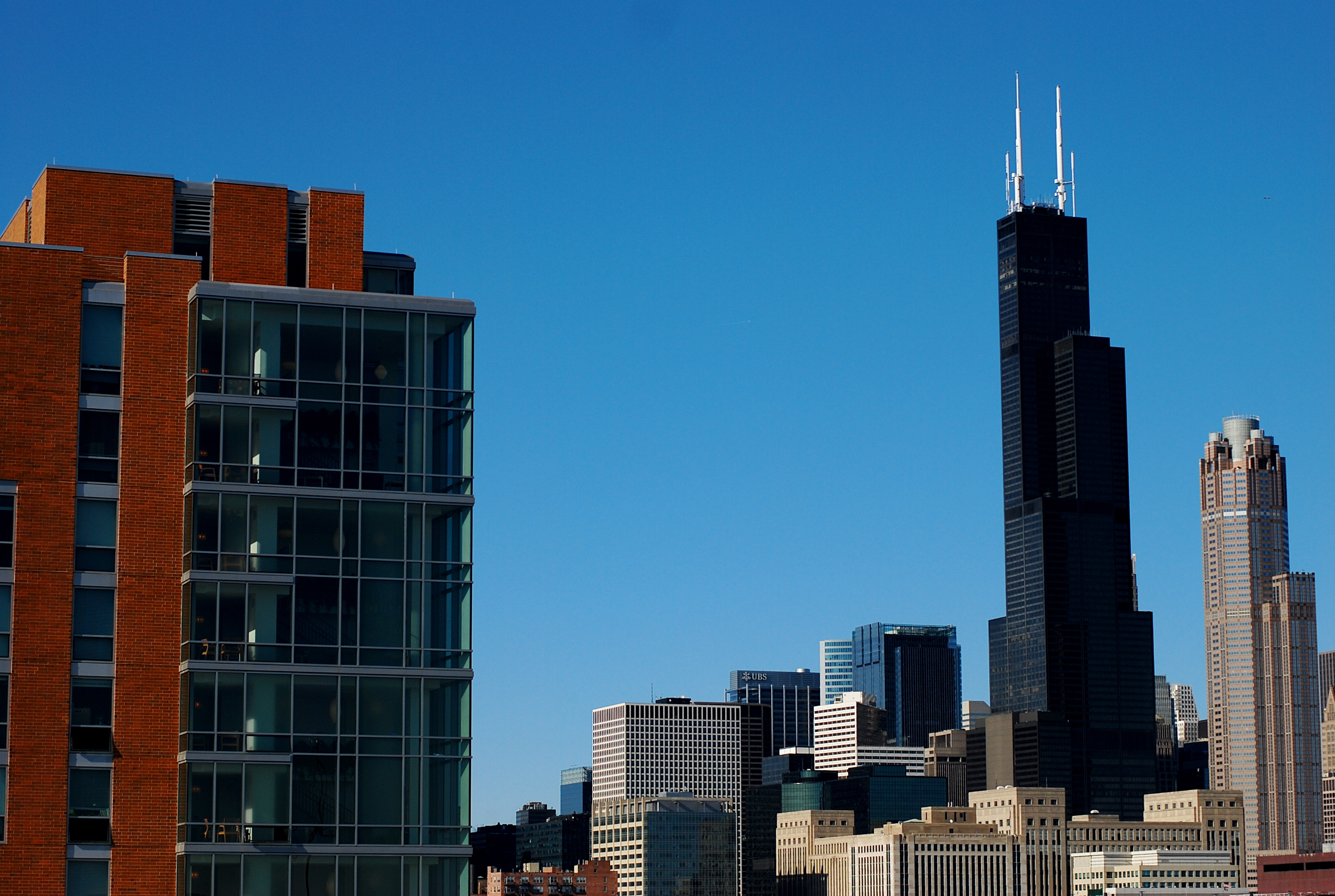
UIC's James Stukel Towers residence hall with downtown Chicago and Willis Tower in the background

UIC offers ten residence halls for its students. The East Campus contains five residence halls, the South Campus contains three, and the West Campus contains two. Until the South Campus expansion, UIC students were still predominantly commuters. However, the administration has worked to change the campus to one where most students are residential. Nearly 6,000 students live within one-and-a-half miles of campus. 3,800 students, including over half of all freshmen, live in UIC's nine residence halls. There are also thousands of apartments within walking distance to classes.

On the East Campus, Commons West and Commons South are traditional halls with double rooms opening into a common hallway; each floor shares a common bathroom. Courtyard and Commons North are cluster-style buildings with rooms grouped to share a small private bathroom. These four buildings are connected to the Student Center East which houses a cafeteria, the campus bookstore, a convenience store, bowling/billiards, a barber shop, and the Inner Circle (an assortment of fast food restaurants).

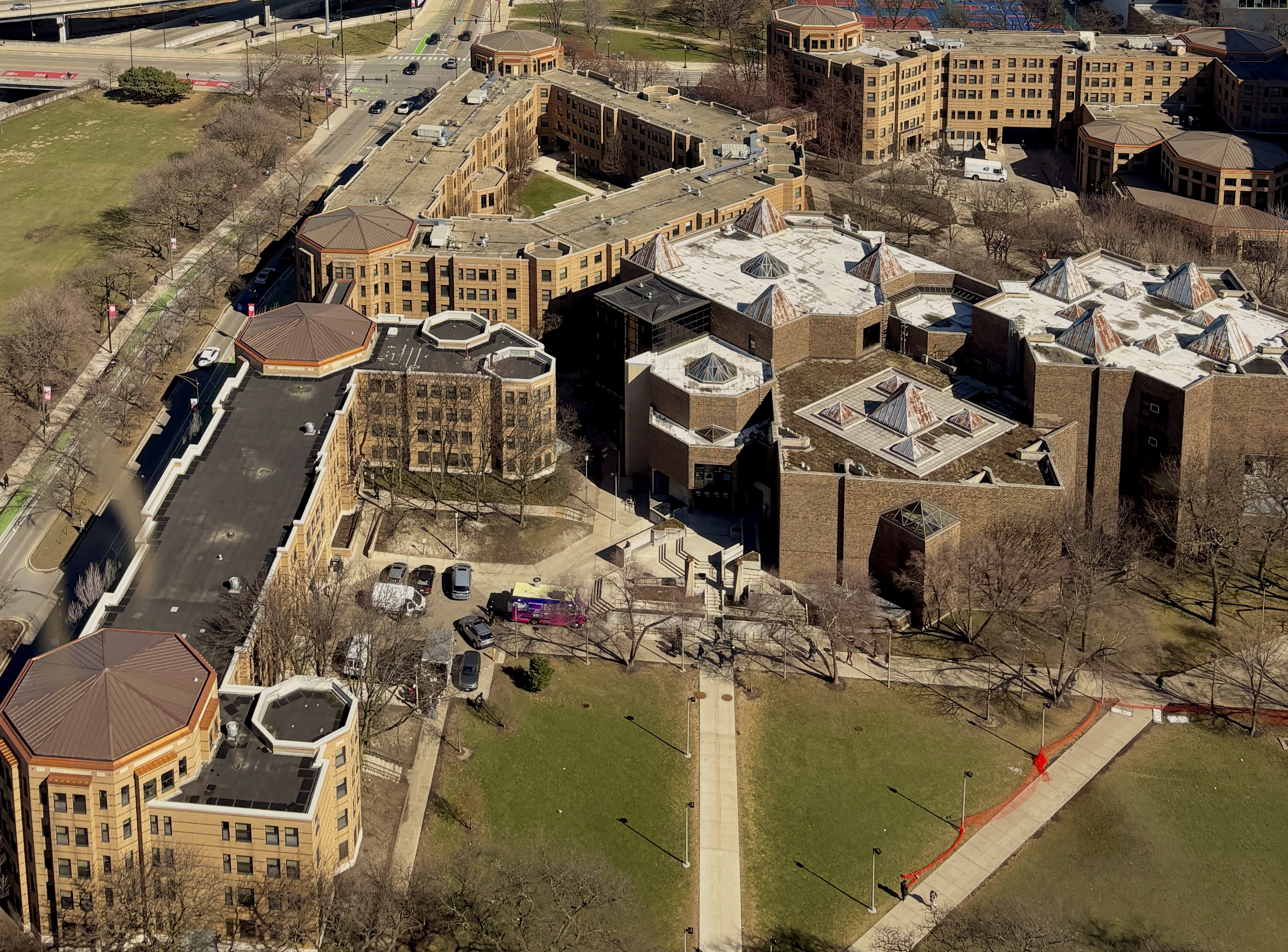
Courtyard & Commons dormitory buildings on the east campus (next to the building of Architecture, Design, & The Arts)

West Campus housing is composed of the Single Student Residence (SSR, apartments for graduate students) and Polk Street Residence (cluster style rooms). South Campus is home to Marie Robinson Hall and Thomas Beckham Hall, both apartment style buildings. In the fall of 2007, James Stukel Towers opened containing suite style rooms with a bathroom and living room. In keeping with UIC culture, students often refer to residence halls by abbreviations instead of their full names (e.g. "TBH" instead of "Thomas Beckham Hall").

The main purpose of the SSR is to house graduate students, undergraduate students of the ages 24 and older, and professional students. The third and fourth floors house undergraduate students of the ages of 21 through 23. The nursing house is located on the 16th floor. The fifth floor of the SSR has a pilot program for students with families. The program can house up to 15 families. Residents of the family program are zoned to Chicago Public Schools. Families living in the SSR are assigned to Washington Irving Elementary School and Crane High School.

The Academic and Residential Complex, ARC, was opened in response to the ongoing enrollment increase at the university. The building consists of large lecture halls, smaller discussion section classrooms, meeting rooms, and student housing. The building also has a small gym for student occupants and a Starbucks.

=== Student recreation ===
The UIC Student Recreation Facility (SRF) is a recreational complex for UIC students. Opened in spring 2006, the SRF features a three-story climbing wall, multipurpose courts for games, and a pool with adjoining lazy river. There is also a recreational facility on the west side of the campus. The Sport and Fitness Center, SFC, comprises a fitness floor, Olympic pool, steam room, multipurpose courts, and racquetball courts and much more. UIC Campus Recreation also oversees the Outdoor Field Complex, OFC, on the south side of campus. This outdoor complex comprises two large multipurpose fields. Campus Recreation hosts a variety of programs that promotes the wellness and well-being of students throughout the academic year. Such events includes RecFest, Destress fest, and many more.

=== Medical center and College of Medicine ===
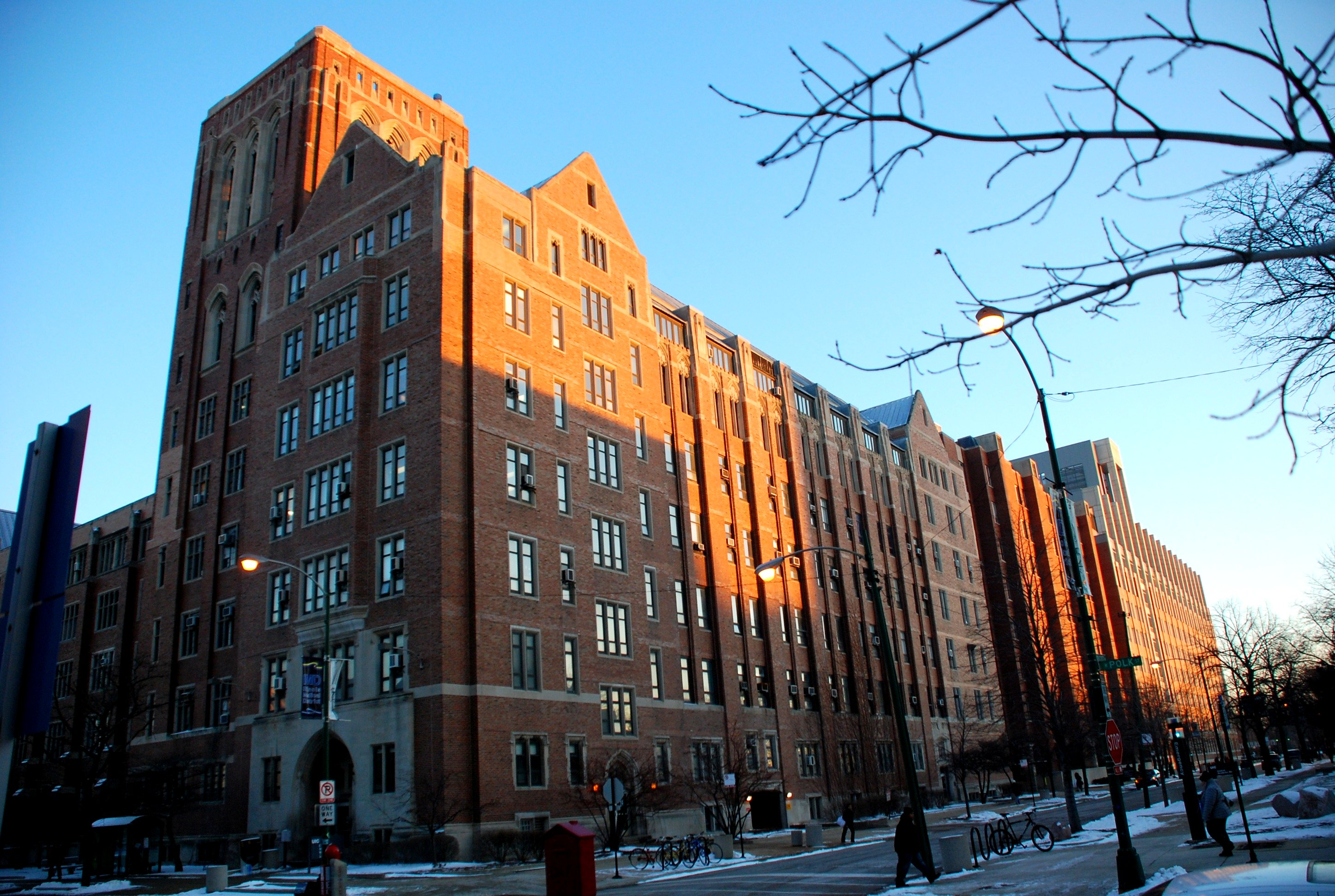
UIC College of Medicine West Tower

The University of Illinois College of Medicine offers a four-year program leading to the MD degree at three different sites in Illinois: Chicago, Peoria, and Rockford. (Urbana-Champaign faculty no longer participate in the University of Illinois College of Medicine, with the establishment of the Carle Illinois College of Medicine, hosted entirely at the flagship campus.) UIC is a major part of the Illinois Medical District (IMD). While IMD's billing itself "the nation's largest urban medical district" may be up for debate, the district is a major economic force contributing $3.3 billion to the local economy and supporting 50,000 jobs. In popular culture, UIC College of Medicine was the Medical School affiliated with Cook County Hospital in the television series E.R.

=== Campus renovations ===
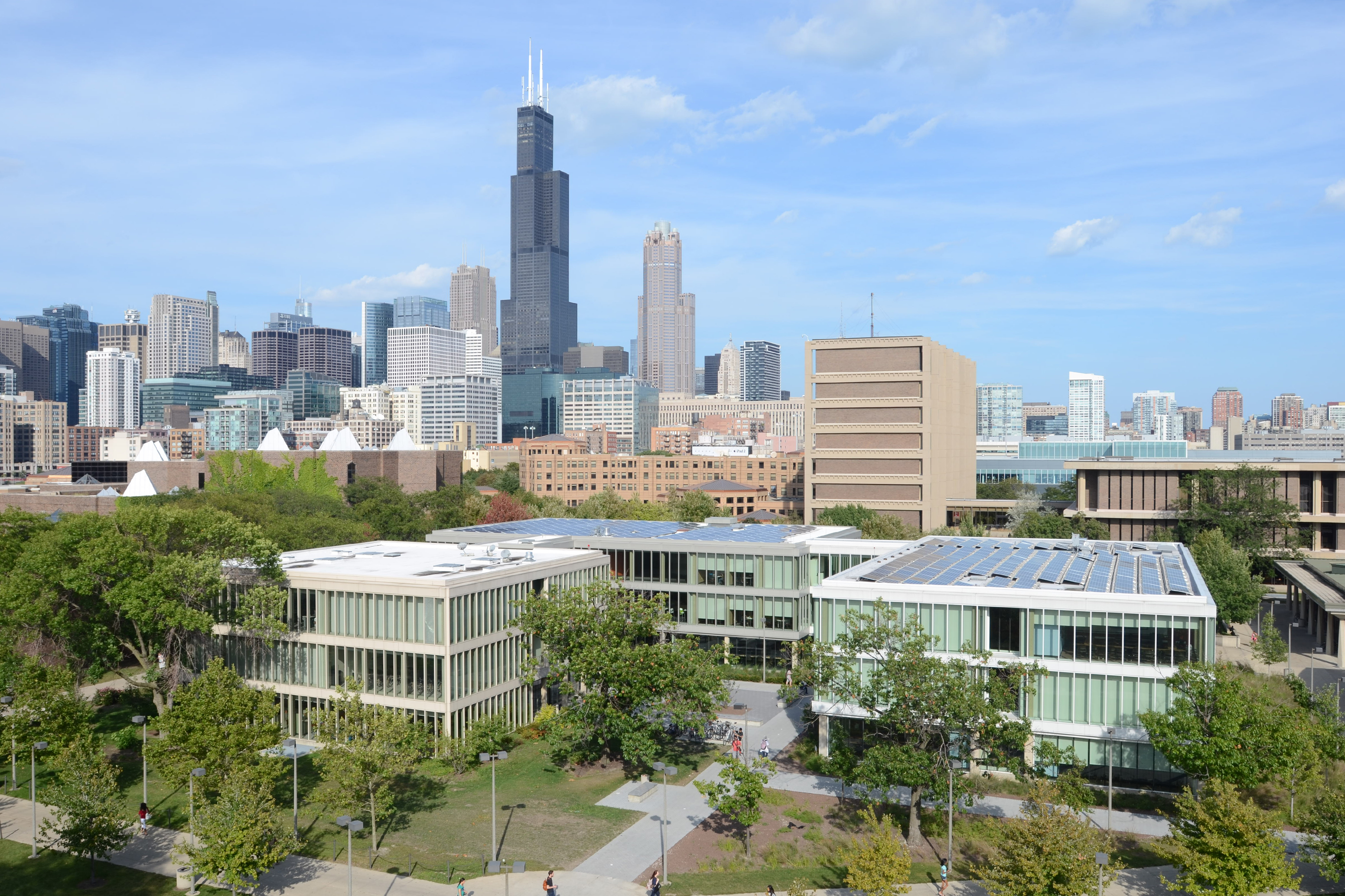
Douglass, Grant, and Lincoln Halls with the Chicago Loop skyline in the background

After the major $550 million South Campus expansion, the university began renovating existing facilities on campus. This focus is in part due to a constrained state budget: state funds for new buildings are scarce. Since renovation is less costly, this approach is being used to update facilities.

The first such renovations were to three original "pillbox" buildings: Grant Hall, Lincoln Hall, and Douglas Hall. The renovated buildings use solar and geothermal power which required digging fifty wells 500 feet into the ground east of University Hall. The energy savings of 20–25% led to Lincoln Hall and Douglas Hall being certified US LEED Gold. Grant Hall did not apply for LEED certification even though it was the prototype for many of the features found on Lincoln and Douglas Halls. The new fascia are all glass and the buildings contain facilities for faculty and students. There are plans to expand the renovation project to every lecture hall cluster if the pilot program is successful.

Other campus renovations include the roof of the Behavioral Sciences Building and the terrace of the Education, Performing Arts, and Social Work building. A brand new building housing the College of Engineering was opened in 2019 to accommodate the increased enrollment in the college. It features the only high bay structural laboratory in the city of Chicago.

To accommodate the rising enrollment in the computer science department, a new building is being constructed called the Computer Design Research and Learning Center (CDRLC); it is slated to be completed in the fall of 2024, with a budget of $117.8 million.

=== Sustainability ===
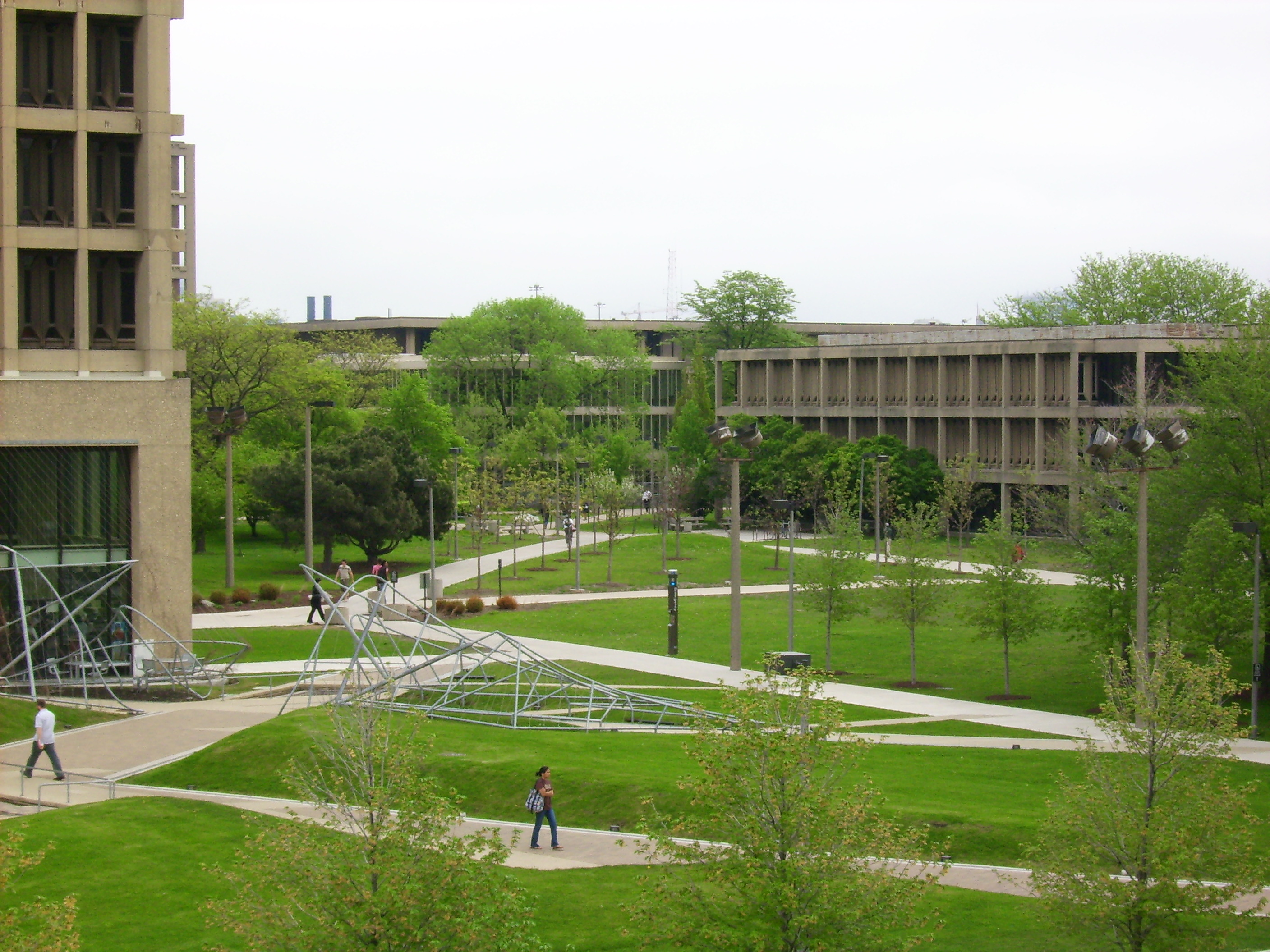
East campus in the spring

The university's Office of Sustainability was founded in January 2008. Current sustainability initiatives include lighting upgrades, building envelope improvements, metering upgrades, and landscape waste composting. Recent work on Grant, Lincoln, and Douglas Halls included upgrading them to use geothermal heat pumps, which efficiently heat and cool the building. The university has approved a Climate Action Plan.

=== Regional campuses ===
The College of Nursing operates on five other campuses in central and northern Illinois:

- Peoria Campus (The College of Nursing maintains an online campus, whereas the College of Medicine has a physical campus in Peoria.)
- Quad Cities Campus (Moline, Illinois)
  - Students who live in Illinois or Iowa pay in-state tuition.
- Rockford, Illinois (the UIC Health Sciences Campus)
  - The UIC Health Sciences Campus in Rockford is shared with UIC's colleges of medicine and pharmacy.
- Springfield, Illinois (at the UIS campus)
- Urbana, Illinois (at the UIUC campus)
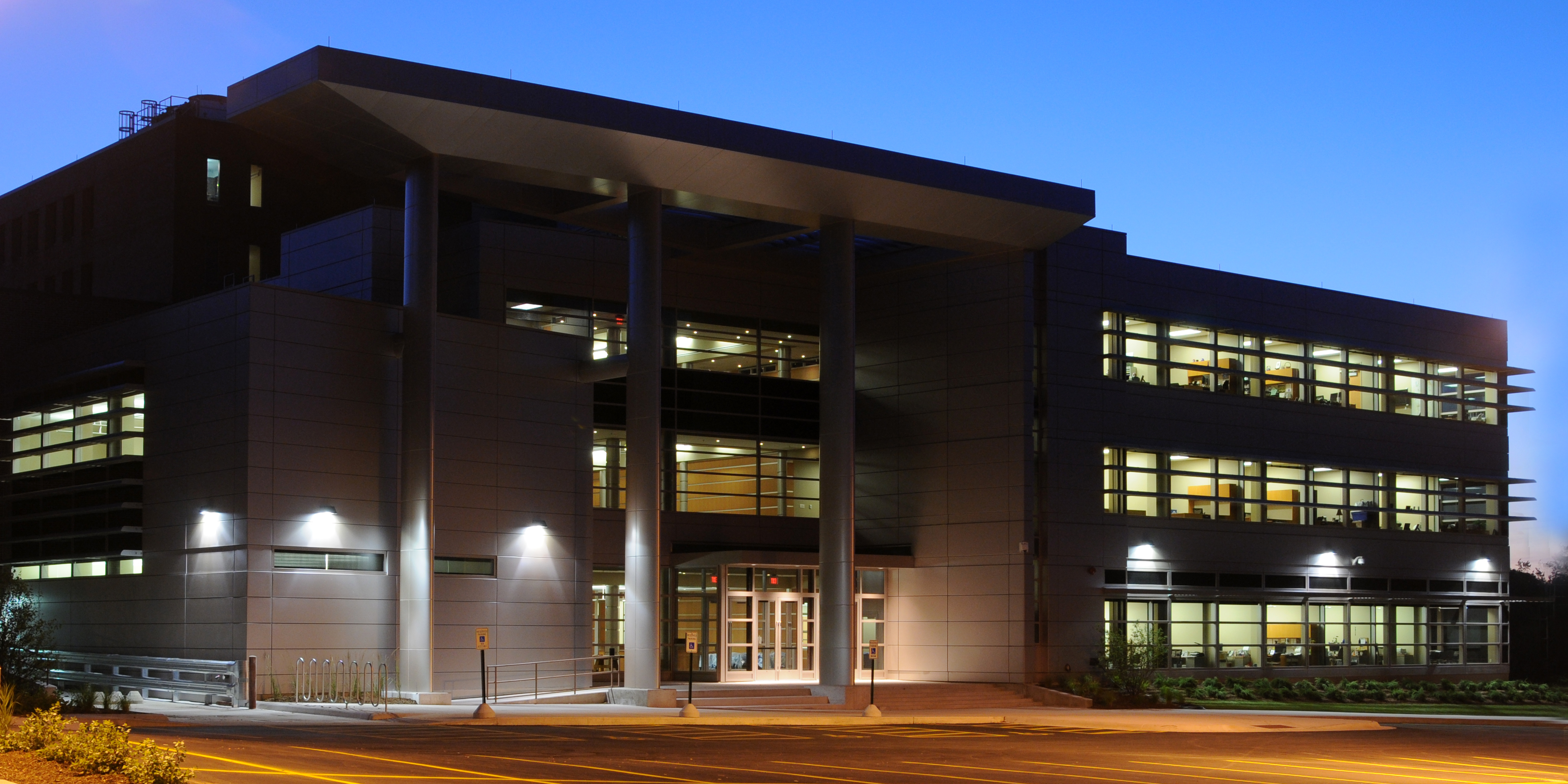
College of Pharmacy – Rockford Campus

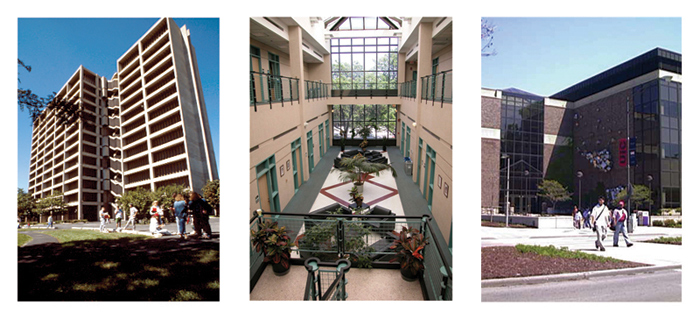
College of Engineering Buildings

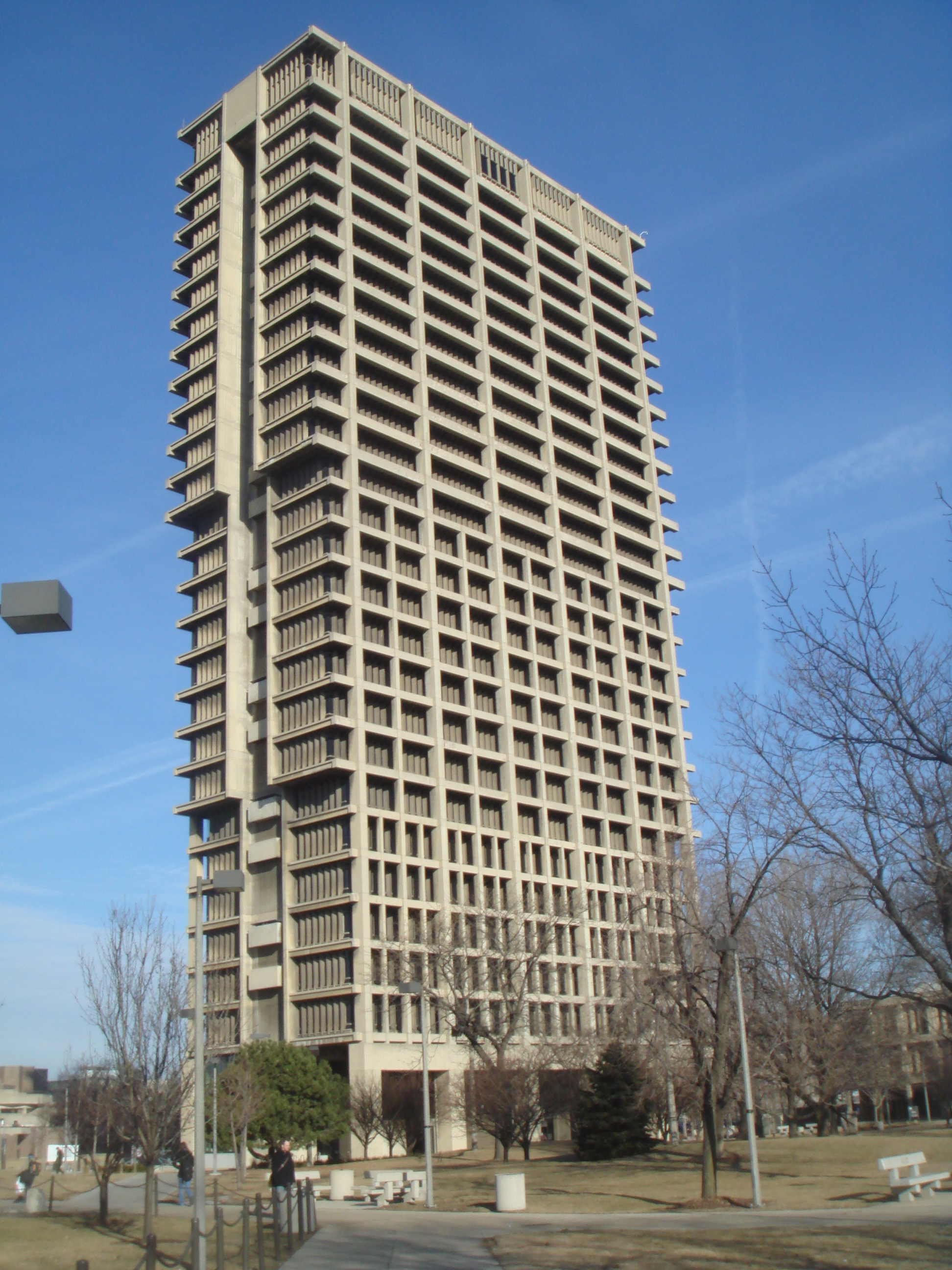
University Hall at East Campus

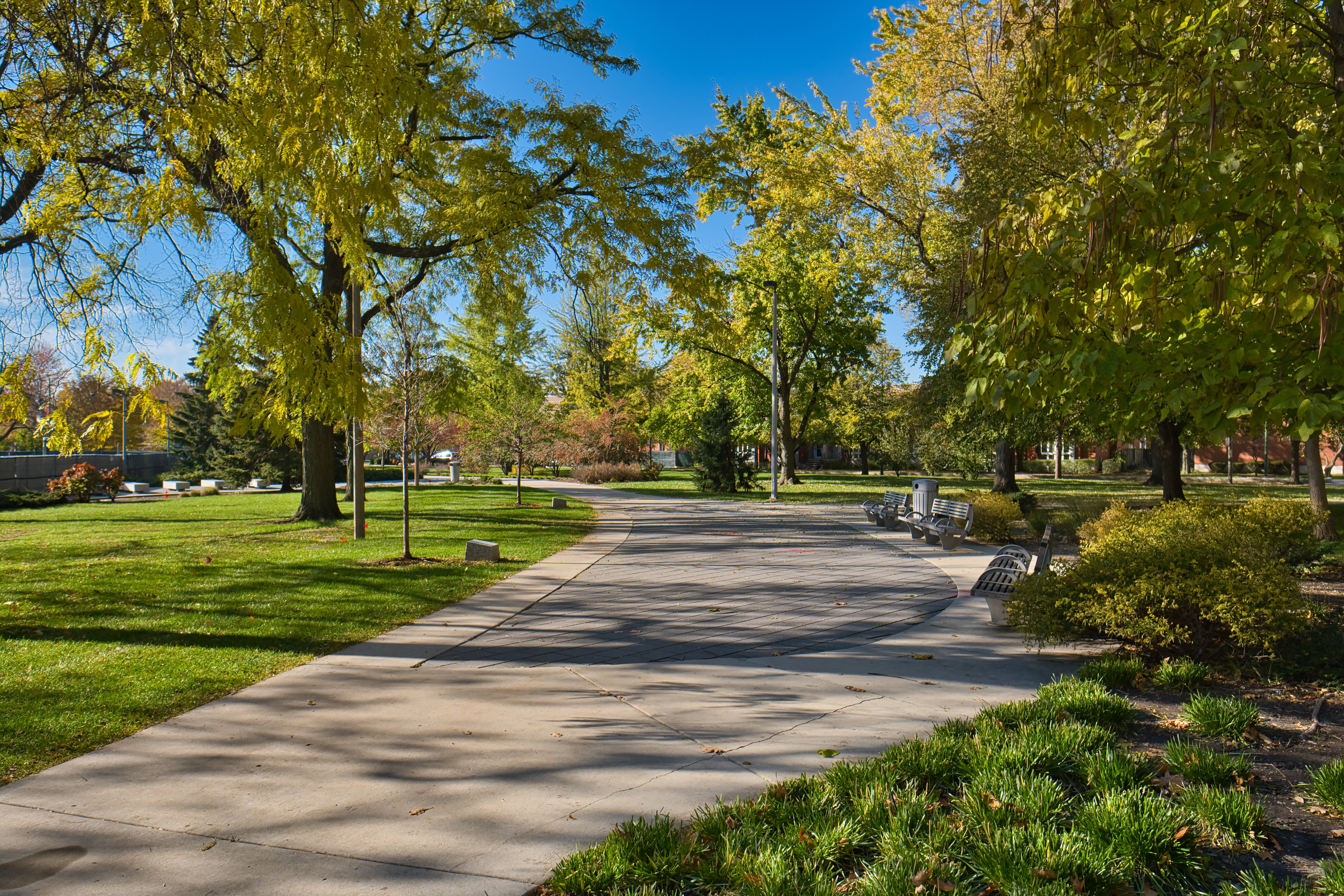
Fall at UIC

== Academics ==
College/school	Year founded
Pharmacy	1859
Medicine	1882
Dentistry	1891
Law	1899
Liberal Arts and Sciences	1946
Engineering	1946
Architecture, Design, and the Arts	1946
Nursing	1951
Graduate College	1965
Social Work	1965
Business	1965
Education	1965
Public Health	1970
Urban Planning and Public Affairs	1973
Applied Health Sciences	1979
Honors College	1982

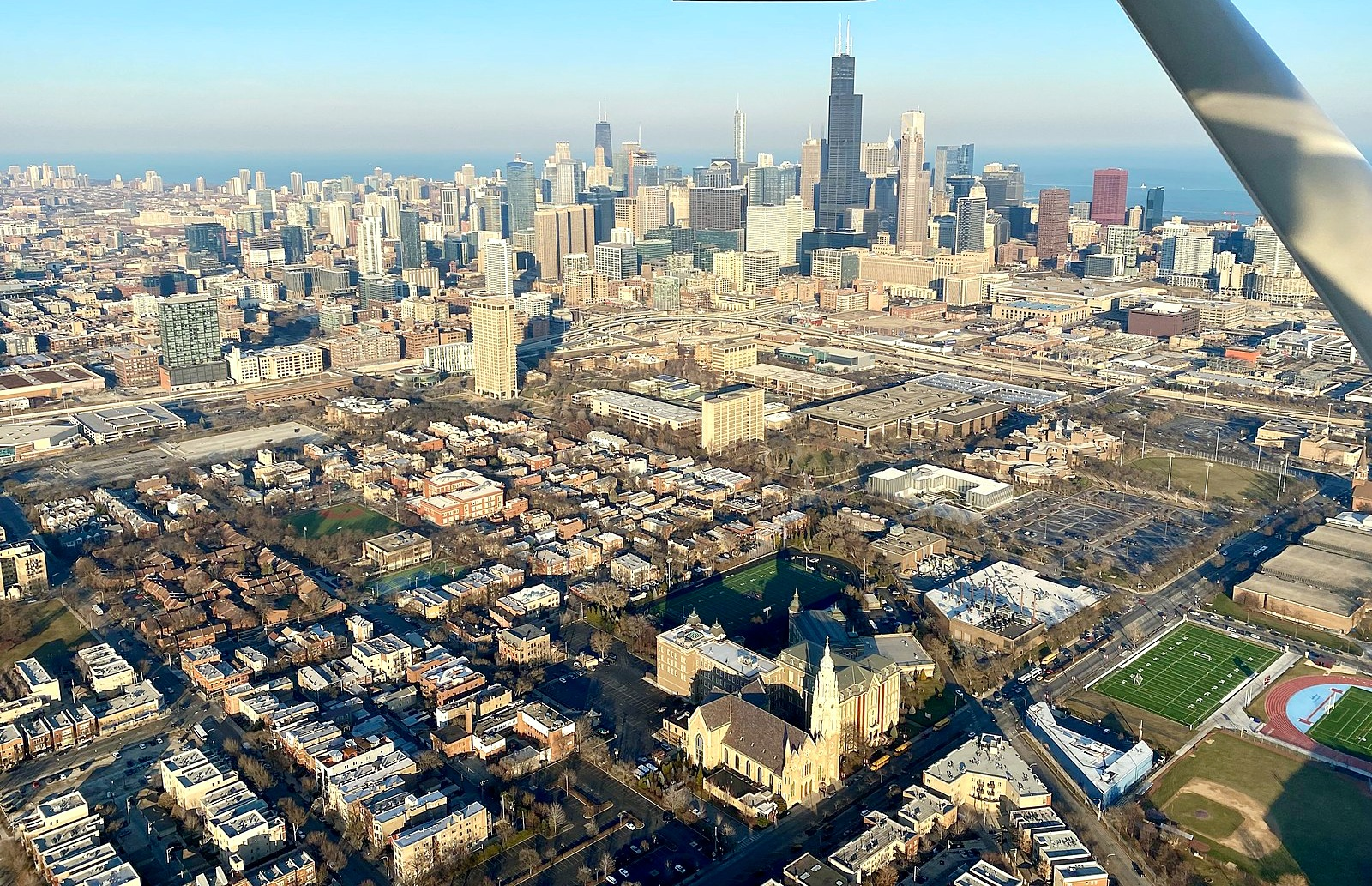
UIC campus from the air in December 2019

The University of Illinois Chicago offers over 90 bachelor's degrees, 100 master's degrees, and 60 doctoral degrees through its 16 colleges, in addition to the university's specialized honors college and the omnibus graduate college. UIC offers eleven inter-college programs, some of which are organized as centers.

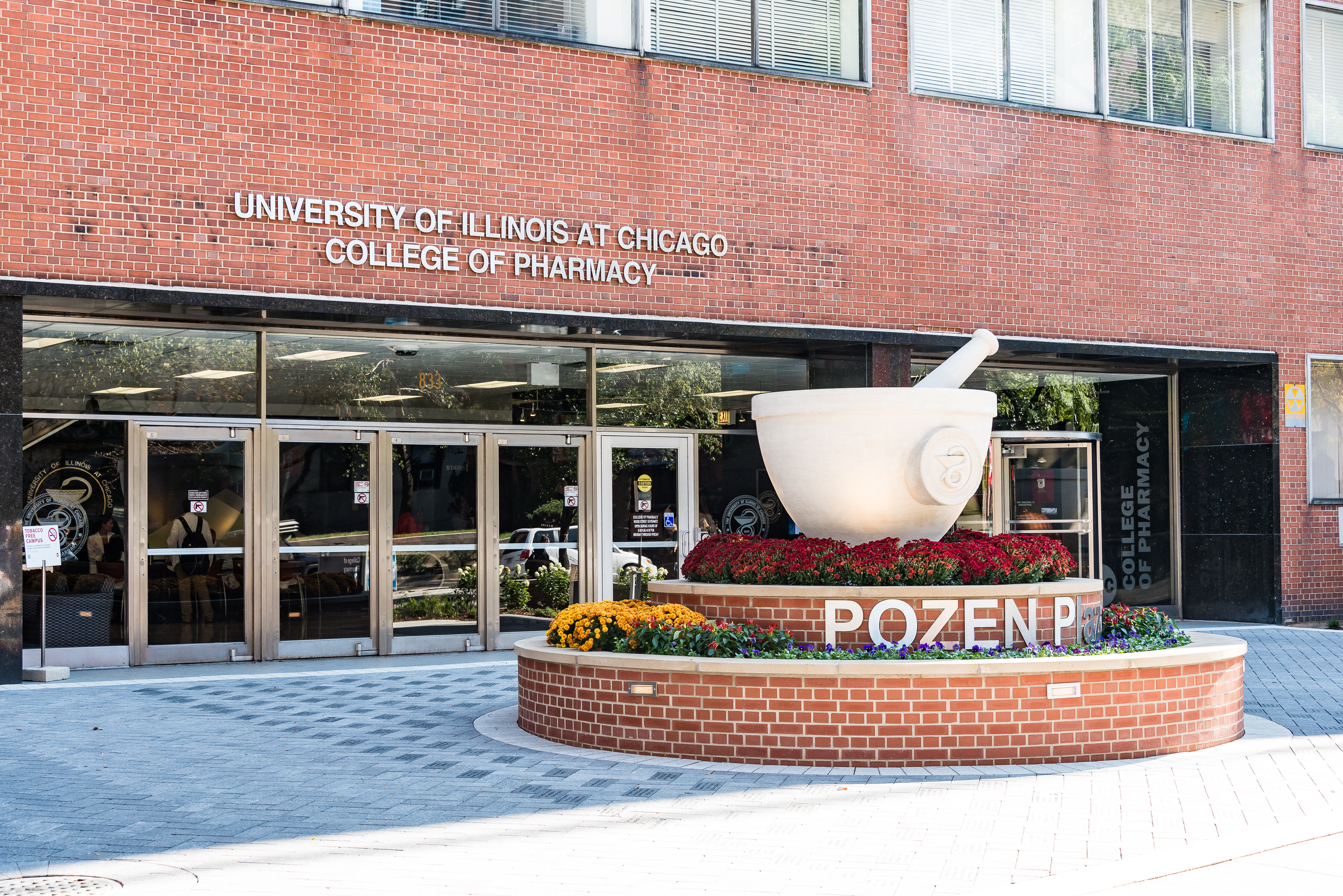
UIC College of Pharmacy

The university is governed by the chancellor who is supported by seven vice chancellors, one CEO for administrative functions, and fifteen college deans. There is a library dean and three regional deans for colleges of medicine.

UIC merged with the John Marshall Law School in 2019 and formally became the University of Illinois Chicago School of Law. It is the first public law school in the city of Chicago.

One in ten Chicagoans with a college degree is a UIC alumnus. Approximately one in eight Illinois physicians is a graduate of the College of Medicine (the nation's largest medical school). One in three Illinois pharmacists is a graduate of the College of Pharmacy. Half of all the dentists in Illinois are graduates of the College of Dentistry.

=== Reputation and rankings ===
Academic rankings

National
- Forbes: 99
- U.S. News & World Report: 80
- Washington Monthly: 26
- WSJ/College Pulse: 55

Global
- ARWU: 301–400
- QS: 334 (tie)
- THE: 201–250
- U.S. News & World Report: 261 (tie)

National Program Rankings
Program	Ranking
Biological Sciences	80
Biostatistics	28
Chemistry	74
Clinical Psychology	63
Computer Science	54
Earth Sciences	98
Economics	74
Education	71
Engineering	65
English	32
Fine Arts	42
Health Care Management	27
History	43
Law	161
Mathematics	43
Medicine: Primary Care	Tier 2
Medicine: Research	Tier 2
Nursing: Midwifery	16
Occupational Therapy	3
Pharmacy	15
Physical Therapy	41
Physics	73
Political Science	81
Psychology	62
Public Affairs	34
Public Health	18
Social Work	28
Sociology	45
Statistics	51

Global Subject Rankings
Program	Ranking
Artificial Intelligence	62
Arts and Humanities	189
Chemistry	315
Clinical Medicine	173
Computer Science	116
Electrical and Electronic Engineering	106
Engineering	300
Mathematics	211
Molecular Biology and Genetics	190
Pharmacology and Toxicology	111
Physics	204
Psychiatry/Psychology	152
Social Sciences and Public Health	191

UIC is classified among "R1: Doctoral Universities – Very high research activity." According to the National Science Foundation, UIC spent $361 million on research and development in 2018, ranking it 69th in the nation.

In the 2023 U.S. News & World Report's ranking of colleges and universities, the University of Illinois Chicago ranked as the 82nd best national university and the 40th best national public university. In the 2018 Washington Monthly ranking of national universities, UIC ranked as the 26th best national university in the U.S. In 2014–15, Academic Ranking of World Universities placed UIC in the 150–200 bracket in the world and 68–85 in the U.S. In 2016–17, the Times Higher Education World University Rankings placed UIC 63rd in the U.S. and 200th in the world. In 2014, Times Higher Education 100 Under 50 University Rankings (a comparison of universities less than 50 years old) placed UIC in the 3rd position in the U.S. and 13th in the world. The 2014/15 QS Worldwide University rankings placed UIC in the 186th position. Forbes ranked the University of Illinois Chicago 131st out of 500 universities in "America's Top Colleges 2025". Forbes also ranked UIC as the 16th best school in the Midwest.

In the 2012 rankings by the Institute of Higher Education in Shanghai, UIC tied for 51st–75th in the subject area of social sciences, 76th–100th in the subject area of medicine, and 101st–150th in the subject areas of life/agricultural sciences and natural sciences and mathematics.

In U.S. News & World Report's 2015 rankings, published in 2014, the University of Illinois Chicago Liautaud Graduate School of Business was ranked 92nd for among best business schools for its full-time MBA program.

== Student life ==
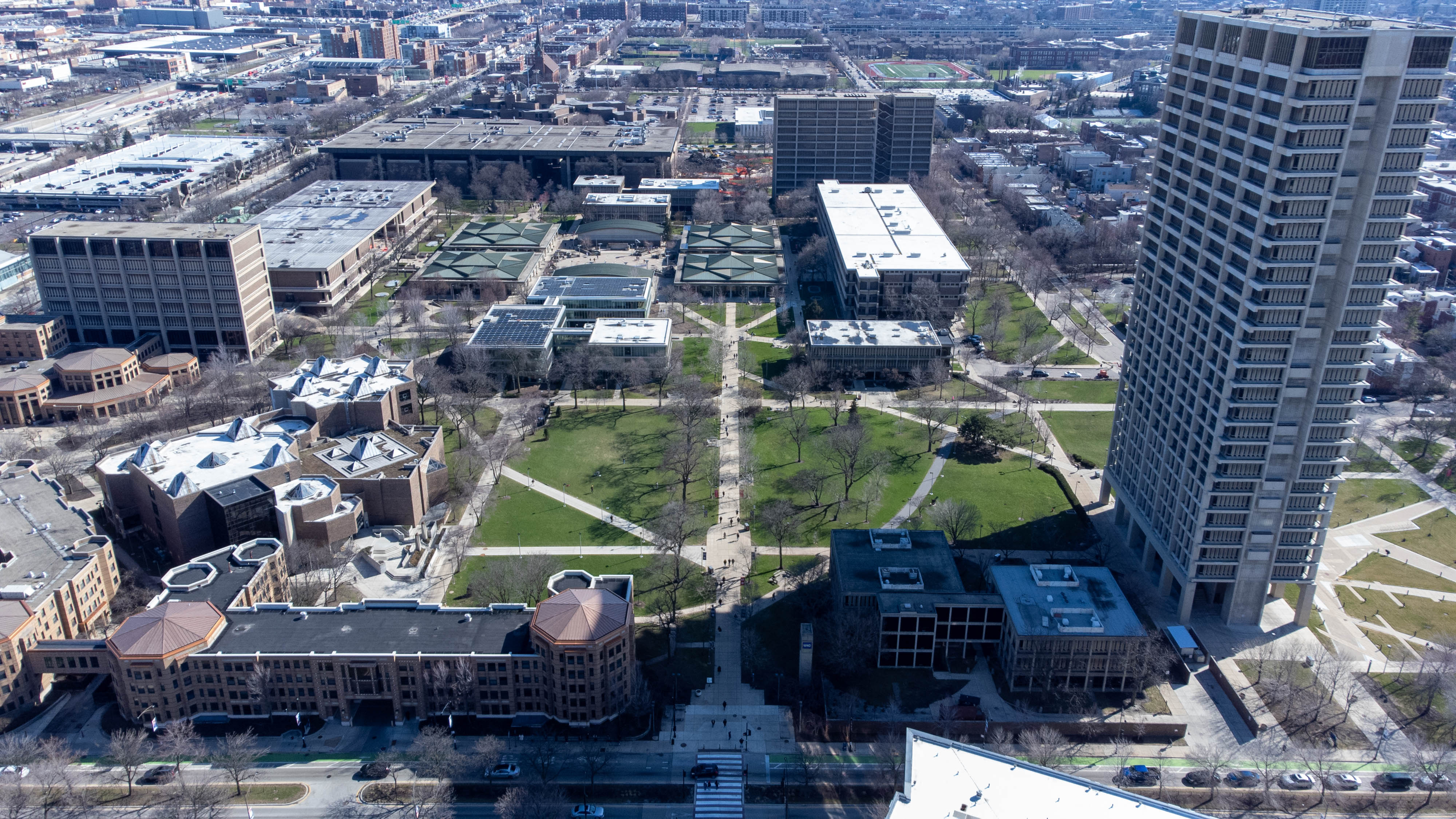
The UIC Quad in April 2022

The university is located near the neighborhoods of Taylor Street, Greektown and Pilsen with restaurants, and bars nearby. Downtown Chicago is a 10-minute walk or a short CTA ride away.

UIC has a wide variety of amenities in its Student Centers. There are two on campus, one on the east side and one on the west side.

=== Spark in the Park ===
Spark in the Park is an annual music festival that is held on Harrison field, off Halsted and Harrison, except in 2014 and 2015, when it was held in the UIC Pavilion due to construction on the Eisenhower Expressway Interstate 290. It is held during the second week of classes in the fall. The first year it was held was in 2010 where Kid Cudi was the headliner, followed by Lupe Fiasco in 2011, Childish Gambino in 2012, Kendrick Lamar in 2013, and J. Cole in 2014. In 2015 Twenty One Pilots were the headliners and also featured Wale. In 2016, rapper Young Thug was the opening act followed by a performance by both Daya and Travis Scott. In 2017, Nick Jonas performed along with DRAM. In 2018 rapper Rich The Kid headlined the show, and in 2019 21 Savage performed at the event.

=== Greek life ===
UIC houses 27 social fraternities and sororities, including both general and culturally based organizations.

== Student body ==
Undergraduate demographics as of fall 2024
Race and ethnicity	Total
Hispanic	36%
White	22%
Asian	20%
Foreign national	8%
Black	8%
Two or more races	3%
Unknown	2%

The student body at UIC consists of more than 30,000 total students, of which nearly 21,000 are undergraduate students. Demographic statistics for the student body as of 2023 were:

The chancellor operates six diversity-related committees on Asian Americans, Blacks, Latinos, LGBT issues, persons with disabilities, and women. The University of Illinois Chicago is a federally designated Hispanic-serving institution (HSI) and Asian American and Native American Pacific Islander-Serving Institution (AANAPISI), and is among the most ethnically diverse universities in the United States.

== Athletics ==
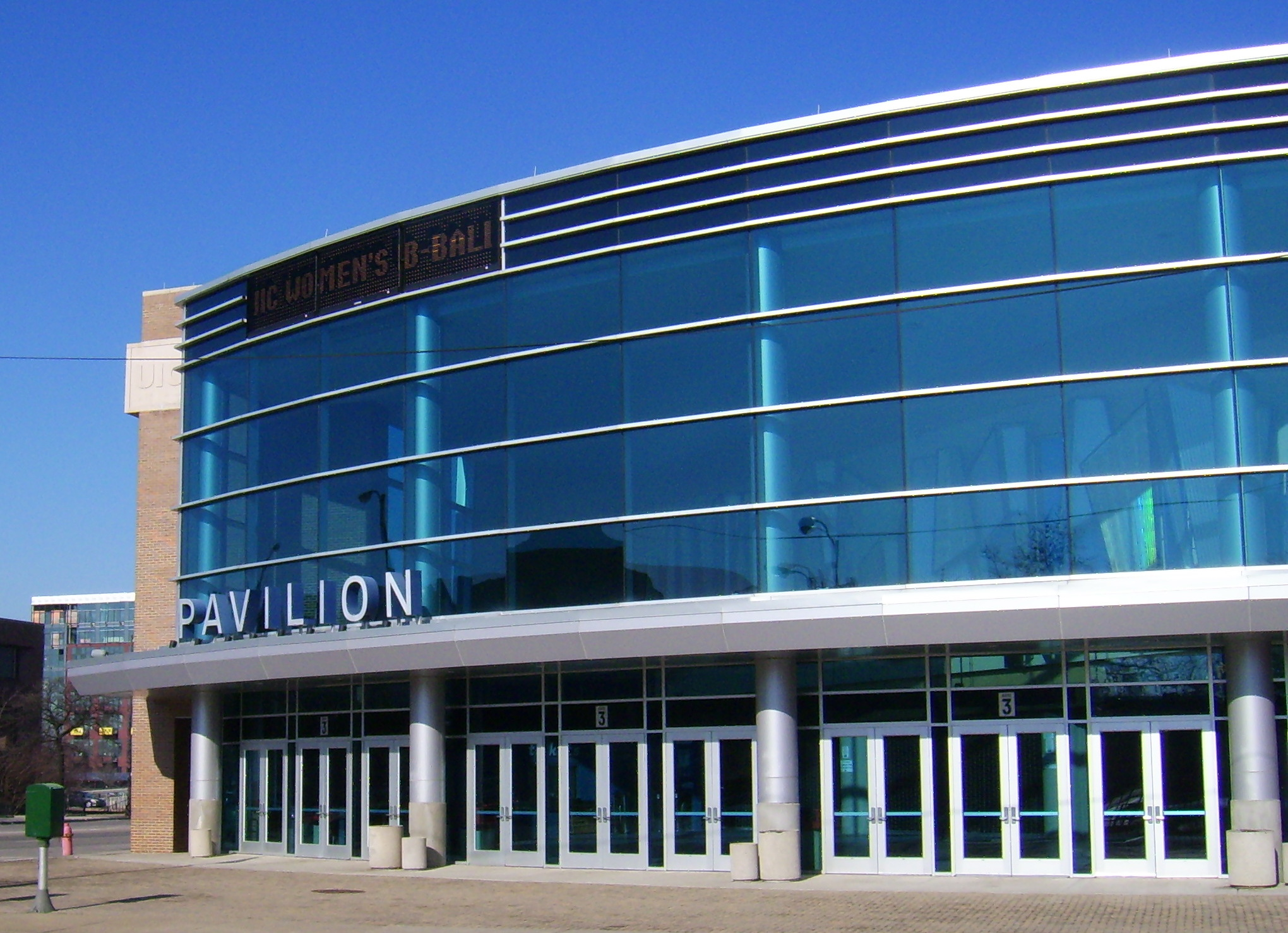
Credit Union 1 Arena

The Illinois–Chicago (UIC) athletic teams are called the Flames, a reference to the 1871 Great Chicago Fire. The university is a member of the Division I level of the National Collegiate Athletic Association (NCAA), primarily competing in the Missouri Valley Conference (MVC) since the 2022–23 academic year. The Flames previously competed in the D-I Horizon League from 1994–95 to 2021–22; in the D-I Mid-Continent Conference (Mid-Con, now currently known as the Summit League since the 2007–08 school year) from 1982–83 to 1993–94; as an NCAA D-I Independent during the 1981–82 school year; and in the Chicagoland Collegiate Athletic Conference (CCAC) of the National Association of Intercollegiate Athletics (NAIA) from 1949–50 to about 1980–81.

UIC competes in 18 intercollegiate varsity sports: Men's sports include baseball, basketball, cross country, soccer, swimming & diving, tennis and track & field (indoor and outdoor); while women's sports include basketball, cross country, golf, soccer, softball, swimming & diving, tennis, track & field (indoor and outdoor) and volleyball.

=== Men's soccer ===
In September 2006, the men's soccer team earned its highest ranking in school history when the SoccerTimes.com College Coaches Poll pegged the Flames at No. 6 in the country. In November 2006, UIC defeated Western Illinois 3–0 in the opening round of the NCAA tournament before falling in the second round to Notre Dame 1–0. UIC finished the 2006 season as the nation's best defensive squad after allowing a mere eight goals in over 1993 minutes of play during 21 matches for a goals-against average (GAA) of 0.36. The GAA was tops in the nation in 2006 and it also ranked fifth all-time in NCAA history. UIC posted 13 shutouts and never allowed more than a single goal in a match. UIC also allowed just two goals after intermission the entire season. Along with the GAA mark, UIC posted the nation's best save percentage with a 0.908 rate.

In 2007, UIC soccer's successful season culminated in an Elite-Eight appearance in the NCAA tournament by way of wins over No. 12 St. Louis, Northwestern, and No. 8 Creighton. In a bid for a Final-Four appearance, UIC fell to Massachusetts 2–1. At season's end, UIC had a record of 13–6–6 and was named a top 10 team by the National Soccer Coaches Association of America (NSCAA).

=== Baseball ===
UIC's baseball team recorded 30 or more victories in a nine-year stretch from 2001 to 2010, won seven straight Horizon League Championships, and advanced to an NCAA regional four times (2003, 2005, 2007, 2008). UIC baseball has recorded regional wins against No. 1 Long Beach State in 2007 and No. 2 Dallas Baptist University in 2008.

=== Gymnastics ===
In 1978 and 1979 the UIC men's gymnastics team won the school's only NCAA team titles at the Division II Championships. Following the 1979 season the men's gymnastics program entered Division I competition and finished the season ranked 10th, Nationally. After the successful 1980 season the remainder of the UIC athletic teams ascended to Division I status. The 1996 men's gymnastics team finished the season in 9th place, the school's highest final ranking among all sports. UIC Men's Gymnastics individual Division I All America honorees include: Paul Fina (Rings), Mike Costa (Pommel Horse, twice), Barry McDonald (Parallel Bars), Shannon Welker (Floor Exercise), Neil Faustino (Vault), and Andrew Stover (Horizontal Bar).

== Notable alumni and faculty ==
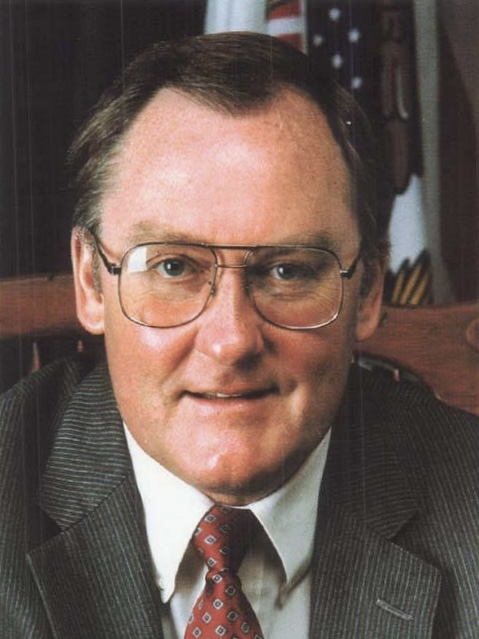
James R. Thompson, governor of Illinois from 1977 to 1991

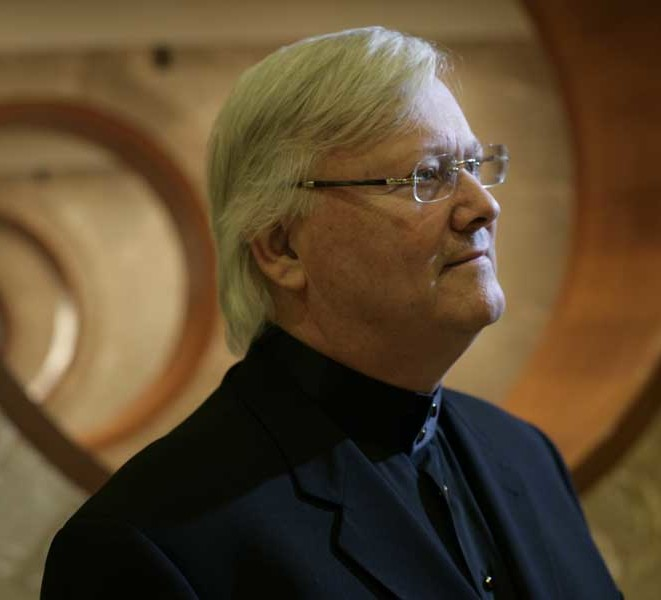
Adrian Smith (1969), architect, designed the Burj Khalifa, Trump Tower, Central Park Tower, and Jin Mao Tower

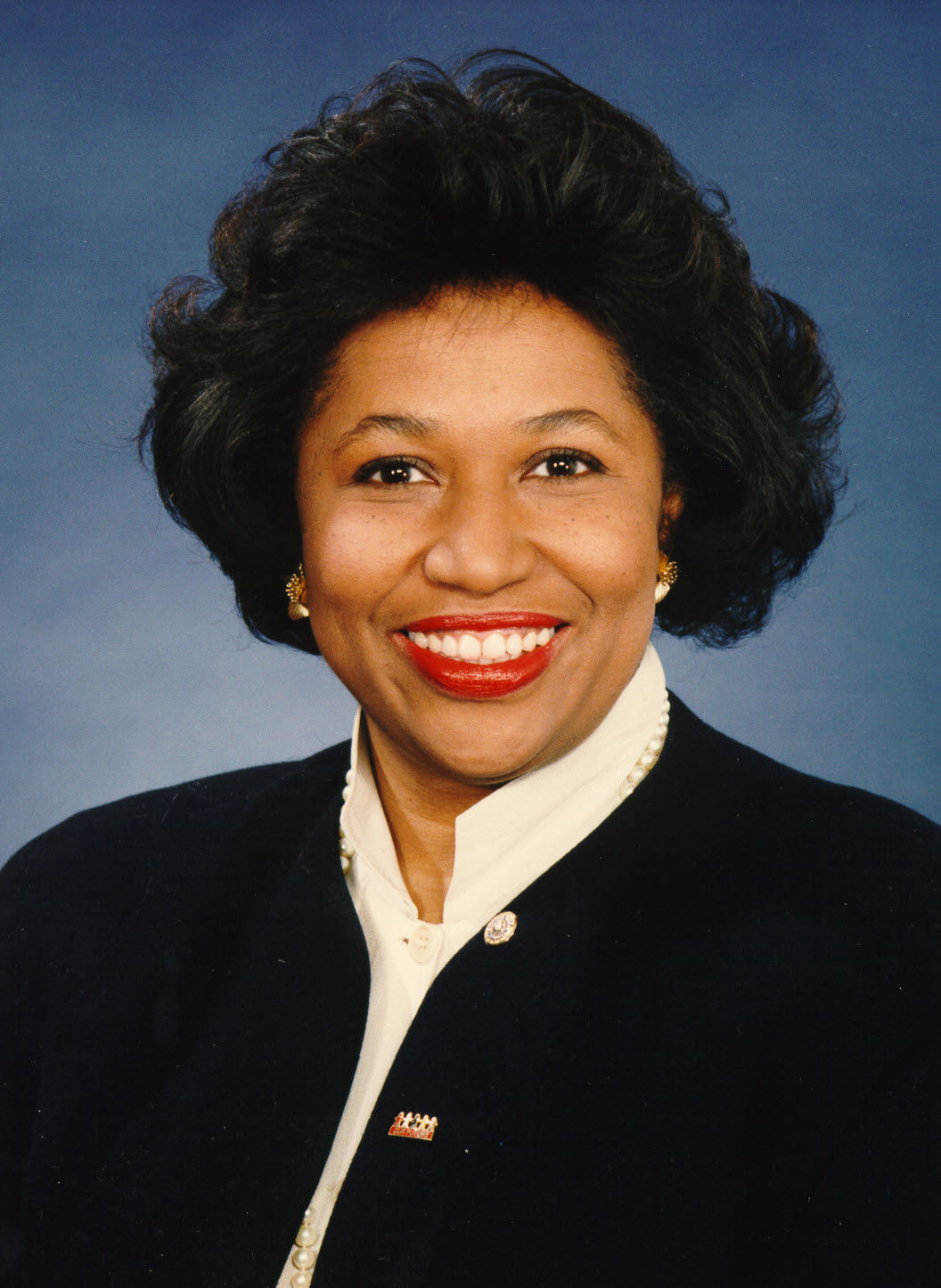
Carol Moseley Braun (BA, 1969), politician and lawyer and the first African-American woman elected to the US Senate

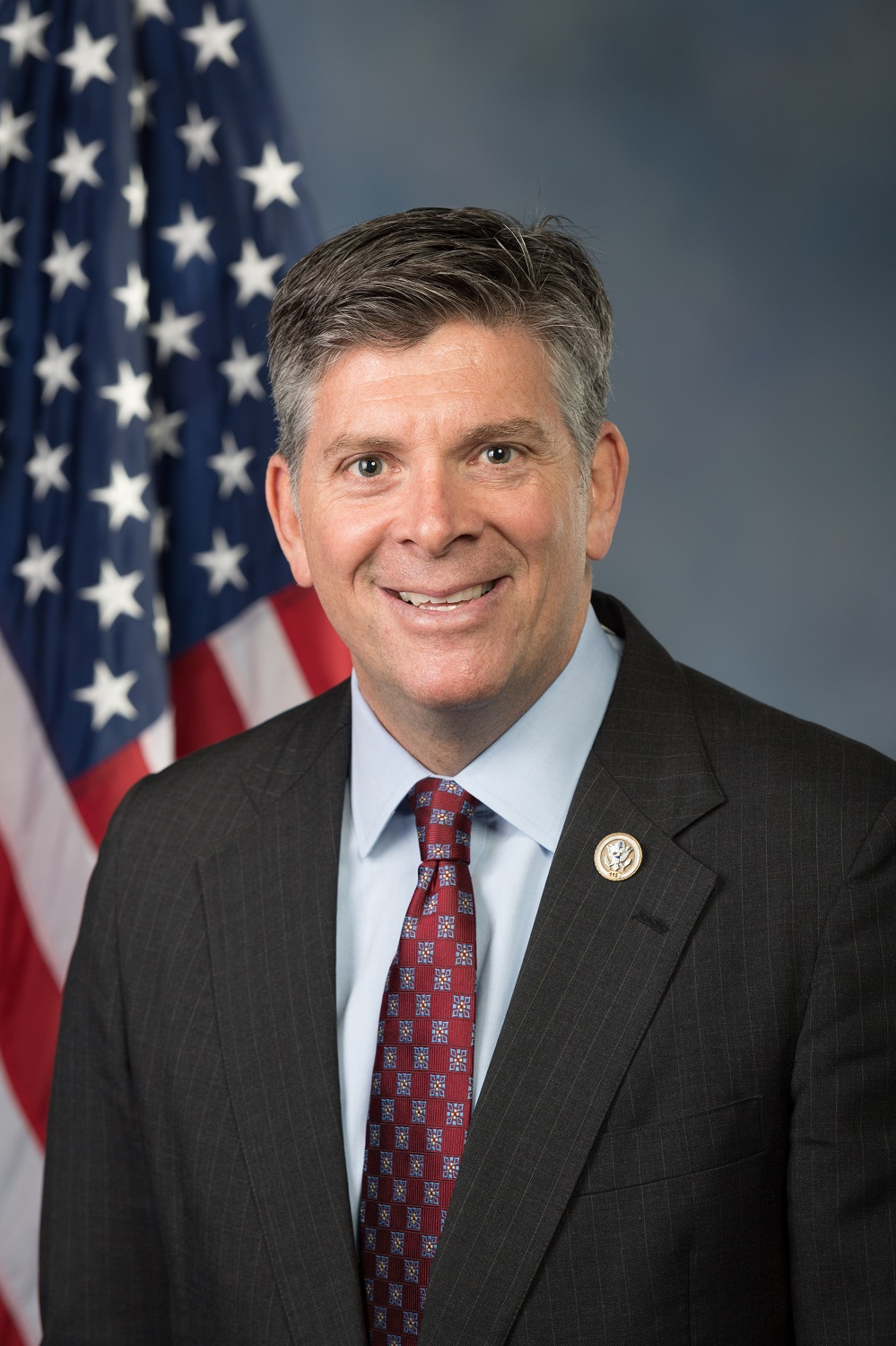
Darin LaHood (JD), U.S. House of Representatives from Illinois

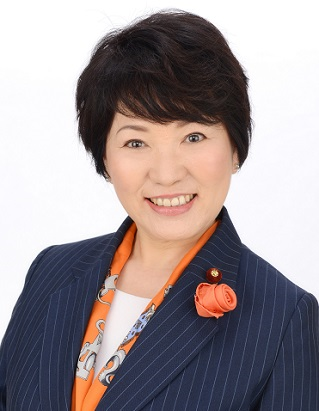
Toshiko Abe (PhD), Japanese politician of the Liberal Democratic Party, member of House of Representatives in the Diet

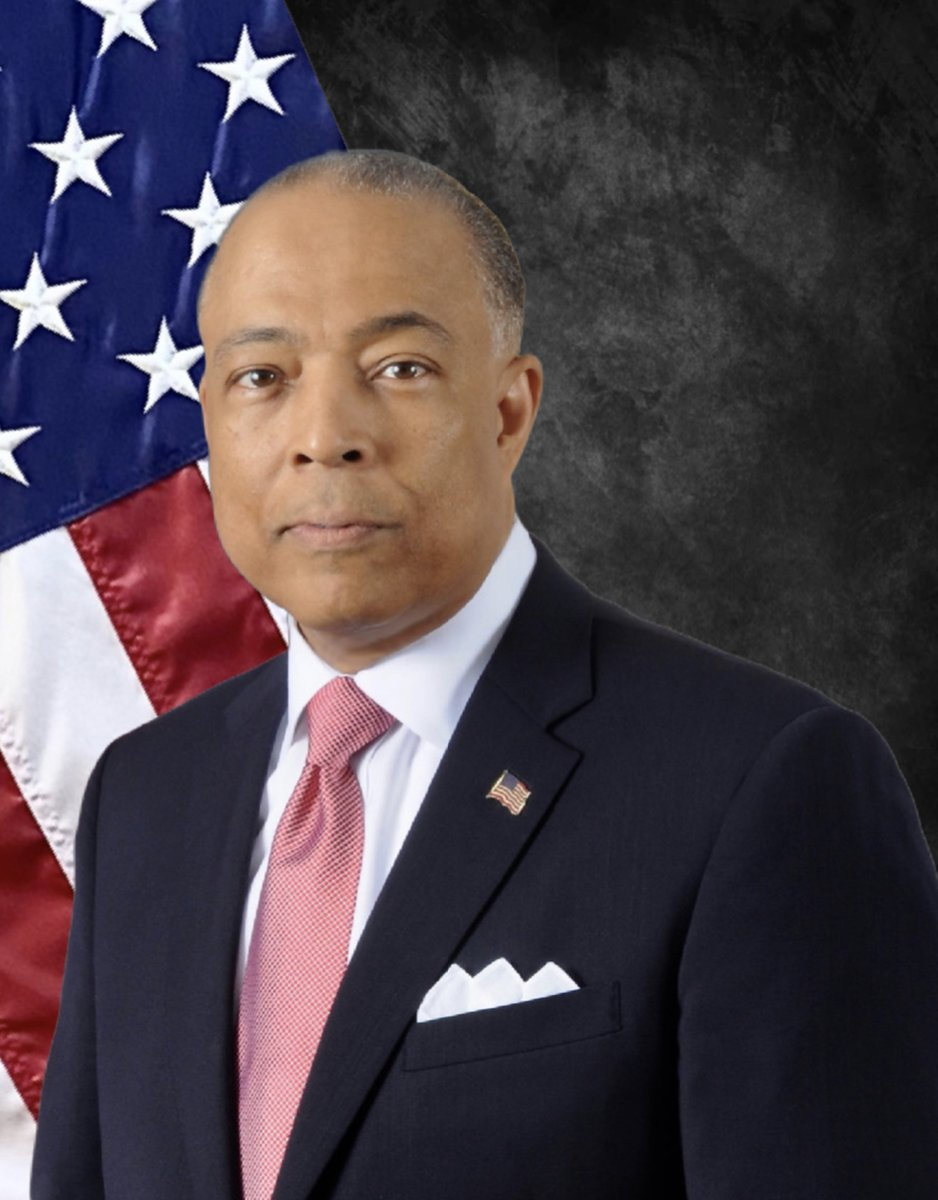
William J. Walker, major general, and Sergeant at Arms of the U.S. House of Representatives

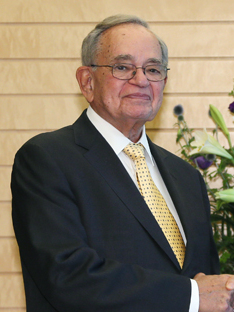
Leo Melamed, chairman emeritus of CME Group

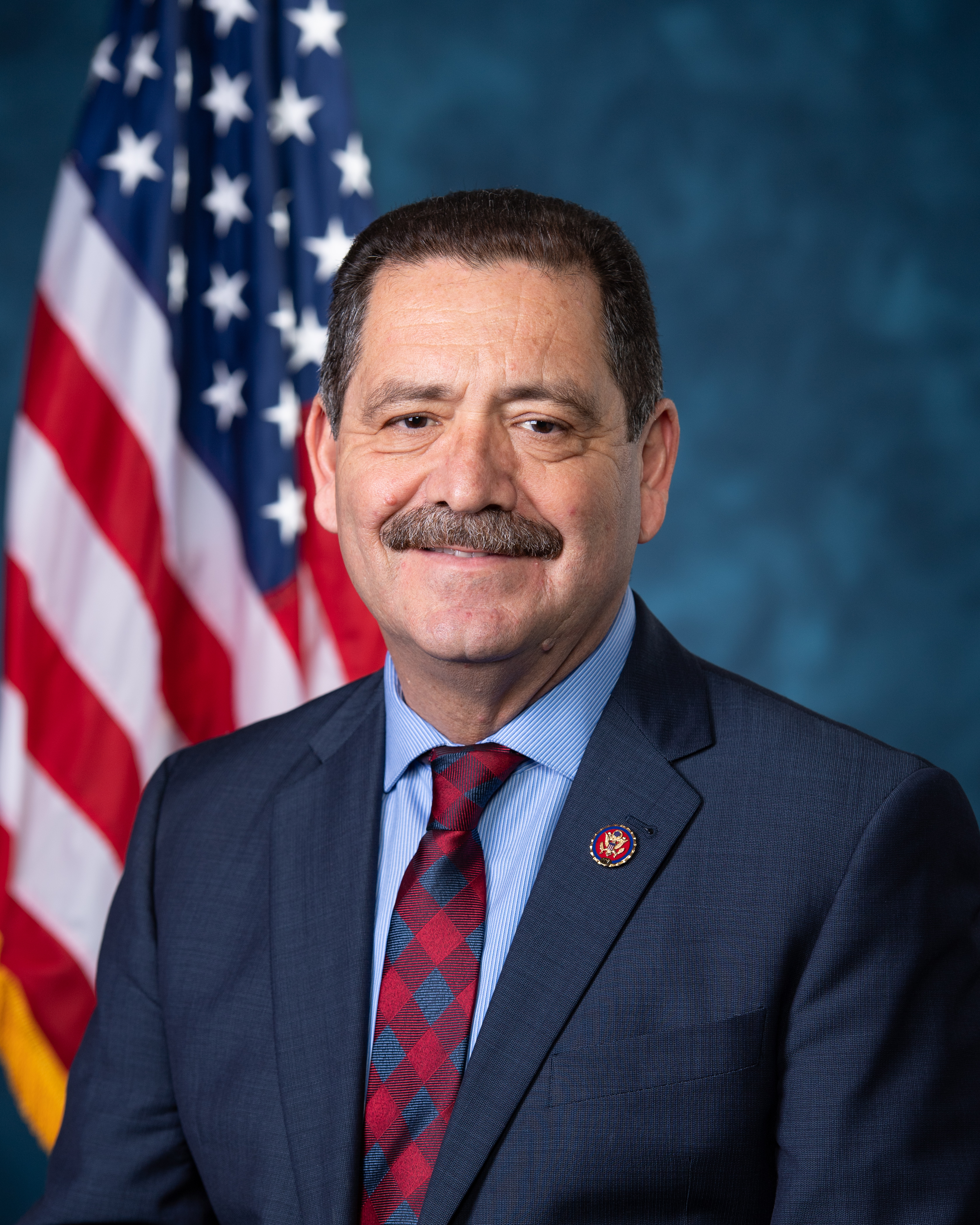
Chuy García, U.S. House of Representatives from Illinois's 4th district

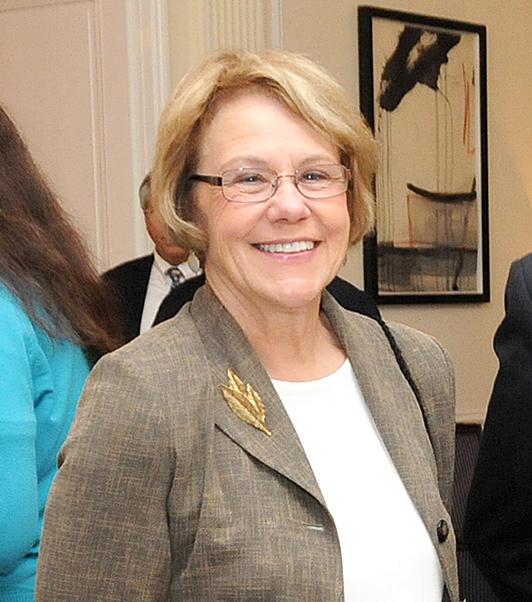
Barbara Schaal (BS), scientist, evolutionary biologist, and professor

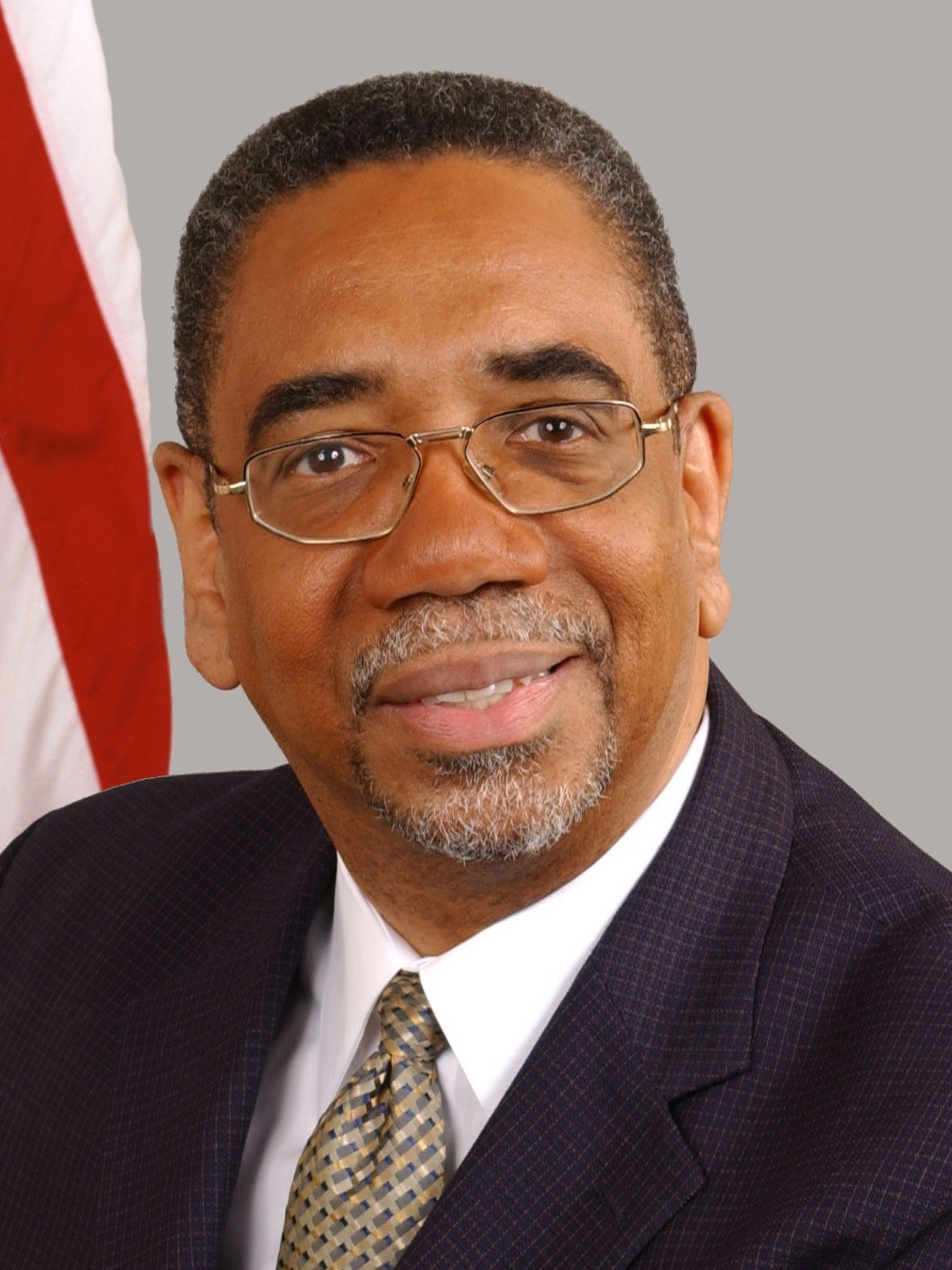
Bobby Rush, U.S. House of Representatives from Illinois's 1st district

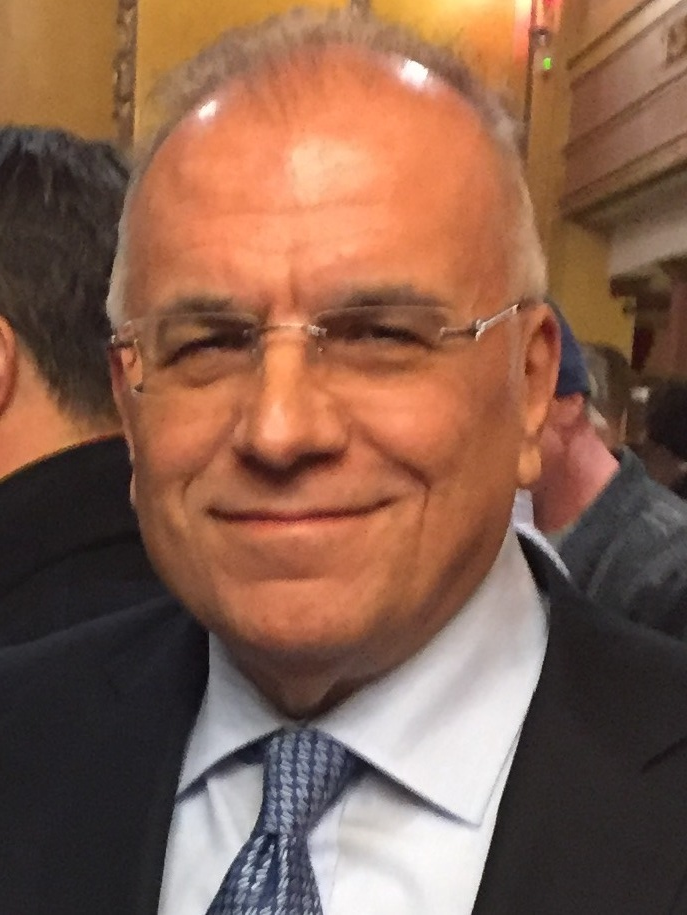
Gery Chico (BA, 1979), former president of the Chicago Board of Education

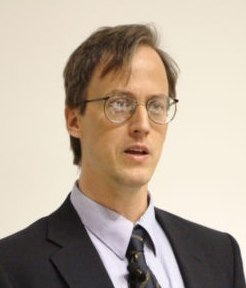
William A. Dembski BA, MS, PhD), mathematician, philosopher and theologian

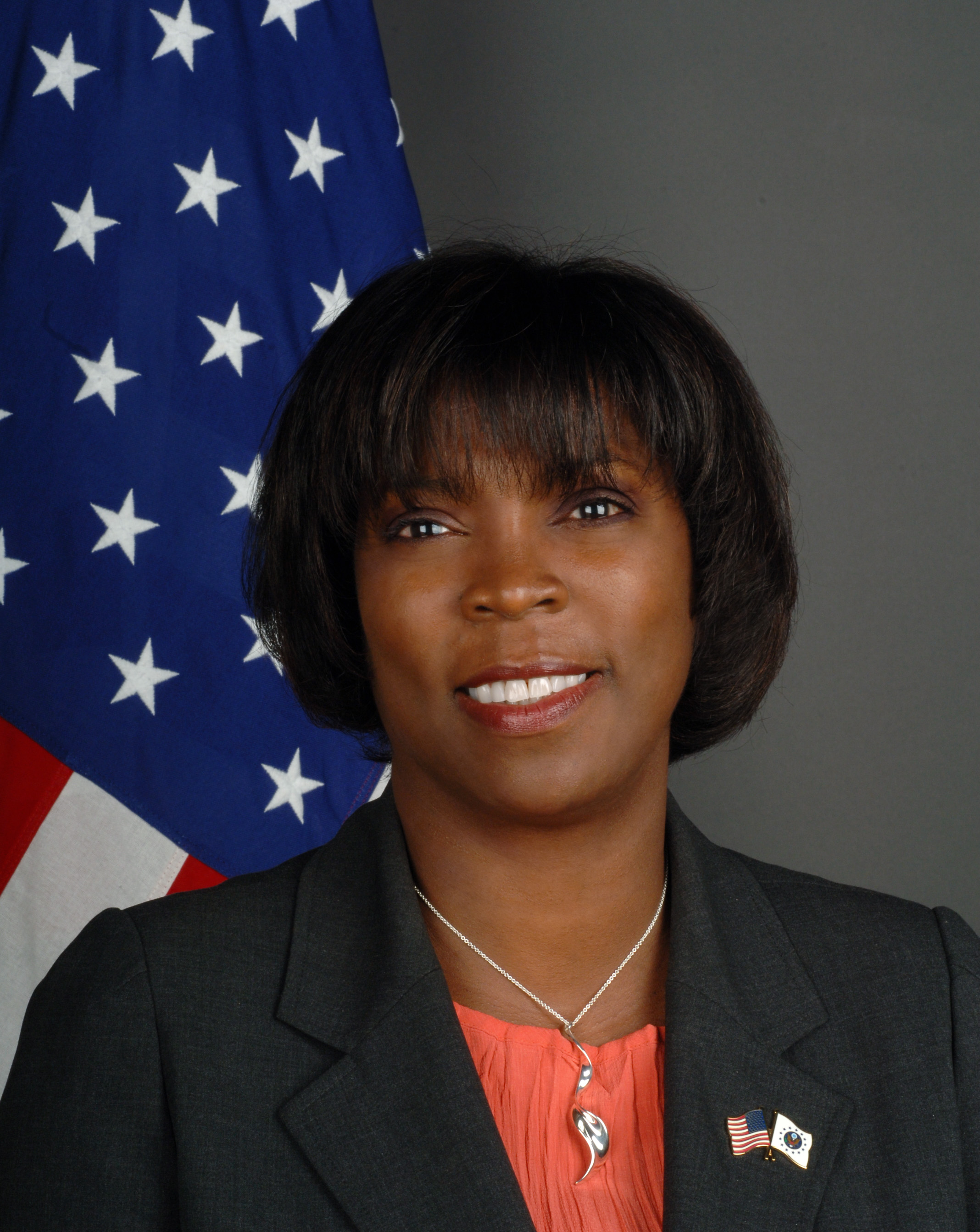
Ertharin Cousin (1979), distinguished fellow of global agriculture at the Chicago Council on Global Affairs

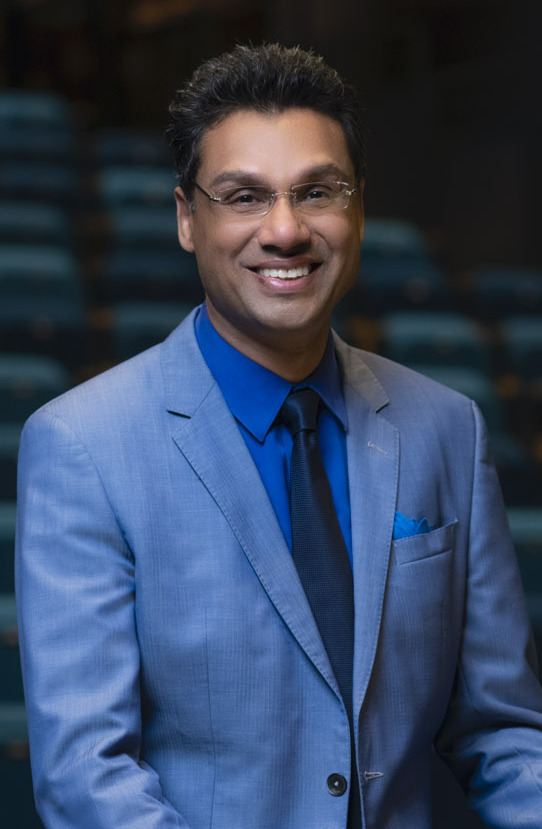
Nirmalya Kumar (MBA, 1991), professor and board member of various companies

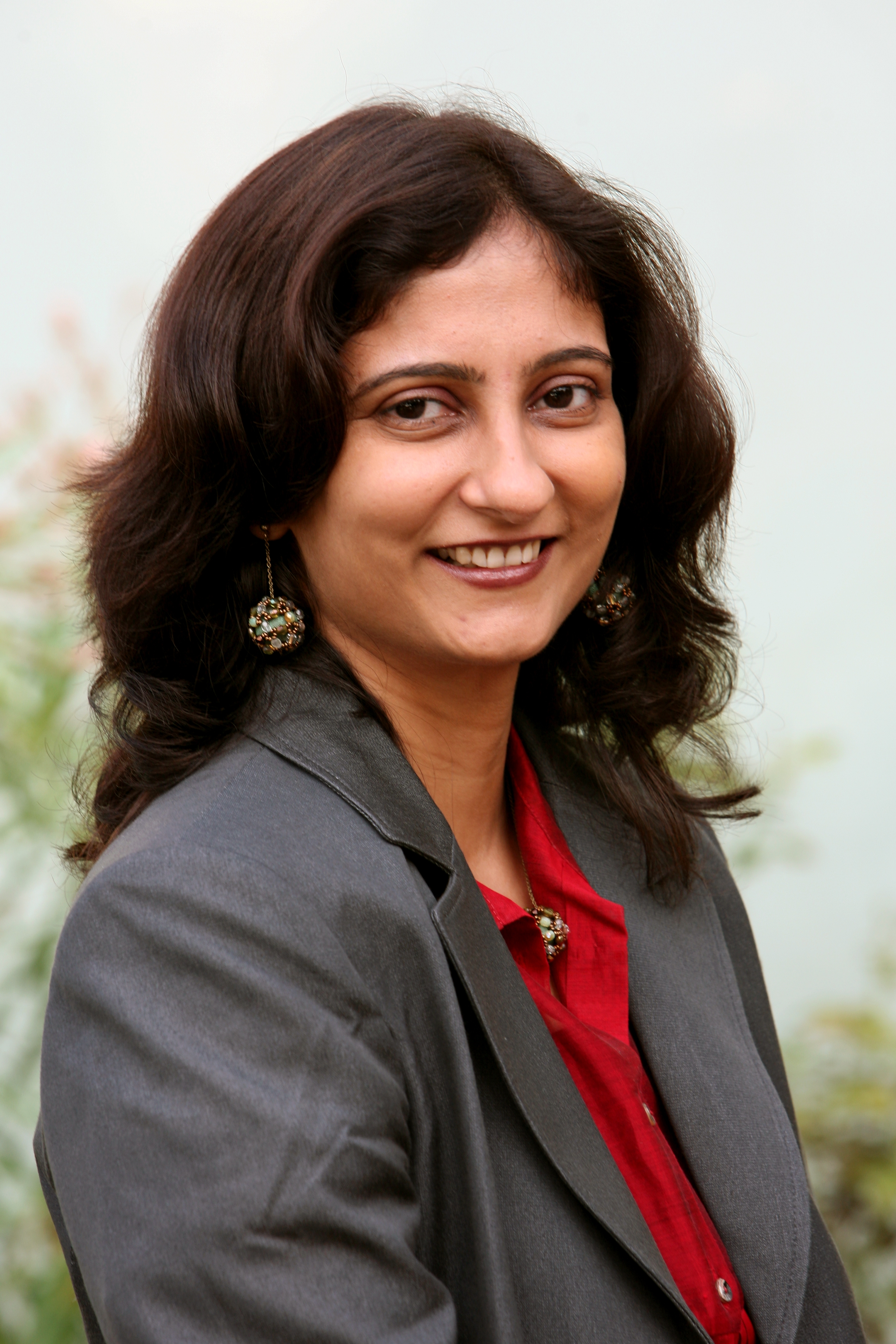
Anuradha Acharya (MS, MIS), CEO of Ocimum Bio Solutions and Mapmygenome

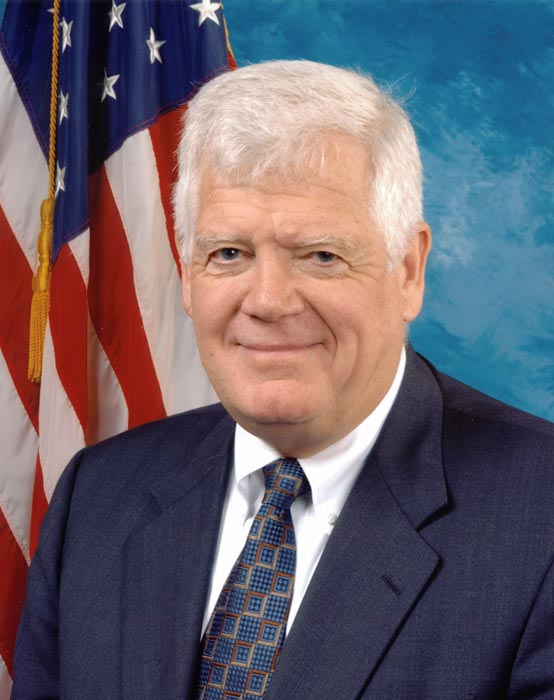
Jim McDermott, U.S. House of Representatives from Washington's 7th district

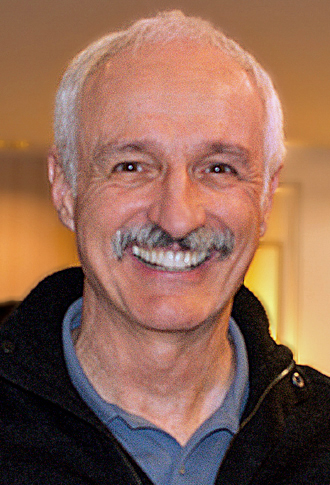
Michael Gross (BA), actor

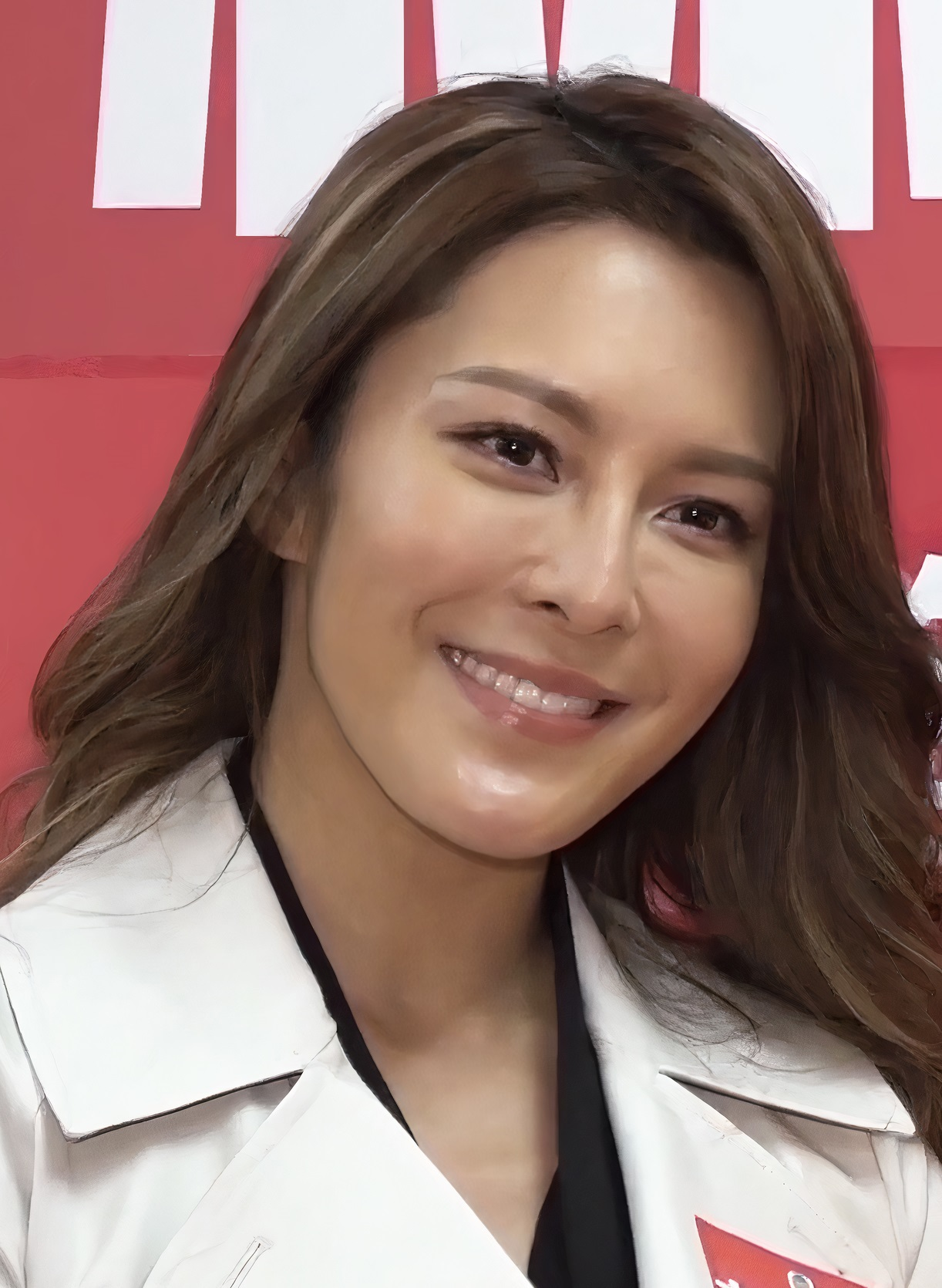
Kelly Cheung (BBA), winner of Miss Chinese International Pageant 2012 and represented Hong Kong at Miss World 2012

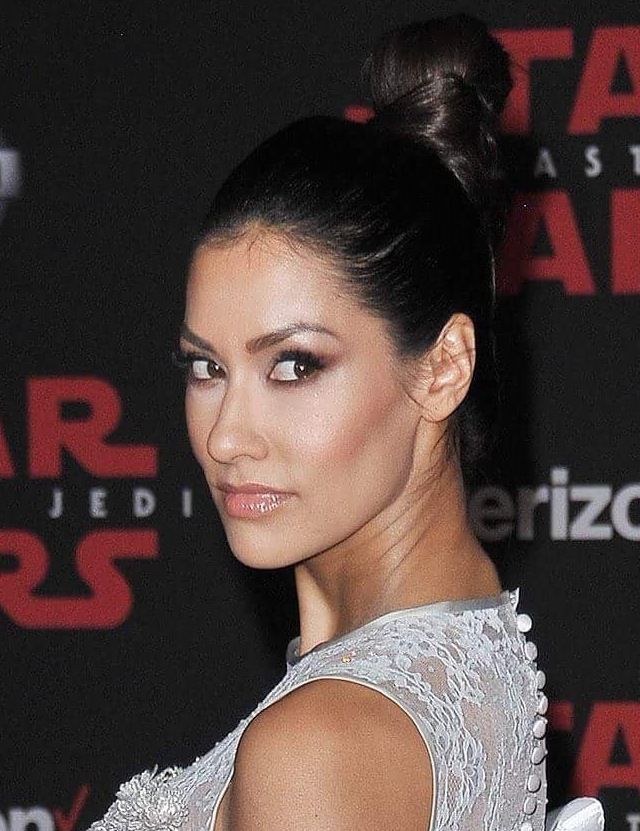
Janina Gavankar, actress and musician

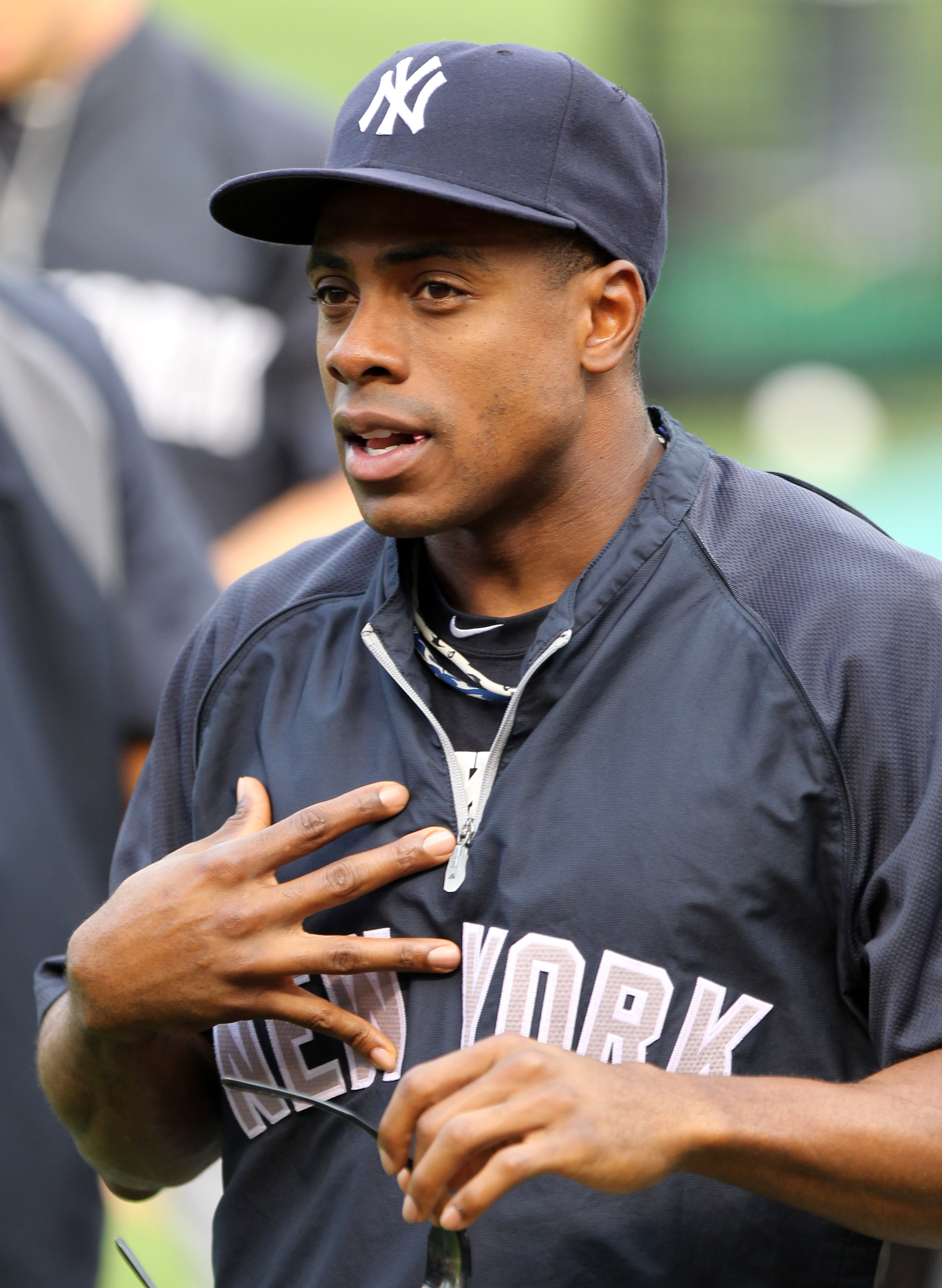
Curtis Granderson, three time MLB All-Star

== See also ==
- CASTp
