= Glycobiology (journal) =

- Discipline: Biochemistry, glycobiology
- Language: English
- Edited by: Karen Colley

Publication details
- History: 1990–present
- Publisher: Oxford University Press (United Kingdom)
- Frequency: Monthly
- Impact factor: 4.060 (2019)

Standard abbreviations
- ISO 4: Glycobiology

Indexing
- CODEN: GLYCE3
- ISSN: 0959-6658 (print); 1460-2423 (web)
- LCCN: 92642337
- OCLC no.: 23364007

Links
- Journal homepage; Online access; Online archive

Glycobiology is a monthly peer-reviewed scientific journal covering all aspects of the field of glycobiology and the official journal of the Society for Glycobiology. It is published by Oxford University Press. The journal was established in September 1990. It publishes primary research on the "biological functions of glycans, including glycoproteins, glycolipids, proteoglycans and free oligosaccharides, and on proteins that specifically interact with glycans."

== Abstracting and indexing ==
The journal is indexed in Index Medicus/PubMed/MEDLINE, Index Veterinarius, CAB Abstracts, Biological Abstracts, BIOSIS Previews, Current Contents/Life Sciences, ProQuest, Science Citation Index, and others. According to the Journal Citation Reports, its 2019 impact factor is 4.060, ranking it 102nd out of 297 journals in the category "Biochemistry & Molecular Biology".
