= List of chancellors of the University of Illinois Urbana-Champaign =

Chancellor of the University of Illinois Urbana-Champaign

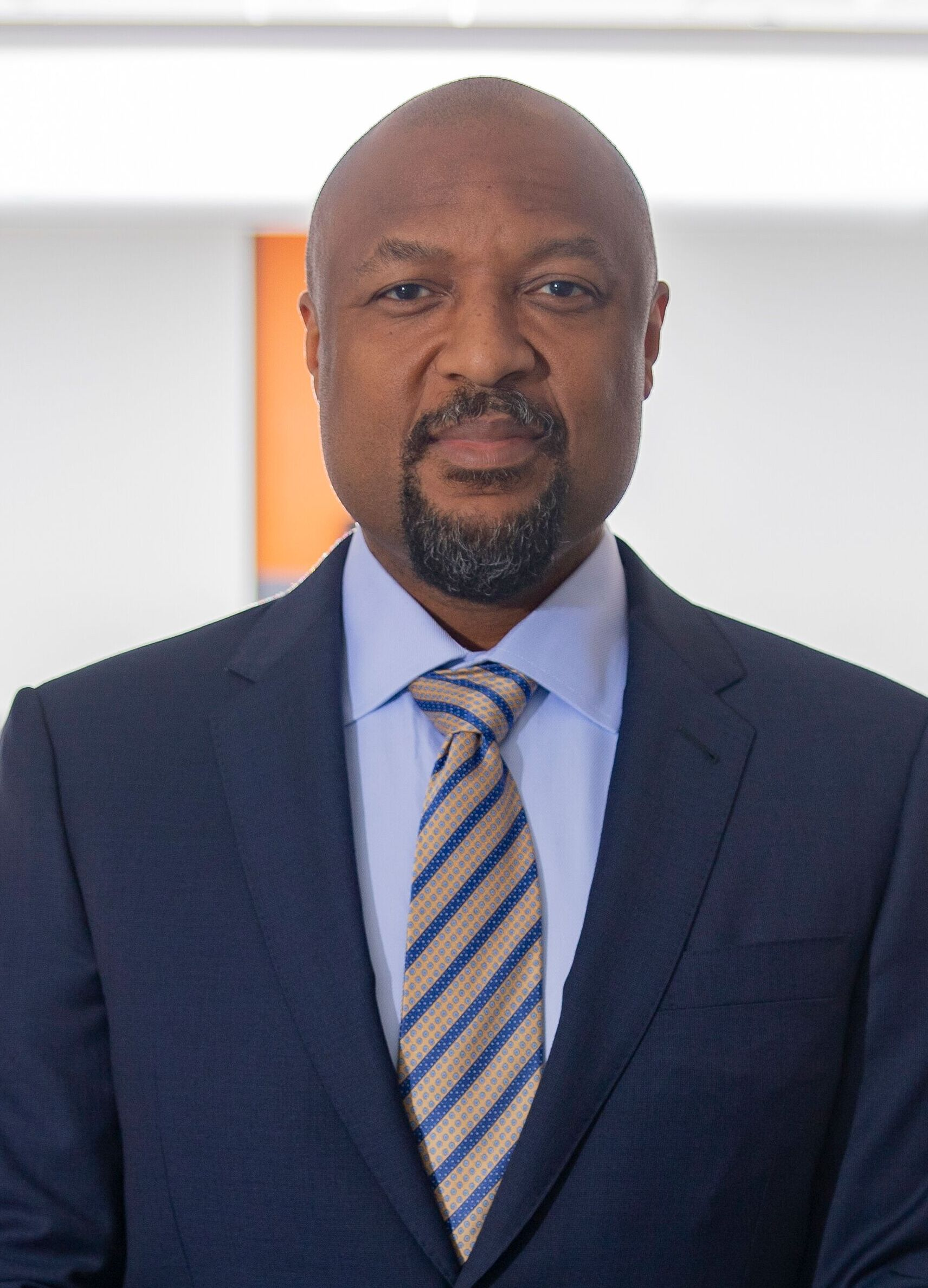
- Incumbent; Charles Lee Isbell Jr. since 1 August 2025
- Appointer: Board of Trustees (nominated by the president)
- Term length: One year
- Inaugural holder: Jack W. Peltason
- Formation: September 1, 1967 (59 years ago)
- Website: chancellor.illinois.edu

The chancellor of the University of Illinois Urbana-Champaign is the principal administrative officer of the university and a member of the faculty of each of its colleges, schools, institutes and divisions. The chancellor is appointed by the Board of Trustees following nomination by the president of the University of Illinois System. The chancellor performs those duties that are assigned by the president and that are consistent with the actions of the Board of Trustees. The chancellor is assisted by vice-chancellors for academic affairs, administrative affairs, campus affairs, and research. Jack W. Peltason served as the first chancellor in 1967, and there have been 13 chancellors in total. The current chancellor is Charles Lee Isbell Jr., who has held the position since 1 August 2025.

Before 1967, the president of the University of Illinois System served as the principal administrator of the original Urbana-Champaign campus. In June 1966, at the recommendation of president David D. Henry, the Board of Trustees switched to a chancellorship system of administration. The change established a new administrative office, the "Chancellor of the University of Illinois Urbana Champaign", and renamed the two administrators of the Chicago campuses, Vice president of the University of Illinois at the Medical Center (UIMC) and Vice president of the University of Illinois at Chicago Circle (UICC), to chancellor. The two Chicago campuses were later consolidated in 1982 to form the University of Illinois at Chicago.

== List of chancellors ==
List of chancellors
Chancellorship (Note: The University of Illinois Urbana-Champaign numbers its chancellors according to uninterrupted periods served by the same person, not including acting and interim presidents. Therefore, Charles Lee Isbell Jr. is numbered the 11th chancellor.)		Chancellor	Notes
1	1967–1977	Jack Peltason	
—N/a	1977 (acting)	Morton W. Weir	Vice Chancellor of Academic Affairs. Later served as 5th Chancellor.
2	1978–1979	William P. Gerberding	Left to serve as 27th President of the University of Washington.
3	1979–1984	John E. Cribbet	Hired as interim while Dean of the College of Law. Promoted to the permanent chancellorship in December. Resigned as a result of issues with the football program.
4	1984–1987	Thomas Eugene Everhart	
5	1987–1993	Morton W. Weir	Made interim again, then serving as Vice President of Academic Affairs for the University of Illinois System. Hiring was made permanent in 1988.
6	1993–2001	Michael Aiken	Was Provost of the University of Pennsylvania before hiring.
7	2001–2004	Nancy Cantor	Previously Provost of the University of Michigan. Left to assume Chancellorship of Syracuse University and later of Rutgers University-Newark. Was the first woman chancellor at all three institutions.
8	2004–2009	Richard Herman	Served as Provost from 1998 to 2004. Resigned along with President B. Joseph White as a result of the University of Illinois clout scandal.
—N/a	2009–2011 (interim)	Robert A. Easter	Previously Dean of College of Agricultural, Consumer and Environmental Sciences until appointed Interim Provost for a short time before taking the position of Interim Chancellor. In 2012, Easter was quickly hired as the 19th President of the University of Illinois.
9	2011–2015	Phyllis Wise	Served as Interim President of the University of Washington before hiring. Hired after the appointment of Michael Hogan (academic) as University President. Similar to Hogan's quick firing in 2012 after contentious emails and concerning behavior, Wise resigned in 2015 after her own litigious controversy as her scandalous emails were released.
—N/a	2015–2016 (interim)	Barbara J. Wilson	Dean of the College of Liberal Arts and Sciences. After interim term, was promoted to Vice President of the University of Illinois. Later hired as 22nd President of the University of Iowa in 2021.
10	2016–2025	Robert J. Jones	Previously 19th President of the University of Albany. First African American to serve in the position.
11	2025–present	Charles Lee Isbell Jr.	Previously provost and vice chancellor for academic affairs of the University of Wisconsin–Madison

== Timeline of chancellorships ==
Peltason (1967–77)
Weir (1977, 1987–93)
Gerberding (1978–79)
Cribbet (1979, 1979–84)
Everhart (1984–87)
Aiken (1993–2001)
Cantor (2001–04)
Herman (2004–09)
Easter (2009–11)
Wise (2011–15)
Wilson (2015–16)
Jones (2016–2025)
Isbell Jr. (2025–)
│
1967
│
1977
│
1987
│
1997
│
2007
│
2017
Chancellors of the University of Illinois Urbana-Champaign (1967–present)

== See also ==
- List of chancellors of the University of Illinois Chicago
- List of chancellors of the University of Illinois Springfield
- List of presidents of the University of Illinois system
