= List of chancellors of the University of Illinois Chicago =

Chancellor of the University of Illinois Chicago

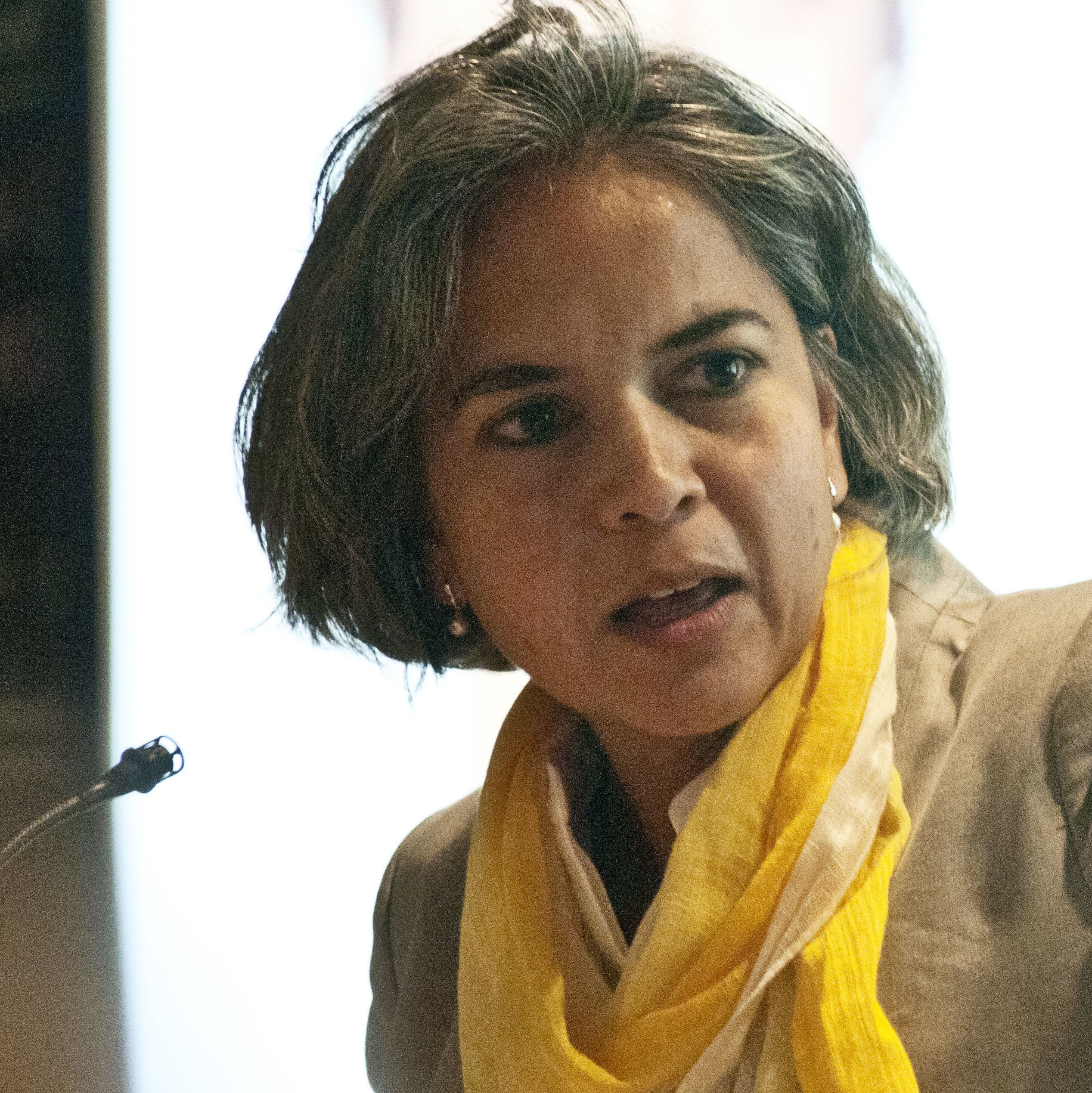
- Incumbent; Marie Lynn Miranda since July 2023
- Appointer: Board of Trustees (nominated by the president)
- Term length: One year
- Inaugural holder: Donald N. Langenberg
- Formation: September 1982 (44 years ago)
- Website: chancellor.uic.edu

The chancellor of the University of Illinois Chicago is the principal administrative officer of the university and a member of the faculty of each of its colleges, schools, institutes and divisions. The chancellor is appointed by the Board of Trustees following nomination by the president of the University of Illinois System. The chancellor performs those duties that are assigned by the president and that are consistent with the actions of the Board of Trustees. The chancellor is assisted by vice-chancellors for academic affairs, administrative affairs, campus affairs, and research. In September 1982, the University of Illinois System consolidated its two Chicago campuses, the University of Illinois at Chicago Circle and the University of Illinois at the Medical Center, to form the University of Illinois at Chicago. Donald N. Langenberg served as its first chancellor in 1983, and there have been 10 chancellors in total. The current chancellor is Dr. Marie Lynn Miranda, who has been serving since July 2023.

== List of chancellors ==
List of chancellors
Chancellorship		Chancellor	Notes
1	1983–1990	Donald N. Langenberg	Resigned to lead the University System of Maryland.
2	1990–1995	James J. Stukel	Resigned to become president of the University of Illinois System.
3	1995–1999	David C. Broski	
4	1999–2007	Sylvia Manning	
5	2008–2009 (interim)	Rick Gislason	
6	2009–2015	Paula Allen-Meares	
7	2015 (interim)	Rick Gislason	
8	2015–2022	Michael D. Amiridis	Resigned to lead the University of South Carolina.
9	2022–2023 (interim)	Javier Reyes	Resigned to lead University of Massachusetts Amherst.
10	2023–present	Marie Lynn Miranda	

== Timeline of chancellorships ==
Langenberg (1983–1990)
Stukel* (1990–1991)
Stukel (1991–1995)
Broski* (1995–1996)
Broski (1996–1999)
Manning* (1999–2000)
Manning (2000–2007)
Gislason* (2008–2009)
Allen-Meares (2009–2015)
Gislason* (2015)
Amiridis (2015–)
│
1983
│
1992
│
2001
│
2010
│
2019
Chancellors of the University of Illinois Chicago (1983–Present)
*Interim/acting chancellor

== See also ==
- List of chancellors of the University of Illinois Springfield
- List of chancellors of the University of Illinois Urbana-Champaign
- List of presidents of the University of Illinois system
