= Charles Lee Isbell Jr. =

American computationalist, researcher, administrator, and educator

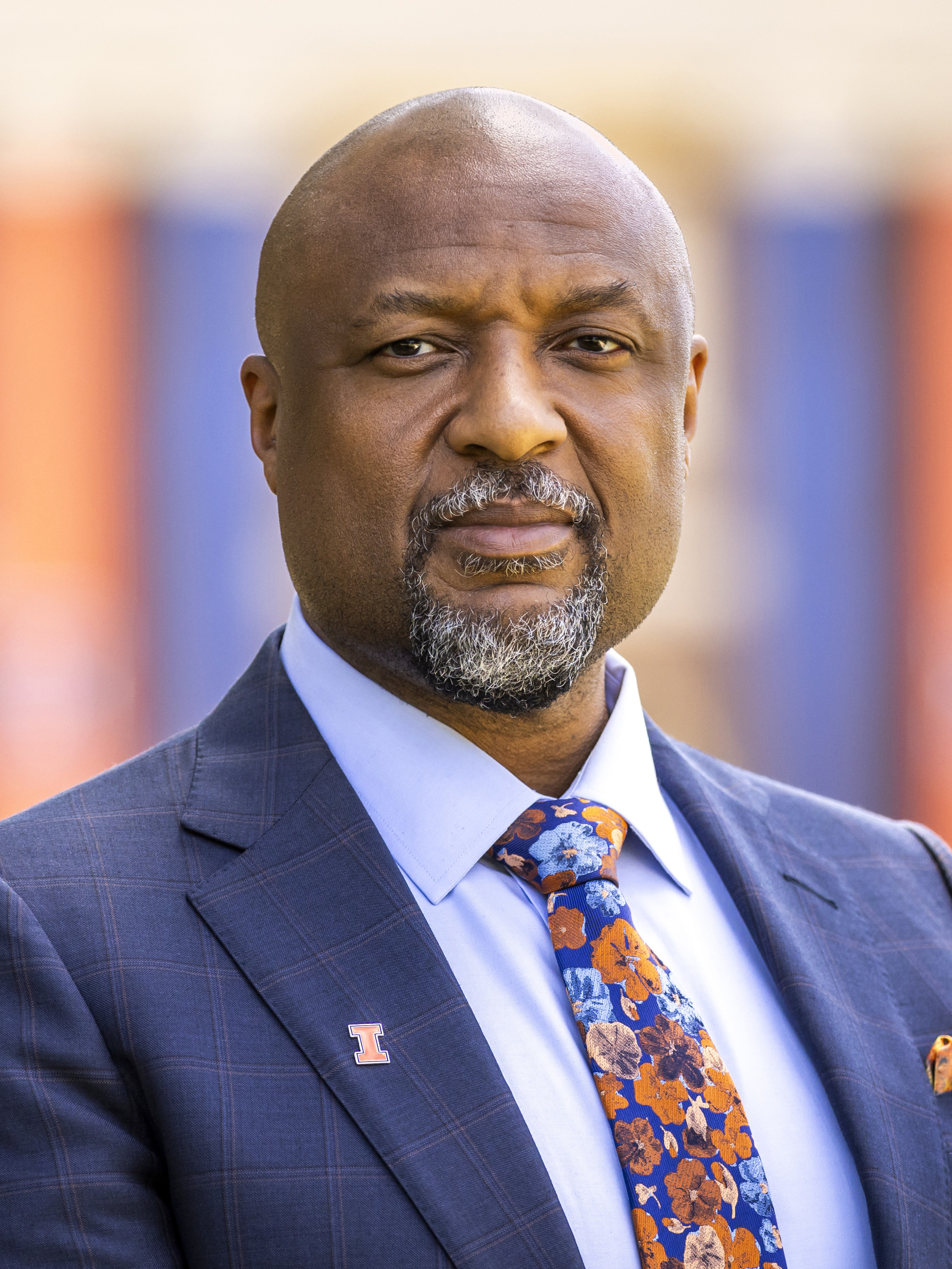
- Official portrait, 2025

11th Chancellor of the University of Illinois Urbana-Champaign
- Incumbent
- Assumed office August 1, 2025
- Preceded by: Robert J. Jones

Provost of the University of Wisconsin–Madison
- In office 2023 – June 2025
- Chancellor: Jennifer Mnookin
- Preceded by: Karl Scholz
- Succeeded by: John Zumbrunnen

Personal details
- Born: December 18, 1968 (age 57) Chattanooga, Tennessee, U.S.
- Education: Georgia Institute of Technology (BS); Massachusetts Institute of Technology (PhD)
- Scientific career
- Fields: Computer science
- Workplaces: Georgia Tech; AT&T; University of Wisconsin; University of Illinois Urbana-Champaign
- Thesis: Sparse Multi-Level Representations for Text Retrieval (1998)
- Doctoral advisor: Rodney Brooks; Paul Viola

Charles Lee Isbell Jr. (born December 18, 1968) is an American computer scientist who has been the 11th chancellor of the University of Illinois Urbana-Champaign since August 2025.

Isbell joined the faculty of the Georgia Institute of Technology College of Computing in 2002 and served as the dean of the College of Computing from July 2019 to July 2023. He served as provost and vice chancellor for academic affairs at the University of Wisconsin–Madison from August 2023 to June 2025.

Isbell's research interests focus on machine learning and artificial intelligence, particularly interactive and human-centered AI. He has published about 100 scientific papers.

== Early life and education ==
Isbell earned his Bachelor of Science degree with a major in information and computer science in 1990 from the Georgia Institute of Technology, where he was named its outstanding student by the president as a part of Georgia's Annual Academic Recognition Day. Awarded a fellowship from AT&T Bell Labs as well as an NSF fellowship, he continued his education at the MIT Computer Science and Artificial Intelligence Laboratory. There, he pursued research in artificial intelligence and machine learning as well as introducing what may have been the first on-line Black History Database.

After receiving a PhD from the Massachusetts Institute of Technology in 1998, Isbell joined AT&T Labs – Research. In the fall of 2002, he returned to Georgia Tech to join the faculty of the College of Computing. In Summer 2023, he began as Provost at the University of Wisconsin.

== Career ==
At Georgia Tech, Isbell pursued reform in computing education. He received an award in 2006 for his work on Threads, Georgia Tech's structuring principle for computing curricula. He was also awarded in 2014 for being an architect of the Georgia Tech Online Master of Science in Computer Science, a MOOC-supported degree program that has received international attention and was the first of its kind. Isbell testified before Congress on the topic. In 2008, Isbell became an associate dean of the college. Four years later in 2012, he became the senior associate dean, and in 2017, he became the executive associate dean.

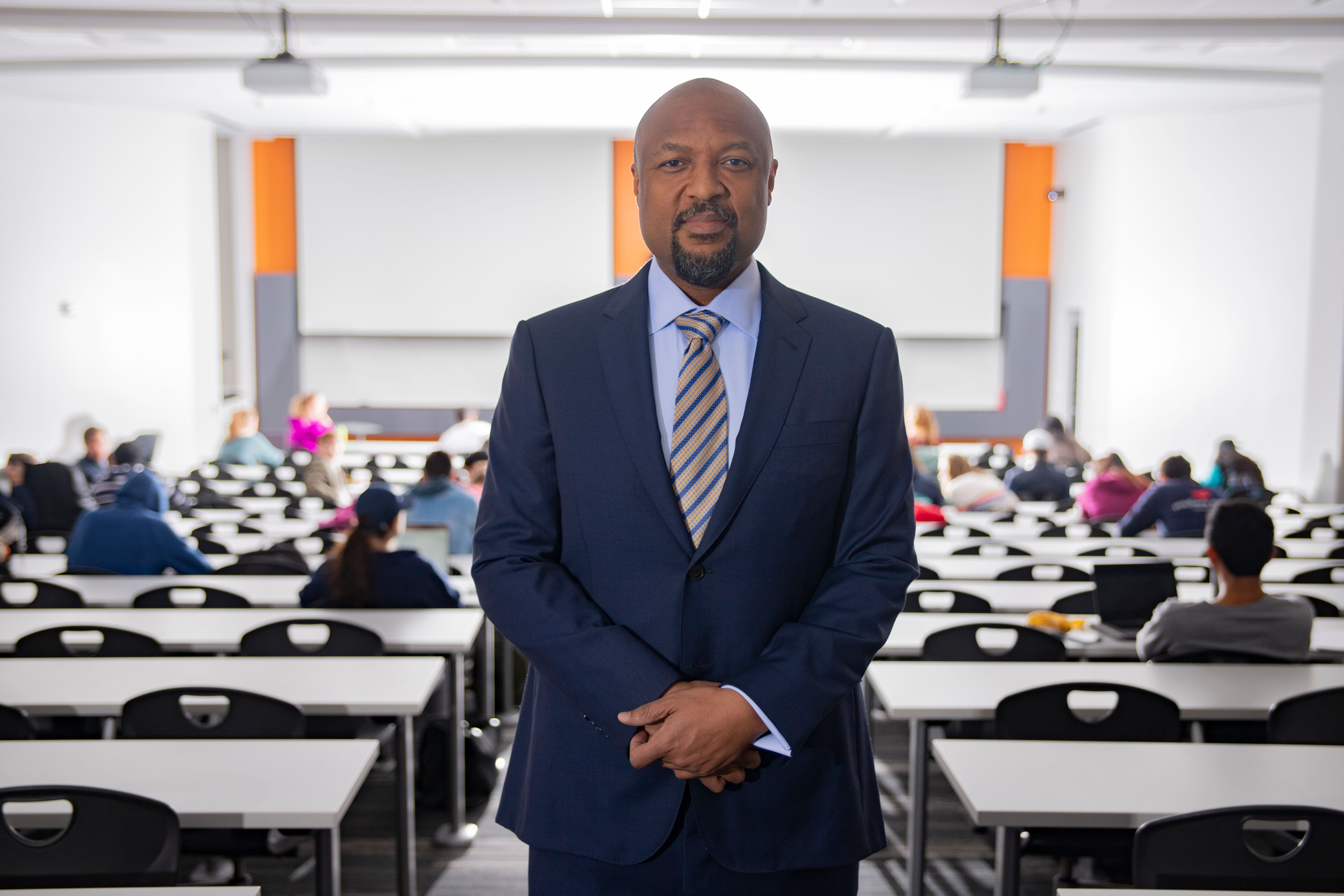
Isbell at Georgia Tech

As a professor and administrator, he continued to focus on issues of broadening participation in computing. Isbell is the founding executive director for the Constellations Center for Education in Computing.

In April 2019, it was announced that Isbell would succeed Zvi Galil as dean of the Georgia Tech College of Computing, a position he took up in July 2019 and continued in until July 2023. On May 1, 2023, it was announced that Isbell would succeed Karl Scholz as provost of the University of Wisconsin-Madison, a position he took up August 1, 2023. Isbell began as chancellor of the University of Illinois Urbana-Champaign on August 1, 2025.

== Awards and honors ==
Isbell has won two "best paper" awards for technical contributions in artificial intelligence and machine learning; has been named a National Academy of Sciences Kavli Fellow.

Isbell was inducted as a fellow of the Association for Computing Machinery in 2018, with the citation: "For contributions to interactive machine learning; and for contributions to increasing access and diversity in computing". He was also inducted as a fellow of the Association for the Advancement of Artificial Intelligence in 2019, with the citation: "For significant contributions to the field of interactive machine learning, computing education, and for increasing access and diversity in computing." He was also elected as a member of the American Academy of Arts and Sciences in 2021.
