= Rotonda =

Rotonda can refer to:

- Rotonda, Florida
- Rotonda, Basilicata
- Villa Capra "La Rotonda", a building in Vicenza, Italy
- Rotunda (alternative spelling)
- The Rotonda Condominium in McLean, Virginia
- A term used by some Spanish-speaking or Spanish-influenced countries for a roundabout
- Rotonda (EP), 2017 EP by Gloc-9
  - "Rotonda", a song on the EP Rotonda
- "Rotonda (Thasup and Tiziano Ferro song)", a 2022 Italian song, stylized as "R()t()onda"
