= List of chancellors of the University of Illinois Springfield =

Chancellor of the University of Illinois Springfield
- Incumbent; Janet L. Gooch since July 1, 2022
- Appointer: Board of Trustees (nominated by the president)
- Term length: One year
- Inaugural holder: Naomi B. Lynn
- Formation: July 1, 1995 (31 years ago)
- Website: www.uis.edu/chancellor

The chancellor of the University of Illinois Springfield is the principal administrative officer of the university and a member of the faculty of each of its colleges, schools, institutes and divisions. The chancellor is appointed by the Board of Trustees following nomination by the president of the University of Illinois System. The chancellor performs those duties that are assigned by the president and that are consistent with the actions of the board of trustees. The chancellor is assisted by vice-chancellors for academic affairs, administrative affairs, campus affairs, and research. Naomi B. Lynn served as the first chancellor in 1995, and there have been 5 chancellors in total. The current chancellor is Janet L. Gooch, who has held the position since July 1, 2022.

On February 28, 1995, Governor Jim Edgar signed a bill reorganizing higher education in Illinois, which in the process abolished the Board of Regents of Sangamon State University (SSU) and merged SSU with the University of Illinois System. On July 1, SSU officially became the University of Illinois Springfield. Naomi B. Lynn, the last president of SSU, continued as the new university's first chancellor.

== List of chancellors ==
List of chancellors
Chancellorship (Note: According to an old university webpage, the University of Illinois Springfield numbers its chancellors according to uninterrupted periods served by the same person, not including interim roles. Harry J. Berman is not counted as a chancellor on this webpage.)		Chancellor	Notes
1	1995–2001	Naomi B. Lynn	Lynn was previously the president of Sangamon State University before its integration into the University of Illinois System.
2	2001–2010	Richard D. Ringeisen	Ringeisen was previously vice chancellor for academic affairs and chief academic officer at East Carolina University.
—N/a	2010–2011 (interim)	Harry J. Berman (Note: Provost and vice chancellor for academic affairs)	Berman was previously the provost and vice chancellor for academic affairs at the University of Illinois Springfield.
3	2011–2020	Susan J. Koch	Koch was previously the provost and vice president for academic affairs at Northern Michigan University.
—N/a	2020–2022 (interim)	Karen M. Whitney (Note: Retired academic leader from academic institutions in Pennsylvania.)	
4	2022–present	Janet L. Gooch	Gooch was previously the executive vice president and provost at Truman State University.

== Timeline of chancellorships ==
Lynn (1995–2001)
Ringeisen (2001–2010)
Berman (2010–2011)
Koch (2011–2020)
Whitney* (2020–2022)
Gooch (2022–Present)
│
1995
│
2002
│
2009
│
2016
│
2023
Chancellors of the University of Illinois Springfield (1995–Present)
*Interim/acting chancellor

== See also ==
- List of chancellors of the University of Illinois Chicago
- List of chancellors of the University of Illinois Urbana-Champaign
- List of presidents of the University of Illinois system
