= Rotunda (disambiguation) =

Rotunda refers to any building with a circular ground plan, often covered by a dome. Rotunda or The Rotunda may also refer to:

- Rotunda (geometry), a family of dihedral-symmetric polyhedra with alternating pentagons and triangles around an axis
- United States Capitol rotunda, in Washington, D.C.

== Places ==
=== Czech Republic ===
- Rotunda of Saint Catherine in Znojmo

=== Greece ===
- Arch of Galerius and Rotunda, Rotunda of St. George, built in Thessaloniki in 306 AD

=== Ireland ===
- Rotunda Hospital, Dublin

=== Malta ===
- Rotunda of Mosta, in Mosta

=== Moldova ===
- Rotunda, Edineț, a commune in Edineţ District

=== Romania ===
- Rotunda, Olt, a commune in Olt County
- Rotunda, a village in Corbeni Commune, Argeș County
- Rotunda, a village in Buza Commune, Cluj County
- Rotunda, a village in Doljești Commune, Neamț County
- Rotunda, a village administered by Liteni town, Suceava County
- Rotunda, a tributary of the Bistrița in Suceava County
- Rotunda (Lăpuș), a tributary of the Lăpuș in Maramureș County

=== United Kingdom ===
- Rotunda, Birmingham, a cylindrical highrise building in Birmingham
- Rotunda, Woolwich, a John Nash building in Woolwich, London
- Blackfriars Rotunda (1787–1958), a building in Southwark
- The Rotunda at Ranelagh Gardens, London, a former fashionable social meeting place and function room
- Rotunda Museum, a museum of geology in Scarborough, North Yorkshire, England
- Glasgow Harbour Tunnel Rotundas, flanking the River Clyde in Scotland
- Rotunda, Aldershot, a former Methodist church in Aldershot, Hampshire

=== United States ===
- The Rotunda (Baltimore), a mixed-use property in northern Baltimore, Maryland
- The Rotunda (Hermann, Missouri), listed on the NRHP in Missouri
- The Rotunda (New York City), a building in Manhattan 1818–1870
- The Rotunda (University of Virginia)
- The Rotunda (Longwood University)
- D'Alemberte Rotunda, on the campus of Florida State University
- Ford Rotunda, a former tourist attraction in Dearborn, Michigan

== Music ==
- "Rotunda", a song on the 1977 album Inner Voices, by McCoy Tyner
- "Rotunda", a 2011 single by Markus Schulz
- "Rotunda", a 1970 song by Tom Rush on the album Wrong End of the Rainbow
- "Rotunda", a 1996 song by Joe Morris from Elsewhere

== People ==
- Kyndra Rotunda (born 1973), American legal academic
- Ronald Rotunda (1945–2018), American legal academic
- Mike Rotunda (born 1958), American professional wrestler
- Bray Wyatt (Windham Rotunda; 1987–2023), American professional wrestler and son of Mike Rotunda
- Bo Dallas (Taylor Rotunda; born 1990), American professional wrestler and son of Mike Rotunda

== Other uses ==
- Rotunda (script), a specific medieval blackletter script
- Rotunda radicals, or Rotundists, London radical reformers who gathered around the Blackfriars Rotunda in the 1830s
- A localized term for a traffic roundabout
