= Ronald Rotunda =

American legal scholar

Ronald D. Rotunda
- Born: February 14, 1945; Blue Island, Illinois
- Died: March 14, 2018 (aged 73); Orange, California
- Occupation: Law professor

Ronald D. Rotunda (February 14, 1945 – March 14, 2018) was an American legal scholar and professor of law at Chapman University School of Law. Rotunda's first area of primary expertise is United States Constitutional law, and is the author of an influential 6-volume legal treatise on Constitutional Law. His other area of primary expertise is Legal Ethics, often called Professional Responsibility. He has also published an influential treatise on Legal Ethics, co-published by West-Thomson Reuters, ABA. He was also a senior fellow, in 2000, at the Cato Institute in Washington, D.C. In 1963, when Rotunda was 18 years old, he received a scholarship to attend Harvard University. Professor Rotunda later received a J.D. from Harvard Law School.

Rotunda married Marcia Mainland, a law school classmate, in June 1969. They were married for 28 years and had two children. They were divorced in 1997. Marcia Rotunda was an attorney in the Office of University Counsel at the University of Illinois from 1986 to 2007.

In 1966, shortly after his conviction, Albert DeSalvo, the supposed Boston Strangler, was one of Rotunda's students in a law course for prisoners. In an article about this experience, Rotunda described DeSalvo as charming, helpful, and well-groomed in contrast to every other student at the prison.

Rotunda was Albert E. Jenner Jr. Professor of Law at the University of Illinois College of Law. He was employed there for twenty-five years. He served as an advisor to Ken Starr during Starr's tenure as special prosecutor during the Clinton Administration. Previously, he had served on the investigative team during the Watergate scandal.

As an advisor to the Independent Counsel in 1998, Rotunda was asked for an opinion on "whether a sitting President is subject to indictment."

In a 56-page response released by the National Archives following a Freedom of Information Act request by The New York Times, Rotunda concluded, "It is proper, constitutional, and legal for a federal grand jury to indict a sitting President for serious criminal acts that are not part of, and are contrary to, the President's official duties. In this country, no one, even President Clinton, is above the law."

He was later married to Kyndra Rotunda (and divorced in 2014). The Rotundas were on faculty at George Mason University School of Law until departing in 2008 for Chapman University.

Professor Rotunda died on March 14, 2018. A few weeks before his death, his final work, a one-volume abridged edition of Beveridge’s original early 20th century, 4 volume series on the life of John Marshall, was published.

== Publications ==
- The Politics of Language: Liberalism as Word and Symbol Intro. by Daniel Schorr. (1986)
- California Supplement to Problems and Materials on Professional Responsibility (Foundation Press, Mineola, N.Y., 1976) (with Thomas D. Morgan).
- 1978 Supplement to Problems and Materials on Professional Responsibility (Foundation Press, Mineola, N.Y., 1978) (with Thomas D. Morgan).
- 1979 Problems, Cases and Readings Supplement to Problems and Materials on Professional Responsibility (Foundation Press, Mineola, N.Y., 1979) (with Thomas D. Morgan).
- 1979 California Rules Supplement to Problems and Materials on Professional Responsibility (Foundation Press, Mineola, N.Y., 1979) (with Thomas D. Morgan).
- 1979 Standards Supplement to Problems and Materials on Professional Responsibility (Foundation Press, Mineola, N.Y., 1979) (with Thomas D. Morgan).
- 1980 California Rules Supplement to Problems and Materials on Professional Responsibility (Foundation Press, Mineola, N.Y., 1980) (with Thomas D. Morgan).
- 1980 Standards Supplement to Problems and Materials on Professional Responsibility (Foundation Press, Mineola, N.Y., 1980) (with Thomas D. Morgan).
- Constitutional Law (West Publishing Co., St. Paul, Minnesota, 1978) (a one-volume treatise on Constitutional Law) (with John E. Nowak and J. Nelson Young).
- 1978 Supplement to Constitutional Law (West Publishing Co., St. Paul, Minnesota, 1978) (with John E. Nowak and J. Nelson Young).
- 1979-1980 Supplement to Constitutional Law (West Publishing Co., St. Paul, Minnesota, 1979) (with John E. Nowak and J. Nelson Young).
- 1982 Supplement to Constitutional Law (West Publishing Co., St. Paul, Minnesota, 1982) (with John E. Nowak and J. Nelson Young).
- Modern Constitutional Law: Cases & Notes (West Publishing Co., St. Paul, Minnesota, 1981).
- 1981 Supplement to Modern Constitutional Law (West Publishing Co., St. Paul, Minnesota, 1981).
- 1982 Supplement to Modern Constitutional Law (West Publishing Co., St. Paul, Minnesota, 1982).
- 1983 Supplement to Modern Constitutional Law (West Publishing Co., St. Paul, Minnesota, 1983).
- 1984 Supplement to Modern Constitutional Law (West Publishing Co., St. Paul, Minnesota, 1984).
- Problems and Materials on Professional Responsibility (Foundation Press, Mineola, N.Y., 2d ed. 1981) (with Thomas D. Morgan).
- 1981 Standards Supplement to Problems and Materials on Professional Responsibility (Foundation Press, Mineola, N.Y., 1981) (with Thomas D. Morgan).
- 1983 Standards Supplement to Problems and Materials on Professional Responsibility (Foundation Press, Mineola, N.Y., 1983) (with Thomas D. Morgan).
- The United States Federal System: Legal Integration in the American Experience (Giuffrè, Milan, 1982) (with Peter Hay).
- Six Justices on Civil Rights (Oceana Publications, Inc., Dobbs Ferry, N.Y., 1983) (edited and with introduction).
- Constitutional Law (West Publishing Co., St. Paul, Minnesota, 2d ed. 1983) (with John E. Nowak and J. Nelson Young) (a one-volume treatise on Constitutional Law).
- Professional Responsibility (West Publishing Co., 1984, Black Letter Series).
- Problems and Materials on Professional Responsibility (Foundation Press, Mineola, N.Y., 3d ed. 1984) (with Thomas D. Morgan).
- 1984 Selected Standards on Professional Responsibility (Foundation Press, Mineola, N.Y. 1984) (with Thomas D. Morgan).
- 1985 Selected Standards on Professional Responsibility (Foundation Press, Mineola, N.Y. 1985) (with Thomas D. Morgan).
- 1986 Selected Standards on Professional Responsibility (Foundation Press, Mineola, N.Y. 1986) (with Thomas D. Morgan).
- 1987 Selected Standards on Professional Responsibility (Foundation Press, Mineola, N.Y. 1987) (with Thomas D. Morgan).
- Modern Constitutional Law: Cases & Notes (West Publishing Co., St. Paul, Minnesota, 2d ed. 1985).
- 1985 Supplement to Modern Constitutional Law (West Publishing Co., St. Paul, Minnesota, 1985).
- 1986 Supplement to Modern Constitutional Law (West Publishing Co., St. Paul, Minnesota, 1986).
- 1987 Supplement to Modern Constitutional Law (West Publishing Co., St. Paul, Minnesota, 1987).
- 1988 Supplement to Modern Constitutional Law (West Publishing Co., St. Paul, Minnesota, 1988).
- The Politics of Language: Liberalism as Word and Symbol (University of Iowa Press, 1986) (with an Introduction by Daniel Schorr) [Reviews].
- Treatise on Constitutional Law: Substance and Procedure (West Publishing Co., St. Paul, Minnesota, 1986) (three-volume treatise) (with John E. Nowak and J. Nelson Young).
- 1987 Pocket Part to Treatise on Constitutional Law (West Publishing Co., 1987) (with John E. Nowak).
- 1988 Pocket Part to Treatise on Constitutional Law (West Publishing Co., 1988) (with John E. Nowak).
- 1989 Pocket Part to Treatise on Constitutional Law (West Publishing Co., 1989) (with John E. Nowak).
- 1990 Pocket Part to Treatise on Constitutional Law (West Publishing Co., 1990) (with John E. Nowak).
- 1991 Pocket Part to Treatise on Constitutional Law (West Publishing Co., 1991) (with John E. Nowak).
- Constitutional Law (West Publishing Co., St. Paul, Minnesota, 3d ed. 1986) (a one-volume treatise on Constitutional Law) (with John E. Nowak and J. Nelson Young).
- 1988 Pocket Part to Constitutional Law (West Publishing Co., 1988) (with John E. Nowak).
- Joseph Story's Commentaries on the Constitution (Carolina Academic Press, Durham, N.C. 1987) (with introduction) (with John E. Nowak).
- Constitutional Law: Principles and Cases (West Publishing Co., St. Paul, Minnesota, 1987).
- Problems and Materials on Professional Responsibility (Foundation Press, Mineola, N.Y., 4th ed. 1987) (with Thomas D. Morgan).
- 1988 Selected Standards on Professional Responsibility (Foundation Press, Mineola, N.Y. 1988) (with Thomas D. Morgan).
- 1989 Selected Standards on Professional Responsibility (Foundation Press, Westbury, N.Y. 1989) (with Thomas D. Morgan).
- 1990 Selected Standards on Professional Responsibility (Foundation Press, Westbury, N.Y. 1990) (with Thomas D. Morgan).
- Professional Responsibility (West Publishing Co., St. Paul, Minnesota, 2d ed. 1988, Black Letter Series).
- Modern Constitutional Law: Cases and Notes (West Publishing Co., St. Paul, Minnesota, 3d ed. 1989).
- 1989 Supplement to Modern Constitutional Law (West Publishing Co., St. Paul, Minnesota, 1989).
- 1990 Supplement to Modern Constitutional Law (West Publishing Co., St. Paul, Minnesota, 1990).
- 1991 Supplement to Modern Constitutional Law (West Publishing Co., St. Paul, Minnesota, 1991).
- 1992 Supplement to Modern Constitutional Law (West Publishing Co., St. Paul, Minnesota, 1992).
- Problems and Materials on Professional Responsibility (Foundation Press, Westbury, N.Y., 5th ed. 1991) (with Thomas D. Morgan).
- 1991 Selected Standards on Professional Responsibility (Foundation Press, Westbury, N.Y. 1991) (with Thomas D. Morgan).
- 1992 Selected Standards on Professional Responsibility (Foundation Press, Westbury, N.Y. 1992) (with Thomas D. Morgan).
- 1993 Selected Standards on Professional Responsibility (Foundation Press, Westbury, N.Y. 1993) (with Thomas D. Morgan).
- 1994 Selected Standards on Professional Responsibility (Foundation Press, Westbury, N.Y. 1994) (with Thomas D. Morgan).
- 1995 Selected Standards on Professional Responsibility (Foundation Press, Westbury, N.Y. 1995) (with Thomas D. Morgan).
- Constitutional Law (West Publishing Co., St. Paul, Minnesota, 4th ed. 1991) (a one-volume treatise on Constitutional Law) (with John E. Nowak).
- Professional Responsibility (West Publishing Co., St. Paul, Minnesota, 3d ed. 1992, Black Letter Series).
- Treatise on Constitutional Law: Substance and Procedure (West Publishing Co., St. Paul, Minnesota, 2d ed. 1992) (four-volume treatise) (with John E. Nowak).
- 1993 Pocket Part to Constitutional Law (West Publishing Co., St. Paul, Minnesota, 1993) (with John E. Nowak).
- 1994 Pocket Part to Constitutional Law (West Publishing Co., St. Paul, Minnesota, 1994) (with John E. Nowak).
- 1995 Pocket Part to Constitutional Law (West Publishing Co., St. Paul, Minnesota, 1995) (with John E. Nowak).
- 1996 Pocket Part to Constitutional Law (West Publishing Co., St. Paul, Minnesota, 1996) (with John E. Nowak).
- 1997 Pocket Part to Constitutional Law (West Publishing Co., St. Paul, Minnesota, 1997) (with John E. Nowak).
- 1998 Pocket Part to Constitutional Law (West Publishing Co., St. Paul, Minnesota, 1998) (with John E. Nowak).
- 1999 Pocket Part to Constitutional Law (West Group, St. Paul, Minnesota, 1999) (with John E. Nowak).
- Modern Constitutional Law: Cases and Notes (West Publishing Co., St. Paul, Minnesota, 4th ed. 1993).
- 1993 Supplement to Modern Constitutional Law (West Publishing Co., St. Paul, Minnesota, 1993).
- 1994 SUPPLEMENT to Modern Constitutional Law (West Publishing Co., St. Paul, Minnesota, 1994).
- 1995 Supplement to Modern Constitutional Law (West Publishing Co., St. Paul, Minnesota, 1995).
- 1996 Supplement to Modern Constitutional Law (West Publishing Co., St. Paul, Minnesota, 1996).
- Constitutional Law (West Publishing Co., St. Paul, Minnesota, 5th ed. 1995) (a one-volume treatise on Constitutional Law) (with John E. Nowak).
- Problems and Materials on Professional Responsibility (Foundation Press, Westbury, N.Y., 6th ed. 1995) (with Thomas D. Morgan).
- 1996 Selected Standards on Professional Responsibility (Foundation Press, Westbury, N.Y. 1996) (with Thomas D. Morgan).
- 1997 Selected Standards on Professional Responsibility (Foundation Press, Westbury, N.Y. 1997) (with Thomas D. Morgan).
- 1998 Selected Standards on Professional Responsibility (Foundation Press, Westbury, N.Y. 1998) (with Thomas D. Morgan).
- 1999 Selected Standards on Professional Responsibility (Foundation Press, New York, N.Y. 1999) (with Thomas D. Morgan).
- 2000 Selected Standards on Professional Responsibility (Foundation Press, New York, N.Y. 2000) (with Thomas D. Morgan).
- Professional Responsibility (West Publishing Co., St. Paul, Minnesota, 4th ed. 1995, Black Letter Series) (with computer disk).
- Treatise on Constitutional Law: Substance and Procedure — Expanded CD Rom Edition (West Publishing Co., St. Paul, Minnesota, 1995) (with John E. Nowak).
- Modern Constitutional Law: Cases and Notes (West Publishing Co., St. Paul, Minnesota, 5th ed. 1997).
- 1997 Supplement to Modern Constitutional Law (West Publishing Co., St. Paul, Minnesota, 1997).
- 1998 Supplement to Modern Constitutional Law (West Publishing Co., St. Paul, Minnesota, 1998).
- 1999 Supplement to Modern Constitutional Law (West Publishing Co., St. Paul, Minnesota, 1999).
- Treatise on Constitutional Law: Substance and Procedure (West Group, St. Paul, Minnesota, 3d ed. 1999) (five-volume treatise) (with John E. Nowak).
- 2000 Pocket Part to Treatise on Constitutional Law: Substance and Procedure (West Group, St. Paul, Minnesota, 2000) (with John E. Nowak).
- 2001 Pocket Part to Treatise on Constitutional Law: Substance and Procedure (West Group, St. Paul, Minnesota, 2001) (with John E. Nowak).
- 2002 Pocket Part to Treatise on Constitutional Law: Substance and Procedure (West Group, St. Paul, Minnesota, 2002) (with John E. Nowak).
- 2003 Pocket Part to Treatise on Constitutional Law: Substance and Procedure (West Group, St. Paul, Minnesota, 2003) (with John E. Nowak).
- 2004 Pocket Part to Treatise on Constitutional Law: Substance and Procedure (West Group, St. Paul, Minnesota, 2004) (with John E. Nowak).
- 2005 Pocket Part to Treatise on Constitutional Law: Substance and Procedure (West Group, St. Paul, Minnesota, 2005) (with John E. Nowak).
- 2006 Pocket Part to Treatise on Constitutional Law: Substance and Procedure (West Group, St. Paul, Minnesota, 2006) (with John E. Nowak).
- 헌법: 개인의 자유와 절차를 [American Constitutional Law: Individual Liberties and Procedure (published in Korean) (Korean Constitutional Court, 1999) (with John E. Nowak).
- Problems and Materials on Professional Responsibility (Foundation Press, Westbury, NY, 7th ed. 2000) (with Thomas D. Morgan).
- 2001 Selected Standards on Professional Responsibility (Foundation Press, New York, N.Y. 2001) (with Thomas D. Morgan).
- 2002 Selected Standards on Professional Responsibility (Foundation Press, New York, N.Y. 2002) (with Thomas D. Morgan).
- 2003 Selected Standards on Professional Responsibility (Foundation Press, New York, N.Y. 2003) (with Thomas D. Morgan).
- Legal Ethics: The Lawyer's Deskbook on Professional Responsibility (ABA-West Group, St. Paul, Minn. 2000) (a Treatise on legal ethics, jointly published by the ABA and West Group, a division of Thomson Publishing).
- Modern Constitutional Law: Cases and Notes (West Group, St. Paul, Minnesota, 6th ed. 2000).
- 2000 Supplement to Modern Constitutional Law (West Group, St. Paul, Minnesota, 6th ed. 2000).
- 2001 Supplement to Modern Constitutional Law (West Group, St. Paul, Minnesota, 6th ed. 2001).
- 2002 Supplement to Modern Constitutional Law (West Group, St. Paul, Minnesota, 6th ed. 2002).
- Constitutional Law (West Group, St. Paul, Minnesota, 6th ed. 2000) (a one-volume treatise on Constitutional Law) (with John E. Nowak).
- Professional Responsibility (West Group, St. Paul, Minnesota, 5th ed. 2001, Black Letter Series).
- Professional Responsibility: A Student's Guide (ABA-West Group, St. Paul, Minnesota, 2001).
- Legal Ethics: The Lawyer's Deskbook on Professional Responsibility (ABA-West Group, St. Paul, Minn., 2nd ed. 2002) (a Treatise on legal ethics, jointly published by the ABA and West Group, a division of Thomson Publishing).
- Professional Responsibility: A Student's Guide (ABA-West Group, St. Paul, Minnesota, 2nd ed. 2002).
- Professional Responsibility (West Group, St. Paul, Minnesota, 6th ed. 2002, Black Letter Series).
- Legal Ethics in a Nutshell (West Group, St. Paul, Minnesota, 1st ed. 2003, Nutshell Series) (with Michael I. Krauss).
- Modern Constitutional Law: Cases and Notes (Thomson/West, St. Paul, Minnesota, 7th ed. 2003).
- 2003 Supplement to Modern Constitutional Law (Thomson/West, St. Paul, Minnesota, 2003).
- 2004 Supplement to Modern Constitutional Law (Thomson/West, St. Paul, Minnesota, 2004).
- 2005 Supplement to Modern Constitutional Law (Thomson/West, St. Paul, Minnesota, 2005).
- 2006 Supplement to Modern Constitutional Law (Thomson/West, St. Paul, Minnesota, 2006).
- Problems and Materials on Professional Responsibility (Foundation Press, New York, N.Y., 8th ed. 2003) (with Thomas D. Morgan).
- 2004 Selected Standards on Professional Responsibility (Foundation Press, New York, N.Y. 2004) (with Thomas D. Morgan).
- 2005 Selected Standards on Professional Responsibility (Foundation Press, New York, N.Y. 2005) (with Thomas D. Morgan).
- Constitutional Law (Thomson/West, St. Paul, Minnesota, 7th ed. 2004) (a one-volume treatise on Constitutional Law) (with John E. Nowak).
- Professional Responsibility (Thomson/West, St. Paul, Minnesota, 7th ed. 2004, Black Letter Series).
- Principles of Constitutional Law (Thomson/West, St. Paul, Minnesota, 1st ed. 2004) (with John E. Nowak).
- Legal Ethics: The Lawyer's Deskbook on Professional Responsibility (ABA- Thomson/West, St. Paul, Minn., 3rd ed. 2005) (a Treatise on legal ethics, jointly published by the ABA and Thomson/West) (with John S. Dzienkowski).
- Professional Responsibility: A Student's Guide (ABA-Thomson/West, St. Paul, Minn., 3rd ed. 2005) (a Treatise on legal ethics, jointly published by the ABA and Thomson/West) (with John S. Dzienkowski).
- Principles of Constitutional Law (Thomson/West, St. Paul, Minnesota, 2nd ed. 2005) (with John E. Nowak).
- Legal Ethics in a Nutshell (Thomson/West, St. Paul, Minnesota, 2nd ed. 2006, Nutshell Series) (with Michael I. Krauss).
- Problems and Materials on Professional Responsibility (Foundation Press, New York, N.Y., 9th ed. 2006) (with Thomas D. Morgan).
- 2006 Selected Standards on Professional Responsibility (Foundation Press, New York, N.Y. 2006) (with Thomas D. Morgan).
- 2007 Selected Standards on Professional Responsibility (Foundation Press, New York, N.Y. 2007) (with Thomas D. Morgan).
- 2008 Selected Standards on Professional Responsibility (Foundation Press, New York, N.Y. 2008) (with Thomas D. Morgan).
- Legal Ethics: The Lawyer's Deskbook on Professional Responsibility (ABA-Thomson/West, St. Paul, Minn., 4th ed. 2006) (a Treatise on legal ethics, jointly published by the ABA and Thomson/West) (with John S. Dzienkowski).
- Professional Responsibility: A Student's Guide (ABA-Thomson/West, St. Paul, Minn., 4th ed. 2006) (a Treatise on legal ethics, jointly published by the ABA and Thomson/West) (with John S. Dzienkowski).
- Modern Constitutional Law: Cases and Notes (Thomson/West, St. Paul, Minnesota, 8th ed. 2007).
- 2007 Supplement to Modern Constitutional Law (Thomson/West, St. Paul, Minnesota, 2007).
- 2008 Supplement to Modern Constitutional Law (Thomson/West, St. Paul, Minnesota, 2008).
- Legal Ethics in a Nutshell (Thomson/West, St. Paul, Minnesota, 3rd ed. 2007, Nutshell Series).
- Legal Ethics: The Lawyer's Deskbook on Professional Responsibility (ABA-Thomson/West, St. Paul, Minn., 5th ed. 2007) (a Treatise on legal ethics, jointly published by the ABA and Thomson/West) (with John S. Dzienkowski).
- Professional Responsibility: A Student's Guide (ABA-Thomson/West, St. Paul, Minn., 5th ed. 2007) (a Treatise on legal ethics, jointly published by the ABA and Thomson/West) (with John S. Dzienkowski).
- 언론의 자유와 미국 헌법, Freedom of Speech and the American Constitution (Korean Studies Information Co. Ltd. Publishers, Korea, 2007) (translated into Korean by Professor Lee Boo-Ha, Yeungnam University College of Law and Political Science), coauthored with Professor John E. Nowak.
- Principles of Constitutional Law (Thomson/West, St. Paul, Minnesota, 3rd ed. 2007) (with John E. Nowak).
- Treatise on Constitutional Law: Substance and Procedure (Thomson/West, St. Paul, Minnesota, 4th ed. 2007) (first two volumes of six-volume treatise) (with John E. Nowak).
- 2007 Pocket Part to Treatise on Constitutional Law: Substance and Procedure (Thomson/West, St. Paul, Minnesota, 2007) (with John E. Nowak).
- Treatise on Constitutional Law: Substance and Procedure (Thomson/West, St. Paul, Minnesota, 4th ed. 2008) (last four volumes of six volume treatise) (with John E. Nowak).
- 2008 Pocket Part to Treatise on Constitutional Law: Substance and Procedure (Thomson/West, St. Paul, Minnesota, 2008) (with John E. Nowak).
- 2009 Pocket Part to Treatise on Constitutional Law: Substance and Procedure (Thomson/West, St. Paul, Minnesota, 2009) (with John E. Nowak).
- 2010 Pocket Part to Treatise on Constitutional Law: Substance and Procedure (Thomson/West, St. Paul, Minnesota, 2010) (with John E. Nowak).
- 2011 Pocket Part to Treatise on Constitutional Law: Substance and Procedure (Thomson/West, St. Paul, Minnesota, 2011) (with John E. Nowak).
- 2012 Pocket Part to Treatise on Constitutional Law: Substance and Procedure (Thomson/West, St. Paul, Minnesota, 2012) (with John E. Nowak).
- Problems and Materials on Professional Responsibility (Foundation Press, New York, N.Y., 10th ed. 2008) (with Thomas D. Morgan).
- 2009 Selected Standards on Professional Responsibility (Foundation Press, New York, N.Y. 2009) (with Thomas D. Morgan).
- 2010 Selected Standards on Professional Responsibility (Foundation Press, New York, N.Y. 2010) (with Thomas D. Morgan).
- 2011 Selected Standards on Professional Responsibility (Foundation Press, New York, N.Y. 2011) (with Thomas D. Morgan).
- Professional Responsibility (Thomson/West, St. Paul, Minnesota, 8th ed. 2008, Black Letter Series).
- Legal Ethics: The Lawyer's Deskbook on Professional Responsibility (ABA-Thomson/West, St. Paul, Minn., 6th ed. 2008) (a Treatise on legal ethics, jointly published by the ABA and Thomson/West) (with John S. Dzienkowski).
- Professional Responsibility: A Student's Guide (ABA-Thomson/West, St. Paul, Minn., 6th ed. 2008) (a Treatise on legal ethics, jointly published by the ABA and Thomson/West) (with John S. Dzienkowski).
- Modern Constitutional Law: Cases and Notes (West Thomson Reuters, St. Paul, Minnesota, 9th ed. 2009).
- 2009 Supplement to Modern Constitutional Law (Thomson/West, St. Paul, Minnesota, 2009).
- 2010 Supplement to Modern Constitutional Law (Thomson/West, St. Paul, Minnesota, 2010).
- 2011 Supplement to Modern Constitutional Law (Thomson/West, St. Paul, Minnesota, 2011).
- Legal Ethics: The Lawyer's Deskbook on Professional Responsibility (ABA-Thomson/West, St. Paul, Minn., 7th ed. 2009) (a Treatise on legal ethics, jointly published by the ABA and Thomson/West) (with John S. Dzienkowski).
- Professional Responsibility: A Student's Guide (ABA-Thomson/West, St. Paul, Minn., 7th ed. 2009) (a Treatise on legal ethics, jointly published by the ABA and Thomson/West) (with John S. Dzienkowski).
- Constitutional Law (Thomson/West, St. Paul, Minnesota, 7th ed. 2010) (a one-volume treatise on Constitutional Law) (with John E. Nowak).
- Legal Ethics: The Lawyer's Deskbook on Professional Responsibility (ABA-Thomson/West, St. Paul, Minn., 8th ed. 2010) (a Treatise on legal ethics, jointly published by the ABA and Thomson/West) (with John S. Dzienkowski).
- Professional Responsibility: A Student's Guide (ABA-Thomson/West, St. Paul, Minn., 8th ed. 2010) (a Treatise on legal ethics, jointly published by the ABA and Thomson/West) (with John S. Dzienkowski).
- Principles of Constitutional Law (West-Thomson/Reuters, St. Paul, Minnesota, 4th ed. 2010) (with John E. Nowak).
- Problems and Materials on Professional Responsibility (Foundation Press, New York, N.Y., 11th ed. 2011) (with Thomas D. Morgan & John S. Dzienkowski).
- 2012 Selected Standards on Professional Responsibility (Foundation Press, New York, N.Y. 2012) (with Thomas D. Morgan).
- 2013 Selected Standards on Professional Responsibility (Foundation Press, New York, N.Y. 2013) (with Thomas D. Morgan).
- 2014 Selected Standards on Professional Responsibility (Foundation Press, West Academic, St. Paul, MN 2014) (with Thomas D. Morgan).
- Legal Ethics: The Lawyer's Deskbook on Professional Responsibility (ABA-Thomson/West, St. Paul, Minn., 9th ed. 2011) (a Treatise on legal ethics, jointly published by the ABA and Thomson/West) (with John S. Dzienkowski).
- Professional Responsibility: A Student's Guide (ABA-Thomson/West, St. Paul, Minn., 9th ed. 2011) (a Treatise on legal ethics, jointly published by the ABA and Thomson/West) (with John S. Dzienkowski).
- Professional Responsibility (West: A Thomson-Reuters Co., St. Paul, Minnesota, 9th ed. 2011, Black Letter Series).
- Problems and Materials on Professional Responsibility: Concise Edition (Foundation Press, New York, N.Y., 11th ed. 2012) (with Thomas D. Morgan & John S. Dzienkowski).
- Modern Constitutional Law: Cases and Notes (West Thomson Reuters, St. Paul, Minnesota, 10th ed. 2012).
- 2012 Supplement to Modern Constitutional Law (Thomson/West, St. Paul, Minnesota, 2012).
- 2013 Supplement to Modern Constitutional Law (Thomson/West, St. Paul, Minnesota, 2013).
- 2014 Supplement to Modern Constitutional Law (West Academic Publishing, St. Paul, Minnesota, 2014).
- 概論 アメリカの法曹倫理 第3版――事例解説 [Introduction to American Legal Ethics] (translated by Naoyuki Toyama) (Thomson Reuters, Japan UNI Agency, Inc. Tokyo, 2012).
- Legal Ethics: The Lawyer's Deskbook on Professional Responsibility (ABA-Thomson/West, St. Paul, Minn., 10th ed. 2012) (a Treatise on legal ethics, jointly published by the ABA and Thomson/West) (with John S. Dzienkowski).
- Professional Responsibility: A Student's Guide (ABA-Thomson/West, St. Paul, Minn., 10th ed. 2012) (a Treatise on legal ethics, jointly published by the ABA and Thomson/West) (with John S. Dzienkowski).
- Legal Ethics in a Nutshell (Thomson/West, St. Paul, Minnesota, 4th ed. 2013, Nutshell Series).
- Treatise on Constitutional Law: Substance and Procedure (Thomson/West, St. Paul, Minnesota, 5th ed. 2012) (first three volumes of six-volume treatise) (with John E. Nowak).
- Treatise on Constitutional Law: Substance and Procedure (Thomson/West, St. Paul, Minnesota, 5th ed. 2013) (last three volumes of six-volume treatise) (with John E. Nowak).
- 2013 Pocket Part to Treatise on Constitutional Law: Substance and Procedure (Thomson/West, St. Paul, Minnesota, 2013) (with John E. Nowak).
- 2014 Pocket Part to Treatise on Constitutional Law: Substance and Procedure (Thomson Reuters, Eagan, Minnesota, 2014) (with John E. Nowak).
- 2015 Pocket Part to Treatise on Constitutional Law: Substance and Procedure (Thomson Reuters, Eagan, Minnesota, 2015) (with John E. Nowak).
- 2016 Pocket Part to Treatise on Constitutional Law: Substance and Procedure (Thomson Reuters, Eagan, Minnesota, 2016) (with John E. Nowak).
- 2017 Pocket Part to Treatise on Constitutional Law: Substance and Procedure (Thomson Reuters, Eagan, Minnesota, 2016) (with John E. Nowak).
- Legal Ethics: The Lawyer's Deskbook on Professional Responsibility (ABA-Thomson Reuters, St. Paul, Minn., 11th ed. 2013) (a Treatise on legal ethics, jointly published by the ABA and Thomson/West) (with John S. Dzienkowski).
- Professional Responsibility: A Student's Guide (ABA- Thomson Reuters, St. Paul, Minn., 11th ed. 2013) (a Treatise on legal ethics, jointly published by the ABA and Thomson/West) (with John S. Dzienkowski).
- Problems and Materials on Professional Responsibility (Foundation Press, St. Paul, MN. 12th ed. 2014) (with Thomas D. Morgan & John S. Dzienkowski).
- 2015 Selected Standards on Professional Responsibility (Foundation Press, West Academic, St. Paul, MN 2015) (with Thomas D. Morgan).
- 2016 Selected Standards on Professional Responsibility (Foundation Press, West Academic, St. Paul, MN 2016) (with Thomas D. Morgan).
- 2017 Selected Standards on Professional Responsibility (Foundation Press, West Academic, St. Paul, MN 2017) (with Thomas D. Morgan).
- Problems and Materials on Professional Responsibility: Concise Edition (Foundation Press, St. Paul, MN. 12th ed. 2014) (with Thomas D. Morgan & John S. Dzienkowski).
- Legal Ethics: The Lawyer's Deskbook on Professional Responsibility (ABA-Thomson Reuters, Eagan, Minn., 12th ed. 2014) (a Treatise on legal ethics, jointly published by the ABA and Thomson Reuters) (with John S. Dzienkowski).
- Modern Constitutional Law: Cases and Notes (West Thomson Reuters, St. Paul, Minnesota, 11th ed. 2015)(unabridged edition).
- Modern Constitutional Law: Cases and Notes (West Thomson Reuters, St. Paul, Minnesota, 11th ed. 2015)(abridged edition).
- Legal Ethics: The Lawyer's Deskbook on Professional Responsibility (ABA-Thomson Reuters, Eagan, Minn., 13th ed. 2015) (a Treatise on legal ethics, jointly published by the ABA and Thomson Reuters) (with John S. Dzienkowski).
- 第4版 アメリカの法曹倫理: 事例解説 単行本[Introduction to American Legal Ethics] (translated, ロナルド・D. ロタンダ (著), (原著), 当山 尚幸 (翻訳), 武田 昌則 (翻訳), 石田 京子 (翻訳)) (West Academic Publishing, through Japan UNI Agency, Inc. Tokyo, 4th ed. 2015).
- Principles of Constitutional Law (Thomson/West, St. Paul, Minnesota, 5th ed. 2016) (with John E. Nowak).
- Legal Ethics: The Lawyer's Deskbook on Professional Responsibility (ABA-Thomson Reuters, Eagan, Minn., 14th ed. 2016) (a Treatise on legal ethics, jointly published by the ABA and Thomson Reuters) (with John S. Dzienkowski).
- American Constitutional Law: The Supreme Court in American History Volume 1 – Institutional Powers (West Academic Publishing 2016)
- American Constitutional Law: The Supreme Court in American History Volume 2 – Liberties (West Academic Publishing 2016).
- Рональд Д. Ротунда, Либерализм как слово и символ : борьба за либеральный бренд в США (Социум, Москва, 2016).
- Legal Ethics: The Lawyer's Deskbook on Professional Responsibility (ABA-Thomson Reuters, Eagan, Minn., 15th ed. 2017) (a Treatise on legal ethics, jointly published by the ABA and Thomson Reuters) (with John S. Dzienkowski).
