= Karl Scholz =

American academic

19th President of the University of Oregon
- Incumbent
- Assumed office July 1, 2023
- Preceded by: Michael Schill

Chancellor of the University of Wisconsin–Madison
- Acting; June 1, 2022 – August 4, 2022
- Preceded by: Rebecca Blank
- Succeeded by: Jennifer Mnookin

Provost of the University of Wisconsin–Madison
- In office 2019–2023
- Chancellor: Rebecca Blank; Himself (acting); Jennifer Mnookin
- Preceded by: Sarah C. Mangelsdorf
- Succeeded by: Charles Lee Isbell Jr.

Personal details
- Born: John Karl Scholz Lincoln, Nebraska, U.S.
- Education: Carleton College (BA); Stanford University (MA, PhD)

John Karl Scholz is an American economist who has been the 19th president of the University of Oregon since 2023.

== Early life and education ==
Scholz grew up in Lincoln, Nebraska. His father was a chemistry professor at the University of Nebraska–Lincoln and his mother had a graduate degree in microbiology. He earned an undergraduate degree in economics from Carleton College in Northfield, Minnesota in 1981, and went on to earn a Ph.D. in economics from Stanford University in 1988.

== Career ==
He joined the economics faculty of the University of Wisconsin–Madison in 1988 and was later named the Nellie June Gray Professor of Economic Policy. From 2000 to 2004, he directed the Institute for Research on Poverty at the university. He was named dean of the University of Wisconsin–Madison College of Letters and Science in 2013, and served in that role until 2019, when he was named university provost. In 2022, Scholz was a finalist for university chancellor, but was not selected. He served as interim chancellor from June to August 2022.

In 2023, he was unanimously selected as president of the University of Oregon by the university's board of trustees.

In addition to his academic career, Scholz served in two Presidential administrations: he was a senior staff economist at the Council of Economic Advisers during the George H. W. Bush Administration from 1990 to 1992 and was a deputy assistant secretary for tax analysis at the U.S. Department of the Treasury under President Bill Clinton from 1997 to 1998.

Scholz's economics research has included topics such as household saving, the earned income tax credit, low-wage labor markets, financial barriers to higher education, and bankruptcy laws.

== Personal ==
Scholz played basketball in high school and college. He met his future wife, Melissa Auchard Scholz, an attorney, while both were studying at Stanford. They have three daughters.
