= Shih-Chun Wang =

Chinese-American medical doctor and scientist (1910–1993)

- Born: January 25, 1910; Tianjin, China
- Died: June 6, 1993 (aged 83); Englewood, New Jersey, US
- Education: Yenching University (BS); Peking Union Medical College (MD); Northwestern University (PhD)
- Known for: Development of anti-vomiting drugs
- Spouse: Mamie Wang
- Children: Phyllis Wise
- Scientific career
- Fields: Neuroscience, Neuropharmacology
- Workplaces: Columbia University
- Thesis: The autonomic centers and descending pathways in the brain stem and spinal cord (1940)
- Doctoral advisor: S.W. Ransom

Shih-Chun Wang (January 25, 1910 – June 6, 1993) was a Chinese-American medical doctor, neuroscientist, and pharmacology professor.

== Early life and education ==
Wang was born on January 25, 1910, in Tianjin, China. He attended Yenching University in Beijing where he received a bachelor of science in 1931 before going to Peking Union Medical College to earn his medical degree in 1935. In 1937, Wang received a Rockefeller Foundation fellowship to travel to the United States to study neurology at Northwestern University in Evanston, Illinois. He worked under the direction of S.W. Ransom at the Institute of Neurology in the Northwestern University Medical School where he received his Ph.D. in 1940. While still a student at Northwestern, Wang married the former Mamie Kwoh, a registered nurse from China.

== Career ==
From 1941 until 1956 he was a member of Columbia University's Department of Physiology, and after that he joined its Department of Pharmacology. He was the first person to be its Gustavus A. Pfeiffer Professor of Pharmacology, and he retired in 1978. Wang was elected a member of Academia Sinica in 1958.

His research into motion sickness led to the creation of drugs to prevent problems such as vomiting. He studied nausea in astronauts for NASA, which helped lead to the creation of the vomit comet.

Surgeon Commander Christopher J. Davis OBE of the Royal Navy wrote in 1995, "Shih-Chun Wang who, in conjunction with Herbert Borison in 1950, had published the last major development in ideas concerning the mechanism of vomiting control."

=== Later life ===
After moving to New York City, Wang's wife Mamie taught nursing courses at the Cornell School of Nursing and helped develop the training program for nurse practitioners. Shih-Chun and Mamie had two daughters. One daughter, Phyllis Wise, followed in her parents' footsteps and went on to become a medical research scientist, and later became a university administrator who led several large universities. Wang died on June 6, 1993, in a hospital in Englewood, New Jersey.

== Awards and honors ==
In 1951 he received a Guggenheim Fellowship.

Wang also received the Sigma Xi Award at Northwestern University, a Commonwealth Foundation Fellowship, and an American Chinese Medical Society Scientific Achievement Award. He was elected a member of Academic Sinica and was an honorary member of the Chinese Pharmacological Society.

== Selected publications ==
- Wang, Shih-Chun (1980). Physiology and pharmacology of the brain stem. Futura. ISBN 978-0879931278.
- Borison, Herbert L.; Wang, Shih-Chun (1953). "Physiology and pharmacology of vomiting". Pharmacological Reviews. 5 (2): 193–230. PMID 13064033.
- Wang, Shih-Chun; Borison, Herbert L. (1950). "The vomiting center: A critical experimental analysis". Archives of Neurology & Psychiatry. 63 (6): 928–941. doi:10.1001/archneurpsyc.1950.02310240087005. PMID 15426437.
- Wang, Shih-Chun; Harrison, Frank (1939). "The nature of bladder responses following stimulation of the anterior hypothalamus". American Journal of Physiology. 125 (2): 301–309. doi:10.1152/ajplegacy.1939.125.2.301.
- Wang, S.C.; Ranson, S.W. (1939). "Autonomic responses to electrical stimulation of the lower brain stem". Journal of Comparative Neurology. 71 (3): 437–455. doi:10.1002/cne.900710304. S2CID 85220550.
- Wang, Shih-Chun (1938). "Vasomotor Responses from Application of Drugs to the Medullary Region". Proceedings of the Society for Experimental Biology and Medicine. 39 (3): 456–458. doi:10.3181/00379727-39-10238. S2CID 72681093.
