= Richard Herman =

American academic administrator

Richard H. Herman

8th Chancellor of the University of Illinois at Urbana-Champaign
- In office 2004–2009
- Preceded by: Nancy Cantor
- Succeeded by: Phyllis Wise

Personal details
- Education: Stevens Institute of Technology; University of Maryland, College Park
- Scientific career
- Fields: Mathematics
- Workplaces: University of California, Los Angeles; Pennsylvania State University; University of Maryland, College Park
- Thesis: On strictly singular operators and related concepts (1967)

Richard H. Herman is a mathematician, currently Professor Emeritus of Mathematics, who had served as the Chancellor of the University of Illinois at Urbana-Champaign from 2005–2009.

President Bush appointed Herman to his Council of Advisors on Science and Technology, serving on subcommittees which advised the President on nanotechnology, networking and information technology and university-private sector partnerships. He co-chaired the High Performance Computing Initiative for the Council on Competitiveness as well as serving on the steering committee for its Energy, Security, Innovation and Sustainability Initiative and the Council's Executive Committee.

Herman served as chair of the Council of Presidents for the University Research Association in 2007. He also served on, and was chair of, the National Science Foundation's Advisory Committee. Herman's research specializes on mathematical physics and operator algebras.

== Early life ==
Herman was raised in his grandfather's house in Brooklyn. He attended Stevens Institute of Technology, where he received a B.S. in mathematics in 1963. He later received his Ph.D. in mathematics from University of Maryland, College Park, in 1967.

After graduating from Maryland, Herman taught mathematics at the University of California, Los Angeles from 1968 to 1972. He moved to Pennsylvania State University in 1972 and later served as chairman of the Mathematics Department from 1986 to 1990. In 1990, he returned to University of Maryland in College Park to serve as dean until 1998.

== University of Illinois ==
He previously served there as Provost and Vice Chancellor of Academic Affairs since 1998. As provost he garnered support for, and administered, a "faculty excellence" program designed to bring established faculty to the institution. Throughout his administrative tenure, sponsored research at the university increased by more than 50%.

Herman promoted private sector partnerships by supporting the creation of a Research Park and, in particular, by helping to secure a $500 million grant from BP (British Petroleum), in partnership with Berkeley. Commitments to the creation of the Carl R. Woese Institute for Genomic Biology and the garnering of the Petascale Award with IBM from the National Science Foundation ensured continued scientific and technological leadership for the university

Herman helped to secure several gifts including $100 million from alumnus Thomas Siebel for support of research in science and technology, $14 million for a Center for Brazilian Studies from the Lemann Family and an anonymous gift of $40 million for undergraduate student support.

== Admissions controversy ==
The Chicago Tribune reported on Friday, May 29, 2009 that several students had been admitted to the University based upon connections or recommendations by Board of Trustees, Chicago politicians, and members of the Rod Blagojevich administration. The improprieties occurred, according to the Tribune, on the Urbana-Champaign campus headed by Herman. The Tribune obtained through a FOIA request several emails between Herman, then law dean Heidi Hurd and others spanning a number of years and establishing without any doubt that preferential treatment had been given to well-connected students. The Tribune also reported on one case in which the University's president, B. Joseph White, had received a recommendation for a relative of the (subsequently convicted) fundraiser Tony Rezko to be admitted. The Tribune posted emails of Herman to admissions staff pushing for less qualified students to be accepted, citing particularly an exchange between Herman, admissions officers, and the then-dean of the college of law Heidi Hurd. The controversy has sparked condemnation from student trustee Paul Schmitt and state lawmakers. It is quite unusual for deans, let alone provosts, to interfere with admissions staff in deciding whether or not to admit individual applicants. Their usual role is to provide guidance and direction as to admissions policies.

As a result of the "clout controversy", several state lawmakers including Representatives, Naomi Jakobsson, Chapin Rose, and Bill Black have called for legislative investigations. Chairman of the Illinois House of Higher Education Committee, Representative Mike Boland, has called for Herman's and White's removal, as well as several administrators including and members of the Board of Trustees, saying "They were trusted to protect our university. In my eyes, they failed in that regard and they should resign."

In September 2009, Urbana alumni in the Chicago area wrote to the governor and board of trustees praising Herman for his many accomplishments during his term as Chancellor. These included highlighting his fundraising leadership and efforts to raise the campus' share of the Brilliant Futures $2.25 billion campaign, his efforts to increase Urbana's research presence including leading in creating the Energy Biosciences Institute, a $500 million research program to study converting plant biomass to fuel, helping to create an outreach effort with Chicago Public Schools to increase recruitment of students and increasing diversity on campus, among other accomplishments.

After months of calls for his resignation, on 20 October 2009 Herman announced he would resign as Chancellor for his role in the controversy. He was replaced in August 2011 by Phyllis Wise, the former Interim President and current Provost of the University of Washington.

== Honors ==
Herman is an Eagle Scout and a recipient of the Distinguished Eagle Scout Award.

In 2008 Herman was elected a Fellow of the American Academy of Arts and Sciences.

The Rainbow Push Program named Herman as Educator of the Year in 2009.

Herman received the Malone Award from APLU in 2009.

Academic offices
Preceded by Nancy Cantor	Chancellor of the University of Illinois at Urbana-Champaign; 2004–2009	Succeeded by Robert A. Easter; Acting
