= William P. Gerberding =

American educator (1929–2014)

William Passavant Gerberding
- Portrait of William Passavant Gerberding by Margaret Holland Sargent

27th President of the University of Washington
- In office 1979–1995

2nd Chancellor of the University of Illinois at Urbana-Champaign
- In office 1978–1979
- Preceded by: Morton W. Weir (acting)
- Succeeded by: John E. Cribbet

Personal details
- Born: September 9, 1929 Fargo, North Dakota, U.S.
- Died: December 27, 2014 (aged 85) Seattle, Washington, U.S.
- Education: Macalester College; University of Chicago
- Profession: University administrator, professor

William Passavant Gerberding (September 9, 1929 – December 27, 2014) was an American educator. He served as the 2nd chancellor of the University of Illinois at Urbana-Champaign from 1978 to 1979 and as the 27th president of the University of Washington from 1979 to 1995.

== Biography ==
Gerberding was born in Fargo, North Dakota. He was the youngest of four children born to Lutheran minister William Gerberding and his wife Esther Habighorst. He received his BA from Macalester College in 1951, and went on to earn an MA in 1956 and a Ph.D. in 1959 from the University of Chicago.

Gerberding was a professor at Colgate University, and at UCLA, where he was chairman of the political science department. He served as vice president of academic affairs at Occidental College in Los Angeles, California, in 1972. In 1975, he was the executive vice-chancellor at UCLA. In 1978, he was the chancellor of the University of Illinois at Urbana-Champaign.

Gerberding served as the 27th president of the University of Washington in Seattle from 1979 to 1995. His 16 years of service is the longest term of any president in the history of the university. He died at the age of 85 on December 27, 2014.

== Memorials ==
In 1995, the 1949-built Administration Building at the University of Washington was renamed Gerberding Hall in his honor.

Academic offices
Preceded by Morton W. Weir; Acting	Chancellor of the University of Illinois at Urbana-Champaign; 1978–1979	Succeeded by John E. Cribbet
Preceded by John R. Hogness	President of the University of Washington; 1979–1995	Succeeded by Richard L. McCormick
