= Nancy Cantor =

Academic and University Administrator

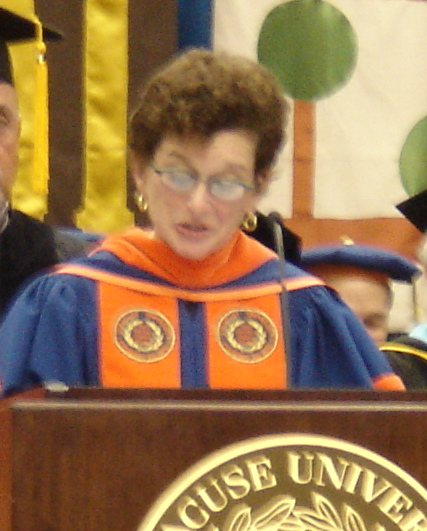
- Nancy Cantor in 2006

14th President of Hunter College
- Incumbent
- Assumed office August 12, 2024
- Preceded by: Ann Kirschner

2nd Chancellor of Rutgers University–Newark
- In office 2014–2024
- Preceded by: Steven Diner

11th Chancellor and President of Syracuse University
- In office August 1, 2004 – December 31, 2013
- Preceded by: Kenneth Shaw
- Succeeded by: Kent Syverud

7th Chancellor of the University of Illinois Urbana-Champaign
- In office 2001–2004
- Preceded by: Michael Aiken
- Succeeded by: Richard Herman

Personal details
- Born: February 4, 1952 (age 74)
- Education: Sarah Lawrence College (BA); Stanford University (PhD)
- Website: www.newark.rutgers.edu/nancy-cantor
- Scientific career
- Fields: Psychology
- Institutions: Princeton University; University of Michigan; University of Illinois at Urbana-Champaign; Syracuse University; Rutgers University–Newark
- Thesis: Prototypicality and personality judgments (1978)
- Doctoral advisor: Walter Mischel

Nancy Ellen Cantor (born February 4, 1952) is an American academic administrator who has been serving as the 14th president of Hunter College in New York City since August 2024.

She previously served as the 2nd chancellor of Rutgers University–Newark from 2014 to 2024, as the 11th chancellor at Syracuse University from 2003 to 2014, and as the 11th chancellor of the University of Illinois at Urbana-Champaign from 2001 to 2004.

== Early life and education ==
Cantor was born in New York City. She received a Bachelor of Arts in 1974 from Sarah Lawrence College and a Doctor of Philosophy in psychology in 1978 from Stanford University. At Stanford, Cantor initiated a program of research on person prototypes with Walter Mischel inspired by the categorization research of Eleanor Rosch and Carolyn Mervis.

== Career ==
Early in her career, Cantor held teaching positions at the University of Michigan and Princeton University. As an academic administrator, she served as provost and executive vice president for academic affairs at the University of Michigan from 1997 to 2001 and then chancellor of the University of Illinois at Urbana-Champaign from 2001 until 2004.

=== Syracuse University ===
In 2004, Cantor was selected chancellor of Syracuse University. The university's board of trustees judged her initial five years to be very successful, pointing to her work with students, faculty and staff that leveraged the university's historic strengths, fostered innovation and creativity, and connected the institution in ways with the community, all of which has increased the university's quality and national visibility. Cantor received criticism for an overall deterioration in the university's academic standing as a research center resulting in a decline in admissions standards, with its acceptance rate climbing from mid-50 to more than 60 percent. Certain faculty members took issue with what was seen as "authoritarian rule". Syracuse history professor David H. Bennett commented, “My fear is that the university is moving away from selective to inclusive."

Cantor headed a major fundraising campaign at Syracuse and was responsible for the development of the university’s Scholarship in Action initiative, which emphasized the role of the university as a public good. It was noted that Scholarship in Action was both popular and divisive at the same time. The Connective Corridor was the physical part of Scholarship in Action that aimed to bridge gaps between a wealthy university and a surrounding struggling city.

In 2006, following segments of racially discriminatory content that aired at the student-run TV station HillTV, Cantor halted production so that a university panel could review the content in keeping with the university's conduct code. “With free expression comes responsibilities for being a part of a campus community,” Cantor said in an interview. "We have codes of conduct. I don’t think it is beyond question to ask people who are in a diverse campus community to abide by those codes." Certain university faculty expressed concern that a divide had been created between free speech advocates and the chancellor supporters. ”There’s a tension,” said journalism professor Charlotte Grimes. ”I think people are increasingly cautious about what they say publicly, particularly if they don’t have tenure. There is a sense that if you speak out you might very well get a phone call from the powers that be.” Over 60 professors and staff signed an open letter protesting the move and Cantor's decision. Ultimately, a university panel allowed the station to re-open.

The University received criticism for withdrawing from the Association of American Universities membership in 2011 for "not meeting AAU criteria for producing research".

Upon her departure from Syracuse, Board of Trustees Chairman Richard L. Thompson said of Cantor, "The Rutgers-Newark campus and community are gaining one of the nation’s outstanding academic leaders and the Rutgers board is gaining a deeply thoughtful, energetic and committed partner. Nancy has been a superlative leader, seeing our University to wonderful success and helping us to build on our distinctive greatness and achieve new heights." Cantor's premature resignation 2 years prior to the ending of her contract raised questions from those at the university as to whether or not she was "pressured" to leave.

=== Rutgers University ===
In 2014, Cantor left Syracuse and took a position as chancellor of Rutgers University–Newark.

On March 4, 2019, Cantor was recorded confronting campus police during a minor traffic accident investigation involving her driver's car and a Rutgers University campus police car. Excerpts of Cantor shouting "I’m the chancellor!" went viral online. Cantor issued an apology for her behavior, after an open records request brought the video to light three months later.

=== Hunter College ===
On February 13, 2024, Cantor was appointed as the 14th President of Hunter College, and began her term on August 12, 2024.

== Awards ==
Cantor is a Fellow of the American Academy of Arts and Sciences and a member of the Institute of Medicine of the National Academy of Sciences. She was the 1985 recipient of the American Psychological Association Award for Distinguished Scientific Early Career Contributions in the area of personality psychology. Her award citation emphasized her contributions to the study of social categorization, specifically, how concepts are structured in terms of probabilities as fuzzy sets. Other awards include the Woman of Achievement Award from the Anti-Defamation League, the Making a Difference for Women Award from the National Council for Research on Women, the Reginald Wilson Diversity Leadership Award from the American Council on Education, and the Frank W. Hale, Jr. Diversity Leadership Award from the National Association of Diversity Officers in Higher Education. Cantor was granted the 2008 Carnegie Corporation Academic Leadership Award.

== Personal life ==
Cantor is married to sociology professor Steven R. Brechin, who teaches at Rutgers University-New Brunswick.

Academic offices
| Preceded by Michael Aiken | Chancellor of the University of Illinois at Urbana-Champaign; 2001–2004 | Succeeded by Richard Herman |
| Preceded by Kenneth Shaw | Chancellor of Syracuse University; 2004–2013 | Succeeded by Kent Syverud |
| Preceded by Todd Clear; Interim | Chancellor of Rutgers University–Newark; 2014–2024 | Succeeded by Jeffrey Robinson; Interim |
