= Mamie Wang =

American nursing professor

Mamie Kwoh Wang (died March 12, 2002) was a director and vice-president of the American Bureau for Medical Advancement in China Inc (ABMAC). She was also a professor at the Cornell School of Nursing and helped develop the training program for nurse practitioners.

She was predeceased by her husband Shih-Chun Wang, who was a physiologist and pharmacologist on the faculty of the Columbia University College of Physicians and Surgeons. Her daughter, Phyllis Wise, was the 9th Chancellor of the University of Illinois at Urbana-Champaign and interim president of the University of Washington.

Wang had a diploma in Nursing from Peiping Medical College School of Nursing (Peiping China 1938), B.S. Yenching University (1938) and an M.A. from Columbia University (1943).
