= John E. Cribbet =

American educator (1918–2009)

John Edward Cribbet

3rd Chancellor of the University of Illinois at Urbana-Champaign
- In office 1979–1984
- Preceded by: William P. Gerberding
- Succeeded by: Thomas Eugene Everhart

(acting, 1979)

Personal details
- Born: February 21, 1918 Findlay, Illinois, U.S.
- Died: May 23, 2009 (aged 91)
- Education: Illinois Wesleyan University (BA); University of Illinois at Urbana-Champaign (JD)
- Profession: University administrator, professor

John Edward Cribbet (February 21, 1918 – May 23, 2009) was a well-known legal scholar, dean of the University of Illinois College of Law, and chancellor of the University of Illinois.

== Biography ==
Cribbet was born in Findlay, Illinois, just outside Decatur. His mother raised him after his father died from the Spanish flu. Cribbet received his undergraduate degree from Illinois Wesleyan University. There, he met his wife Betty Smith. After graduation, Cribbet joined the Army for World War II. He served as an aide-de-camp for Lt. Gen. Troy H. Middleton on the European front. His service produced a number of medals and stories, which he would later relate in his popular law lectures.

Cribbet then decided to attend the University of Illinois College of Law where he received his J.D. degree in 1947. He spent a few months in law practice in Bloomington, Illinois, at the law firm of Costigan, Wollrab, and Yoder before he was invited back to the University of Illinois to teach law. As a professor, he held visiting positions at the University of Michigan Law School and the University of Texas School of Law. In 1967 he was appointed as dean of the law school, a position he held until 1979 when he was asked to serve as chancellor of the campus.

Cribbet was survived by his wife Betty; his two daughters, Pamela Steward and Carol Cribbet-Bell; five grandchildren; and seven great-grandchildren.

== Chancellorship ==
Cribbet was named acting chancellor on July 1, 1979, after William P. Gerberding left the position for the presidency of the University of Washington. The University of Illinois Board of Trustees formally named Cribbet as chancellor in December of that year. At the time of Cribbet's appointment University President Stanley O. Ikenberry had positive words for the new Chancellor. He stated Chancellor Cribbet "[would] bring to the position of chancellor extensive experience as an academic leader, what [he had] found to be an extraordinary soundness of judgment, and an absolutely superb reputation in his profession." For his part, the new chancellor told the press that he would strive to "strengthen the voice" of students and faculty in campus governance.

=== Termination of Gary Moeller ===
While still in his capacity as acting chancellor, Cribbet was involved in the decision to terminate Illinois Football head coach Gary Moeller after the coach posted a disappointing 6-24-3 record in three seasons. The Illinois athletic director, Neale Stoner, made the recommendation to terminate Moeller, a recommendation which was later approved by the university's board of trustees in an 8-1 vote. Prior to the vote, Moeller met with Chancellor Cribbet and President Ikenberry and pleaded for his job. A bitter Moeller called the decision "unfair to everyone in the program." Moeller also chided the decision for not coinciding with the university's educational mission. Chancellor Cribbet and Stoner would later oversee the hiring of Mike White after a search that included future Illinois football coach John Mackovic as a candidate.

=== David Wilson Eligibility Case ===
During his chancellorship, Cribbet reluctantly oversaw another athletics dispute that would threaten Illinois' membership in the Big Ten Conference. The dispute involved the eligibility of quarterback David Wilson. The Big Ten had charged Illinois with misrepresentation, deception, lack of cooperation, and failing to comply with conference rules. It sanctioned the Illinois athletics program with a ban in postseason competition in all sports and the loss of conference revenues. Illinois football coach Mike White and Athletic Director Neale Stoner reportedly threatened to resign if the university did not defend itself against the charges. The university vigorously responded with a 34-page rebuttal denying any wrongdoing. Chancellor Cribbet attributed some of the problems to the university's large bureaucracy; operational staff made innocent, unintentional errors in petitions and materials that were not known to university officials. He would lament: "I had high hopes of being able to make some contribution to the solution to the many troubling problems [in intercollegiate athletics] surfacing in the mass media. Now I fear I shall be known, in athletic circles, only as the chancellor who was involved in the Wilson case, a fact which truly saddens me."

== Selected works ==
- Property: Cases and Materials (with Corwin W. Johnson, Roger W. Findley, Ernest E. Smith, and John S. Dzienkowski) a seminal textbook now in its ninth edition.
- Principles of the Law of Property (with Corwin W. Johnson) a popular textbook that spawned three editions.
- Concepts in Transition: The Search for a New Definition of Property, 1986 University of Illinois Law Review 1.
- Changing Concepts in the Law of Land Use, 50 Iowa Law Review 245 (1964).
- Condominium: Home Ownership for Megalopolis?, 61 Michigan Law Review 1207 (1963).
- Conveyancing Reform, 35 N.Y.U. Law Review 1291 (1960).

Academic offices
Preceded by William P. Gerberding	Chancellor of the University of Illinois at Urbana-Champaign; 1979–1984	Succeeded by Thomas Eugene Everhart
