= Phyllis Wise =

Biomedical researcher

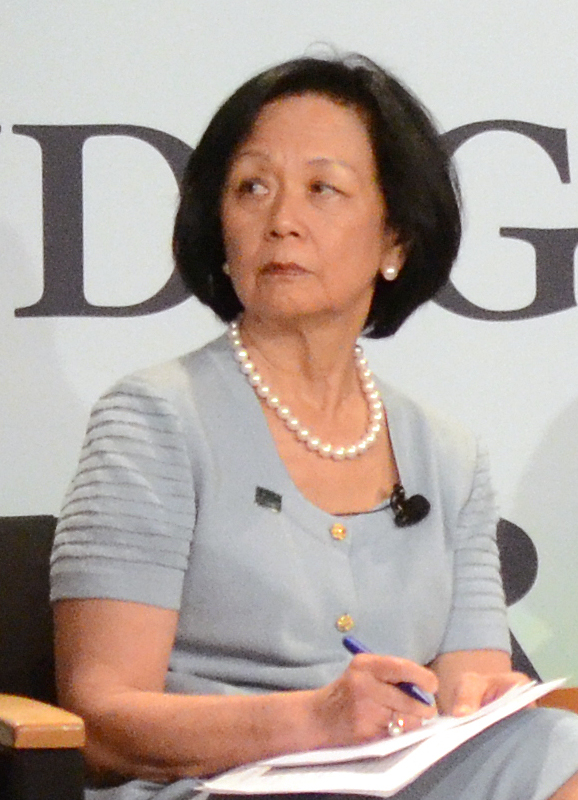
- Wise in 2012

9th Chancellor of the University of Illinois at Urbana-Champaign
- In office 2011–2015
- Preceded by: Richard Herman
- Succeeded by: Robert J. Jones

Interim President of the University of Washington
- In office 2010–2011
- Preceded by: Mark Emmert
- Succeeded by: Michael K. Young

Personal details
- Parents: Shih-Chun Wang (father); Mamie Wang (mother)
- Education: Swarthmore College (BA); University of Michigan (PhD)
- Scientific career
- Fields: Biomedical sciences
- Workplaces: University of Maryland, Baltimore; University of Kentucky; University of California-Davis; University of Washington; University of Illinois at Urbana-Champaign
- Thesis: Functional development of the hypothalamo - hypophyseal - adrenal cortex axis in the chick embryo, gallus domesticus (1972)

Phyllis Mary Wang Wise (Chinese: 王斐丽) is an American biomedical researcher. In 2016, she accepted a position as the inaugural chief executive officer and president of the Colorado Longitudinal Study.

== Family and education ==
Wise is the daughter of Mamie Wang and Shih-Chun Wang.

Wise received a bachelor's degree in biology from Swarthmore College in 1967, an M.A. (1969) and then a doctorate (1972) in zoology from the University of Michigan. She was a postdoctoral fellow there from 1972 to 1974.

== Career ==
=== University professor ===
In 1976, Wise was appointed assistant professor of physiology at the University of Maryland, Baltimore. In 1993, she was appointed professor of physiology and chair of the department at the University of Kentucky in Lexington, Kentucky. In 2002, she became dean of the College of Biological Sciences at University of California-Davis, holding also the rank of distinguished professor of neurobiology, physiology and behavior in its College of Biological Sciences, and professor of physiology and membrane biology in its School of Medicine.

=== University of Washington ===
Starting in 2005, Wise served as provost and vice president for academic affairs at the University of Washington. Later, she held the position of interim president there in 2010–2011. During her service at the University of Washington, she led the establishment of the College of the Environment.

=== University of Illinois at Urbana-Champaign ===
From 2011 to 2015, Wise served as chancellor of the University of Illinois at Urbana-Champaign. She led the establishment of a unique engineering-driven college of medicine aimed toward training the next generation of doctors to use technology and big data to develop new materials, new devices, new imaging, and new robotics to provide better medical care to more people at lower cost. In August 2015, Wise resigned the chancellorship at Urbana-Champaign, and, shortly after, university administrators released emails Wise had hidden from Illinois Freedom of Information Act requests regarding the Steven Salaita hiring controversy.

== Memberships and honors ==
She is a member of the National Academy of Medicine, and the American Academy of Arts and Sciences, and is also a Fellow of the American Association for the Advancement of Science and the American Physiological Society. She was a member of the board of directors of Nike and First Busey Corporation. She serves on the RAND Health, the Robert Wood Johnson Foundation, and Colorado Children's Hospital boards of directors.

She was awarded honorary degrees from Swarthmore College (2008) and the University of Birmingham (2015).

Academic offices
Preceded by Mark Emmert	President of the University of Washington; 2010–2011; Interim	Succeeded by Michael K. Young
Preceded by Robert A. Easter; Acting	Chancellor of the University of Illinois at Urbana-Champaign; 2011–2015	Succeeded by Barbara J. Wilson; Acting
