= John F. Sutton Jr. =

American lawyer and academic

John F. Sutton Jr. (January 26, 1918 - April 19, 2013) was an American lawyer and academic. He served as the A. W. Walker Centennial Chair Emeritus and Dean at the University of Texas School of Law. He was a fellow of the American Bar Association and a member of the State Bar of Texas.
