= Kyndra Rotunda =

- Born: c. 1973 (age 52–53)
- Education: University of Wyoming (BA, JD)
- Occupations: law professor, lawyer, US Army officer, author
- Spouse: Divorced 2014
- Military career
- Branch: United States Army
- Rank: Major

Kyndra Kaye Rotunda (née Miller, born c. 1973) is an American lawyer, author, and former Major in the United States Army Judge Advocate General's Corps. She is a law professor at the Chapman University School of Law.

== Education ==
She attended the University of Wyoming from 1992 to 1999, receiving a B.A. (1996) and a J.D. (1999) from the University of Wyoming College of Law.

== Career ==
From 2000 through 2003, Rotunda served on active duty as an officer in the United States Army Judge Advocate General's Corps and then served in the Individual Ready Reserve until 2008. She held the rank of Major in the Army. She is notable for her military service related to Guantanamo Bay, first as a Legal Advisor to the Guantanamo Detention Camp Commander, later as a legal advisor to the Department of Defense Criminal Investigation Task Force, then as a Prosecutor for the Guantanamo Military Commissions. In 2008, she published a book about her experience, titled Honor Bound: Inside the Guantanamo Trials. Rotunda is also the author of a Law School Textbook entitled Military & Veterans Law, published by Thomson West Publishing, 2011.

From 2003 to 2005, Rotunda was the Wyoming State Planning Coordinator and served as a legal and policy advisor to then-Governor, and headed up the Governor's policy team. Dave Freudenthal.

In 2006, she became a law professor at the George Mason University School of Law, where she was the Director of a pro bono law clinic for military personnel and veterans.

In 2008, Rotunda and her then-husband Ronald Rotunda joined a list of former faculty of George Mason University who took positions at the Chapman University School of Law. They divorced in 2014. She developed and heads the Chapman pro bono law clinic for military personnel and veterans. In 2009 was named as a lecturer at University of California, Berkeley, School of Law (Boalt Hall), where she assisted in starting a similar clinic which she now teaches.

Rotunda has written and spoken as an advocate for military troops. Rotunda's television interview on Dialogue with Doti and Dodge was awarded a Bronze Telly Award in 2009.

In September 2008, Rotunda testified before Congress about restoring the rule of law in Guantanamo Bay and various legal issues impacting the troops.

== Honor Bound: Inside the Guantanamo Trials ==
Honor Bound offers a behind the scenes look at the inner workings of the War on Terror, in the context of the personal narrative of a Judge Advocate. It received positive and negative critical notice.

=== Positive notice ===
Jacket blurbs included praise from scholars and litigators including former Solicitor General Theodore Olson who called it "immensely readable and stunningly valuable..." Former U.S. Attorney General Edwin Meese stated, "U.S. Army Captain (now Major) Kyndra Rotunda was at the center of the most important and controversial legal issues in the war, including the difficulties of detaining and prosecuting terrorists while traditional war is being redefined."

Harvard Law School Professor Alan Dershowitz said in a jacket blurb, "This eye-opening inside account must be read by everyone who cares about balancing national security and human dignity." Rotunda disagrees with Dershowitz on the topic of torture. Dershowitz maintains that the law should be introduced to permit civil judges to issue limited "torture warrant", under special circumstances, like the "ticking time bomb" scenario. In her book Rotunda generally rejects torture as a legitimate interrogation tactic and calls Dershowitz's "ticking time bomb" hypothetical "inherently imperfect because it assumes what we cannot know. If the detained does not disclose the information sought, is it because he truly does not know, or is it because the interrogator has not applied a sufficient amount of torture?"

=== Negative notice ===
Toronto Star reporter Michelle Shephard, author of Guantanamo's Child: The Untold Story of Omar Khadr critiqued five Guantanamo-related books, including Rotunda's Honor Bound which she called "... a poorly written personal account of an Army JAG that glosses over critical events in Guantanamo's history with offhand dismissals." Shephard continued, "There is some interesting legal stuff to ponder – such as how and why has the U.S. administration exceeded or sidestepped the protections of the international Geneva Conventions ...".

Specialist in Constitutional Law at the Library of Congress Louis Fisher wrote that as a Judge Advocate General's Corps officer, Rotunda had "a good opportunity to understand the military commissions underway at "Gitmo" and correct misconceptions about the procedures." About the book, he wrote, "For readers hoping for an even-handed assessment, the initial appearance is not promising." Fisher quotes Shepard's statement that the U.S. erred in "imposing rules that made it difficult for prosecutors to respond to defense counsel claims ...", and states that "The book never explains what constraints existed ...". Of Rotunda's statement that the U.S. erred by "giving detainees more rights than the Geneva Conventions require", Fisher states "They needed them. Unlike prisoners of war, who are released after a war and do not face trial, the detainees were subject to prosecution and possibly the death sentence".

== Comments on the Supreme Court's Boumedienne ruling ==
In June 2008 the Supreme Court overturned portions of the Detainee Treatment Act of 2005 and the Military Commissions Act of 2006. Rotunda authored an op-ed in the Chicago Tribune entitled "Supreme Court Ruling Puts Soldiers at Great Risk", which criticized aspects of the Supreme Court's ruling. In the years since the ruling Rotunda has appeared on numerous academic panels and has published several academic articles discussing, and analyzing, the Boumediene decision, and other decisions related to Guantanamo Bay.

In the National Review, Peter Pham stated that Rotunda had more years of military service than all the nine Supreme Court Justices put together. According to Pham, Rotunda's position was that:

... military commanders must justify battlefield captures and prove to a U.S. judge that decisions they made on the ground—in a faraway land during a battle—were justified ... [the decision] puts American troops at risk and will lead to more U.S. deaths on the battlefield because it makes it more difficult for soldiers to detain the enemy.

== 2008 Testimony before a Senate Judicial Subcommittee ==
In September 2008 Rotunda testified before a subcommittee of the United States Senate's Judicial Committee. In her testimony Rotunda cited incidents where U.S. prison guards were attacked by detainees and where U.S. officials, contrary to U.S. and International Law, made some areas "off limits" to U.S. guards maintaining detention camps. She discussed one incident in Camp Bucca, Iraq, which led detainees to attack from the inside out and resulted in a bloody four-day standoff. Rotunda supported religious freedoms for detainees, but opined that making prison areas and detainee personal items "off limits" to searches by U.S. prison guards has led to violence and has put guards at risk. She also pointed-out that it was contrary to U.S. Law. In her testimony before Congress, Rotunda also criticized the U.S. Army for limiting the duties of female military police officers serving in Guantanamo Bay, arguing that the U.S. Military should allow female and male officers alike to perform their duties without imposing limitations based on gender.

According to one military police officer who served in Guantanamo Bay, detainees brandish their home-made shanks to threaten U.S. troops, and then quickly shove them back into the Qu'ran, where they know are "off limits" to guards. Even in this situation, the guard may not touch the Qu'ran to confiscate the weapon.

== 2011 Muslim Headscarf Controversy ==
In March 2011, Rotunda weighed in on a controversy over whether their superiors should have encouraged female GIs in Afghanistan and Iraq to wear Muslim head-scarves while deployed to Iraq. stating that anyone familiar with military culture understood this suggestion was tantamount to an order, which inappropriately put female GIs at risk.

On April 8, 2011, in a Chicago Tribune op-ed about those risks, Rotunda triggered controversy. Rotunda pointed out that photographs, released by the U.S. Military and published in the Washington Post, showed women wearing headscarves, in lieu of helmets, while on an armed patrol alongside male troops, who were wearing helmets.

Military spokesman Lieutenant Colonel Michael Lawhorn disputed Rotunda's safety claims, stating that a helmet could be worn over top of a headscarf.

According to Rotunda, the objections from Lieutenant Colonel Martha McSally, a female fighter pilot stationed in Saudi Arabia, had influenced Congress to pass an "anti-abaya law". But Rotunda said the 2003 law was specific to female GIs stationed in Saudi Arabia, and that it had expired. She recommended that Congress reauthorize a similar law to protect female troops in the Iraq and Afghanistan Wars.

== Litigation ==
Rotunda became involved in high-profile legal issues and litigation stemming from the Iraq and Afghanistan Wars. In 2003, she was a lawyer assigned to Private Jessica Lynch after Lynch's rescue in Iraq.

In December 2011, Rotunda took on the U.S. Air Force for its allegedly illegal termination of 157 Air Force Officers on the eve of retirement. On December 28, 2011, Rotunda exposed the Air Force in a Wall Street Journal op-ed entitled The Air Force Grounds Its Officers, stating, "This holiday season, the Air Force has 'separated' (that is, fired) 157 officers on the eve of their retirement, including pilots flying dangerous missions, to avoid paying their pensions." She goes on to urge Congress to enact a law that would provide pro-rated retirement to these 157 officers and comments, "America's heroes have our backs. Who has theirs?"
