= Jack Peltason =

Jack Walter Peltason
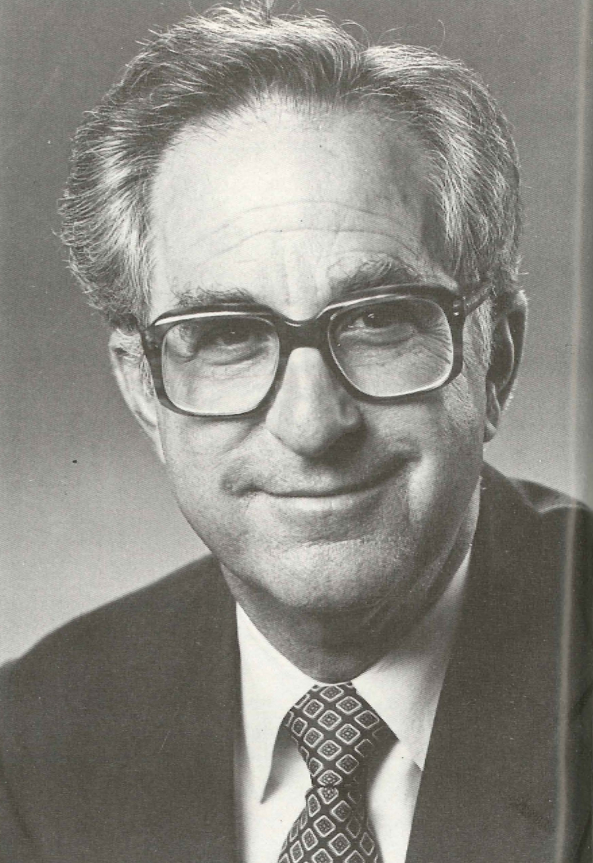

16th President of the University of California
- In office 1992–1995
- Preceded by: David P. Gardner
- Succeeded by: Richard C. Atkinson

2nd Chancellor of the University of California, Irvine
- In office 1984–1992
- Preceded by: Daniel Aldrich
- Succeeded by: Laurel Wilkening

1st Chancellor of the University of Illinois, Urbana-Champaign
- In office 1967–1977
- Succeeded by: Morton W. Weir

Personal details
- Born: August 29, 1923 St. Louis, Missouri, United States
- Died: March 21, 2015 (aged 91) Irvine, California, United States
- Education: University of Missouri; Princeton University
- Profession: University administrator, professor

Academic background
- Thesis: The battle of reconversion: A study of civil-military relations (1947)

Academic work
- Discipline: Political science
- Institutions: Smith College; University of Illinois Urbana-Champaign; University of California, Irvine

Jack Walter Peltason (August 29, 1923 – March 21, 2015) was the president of the University of California, and former chancellor of the University of California, Irvine. He died of Parkinson's disease in 2015.

Born in St. Louis, Missouri, Peltason was a member of the Smith College faculty from 1947 to 1951 and then joined the University of Illinois-Urbana faculty. He became dean of the College of Arts and Sciences in 1960. In 1964, he left Illinois to become vice president of academic affairs at the University of California, Irvine. In 1967, he returned to Illinois to become the first chancellor of the Urbana campus and stayed there until 1977 when he returned to Irvine.

Peltason served as president of political science honors society Pi Sigma Alpha from 1978 to 1980, and was also on the executive council of the society from 1970 to 1978.

Peltason served as UC president for the last three years of his long career. His relatively brief tenure was marked by two major controversies. First, in more prosperous times, UC had approved generous deferred compensation for its chancellors and other top executives which was no longer politically defensible during the early 1990s recession, and Peltason was forced to spend a great deal of time on the tasks of trimming back UC's executive salary and benefits programs and defending them to the public. Second, in 1994, Regent Ward Connerly and Governor Pete Wilson launched a campaign to prohibit the use of affirmative action in UC admissions. Despite strong opposition from Peltason and most UC senior executives (including UCSF associate dean and future UC President Michael V. Drake), Connerly and Wilson were able to persuade a majority of the Board of Regents to approve two resolutions to that effect on July 20, 1995.

Academic offices
New office	1st Chancellor of the University of Illinois at Urbana-Champaign; 1967–1977	Succeeded by Morton W. Weir; Acting
