= Naomi B. Lynn =

American Hispanic university administrator

- Born: April 16, 1933 (age 93); New York City, U.S.
- Education: Ph.D., Political Science, University of Kansas
- Occupation: Chancellor (retired)
- Title: Doctor
- Spouse: Robert Athan Lynn
- Children: Mary Lou Lynn; Judy Chance; Nancy Francis; Jo-An E. Lynn

Naomi Burgos Lynn (born 1933) was the first Hispanic woman president of an American public university. She served as president of Sangamon State University in Springfield, Illinois, beginning in 1991 and through its entrance into the University of Illinois system as the University of Illinois Springfield. She retired as chancellor of UIS in 2001. At her retirement the Naomi B. Lynn Distinguished Chair for Lincoln Studies was created at the University of Illinois Springfield, where Dr. Phillip Paludan served as its first recipient.

Born in New York City in 1933, Naomi Burgos was the daughter of Puerto Rican parents. Her sister, Ruth Burgos Sasscer, also became a university president, leading a community college in San Antonio, Texas. Naomi attended Maryville College in Maryville, Tennessee, where she met Robert Athan Lynn, whom she married in 1954. She received her Ph.D. in political science from the University of Kansas and went on to become a professor of political science, and then department head, at Kansas State University. She was also on the Kansas Social and Rehabilitation Review Commission. In 1988 she moved to Atlanta, Georgia, where she became the dean of the College of Public and Urban Affairs at Georgia State University.

She has served as president of the American Society for Public Administration, the National Association of Schools of Public Affairs and Administration, Pi Sigma Alpha and the Women's Caucus for Political Science. She has also served on the boards of the American Political Science Association, the American Association of State Colleges and Universities, the National Academy of Public Administration, and Maryville College.

She has authored several books including: The Fulbright Premise: Senator J. William Fulbright's Views on Presidential Power (1973), A Research Guide in Women's Studies (1974), and Public Administration: The State of the Discipline (1990). She also edited Women, Politics and the Constitution (1990). She has four daughters, Mary Lou, Nancy, Judy, and Jo-An. She also has ten grandchildren.

== Awards ==
Naomi Burgos Lynn was inducted as a Laureate of The Lincoln Academy of Illinois and awarded the Order of Lincoln (the State's highest honor) by the Governor of Illinois in 2012 in the area of Education.
