= John S. Dzienkowski =

American lawyer and academic

John S. Dzienkowski is an American lawyer and academic. He currently serves as the John F. Sutton Jr. Chair at the University of Texas School of Law.
