= Jennifer Mnookin =

American legal scholar (born 1967)

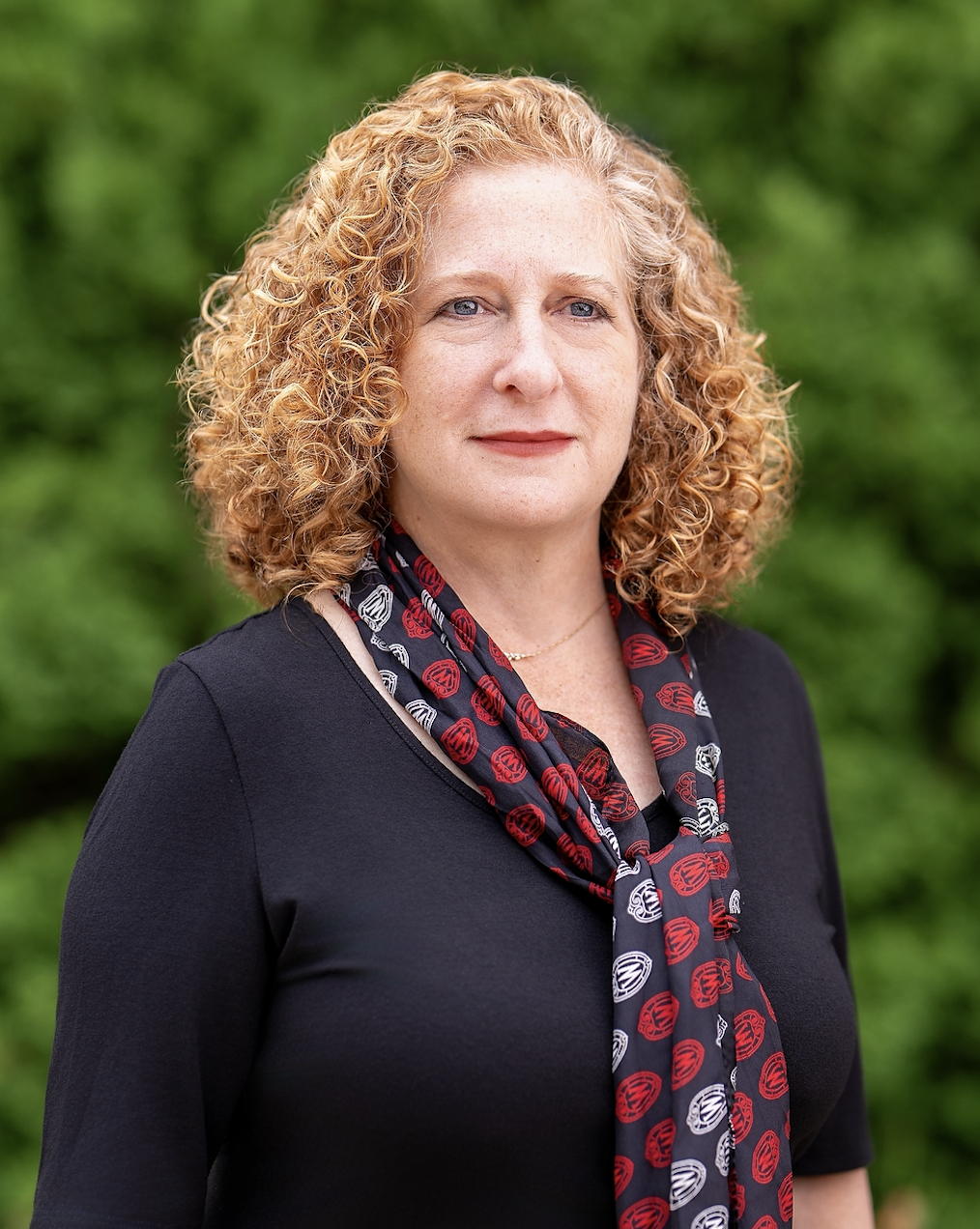
- Mnookin in 2025

21st President of Columbia University
- Incumbent
- Assumed office July 1, 2026
- Preceded by: Claire Shipman (acting)

30th Chancellor of the University of Wisconsin–Madison
- In office August 4, 2022 – May 17, 2026
- Preceded by: Karl Scholz (acting)
- Succeeded by: Eric Wilcots (acting)

Personal details
- Born: 1967 (age 58–59) Cambridge, Massachusetts, U.S.
- Education: Harvard University (BA); Yale University (JD); Massachusetts Institute of Technology (PhD)

Academic background
- Thesis: Images of Truth: Evidence, Expertise, and Technologies of Knowledge in the American Courtroom (1999)
- Doctoral advisor: Michael Fischer

Academic work
- Discipline: Law
- Institutions: University of Virginia; University of California, Los Angeles; University of Wisconsin–Madison

Jennifer Leigh Mnookin (born 1967) is an American legal scholar who has been the 21st president of Columbia University since July 2026. She previously served as the 30th chancellor of the University of Wisconsin–Madison from 2022 to 2026 and served as dean of the UCLA School of Law from 2015 to 2022.

A graduate of Harvard University, she received her Ph.D. in the history and social study of science and technology from the Massachusetts Institute of Technology. During her career, she has published papers in Stanford and Virginia Law Reviews, and written editorials for media outlets such as The Washington Post. In 2020, she was elected to The American Academy of Arts and Sciences.

== Early life and education ==
Mnookin's 1984 senior yearbook photo at Gunn High School

Born in 1967 in Cambridge, Massachusetts, Jennifer Mnookin is the daughter of Dale Mnookin and Robert Mnookin, a professor emeritus at Harvard Law School. Her family is Jewish, and she was raised in San Francisco Bay Area, California.

Mnookin received a Bachelor of Arts degree from Harvard University in 1988, a Juris Doctor degree from Yale Law School in 1993, and a Ph.D. degree in the history and social study of science and technology from the Massachusetts Institute of Technology in 1999. She was an editor for The Harvard Crimson student newspaper when she was a college undergraduate.

== Career ==
From 1998 to 2005, Mnookin was on the faculty of the University of Virginia School of Law. She was a visiting professor at Harvard Law School from 2003 to 2004.

She joined the faculty of the UCLA School of Law in 2005, where she served as vice dean for faculty and research from 2007 to 2009, as vice dean for faculty recruitment and intellectual life from 2012 to 2013, and as dean from August 2015 to June 2022. Mnookin is the founder and a former faculty co-director of UCLA’s Program on Undergraduate Law, Science and Evidence.

Mnookin has been the chair of the AALS Section on Evidence and served as a member of its executive committee. Before teaching law, she held a Doctoral Fellowship at the American Bar Foundation from 1996 to 1998.

On April 23, 2020, she was elected to the American Academy of Arts and Sciences.

=== University of Wisconsin–Madison ===
On May 16, 2022, the Board of Regents of the University of Wisconsin System announced they had unanimously chosen Mnookin to be the chancellor of the University of Wisconsin–Madison. She took office on August 4, 2022.

Beginning in 2023, Mnookin promoted a series of "Deliberation Dinners", designed to foster civil dialogue around contentious issues among students, faculty, and staff. These events grew into a larger initiative launched in December 2025 called "The Wisconsin Exchange: Pluralism in Practice," encompassing a campus-wide program of workshops, fellowships, grants, and lectures.

In 2023, Mnookin also led the launch of Bucky’s Pell Pathway, which provides tuition for University of Wisconsin–Madison students who qualify for federal Pell Grants. A record 26% of students entering UW–Madison for the fall 2025 semester were Pell Grant recipients. The Wisconsin Tribal Education Promise, started by Mnookin, granted full tuition and cost-of-living expenses to about 100 Wisconsin residents who are members of tribal nations.

Mnookin speaking at The University of Wisconsin-Madison in September 2024

While Mnookin was praised by faculty, staff, and administration for critical advancements in university infrastructure, research expenditures, and financial assistance, she faced criticism from some students for her perceived lack of engagement with student groups and initial handling of protests against the Gaza War in the spring of 2024.

==== Gaza war protests ====
On April 29, 2024, students and community members established a Gaza war protest encampment on Library Mall. Mnookin designated campus leaders to meet with protest leaders and pledged to meet with protesters personally when the tents, which were in violation of state law, were removed.

On May 1, 2024, Mnookin authorized campus police to dismantle the encampment. They were assisted by the Madison Police Department, the Dane County Sheriff's Office, and Wisconsin State Patrol. There were 34 arrests.

Following the arrests, protesters reinstated the camp. Mnookin met with student protest leaders on May 2 and ultimately reached a compromise with pro-Palestinian students that led them to remove their encampment on May 10.

=== Columbia University ===
Following the resignation of Minouche Shafik related to the April 2024 Gaza Solidarity Encampment and broader protest movement at Columbia University, the interim presidencies of Katrina Armstrong and Claire Shipman, and the university's $221 million settlement with the Trump administration, the university's Board of Trustees announced on January 25, 2026, that Mnookin would be the incoming 21st president of Columbia University. She became president on July 1, 2026, after agreeing to serve an initial five-year term.

== Research ==
Mnookin's scholarship focuses on the interconnections between evidence, science and technology, and legal and cultural ideas about proof and persuasion. She is a co-author of The New Wigmore, A Treatise on Evidence: Expert Evidence. Much of her work has focused on the problems of forensic science evidence, especially pattern identification evidence like latent fingerprint identification.

Mnookin has been published in the Stanford Law Review, the Virginia Law Review, and the Yale Journal of Law & the Humanities. She has authored editorials for The Washington Post, The Boston Globe, and Chicago Tribune.

Mnookin's research on forensic science was cited extensively by the National Academy of Sciences's 2009 report. She is a former member of the National Academy of Science's Committee on Science, Technology and the Law and is on the advisory board of the Electronic Privacy Information Center. She was the primary investigator for a National Institute of Justice project that sought to develop objective metrics for measuring the difficulty of fingerprint comparisons. Her work on the Confrontation Clause was cited and discussed by the Supreme Court of the United States in Williams v. Illinois (2012). In 2016, she co-chaired an advisory group to the President's Council of Advisors on Science and Technology, which issued a report on the reliability of forensic science used in the courtroom.

== Personal life ==
Mnookin married Joshua Foa Dienstag in 1994. Dienstag is a professor of political science at Columbia University. They have two children.

In December 2020, Mnookin donated one of her kidneys to her father, who had end-stage kidney disease. The kidney transplant was successful.
