= Michael Aiken =

American sociologist and academic (1932–2025)

6th Chancellor of the University of Illinois at Urbana-Champaign
- In office July 1, 1993 – August 20, 2001
- Preceded by: Morton W. Weir
- Succeeded by: Nancy Cantor

27th Provost of the University of Pennsylvania
- In office 1987–1993
- Preceded by: Thomas Ehrlich
- Succeeded by: Marvin Lazerson

Personal details
- Born: August 20, 1932 El Dorado, Arkansas, U.S.
- Died: August 25, 2025 (aged 93) Cody, Wyoming, U.S.
- Spouse: Catherine Comet
- Children: 1
- Education: University of Mississippi; University of Michigan
- Profession: Sociologist, academic

Michael T. Aiken (August 20, 1932 – August 25, 2025) was an American sociologist and academic who was the 6th chancellor at the University of Illinois at Urbana-Champaign and provost at the University of Pennsylvania.

== Education ==
Aiken received his bachelor's from the University of Mississippi in 1954 and his master's degree from the University of Michigan in 1955, and respectively his Ph.D. in 1964.

== Career ==
Aiken's career spans across multiple universities. After earning his Ph.D., Aiken was a professor at the University of Wisconsin from 1963 to 1984. He was promoted to full professorship in 1970. He was Chair of the Department of Sociology at the University of Wisconsin from 1976 to 1979 and Associate Dean, College of Letters and Science from 1980 to 1982. While at Wisconsin, Aiken held visiting professor positions at 1967–68 Columbia University, 1982–83 Washington University in St. Louis, and three visiting professorships in Belgium: 1969–71, Katholieke Universiteit de Leuven; 1973 Universite Catholique de Louvain; and Fall 1982–83 Universite Catholique de Louvaina in Belgium.

In 1984–85, Aiken was a chair of the sociology department at the University of Pennsylvania. A year later, he was named the dean of the School of Arts and Sciences where he was from 1985 to 1987. From 1987 to 1993 he was provost of the University of Pennsylvania.

In 1993 Aiken was appointed the sixth chancellor of the University of Illinois at Urbana-Champaign and remained until June 2001. Under his leadership, the Grainger Engineering Library was dedicated, and the university made efforts to create a research park. In addition, Aiken recommended that Chief Illiniwek be removed as a mascot from the university.

== Death ==
Aiken died in Cody, Wyoming, on August 25, 2025, at the age of 93.

Academic offices
Preceded by Morton W. Weir	Chancellor of the University of Illinois at Urbana-Champaign; 1993–2001	Succeeded by Nancy Cantor
