= Morton W. Weir =

American experimental psychologist and academic (born 1934)

Interim President of Knox College
- In office October 1, 1998 – December 31, 1998
- Preceded by: Rick Nahm
- Succeeded by: Richard S. Millman

5th Chancellor of the University of Illinois at Urbana–Champaign
- In office April 14, 1988 – June 30, 1993
- Preceded by: Morton W. Weir
- Succeeded by: Michael Aiken
- In office Acting: August 21, 1987 – April 13, 1988
- Preceded by: Thomas Eugene Everhart
- Succeeded by: Morton W. Weir

Acting Chancellor of the University of Illinois at Urbana–Champaign
- In office August 2, 1977 – December 31, 1977
- Preceded by: Jack Peltason
- Succeeded by: William P. Gerberding

Personal details
- Education: Knox College; University of Texas at Austin
- Profession: University administrator, professor

Academic background
- Thesis: The effects of instructions and expected number of trials on children's probability learning (1959)
- Doctoral advisor

Academic work
- Discipline: Psychology
- Institutions: University of Illinois

Morton W. Weir, born July 18, 1934, in Canton, Illinois, is an experimental psychologist and academic. After earning a BA from Knox College and an MA and PhD from the University of Texas at Austin, he joined the department of psychology at the University of Illinois at Urbana-Champaign in 1960 and subsequently served in a number of administrative capacities, retiring from the chancellorship in 1993.

== Education ==
Weir graduated cum laude from Knox College in 1955 as a pre-medicine major. In 1958, he received an M.A. in experimental psychology from University of Texas at Austin and his Ph.D. a year later in the same field.

== Career ==
Weir was a professor of psychology at the University of Illinois at Urbana-Champaign for 33 years. In addition, he served there as head of the department of psychology, as vice chancellor for academic affairs, vice president for academic affairs, interim chancellor, and chancellor. On leave from the University of Illinois, he served as director of the Center for the Study of Youth Development, Boys Town, Nebraska (1979–80) and after retirement from administration at the University of Illinois, served as interim president of Knox College (1998–99) and as senior foundation representative, University of Illinois Foundation (1993–2000). His research and scholarship included learning and problem solving with children, behavioral genetics, and social policy. He served on a number of editorial boards of scientific journals; the National Research and Evaluation Advisory Committee, Project Head Start; the Developmental Behavioral Sciences Study Section, National Institutes of Health; commissioner and president, North Central Association of Colleges and Schools; and on a number of other professional boards and committees. He was awarded an Alumni Achievement Award and an honorary Doctor of Laws from Knox College; the Reading Recovery Teacher Leader Award; the William Winter Award for Service by the University of Illinois Foundation and a Foreign Service Award from the Foreign Ministry of Japan.

Academic offices
Preceded by Jack Peltason	Chancellor of the University of Illinois at Urbana-Champaign; 1977; Acting	Succeeded by William P. Gerberding
Preceded by Thomas Eugene Everhart	Chancellor of the University of Illinois at Urbana-Champaign; 1987–1993	Succeeded by Michael Aiken
