= Thomas Eugene Everhart =

American academic administrator

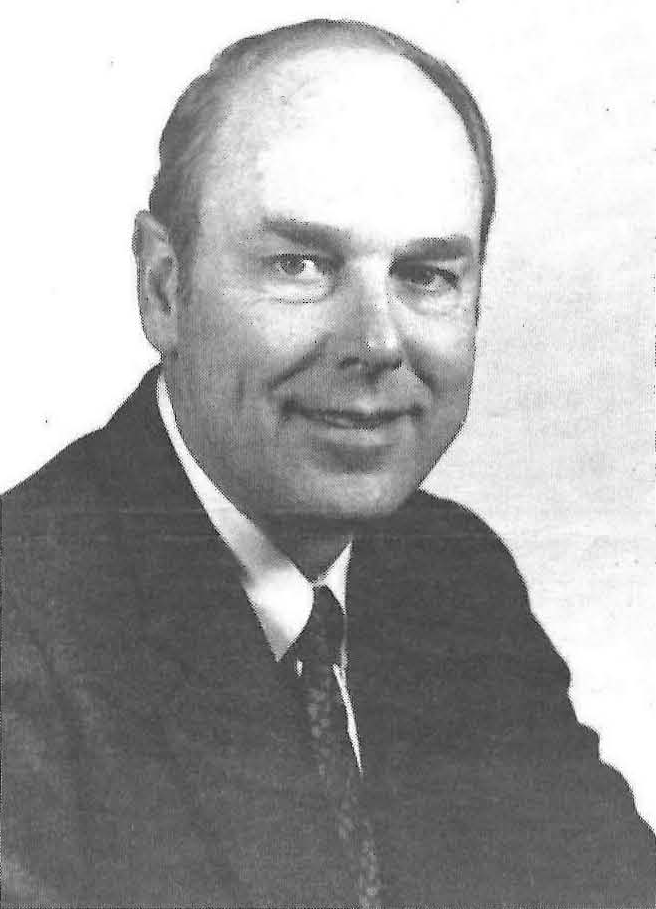
- Everhart in 1987

5th President of the California Institute of Technology
- In office 1987–1997
- Preceded by: Marvin Goldberger
- Succeeded by: David Baltimore

4th Chancellor of the University of Illinois at Urbana-Champaign
- In office 1984–1987
- Preceded by: John E. Cribbet
- Succeeded by: Morton W. Weir

Personal details
- Born: February 15, 1932 (age 94) Kansas City, Missouri, U.S.
- Education: Harvard University (BA); University of California, Los Angeles (MS); Clare College, Cambridge (PhD)
- Scientific career
- Awards: Marshall Scholarship (1955); IEEE Centennial Medal (1984); Clark Kerr Award (1992); ASEE Centennial Medallion (1993); IEEE Founders Medal (2002); Okawa Prize (2002)
- Fields: Electrical Engineering, Applied Physics
- Workplaces: University of California, Berkeley, Cornell University, University of Illinois at Urbana-Champaign, California Institute of Technology, University of Cambridge
- Thesis: Contrast formation in the scanning electron microscope (1958)
- Doctoral advisor: Charles Oatley

Thomas Eugene Everhart FREng (born February 15, 1932, in Kansas City, Missouri) is an American university president, educator, and physicist. His area of expertise is the physics of electron beams. Together with Richard F. M. Thornley he designed the Everhart–Thornley detector. These detectors are still in use in scanning electron microscopes, even though the first such detector was made available as early as 1956.

Everhart was elected a member of the National Academy of Engineering in 1978 for contributions to the electron optics of the scanning electron microscope and to its use in electronics and biology. He was appointed an International Fellow of the Royal Academy of Engineering in 1990. He served as chancellor of the University of Illinois at Urbana-Champaign from 1984 to 1987 and as the president of the California Institute of Technology from 1987 to 1997.

== Early life and education ==
Everhart's parents were William E. Everhart and Elizabeth A. West. Everhart received his A.B. in physics from Harvard University in 1953, and his M.S. in applied physics from the University of California, Los Angeles, in 1955. He held a Marshall Scholarship at Clare College, Cambridge, where he completed a PhD in physics under Professor Charles Oatley in 1958.

== Career ==
=== Everhart-Thornley detector ===
Everhart began working on electron detection and the design of scanning electron microscopes (SEMs) as a student with Charles Oatley at Cambridge in 1955. An initial prototype, the SEM1, had been developed by Dennis McMullen, who published his dissertation Investigations relating to the design of electron microscopes in 1952. It was further modified by Ken C. A. Smith, who developed a way to efficiently detect low-energy secondary electrons. Oatley and his students used SEM to develop a variety of new techniques for studying surface topography.

Everhart developed techniques to detect low-energy secondaries. His Ph.D. thesis, in 1958, was Contrast formation in the scanning electron microscope. Analyzing the electrons detected by the SEM, he reported that about 67% of the signal measured could be attributed to low energy secondaries from the specimen. About 3% was due to higher-energy reflected electrons. He also presented equations to model the noise introduced.

Use of the term "voltage contrast" to describe the relationship between the voltage applied to a specimen and the resulting image contrast, is attributed to Everhart. As of 1959, Everhart produced the first voltage-contrast images of p-n junctions of biased silicon diodes. Voltage contrast, the ability to detect variations in surface electrical potentials on a specimen, is now one of several imaging modes used for the characterization, diagnosis and failure analysis of semiconductors. As many as half of the SEMs sold are believed to be used in semiconductor applications.

Everhart studied contrast mechanisms in detail and developed a new theory of reflection of electrons from solids. He also made some of the first quantitative studies of the effects of beam penetration on image formation in the SEM.

In 1960 Everhart and Richard F. M. Thornley published a description for the improved design of a secondary electron detector, since known as the Everhart–Thornley detector. Everhart and Thornley increased the efficiency of existing detectors by adding a light pipe to carry the photon signal from the scintillator inside the evacuated specimen chamber of the scanning electron microscopes to the photomultiplier outside the chamber. This strengthened the signal collected and improved the signal-to-noise ratio. In 1963, Pease and Nixon incorporated the Everhart-Thornley detector into their prototype for the first commercial SEM, later developed as the Cambridge Scientific Instruments Mark I Stereoscan. This type of secondary electron and back-scattered electron detector is still used in modern scanning electron microscopes (SEMs).

By using various types of detectors with SEM, it becomes possible to map the topography, crystallography and composition of specimens being examined. In the 1960s, Wells, Everhart, and Matta built an advanced SEM for semiconductor studies and microfabrication at Westinghouse Laboratories in Pittsburgh. They were able to combine signals so to more effectively examine multiple layers in active devices, an early example of EBIC imaging.

=== University of California, Berkeley ===
From 1958-1978 Everhart was a professor and later department chairman of electrical engineering and computer science (EECS), at the University of California at Berkeley. There he supported the construction of the first scanning electron microscope in a U.S. university.

=== Cornell University ===
In January 1979, he became Joseph Silbert Dean of the college of engineering at Cornell University, Ithaca, New York.

=== University of Illinois ===
Everhart served as chancellor of the University of Illinois at Urbana-Champaign from 1984 to 1987. As chancellor, Everhart was involved in proposals for and development of the Beckman Institute for Advanced Science and Technology, an interdisciplinary research institute substantially funded by an appeal to Arnold Orville Beckman. In a formal invitation to proposed members of the Administrative Committee for the Beckman Institute, Everhart wrote that creation of the Beckman Institute was "an exceptional opportunity, perhaps the most dramatic and exciting one that we will see in our working lifetimes."

=== California Institute of Technology ===
Everhart was president of the California Institute of Technology from 1987 to 1997. As Caltech's president, Everhart authorized the Laser Interferometer Gravitational-Wave Observatory (LIGO) project, a large-scale experiment that seeks to detect gravitational waves and use them for fundamental research in physics and astronomy.

While at Caltech, Everhart was involved in substantial expansion of the university, heading a $350-million fund-raising drive. In 1989, he helped dedicate the Beckman Institute at Caltech, a research center for biology, chemistry, and related sciences. It was the second of five research centers supported by Arnold Orville Beckman and his wife Mabel. Everhart also was involved in the development of the W. M. Keck Observatory in Hawaii, supported by the W. M. Keck Foundation; the Gordon and Betty Moore Laboratory of Engineering, supported by Gordon Moore of Intel; and the Fairchild Engineering Library, supported by the Sherman Fairchild Foundation.

Everhart promoted efforts to hire more female faculty and increase the enrollment of women. In his final year at Caltech the number of women in the freshmen class was double that of the year he joined Caltech.

Since 1998, Everhart has served as a trustee of the California Institute of Technology. He sits on the boards of directors of Raytheon and the Kavli Foundation, among others.

=== Harvard University ===
In 1999, Everhart was elected to a six-year term as Overseer of Harvard University. In 2001 he became a member of the Overseers executive committee. He was one of three overseers who participated in the university's presidential search committee in 2000-01. In 2004, he was elected president of Harvard's Board of Overseers for 2004-05.

== Awards and honors ==
Everhart has been elected to a number of scientific societies, including the following:

- 1969, Fellow, Institute of Electrical and Electronics Engineers
- 1977, President, Electron Microscope Society of America
- 1978, Member, National Academy of Engineering
- 1984, Scientific Member, Böhmische Physical Society
- 1988, Fellow, American Association for the Advancement of Science
- 1990, Foreign Member, Royal Academy of Engineering

Everhart has received a number of awards, including the following:

- 1955, Marshall Scholarship
- 1984, IEEE Centennial Medal
- 1992, Clark Kerr Award
- 1993, ASEE Centennial Medallion
- 2002, IEEE Founders Medal
- 2002, Okawa Prize

Academic offices
Preceded by John E. Cribbet	4th Chancellor of the University of Illinois at Urbana-Champaign; 1984 – 1987	Succeeded by Morton W. Weir
Preceded by Marvin Goldberger	5th President of the California Institute of Technology; 1987 – 1997	Succeeded by David Baltimore
