= Marie Lynn Miranda =

American data scientist and academic administrator (born 1963)

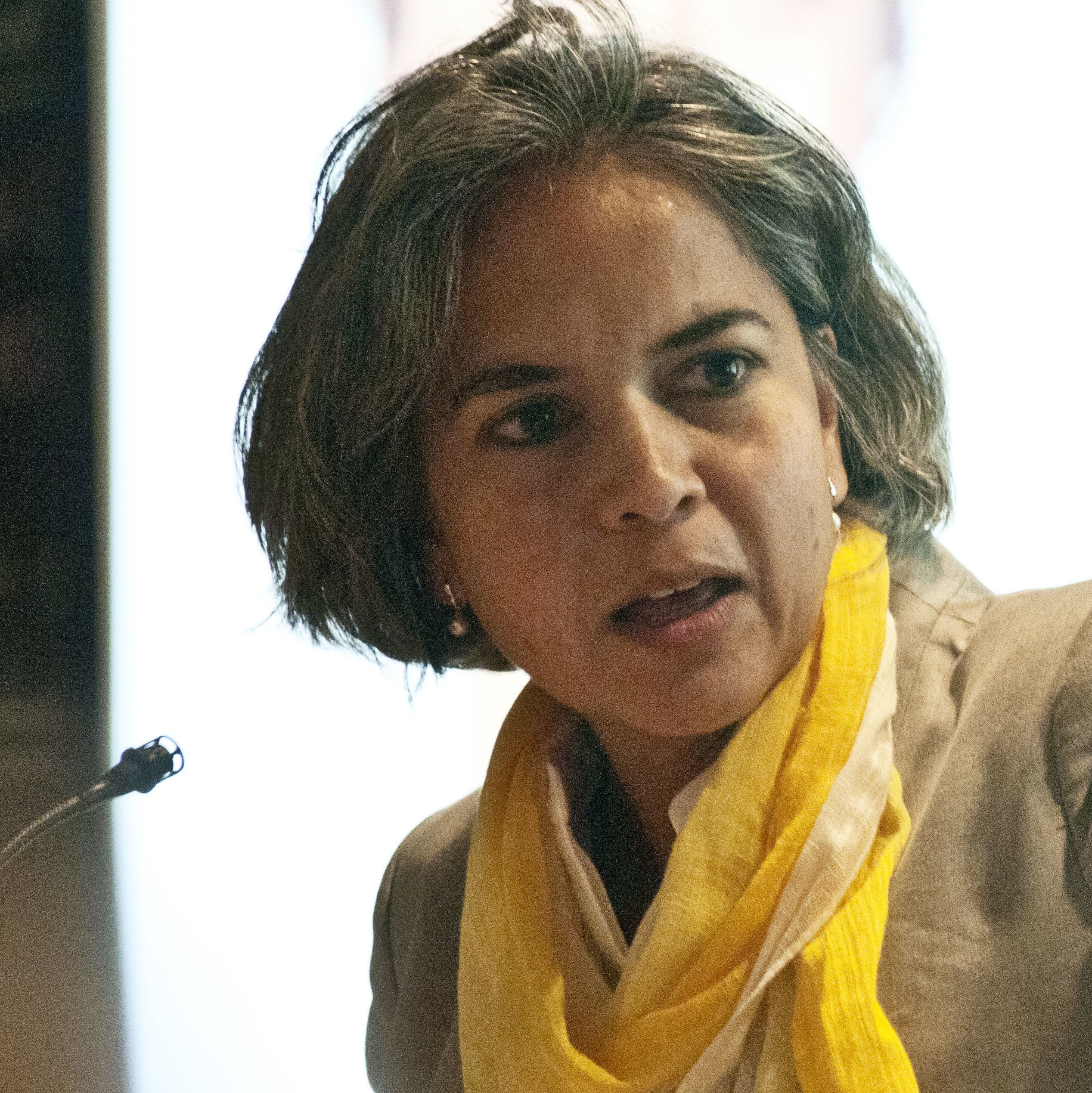
- Miranda in 2012

10th Chancellor of the University of Illinois Chicago
- Incumbent
- Assumed office July 5, 2023
- Preceded by: Javier Reyes (interim); Michael Amiridis

Personal details
- Born: 1963 (age 62–63) United States
- Children: 3
- Scientific career
- Education: Duke University (BA); Harvard University (MA, PhD)
- Fields: Economics; data science
- Institutions: Duke University; University of Michigan; Rice University; University of Notre Dame; University of Illinois Chicago
- Thesis: Essays on land management (1990)
- Doctoral advisor: C. Peter Timmer

Marie Lynn Miranda (born 1963) is an American economist, data scientist, and academic administrator. She became the tenth chancellor of the University of Illinois Chicago and a vice president of the University of Illinois System in July 2023. She previously served as provost and professor of applied computational mathematics and statistics at the University of Notre Dame. A self-taught toxicologist and environmental scientist, Miranda researches children's environmental health and geospatial health informatics. Her research through the Children's Environmental Health Initiative has informed CDC and EPA policy on childhood lead exposure. She is a Fellow of the American Association for the Advancement of Science and was recognized as a 2023 Woman of Note by Crain's Chicago Business.

== Early life and education ==
Miranda was born in 1963. She is the first member of her family to be born in the United States. In 1961, her parents and three brothers moved to South Bend, Indiana from Goa while her father, Constancio Miranda, was studying civil engineering. He was later a professor at the University of Detroit Mercy. She attended Catholic schools in Detroit. Miranda earned an A.B. in mathematics and economics, summa cum laude, from Duke University in 1985. She was inducted into Phi Beta Kappa at Duke University. She was also named a Truman Scholar. While attending Duke University, she worked as a student manager for the Duke Blue Devils men's basketball under coach Mike Krzyzewski. Miranda earned an M.A. (1988) and a Ph.D. in economics from Harvard University, where she held a National Science Foundation Graduate Research Fellowship. Her 1990 dissertation was titled, Essays on Land Management. Peter Timmer, Lawrence Goulder, and Jerry Green served on her doctoral committee.

== Career ==
Miranda joined the faculty at Duke University in 1990. She is a self-taught toxicologist and environmental scientist and joined Duke's integrated toxicology and environmental health program in 1999. Miranda was the founding director of the Children's Environmental Health Initiative (CEHI). For nine years, she was the director of undergraduate programs for the Nicholas School of the Environment. As a data scientist, her research focuses on geospatial health informatics.

From 2012 to 2015, Miranda was the Samuel A. Graham dean of the school of natural resources and environment at University of Michigan. With a quantitative methods background, she was a professor of pediatrics and obstetrics and gynaecology at Michigan Medicine.

Miranda was the Howard R. Hughes Provost and a professor of statistics at Rice University from 2015 to 2019. As provost, she led the university's academic, research, scholarly, and creative programs with a $700 million annual operating budget. She also directed the planning and implementation of $230 million in strategic investments. When Hurricane Harvey struck Houston in August 2017, Miranda led the university's initial emergency response and later established the Hurricane Harvey Registry to track the storm's long-term health and housing impacts on the greater Houston community.

From July 1, 2020, to December 31, 2021, Miranda was the Charles and Jill Fischer Provost of the University of Notre Dame. She succeeded Thomas G. Burish to become the first woman and person of color to serve in the position. She was also a professor of applied computational mathematics and statistics at Notre Dame.

In July 2023, Miranda became the tenth chancellor of the University of Illinois Chicago (UIC). In that capacity, she is also a vice president of the University of Illinois System. She also serves as a faculty member in both the Department of Pediatrics and the Department of Mathematics, Statistics, and Computer Science.

As chancellor, Miranda has articulated five institutional priorities for the University of Illinois Chicago:

1. Student success. The university's top priority is student success, with an emphasis on recruitment, retention, and graduation, while fostering a sense of belonging and connection among undergraduate, professional, and graduate students.
2. Research infrastructure. A second priority is strengthening research infrastructure to position UIC at the forefront of knowledge creation and discovery.
3. Community engagement. Miranda has identified engagement with UIC's surrounding community as a core priority, focused on expanding access to educational opportunities and clinical care in underserved communities to advance equity, efficiency, and sustainability.
4. Partnerships. Another priority is building partnerships with businesses and nonprofit organizations to expand faculty opportunities and strengthen student engagement, internships, and employment pathways.
5. Faculty and staff excellence. The final priority is recruiting and retaining outstanding faculty and staff, with an emphasis on ensuring that those who contribute to the university's success feel valued, supported, and motivated.

In December 2025, Miranda received the Chicago Bridge Award from Chicago United, which recognizes leaders advancing inclusive practices across business and community sectors in Chicago.

== Research and Impact ==
Miranda continues to direct the Children's Environmental Health Initiative (CEHI), which she founded in 1998. Her research focuses on geospatial health informatics and children's environmental health, with over 135 peer-reviewed publications and more than $65 million in federal, corporate, and foundation funding as principal or co-principal investigator.

CEHI's work on childhood lead exposure has had a significant policy impact. The initiative's research linking lead exposure to performance on standardized tests contributed to the CDC's decision to set a stricter standard for childhood blood lead levels. CEHI also identified lead in aviation gasoline as a contributor to elevated blood lead levels in children living near airports, with a landmark 2011 study published in Environmental Health Perspectives demonstrating associations between proximity to airports and higher childhood blood lead levels. This work informed ongoing policy discussions and the EPA's 2023 endangerment finding on leaded aviation gasoline.

In 2008, CEHI received the U.S. Environmental Protection Agency's Environmental Justice Achievement Award.

== Honors and Recognition ==
In 2019, Miranda was elected a Fellow of the American Association for the Advancement of Science. In 2023, she was named a Woman of Note by Crain's Chicago Business. In December 2025, she received the Chicago Bridge Award from Chicago United.

== Board Service and Professional Activities ==
Miranda serves on multiple national and regional boards, including the Doris Duke Charitable Foundation, the Environmental Defense Fund, the National Institute for Nursing Research, and the Executive Committee of the Board of Hispanic Serving Research Universities. She is also a member of the Board of the Chicagoland Chamber of Commerce, the Economic Club of Chicago, and The Chicago Network.

== Personal life ==
Miranda is married to Christopher Geron. They have three children, two English Setters, and roughly 500,000 honeybees.

== See also ==
- List of women in mathematics
