= Bernard White =

Bernard White may refer to:

- Bernard White Jr., state legislator in Indiana
- B. Joseph White (born 1947), president of the University of Illinois system
- Bernard White (actor) (born 1959), Sri Lankan-born American actor, screenwriter, and film director
