= Shield Illinois =

Unit of the University of Illinois System responsible for COVID-19 testing in Illinois

SHIELD Illinois
- Abbreviation: SHIELD IL
- Founders: Tim Killeen
- Founded at: Champaign-Urbana, Illinois
- Type: Governmental Organization
- Legal status: SHIELD Deployment Unit of the University of Illinois System
- Headquarters: Champaign-Urbana, Illinois
- Region served: Illinois, USA
- Services: SARS-CoV-2 testing and variant identification
- Managing Director: Ronald Watkins, Associate Vice President for Strategic Initiatives at the University of Illinois System
- Parent organization: University of Illinois System
- Website: www.shieldillinois.com

SHIELD Illinois was the SHIELD Deployment Unit of the University of Illinois System charged with administering the covidSHIELD SARS-CoV-2 assay throughout the State of Illinois. SHIELD Illinois performed over 7.2 million SARS-CoV-2 assays during its initial program. This represented 12% of all SARS-CoV-2 tests in Illinois and more tests than 24 entire states.

== History ==
=== Creation of the covidSHIELD assay and SHIELD Illinois ===
The University of Illinois at Urbana-Champaign (UIUC) faced a problem when the global spread of SARS-CoV-2 and COVID-19 led to the closure of its campus in April 2020. Campus leaders wanted to find a way to resume normal activities and realized that frequent, accurate testing of the community would be key. However, there was no existing test that was non-invasive, inexpensive, and quick enough to provide results in time for the campus to take action. UIUC decided to take on this challenge and within a few months, researchers had developed the covidSHIELD assay, a saliva-based PCR test that eliminated the costly and time-consuming RNA extraction step used in other SARS-CoV-2 tests. This fast, accurate, and affordable test allowed UIUC to start twice weekly testing of its entire campus population, which helped to reduce the positivity rate on campus and in the surrounding community. The success of the SHIELD program at UIUC led the University of Illinois System to offer this service to other entities in Illinois, resulting in the creation of the SHIELD Deployment Unit aka SHIELD Illinois.

To run this new startup, University administration tapped then Associate Dean for Strategy and Innovation at the Gies College of Business on the Urbana-Champaign campus, Ron Watkins. Watkins brought on board three former iMBA students to form the core team along with individuals loaned to SHIELD Illinois by other system units.

=== Expansion ===
SHIELD Illinois was originally intended to be a facilitator, assisting laboratories in preparing to use the covidSHIELD assay and advising colleges, universities, and other organizations on how to collect specimens. SHIELD Illinois would also provide the technology needed to transmit orders to the lab and results back to the collecting agency. It was estimated that the program would have 50 testing locations and collect 1.5 million tests over a six-month period. Over time, SHIELD Illinois's role expanded beyond its original advisory function, and it became involved in the logistics of running both laboratories and collection sites. However, the estimated number of labs and locations remained the same.

This changed in March 2021, when the University of Illinois System entered into an Intergovernmental Agreement with the Illinois Department of Public Health to offer testing to every school district, community college, and public university in Illinois, as well as community testing sites for the general public throughout the state. There are 853 school districts covering 3,977 with 1.9 million students in Illinois.

As of October 2022, the company had performed over 6.5 million tests at over 1,700 sites in Illinois, including the governor's office, the state legislature, and the United States District Court for the Northern District of Illinois; engaged 12 CLIA or CAP-certified laboratories; and built a transportation network covering 80,000 square miles. Tests performed by SHIELD Illinois represent 12% of all SARS-CoV-2 tests in Illinois and more tests than 24 entire states. To achieve this, SHIELD Illinois ultimately grew from a team of 30 to over 300 employees and more than 1,000 contractors.

=== Operation Expanded Testing ===
In October 2021, SHIELD and IDPH partnered with the United States Department of Health and Human Services' (HHS) Midwest COVID-19 Testing Coordination Center (MCC) to bring funding and resources from HHS "Operation Expanded Testing" to Illinois. This not only provided additional funding to Illinois but also provided testing to remote rural schools that previously were unable to manage the logistics of testing operations.

=== Program End ===
With the COVID-19 pandemic waning, SHIELD Illinois performed its last SARS-CoV-2 assay on June 30, 2023.

== Logistics ==
To meet the testing demand both in terms of turnaround times and specimens processed per day, SHIELD Illinois created an extensive logistics network consisting of The Depot (Chicagoland Central distribution hub), funnel sites (drop points for collection sites located far from The Depot or a central Illinois laboratory), a fleet of 40 vehicles, 12 geographically disparate labs, and a courier network covering 80,000 square miles.

=== Laboratory Network ===
- Gift of Hope Organ and Tissue Donor Network Laboratory (Itasca)
- HSHS St. Mary's Hospital Decatur, IL
- Illinois State University
- Loyola University Medical Center
- SHIELD Illinois Clinical Diagnostic Laboratory at UIC
- SHIELD Illinois COVID-19 Testing Lab (Springfield)
- SHIELD T3 Kentucky
- SHIELD T3 Madison
- SHIELD T3 UIC
- Simple Labs
- University of Illinois College of Medicine Rockford
- University of Illinois Urbana-Champaign Annex

== Impact ==
=== Lives Saved ===
A peer-reviewed research study published June, 2022 in the journal Nature Communications showed the effectiveness of fast/frequent testing using the novel low-cost and scalable saliva-based RT-qPCR assay for SARS-CoV-2 that bypasses RNA extraction called covidSHIELD reduced mortality in the community more than 4-fold relative to expected.

=== Test to Stay ===
SHIELD Illinois piloted the "Test to Stay" program developed in cooperation with the Illinois Department of Public Health. Later endorsed by the CDC, Test to Stay allows unvaccinated students, faculty, and staff who have been exposed to SARS-CoV-2 positive individuals to remain in the classroom providing they wear a mask and test on days one, three, five, and seven following exposure. This program prevented the need to quarantine and exclude entire classes when one student in the group tests positive. During the pilot period alone, which only covered a population of 1,035 students and staff, "8,152 learning days were saved among close contacts."

=== Back to Trials ===
In February 2019, SHIELD Illinois partnered with the United States District Court for the Northern District of Illinois to provide SARS-CoV-2 screening to jurors, attorneys, employees, and other courthouse visitors. The program required all jurors to test with SHIELD Illinois before reporting for voir dire while employees were tested weekly. This partnership allowed jury trials to resume in the Northern District while maintaining a safe and healthy working environment for everyone involved.

=== Back to the Capital - Illinois General Assembly ===
SHIELD Illinois started testing visitors, staff, and members of the Illinois General Assembly in January 2021 which coincided with the legislators' return to in-person attendance in Springfield for the legislative session. Testing was mandatory for non-vaccinated visitors and capitol staff. Testing was optional for members.

=== Oak Park River Forest High School Outbreak ===
After 17 new cases were diagnosed in one week, the Oak Park Health Department forced Oak Park River Forest High School to cancel all extracurricular activities on December 3, 2021 and hinted toward a future move to suspend in-person learning. Oak Park Public Health Director Dr. Theresa Chapple expressed concerns that "only about 100 to 200 students" were tested each week which left the department blind to the actual size of the outbreak. SHIELD Illinois was engaged by the district on Saturday, December 4 about the possibility of testing the entire school population in one day. SHIELD rallied every employee trained to collect specimens, including executive leadership, accounting specialists, and logistics team members. Monday, December 6, 2021, SHIELD Illinois collected specimens from 1,651 students, faculty, and staff. This initial round of testing identified 20 positive patients. The health department allowed extracurricular activities to resume on December 7, 2021. SHIELD Illinois repeated the same process on December 9. This time testing 1,396 faculty, staff, and students--identifying an additional 3 positive cases.

=== Reopening Chicago Public Schools ===
While SHIELD Illinois provided free SARS-CoV-2 testing to most school districts throughout Illinois and submitted a proposal to test Chicago Public Schools ("CPS"), CPS ultimately chose Massachusetts-based Thermo Fisher Scientific as its testing vendor. Despite this, when logistical issues related to the Omicron surge led to test result delays, 25,000 specimens rejected as invalid, and a vote by the Chicago Teachers Union ("CTU") to postpone the start of school in January 2022, SHIELD Illinois provided CPS with SHIELD's entire stockpile of over 300,000 rapid antigen tests. This allowed CPS to achieve testing levels at which CTU felt comfortable returning to the classroom and get the 340,000 students in CPS back into the classroom.

=== Incubator Lab Facility Investment ===
When SHIELD Illinois consolidated its labs into two University-owned and operated facilities to optimize logistics during the 2021-2022 school year. The Incubator Lab Facility on the University of Illinois Chicago (UIC) campus, the building where SHIELD Illinois's NextGen sequencing and innovation lab was located, was not originally built to meet the criteria of a CLIA-certified clinical diagnostics lab. So, the program decided to invest in upgrading the facility to bring it up to modern standards. According to Len Musielak, SHIELD Illinois Senior Director of Operations, SHIELD wanted to not only upgrade the building for its purposes but also add in ways that would provide a benefit to other tenants now and far into the future. The project included $2.2 million in upgrades and had a six-week deadline to complete the most difficult tasks and make the lab operational.

Facility upgrades included:

- Upgrading an existing 35-kilowatt generator to a brand new 200-kilowatt unit.
- Completely gutting and refinishing three laboratory spaces, which included:
  - Removal of original built-in casework and replacement with modular units that can be moved to fit changing workflows.
  - Replacement of fluorescent lighting with high-efficiency LED panels.
  - Replacement of flaking epoxy floors with brand-new laboratory-grade finish.
  - Addition of auxiliary cooling units for each space to provide the humidity and temperature control required to perform high complexity assays.
  - Installation of new dedicated circuits tied into backup power via a new generator.
- Restoration and upgrade of the existing HVAC system

The new lab was completed on August 1 and became operational on August 24.

=== Air purifier distribution ===
On Friday, July 21, 2023, Illinois Governor JB Pritzker and the Illinois Department of Public Health announced they were partnering with SHIELD Illinois to distribute air purifiers to licensed Illinois Day Care outside of the city of Chicago. The purifiers were purchased with $10 million of federal funds through the CDC's Epidemiology and Laboratory Capacity for Prevention and Control (ELC) Reopening Schools Program. SHIELD Illinois will use the extensive logistics capabilities developed serving over 2,300 locations during the pandemic to distribute the filters across the state.

== Legacy ==
=== Clinical Laboratory Development Program ===
The work of SHIELD Illinois will continue through the Clinical Laboratory Development Program powered by SHIELD Illinois ("CLDP"). Utilizing the state-of-the-art laboratory renovated by SHIELD Illinois at the University of Illinois Chicago, CLDP will address the critical shortage of qualified clinical laboratory personnel in Illinois. The goal of the program is to develop the next generation of laboratory technicians and scientists through hands-on training and work experience.

=== Equipment loan program ===
Upon the conclusion of the SHIELD Illinois testing program, laboratory equipment and other hard assets were offered to public entities throughout the State of Illinois at no cost with the understanding that, should another pandemic occur, the equipment would be used however necessary to continue the mission of SHIELD Illinois to keep Illinois open.

=== Research funding ===
In March 2023, SHIELD Illinois hosted a COVID-19 research symposium to spotlight the vital role of research in confronting future public health emergencies. In addition to seminars and speakers, researchers had the opportunity to apply for funding from SHIELD Illinois for projects related to SARS-CoV-2 and COVID-19.
