= List of presidents of the University of Illinois System =

President of the University of Illinois System

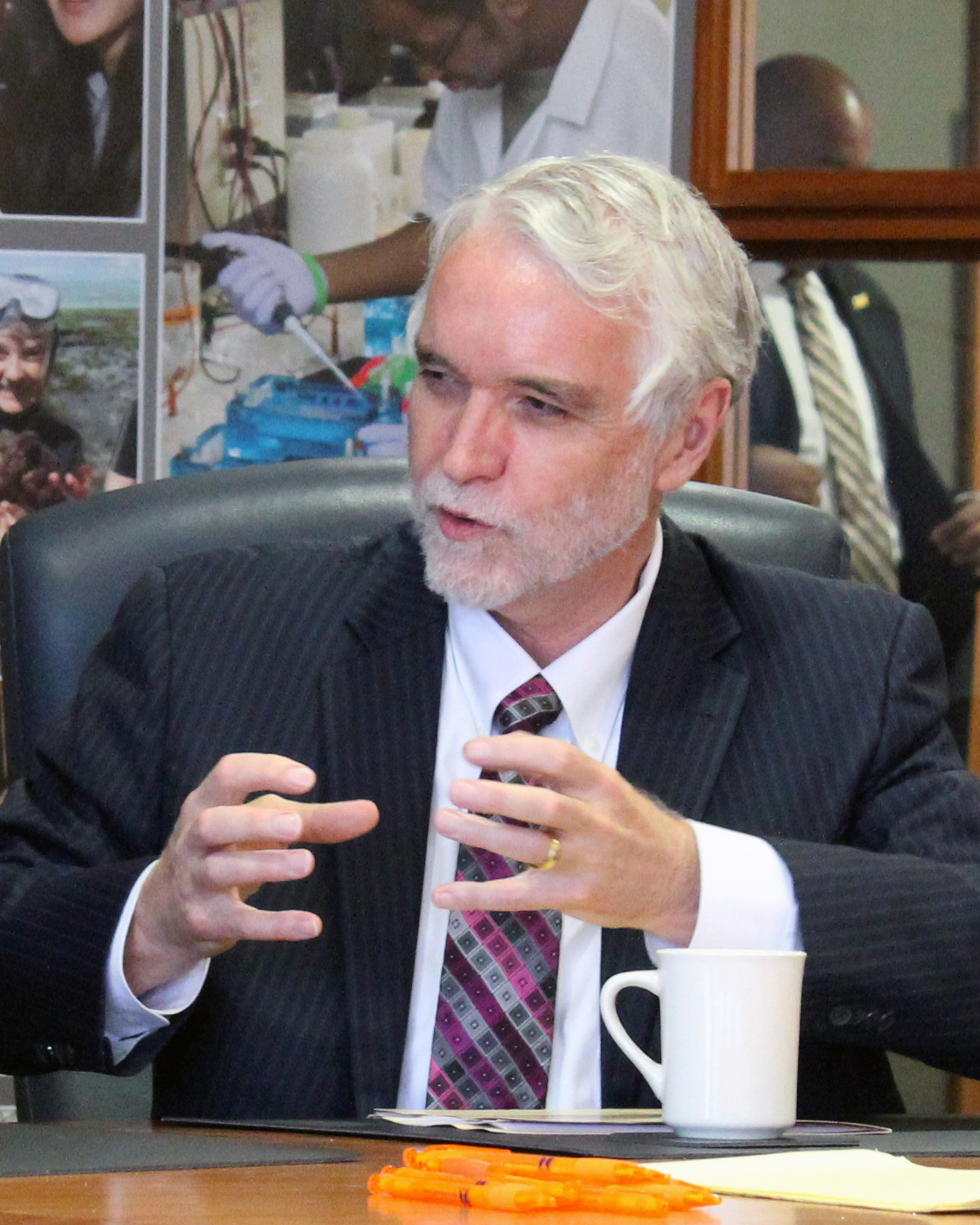
- Incumbent; Timothy L. Killeen since May 18, 2015
- Appointer: Board of Trustees
- Term length: No term limit
- Inaugural holder: John Milton Gregory
- Formation: March 12, 1867 (159 years ago)
- Salary: US$935,105.28 as of August 2025
- Website: www.uillinois.edu/president/

The president of the University of Illinois System, a system of public universities in Illinois, is the chief executive officer and a member of the faculty of each of its colleges, schools, institutes, and divisions. The president is elected by the University of Illinois Board of Trustees and is responsible to them for the operation of the system. The president prepares budgets for presentation to the board, recommends persons to the board for appointment to university positions, and is responsible for the enforcement of the rules and regulations of the universities. On recommendation of each university and by authority of the trustees, the president issues diplomas conferring degrees. Following the establishment of the office in 1867, John Milton Gregory served as the first president, and there have been 20 presidents in total. The current president is Timothy L. Killeen, who has held the position since May 18, 2015.

On March 12, 1867, during the first meeting of the Board of Trustees of Illinois Industrial University (the original name of the university system), the trustees established the office of the president. The original charter designated the chief executive officer of the university as "Regent" but this title was changed to "President" in 1894 following the end of Thomas Jonathan Burrill's term.

Up until 1967, the president also served as the principal administrator of the original Urbana-Champaign campus. In June 1966, at the recommendation of president David D. Henry, the board switched to a chancellorship system of administration. The change established a new administrative office, the "Chancellor of the University of Illinois Urbana-Champaign", and renamed the two administrators of the Chicago campuses, vice president of the University of Illinois at the Medical Center and vice president of the University of Illinois at Chicago Circle, to chancellor. The two Chicago campuses were later consolidated in 1982 to form the University of Illinois Chicago. The chancellors of each campus are appointed by the board following nomination by the president and perform duties that are assigned by the president.

== List of presidents ==
List of presidents
Presidency (Note: The University of Illinois System numbers its presidents according to uninterrupted periods served by the same person, including acting and interim presidents. For example, Stanley Ikenberry was the 14th and 17th president, despite being "interim president-designate" during his second term. The university system numbers Michael Hogan as the 18th president. Serving as acting president for one year before his official term, Lloyd Morey is numbered simply as the 11th president.)		President		Notes
1	1867–1880	John Milton Gregory	John Milton Gregory	Gregory was previously the president of Kalamazoo College.
2	1880–1891	Selim Peabody	Selim Peabody	
3	1891–1894	Thomas Jonathan Burrill	Thomas Jonathan Burrill	Burrill served as acting regent (and was the last to use the title Regent).
4	1894–1904	Andrew S. Draper	Andrew S. Draper	Draper resigned to become the first Commissioner of Education of the State of New York.
5	1904–1920	Edmund J. James	Edmund J. James	James was previously the president of Northwestern University.
6	1920–1930	David Kinley	David Kinley	Kinley was previously the president of the American Economic Association.
7	1930–1933	Harry Woodburn Chase	Harry Woodburn Chase	Chase was previously the president of the University of North Carolina and resigned to become the president of New York University.
8	1933–1934	Image of Arthur H. Daniels not available	Arthur H. Daniels	Daniels served as acting president.
9	1934–1946	Arthur Cutts Willard	Arthur Cutts Willard	
10	1946–1953	Image of George D. Stoddard not available	George D. Stoddard	Stoddard was previously the president of the University of the State of New York. The University of Illinois Board of Trustees removed him through a vote of no confidence.
11	1953–1955	Image of Lloyd Morey not available	Lloyd Morey	Morey was an alumnus of the University of Illinois Urbana-Champaign and worked in the administration throughout and after his studies. He served the first year of his tenure as acting president.
12	1955–1971	Image of David D. Henry not available	David D. Henry	Henry was previously the president of Wayne State University and executive vice chancellor of New York University.
13	1971–1979	John E. Corbally	John E. Corbally	Corbally was previously the chancellor of Syracuse University and resigned to become the president of the MacArthur Foundation.
14	1979–1995	Stanley O. Ikenberry	Stanley O. Ikenberry	Ikenberry resigned to become the president of the American Council on Education.
15	1995–2005	James J. Stukel	James J. Stukel	Stuckel is an alumnus of the University of Illinois Urbana-Champaign.
16	2005–2009	B. Joseph White	B. Joseph White	White resigned as a result of a clout scandal.
17	2010	Stanley O. Ikenberry	Stanley O. Ikenberry	Ikenberry's title during this period was "interim president-designate".
18	2010–2012	Michael Hogan	Michael Hogan	Hogan was previously the president of the University of Connecticut and resigned amid controversy over his leadership.
19	2012–2015	Image of Robert A. Easter not available	Robert A. Easter	Easter is an alumnus of the University of Illinois Urbana-Champaign and led a 40-year career as a faculty member and administrator of the campus.
20	2015–present	Timothy L. Killeen	Timothy L. Killeen	

== Timeline of presidencies ==
Gregory (1867–1880)
Peabody (1880–1891)
Burrill* (1891–1894)
Draper (1894–1904)
James (1904–1920)
Kinley (1920–1930)
Chase (1930–1933)
Daniels* (1933–1934)
Willard (1934–1946)
Stoddard (1946–1953)
Morey (1953–1954, 1954–1955)
Henry (1955–1971)
Corbally (1971–1979)
Ikenberry (1979–1995, 2010)
Stukel (1995–2005)
White (2005–2009)
Hogan (2010–2012)
Easter (2012–2015)
Killeen (2015–)
│
1867
│
1877
│
1887
│
1897
│
1907
│
1917
│
1927
│
1937
│
1947
│
1957
│
1967
│
1977
│
1987
│
1997
│
2007
│
2017
Presidents of the University of Illinois System (1867–present)
*Interim/acting president

== See also ==
- List of chancellors of the University of Illinois Chicago
- List of chancellors of the University of Illinois Springfield
- List of chancellors of the University of Illinois Urbana-Champaign
