= Robert A. Easter =

American animal scientist

19th President of the University of Illinois System
- In office July 2, 2012 – May 17, 2015
- Preceded by: Michael Hogan
- Succeeded by: Timothy L. Killeen

Personal details
- Born: October 23, 1947 (age 79) La Pryor, Texas, US
- Education: Texas A&M University (BA)(MA); University of Illinois Urbana-Champaign (PhD)

Military service
- Branch/service: United States Army Reserve
- Years of service: 1972–1992
- Rank: Major
- Scientific career
- Fields: Animal science
- Workplaces: University of Illinois Urbana-Champaign
- Thesis: Evaluation of dietary arginine, histidine, leucine and tryptophan for pregnancy in swine (1976)
- Doctoral advisor: D.H. Baker

Robert A. Easter (born October 23, 1947) is an American animal scientist and university professor who served as the 19th president of the University of Illinois system from 2012 until 2015.

== Early life and education ==
Easter was born on October 23, 1947 in southwest Texas, where he was raised on a grain and livestock farm in La Pryor. His grandfather was a homesteader.

Easter graduated from La Pryor High School in 1966. From there, he enrolled in Texas A&M University, planning on pursuing a career in law. However, after working with legislators one summer, he was convinced by a colleague to focus on his knowledge of swine and agriculture.

In 1970, Easter graduated from Texas A&M with a bachelor's degree in Agriculture Education before continuing his education at A&M earning a master's degree in Animal Nutrition.

In the winter of 1973, Easter and his wife Cheryl traveled to Urbana, Illinois for Easter to pursue a PhD program at the College of Agriculture, Consumer, and Environmental Sciences (ACES) at the University of Illinois Urbana-Champaign. The couple planned to return to Texas once Robert's PhD program was complete. Easter earned his PhD in Animal Science in 1976.

As a graduate student, Easter excelled, catching the attention of the college's faculty. When a lecturer left Illinois to take a job at Purina, the position was offered to Easter, who declined a position at Texas A&M to take the spot at Illinois. The faculty member who left was recruited by then-executive at Purina, Ed McMillan, who would later become chair of the University of Illinois' Board of Trustees in 2015.

== Academic career ==
Freshly out of graduate school, Easter began his career at the University of Illinois in the fall semester of 1976 as an Assistant Professor in the Department of Animal Sciences. By 1987, Easter had been promoted to a full professor, and 7 years later, in 1995, he was named the head of the Department of Animal Sciences. As department head, he played a major role in the construction of the Funk Agriculture library.

Easter's research focused on swine agriculture, and in 1997, he co-authored a book on the pork industry of China, an agricultural staple he traveled to study most summers during his tenure at Illinois.

In 2002, Easter was named as dean of the College of ACES.

In 2006, President George W. Bush appointed Easter to the Board for International Food and Agriculture Development (BIFAD), of which he became chair the following year.

In 2023, Easter was made an Honorary Prairie Farmer Master Farmer.

== Planned retirement and subsequent administrative career ==
In 2009, Easter, planning to retire, resigned as dean. But at his retirement party, Easter was approached by University Chancellor Richard Herman who asked him to stay at the University as interim Provost. Then-Provost Linda Katehi was planning to leave the university to take another position, leaving an opening. Easter agreed.

Within months, the University of Illinois faced a major scandal within its admissions process. Lists of "Category I" applicants (applicants with connections to university VIPs who received priority consideration) were leaked. The fallout of the scandal led the majority of the Board of Trustees to resign, along with the University's president and Chancellor Herman, who had recruited Easter. Just months after he forwent retirement, Easter was asked, again, to take on an interim position; this time as Chancellor.

Easter remained as interim Chancellor until mid-2011, when Phyllis Wise was hired into the position. Wise then asked Easter, once more, to stay at the University in an interim position, as the vice chancellor for research. Easter took the job on January 1, 2012.

Within weeks, the University was rocked by yet another scandal that saw the University's President resign under fire for the second time in a little over three years. Then-president Michael Hogan informed board chair Chris Kennedy that he planned to resign after his staff was accused of interfering with faculty governance, and he failed to survive a faculty vote of no-confidence. Kennedy turned to Easter to fill the position, who took over immediately as President-Designate. On July 1, 2012, Easter officially became the 19th University of Illinois system president.

Easter remained president until May 17, 2015, successfully retiring six years later than he had originally planned. He was succeeded by Timothy L. Killeen.

== Personal life ==
Easter served as an Officer in the Army Reserve for 20 years. Commissioned as a second lieutenant in 1972, Easter traveled Washington, DC for weekend and summer assignments while working as a professor at the University. Easter retired from service in 1992 with the rank of Major.

Easter lives in Mahomet, Illinois with his wife Cheryl on an acreage with fruit trees. He has two sons, a daughter, and six grandchildren. In January 2012, Easter's son Aaron died in a snowboarding accident in Colorado, just weeks before he was asked to take the role of university president.
