= Millstone Hill =

Dish antenna

Millstone Hill Antenna
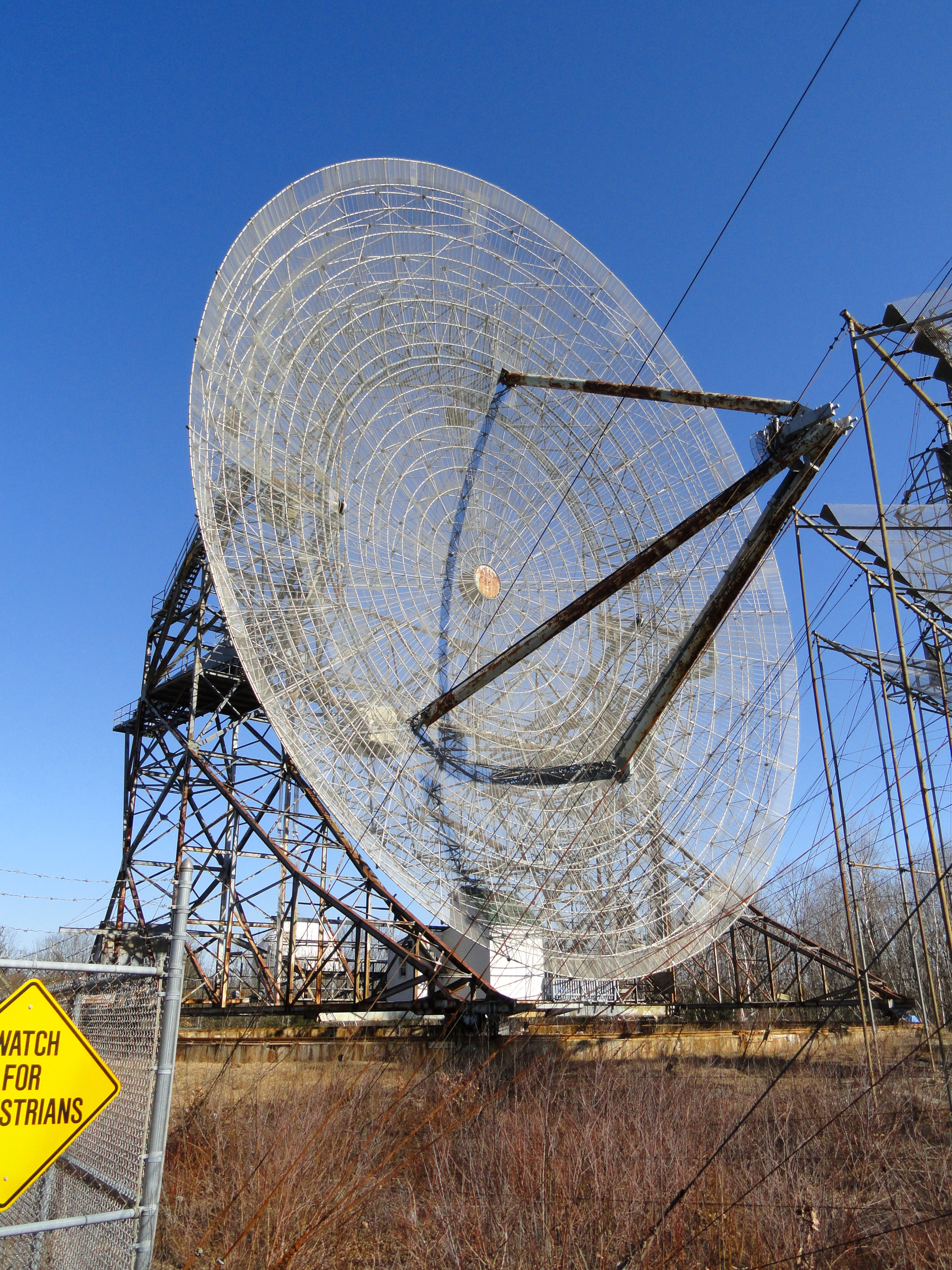
- Alternative names: Millstone Hill
- Location(s): United States
- Coordinates: 42°37′10″N 71°29′28″W
- Diameter: 150 ft (46 m)
- Location of Millstone Hill
- Related media on Commons

The Millstone Hill Steerable Antenna, or MISA, is a fully steerable dish antenna, 46 metres (151 ft) in diameter, designed by the Stanford Research Institute (SRI) in 1959. It is currently located at MIT Haystack Observatory in Westford, Massachusetts.

== History ==
MISA was originally installed at the Sagamore Hill Radio Observatory in Hamilton, Massachusetts in 1963. The antenna operated at that location until 1978, at which time it was relocated to Millstone Hill. Since that time it has been primarily used as a UHF radar antenna to provide measurements of the near space environment using the incoherent scatter radar technique. It is one of two surviving dish antennas of this type in the world with the other antenna being located at the Stanford University radio science field site in Stanford, California. MISA is used to provide wide radar coverage in latitude and longitude.

== Capabilities ==
MISA is a broad-based observatory capable of addressing a wide range of atmospheric science investigations. The incoherent scatter radar facility at Millstone Hill has been supported by the National Science Foundation since 1974 for studies of the Earth's upper atmosphere and ionosphere. During this time the facility has evolved from a part-time research operation sharing radar cooling and power supply elements with the M.I.T. Lincoln Laboratory Millstone satellite tracking radar, to a separately funded, operationally independent system dedicated to upper atmospheric research. The scientific capability of the Millstone Hill facility was greatly expanded in 1978 with the installation of a fully steerable 46 meter antenna to complement the 67 meter fixed zenith pointing dish.

The favorable location of Millstone Hill at sub-auroral latitudes combined with the great operational range afforded by the steerable antenna permit observations over a latitude span encompassing the region between the polar cap and the near-equatorial ionosphere. Since 1982 the Haystack Observatory Atmospheric Sciences Group has been supported for operating the Millstone Hill research radar as a part of the incoherent scatter radar chain and for associated studies of the auroral and sub-auroral ionosphere and thermosphere. The meridional radar chain extends from Sondrestrom Upper Atmospheric Research Facility in Kangerlussuaq, Greenland through Millstone Hill at mid-latitudes, beyond Arecibo at low latitudes, to the Jicamarca facility at the magnetic equator in Peru. The radar chain forms an integral part of the NSF-supported CEDAR (Coupling, Energetics, and Dynamics of Atmospheric Regions) observing network and Millstone Hill observations and analysis have contributed extensively to the successes of the CEDAR initiative.

== Scatter technique ==
The Millstone Hill Radar uses Thomson backscatter from ionospheric electrons to deduce height- and time-resolved plasma drift velocities, electron and ion temperatures, electron densities, ion composition, and ion-neutral collision frequencies. These parameters provide further information about the neutral gas, neutral temperatures and winds, and electric fields present in the medium. The incoherent scatter technique provides observations of many of these parameters over an altitude range extending from less than 100 km to a thousand kilometers or more. Methods have been developed that allow these measurements to be made with an altitude resolution of hundreds of meters. The complete steerability of the radar allows horizontal gradients and structure to be examined along with vertical variations.

== See also ==
- Stanford Dish
- Sugar Grove Station
