= Michael Hogan (academic) =

American academic and historian (born 1943)

Michael J. Hogan
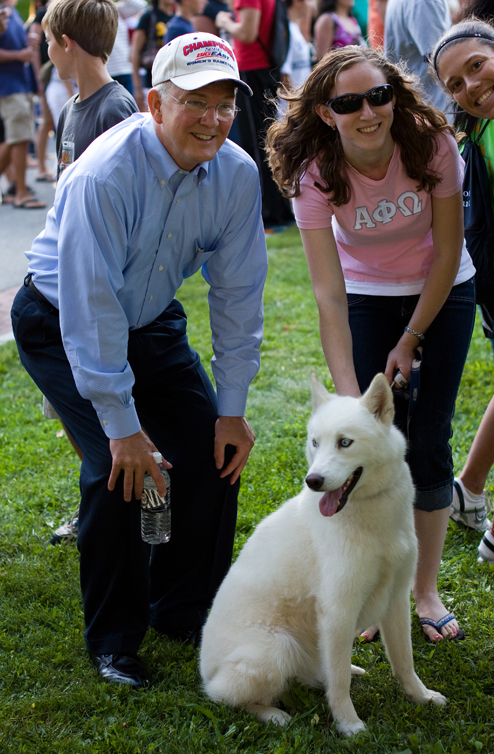

18th President of the University of Illinois system
- In office July 1, 2010 – July 1, 2012
- Preceded by: Stanley O. Ikenberry
- Succeeded by: Robert A. Easter

14th President of the University of Connecticut
- In office September 14, 2007 – June 30, 2010
- Preceded by: Philip E. Austin
- Succeeded by: Susan Herbst

Personal details
- Born: 1943 (age 82–83) Waterloo, Iowa, U.S.
- Education: University of Northern Iowa (BA); University of Iowa (MA); University of Iowa (PhD)
- Profession: Academic administrator; historian; professor

Michael J. Hogan (born 1943) is an American historian who served as president of the University of Connecticut (2007–2010) and president of the University of Illinois System (2010–2012). He subsequently became a distinguished professor of history at the University of Illinois at Springfield.

== Early life and education ==
Born and raised in Waterloo, Iowa, Hogan earned his B.A. degree at the University of Northern Iowa, where he majored in English with minors in history and classics. He received M.A. and Ph.D. degrees from the University of Iowa.

== Academic career ==
=== Teaching ===
Hogan's first university faculty positions were at Stony Brook University and at the University of Texas, Austin. He then taught at Miami University for nine years before accepting what would turn out to be his last full-time teaching position at Ohio State University, in 1986. In 1993, Hogan was elevated to be the chair of the Department of History at Ohio State, which position he held until he moved into the administrative side of academia.

=== Administration ===
In 1999, Hogan was made dean of the College of Humanities at Ohio State, and in 2001, he was given an additional position as executive dean of the Colleges of the Arts and Sciences. During his tenure in that position, the position of executive dean evolved into a separate free-standing office with oversight of five colleges and forty-one departments.

In 2003, Hogan accepted a position as Executive Vice President and Provost of the University of Iowa. While in Iowa City, he also held the position of F. Wendell Miller Professor of History.

==== University of Connecticut ====
On September 14, 2007, Hogan became the 14th president of the University of Connecticut, succeeding Philip E. Austin. As president, Hogan helped develop a $362 million plan to renovate and expand the University of Connecticut Health Center. Research spending grew by 25%, and academics and enrollment continued to pursue the upward trajectory established under President Austin.

Notwithstanding these successes, Hogan's tenure was brief and controversial. He refused to move into the official president's house in Storrs because his wife, Virginia, allegedly had a severe allergic reaction to mold and mildew there. So UConn paid $49,000 to rent and renovate a five-bedroom house near campus. He ordered a $475,000 renovation of the university's main administrative building, where he worked, and he hosted a costly inauguration ceremony for himself, complete with fireworks. Hogan even spent $3,500 of the university's money to have a number of life-size cardboard cutouts of himself placed around campus. Faculty and state legislators complained that he behaved autocratically.

On May 11, 2010, Hogan was selected to succeed B. Joseph White as president of the University of Illinois System, and he resigned his position as president of the University of Connecticut, effective June 30. Governor Jodi Rell was among many UConn supporters who complained about the abruptness of Hogan's departure, less than three years after taking the job. Hogan's was the briefest tenure of any UConn president since 1930.

==== University of Illinois System ====
President Hogan's tenure at the University of Illinois was filled with problems. At the start of his position at Illinois, Hogan has been criticized for big salary raises to the members of his administrative team at the time of severe budget problems for the university and the state. Hogan's starting salary at the University of Illinois was $620,000, which is $170,000 more than the salary of his immediate predecessor, B. Joseph White. Hogan also brought as his chief-of-staff, Lisa Troyer, who was given the initial salary of $195,000 per year, compared to the $107,500 salary of the executive assistant to Joseph White. Troyer had previously worked for Hogan both at Iowa and Connecticut.

In the summer of 2011, a university law employee was dismissed following evidence that he changed the grades of several students to make the U of I rank higher in the national standards.

During his time at Illinois, Hogan had an increasingly difficult relationship with the University of Illinois faculty, particularly at the Urbana-Champaign and Chicago campuses. Hogan spearheaded several initiatives that increased the powers of the University of Illinois President in relation to the three campuses and their chancellors, and increased the role of central university administration, in particular introducing a new vice-president position and expanding the role of several others. These changes were met with significant criticism by the faculty and by campus-level administrators. In April 2011, Sally Jackson, an Associate Provost at the Urbana-Champaign campus, resigned her position as the campus chief information officer, in protest of President Hogan's plans to make the chief information officers of the three University of Illinois campuses directly subordinate to the central university administration rather than to the campus provosts.

Hogan has been credited with putting together a university budget for the 2011–12 academic year that provided the first program of merit-based salary raises for the faculty since 2008.

In 2011 Hogan put forward a plan that would centralize many aspects of the admission process to the University of Illinois three campuses at the hands of the central university administration. Various aspects of the plan were criticized by the university faculty, particularly by the Senate of the Urbana-Champaign campus. Hogan was also criticized by the faculty by exerting what they saw as undue pressure on the campus chancellors to support his plan. His enrollment initiative plan was one that drew a lot of criticism from the university faculty. The plan consisted of changing the way in which students are admitted to the university, and possibly reverting to a common application. Much of the criticism circled around Hogan's initiative to have a common admission policy for all three campuses, even though the demographics of each campus are quite different. Hogan's initiative was never approved.

In December 2011, Lisa Troyer, who had been President Hogan's Chief-of-Staff, was accused of sending to the members of the university Senates conference committee an e-mail in support of Hogan's proposal with the signature at the end of the e-mail indicating that it was sent by a university Senator. Troyer denied the accusations, claiming that her email account was hacked. In January 2012, a subsequent investigation, conducted at the university's request by an external firm, concluded that the e-mail in question was indeed sent from Troyer's computer and that that computer had not been compromised.

Troyer then resigned as Hogan's Chief-of-Staff and later accepted a faculty position on February 6 in the psychology department on the Urbana-Champaign Campus. Troyer continued to maintain that she was innocent and that she did not send the fake e-mail.

Following the e-mail scandal, Hogan's leadership style came under increasing criticism by the university faculty. In late February 2012 a group of 130 leading faculty members at the Urbana-Champaign campus, including most endowed chairs, submitted a letter to the Board of Trustees calling for Hogan's quick removal as the University of Illinois President; this letter was followed by a similar letter from more than 100 distinguished professors in mid-March. These letters were the result of emails being released showing continued pressure from Hogan to the new Urbana-Champaign Chancellor, Phyllis Wise. In the released emails, Hogan indicated that he expected Wise to be an advocate for the Board of Trustees, rather than the Urbana-Champaign Campus directly and was disappointed that she did not display the type of leadership that he was looking for.

On March 22, 2012, Hogan resigned his position as President of the University of Illinois, effective July 1, 2012.

== Books authored or edited ==
A specialist in the history of American diplomacy, Hogan is the author or editor of nine books and a host of scholarly articles and essays. His publications include Informal Entente: The Private Structure of Cooperation in Anglo-America Economic Diplomacy, 1918–1928 (University of Missouri, 1977) and The Marshall Plan: America, Britain, and the Reconstruction of Western Europe, 1947–1952 (Cambridge, 1987), which received the Stuart L. Bernath Book Award of the Society for Historians of American Foreign Relations, the 1988 George Louis Beer Prize of the American Historical Association, and the Quincy Wright Prize of the International Studies Association. His most recent books include A Cross of Iron: Harry S. Truman and the Origins of the National Security State, 1945–1954 (Cambridge, 1998), and his edited volume, Paths to Power: The Historiography of American Foreign Relations to 1941 (Cambridge, 2000). He has worked on a history of his discipline, under contract with the University of Michigan Press, and on a book dealing with the Cold War in American history and memory.

In 2017, his book on President Kennedy titled The Afterlife of John F. Kennedy: A Biography was published by Cambridge University Press.

== Scholarship and service ==
President Hogan served for 15 years as editor of Diplomatic History, an international journal of record for specialists in diplomacy and foreign affairs. He has served on numerous editorial boards and as vice president and president of the Society for Historians of American Foreign Relations. He has also served on the U.S. Department of State Advisory Committee on Diplomatic Documentation, which he chaired for three years, and has worked as a consultant for a number of BBC documentaries and for the PBS special George C. Marshall and the American Century.

President Hogan has been a fellow at the Harry S. Truman Library Institute and the Woodrow Wilson International Center for Scholars, and has served as Louis Martin Sears Distinguished Professor of History at Purdue University. His scholarship has been recognized by the Society for Historians of American Foreign Relations, which awarded him the Bernath Lecture Prize in 1984, and by Ohio State University, which presented him with its Distinguished Scholar Award in 1990, the highest award for scholarly distinction conferred on members of the faculty.

== Personal life ==
Hogan and his wife Virginia have four adult children.

== Works ==
- Informal Entente: The Private Structure of Cooperation in Anglo-America Economic Diplomacy, 1918–1928, (1977)
- The Marshall Plan: America, Britain, and the Reconstruction of Western Europe, 1947–1952, (1987)
- A Cross of Iron: Harry S. Truman and the Origins of the National Security State, 1945–1954, (1998)
- Paths to Power: The Historiography of American Foreign Relations to 1941 (2000).
- The Afterlife of John F. Kennedy: A Biography, (2017)

Academic offices
Preceded by Philip E. Austin	14th President of the University of Connecticut; 2007–2010	Succeeded by Susan Herbst
Preceded by (permanent) B. Joseph White, (interim) Stanley O. Ikenberry	18th President of the University of Illinois; 2010–2012	Succeeded by Robert Easter
