= Arthur Willard =

Arthur Willard may refer to:

- Arthur Cutts Willard (1878–1960), president of the University of Illinois
- Arthur L. Willard (1870–1935), U.S. Navy admiral
