= Robert Easter =

Robert Easter may refer to:

- Robert Easter Jr. (born 1991), American boxer
- Robert A. Easter (born 1947), American animal scientist and president of the University of Illinois system
