= George D. Stoddard =

American educator (1897–1981)

10th President of the University of Illinois system
- In office 1946–1953
- Preceded by: Arthur Cutts Willard
- Succeeded by: Lloyd Morey

Personal details
- Born: George Dinsmore Stoddard; October 8, 1897 Carbondale, Pennsylvania, US
- Died: December 28, 1981 (aged 84)
- Spouse: Margaret Trautwein (m. 1925)
- Education: Pennsylvania State University; University of Iowa
- Profession: College administrator

George Dinsmore Stoddard (October 8, 1897 – December 28, 1981) was the president of University of Illinois and the University of the State of New York. He was also the chancellor of New York University and Long Island University.

== Early life ==
Stoddard was born in Carbondale, Pennsylvania, where he would be class salutatorian when he graduated from high school in 1915. He grew up Methodist but would become a Unitarian later in life.

After graduating high school he worked at a bank before enrolling at Pennsylvania State University where he was a member of Sigma Pi fraternity and studied industrial chemical engineering. He left college to serve in World War I as a second lieutenant of infantry in the U.S. Army. After the war he returned to Penn State and attempted several degree programs including mathematics and physics before finally receiving a degree in education in 1921. He then returned to Europe to study child psychology at the University of Paris where he studied under Th?odore Simon and received a diploma. He went on to receive his doctorate of child education at the University of Iowa in 1925.

== Career ==
=== University of Iowa ===
His teaching career began at the University of Iowa where he became a professor of psychology after graduation. He would go on to be the department chair and dean of the graduate school.

In 1929 he was appointed director of the Iowa Child Welfare Research Station. While director of the station he would debate with Dr. Lewis Terman of Stanford University on the nature of intelligence and the usefulness of intelligence testing. Stoddard defended the view that environment and intelligence influenced each other. Terman advocated that intelligence was unchanging and based almost entirely on heredity.

=== University of the State of New York ===
Stoddard was named president of the University of the State of New York and Commissioner of Education in September 1942. As commissioner he was vocally against letting 14 year olds drop out of school to work because they could potentially be exploited.

=== Japan ===
In 1946, he was assigned to General Douglas MacArthur to advise on establishing a new Japanese educational system. He was also asked by Emperor Hirohito to find a tutor for Prince Akihito. He was then assigned to the U.S. delegation for UNESCO at their first meeting in Paris.

=== University of Illinois ===
Later in 1946, Stoddard was named president of the University of Illinois. While at Illinois, he oversaw postwar expansion which included doubling the faculty and opening branch campuses in Chicago and Galesburg. His tenure was marred by left-wing student activism and disputes over academic philosophies in the economics department which led to clashes with the state's legislature.

He had a falling out with the Board of Trustees over university-supported research on Krebiozen, a drug claimed to be a cancer cure. When he ordered an end to funding for the research in 1953, he lost a “no confidence” vote with the trustees and resigned.

=== New York University ===
After leaving Illinois, Stoddard was hired by NYU to chair a self-study of the university's role in the urban community. The study led to the reorganization of the School of Education's curriculum and administration.

Stoddard became dean of the department of education in 1956. In 1960 he was named chancellor and executive vice president of the university. In 1962 he opened the first center for Hebrew studies at a public university. He retired in 1964 but remained a distinguished professor of education for three years.

=== Long Island University ===
In 1967 he came out of retirement to serve as vice chancellor of LIU. His main focus was starting the university's Brooklyn center. He was promoted to chancellor and eventually retired again in 1969.

=== Educational views ===
Stoddard's first love was always elementary education. He championed departmentalized elementary education and educational technology. He also advocated the social value of play where he said, On the playing fields of America, our youth each day can learn to accept and understand racial and religious differences.

=== Outside of Academia ===
Stoddard was active in many groups outside of education. He was a member of the board of the Lincoln Center for Performing Arts. He also completed a report for the Carnegie Corporation on operations and programming for the Brooklyn Institute of Arts and Sciences.

== Personal life and death ==
Stoddard married Margaret Trautwein on December 26, 1925. They had three sons, Phillip, Arthur, and Alfred, and two daughters, Caroline and Eleanor.

Stoddard died on December 28, 1981. He is interred on Hart Island in New York City.

== Works ==
- “Krebiozen,” The Great Cancer Mystery (Boston: Beacon Press, 1955)
- Paranoids Versus the People (Kalamazoo, 1953).
- The Pursuit of Education: An Autobiography (New York: Vantage Press, 1981).
- The Meaning of Intelligence (New York: Macmillan Company, 1943).
