= Louisa Gregory =

American academic

- Born: Louisa Catherine Allen; December 9, 1848; Scott County, Kentucky, U.S.
- Died: May 1, 1920 (aged 71); Washington, D.C., U.S.
- Education: Illinois State Normal University
- Occupation: educator
- Employer: Illinois Industrial University (1874–1880)
- Known for: domestic science
- Spouse: John Milton Gregory (m. 1879; died 1898)
- Children: 5

Louisa Catherine Gregory (née Allen; December 9, 1848 – May 1, 1920), was a pioneer in the field of domestic science. She was born in 1848 in Scott County, Kentucky, and graduated from Decatur High School. She continued her pursuit of education, attending Illinois State Normal University. In 1874 Louisa Allen became a faculty member at Illinois Industrial University, as a pioneer member of the School of Domestic Science and Art. In June 1880, she resigned as a professor at the University of Illinois after marrying Regent John Milton Gregory on June 18, 1879. He died in 1898.

== Early life and education ==
Louisa Catherine Allen was born in Scott County, Kentucky, to David Skillman Allen and Amanda Risk Allen on December 9, 1848. Louisa Allen spent her childhood in the Industrial Revolution, where inventions such as the sewing machine made their debut. She attended the local school in Mason County and committed herself to becoming a teacher in Illinois. She attended Illinois State Normal University in Bloomington, Illinois, and obtained her degree in three years, graduating in 1870.

Shortly after leaving Normal University, Louisa Allen accepted a position as principal of the high school in Alton, Illinois. One year later she moved to Peoria and taught at the County Normal School until she was hired at Illinois Industrial University.

== Career ==
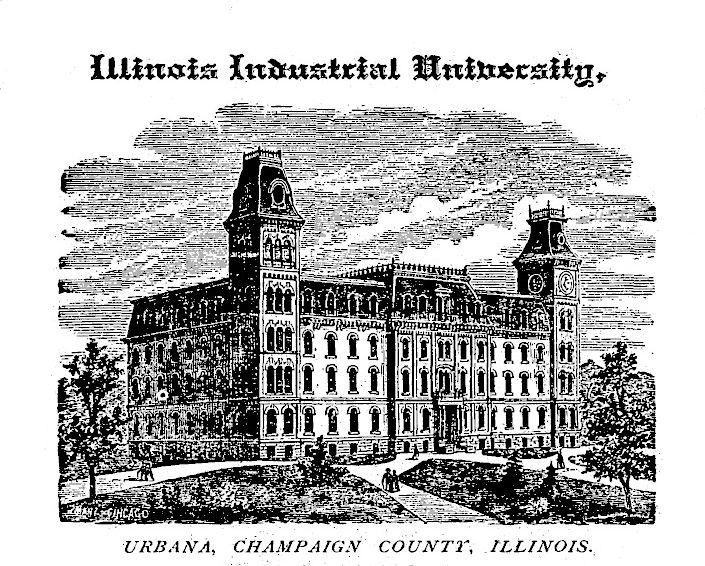
Illinois Industrial University

Louisa Allen became a professor at Illinois Industrial University, now known as the University of Illinois, in 1874 as a member of the School of Domestic Science and Art. While teaching, Louisa Allen educated young women, proclaiming that " the house-keeper needs education as much as the house-builder," such that women can be "equals of their educated husbands and associates, and enabling them to bring the aids of science and culture to all the important labors and vocations of womanhood." The curriculum for a degree in Domestic Science and Arts included everything from advanced botany, to medieval history, and Household Esthetics. While on staff at the university, Louisa Allen acted as the dean of women students, known as the Perceptress. She resigned in 1880.

== Published works ==
=== An American Housekeeper in Paris ===
Published on September 16, 1886, Louisa Allen Gregory submitted an article as a part of a publication called The Advance. This article focused primarily on the climate of American Housekeeping at that time. Gregory expresses her concerns about the "domestic issues in the United States" and how the French style of housekeeping may provide a solution.

== Death ==
Gregory died on May 1, 1920, in Washington, D.C.

== Legacy ==
Upon her death, scholarships were set up in Louisa Gregory's name at Kalamazoo College, University of Michigan and Illinois State University.
