= Timothy L. Killeen =

British and American geophysicist

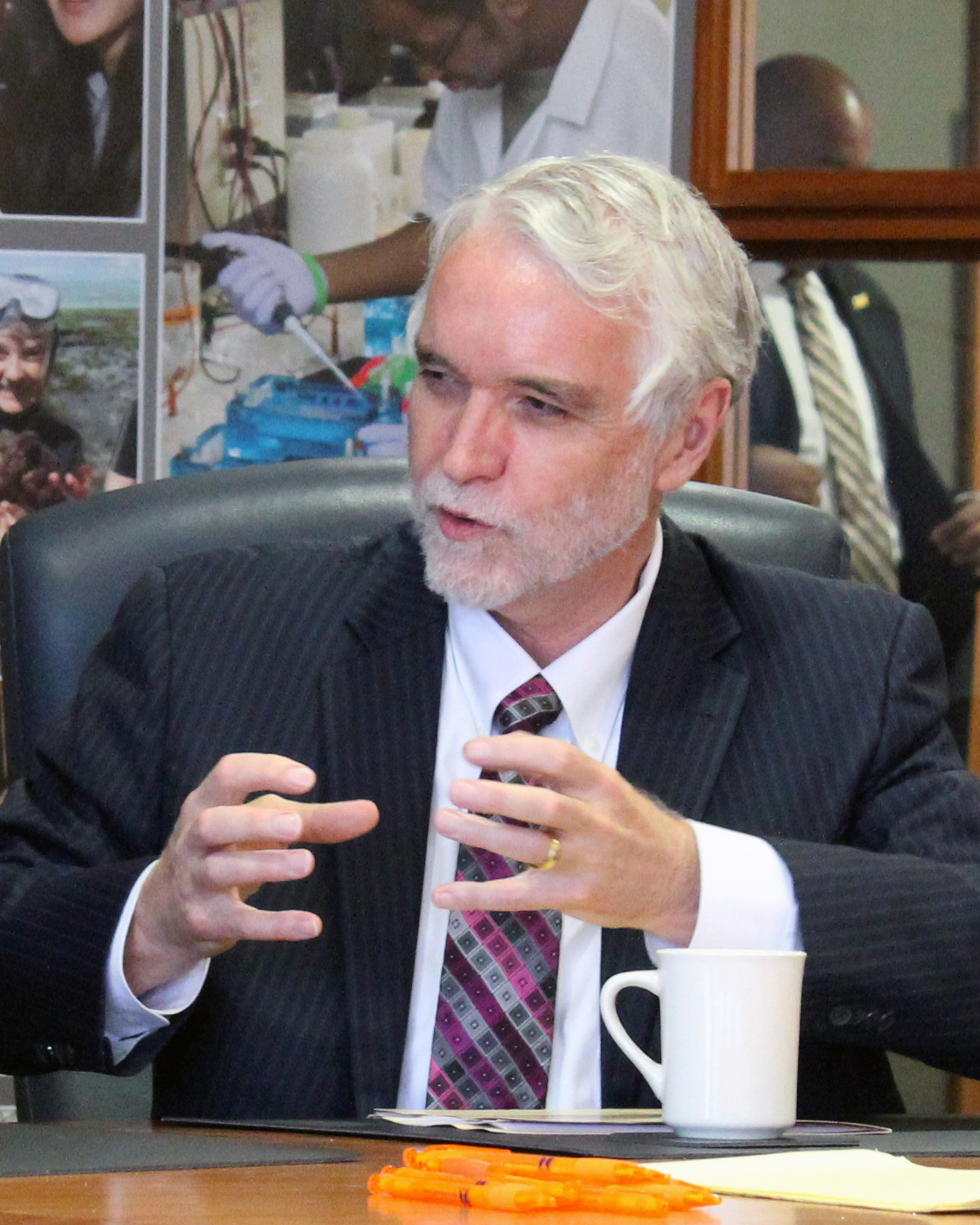
- Killeen in 2015

20th President of the University of Illinois System
- Incumbent
- Assumed office 18 May 2015
- Preceded by: Robert A. Easter

Personal details
- Born: Timothy Laurence Killeen; 1952 (age 73–74) Cardiff, Wales
- Spouse: Roberta Johnson
- Children: 5
- Education: University College London (BS, PhD)
- Scientific career
- Fields: Atmospheric and space sciences Atomic and molecular physics Geoscience
- Institutions: University of Michigan; University of Colorado, Boulder; National Science Foundation; State University of New York; University of Illinois System
- Thesis: Positron Collisions in Gaseous Media (1975)

Timothy Laurence Killeen (born 1952) is a British and American geophysicist, space physicist, professor, and university administrator. Killeen took office as the president of the University of Illinois system in 2015. He has been the principal investigator on research projects for NASA and the National Science Foundation. Killeen has authored more than 150 publications in peer-reviewed journals as well as more than 300 other publications and papers. He has served on various White House committees and task forces and is a past editor-in-chief of the Journal of Atmospheric and Solar-Terrestrial Physics.

== Early life and education ==
Killeen was born in Cardiff, Wales in early 1952 to Nora Christine (Curran) Killeen and John Francis Killeen. He received his Bachelor of Science in physics and astronomy in 1972 and PhD in atomic and molecular physics in 1975, both from University College London, earning his doctorate at the age of 23. After receiving his degree, Killeen worked as a research assistant at the university until 1978.

== Career ==
=== University of Michigan ===
Paul Hays, Director of the Space Physics Research Laboratory at the University of Michigan, attracted Killeen to join the SPRL team as a postdoctoral scholar in 1978. It was during this time at SPRL that he helped to develop an instrument of the TIMED spacecraft. Killeen worked at the University of Michigan, first as an associate research scientist, before being offered an associate professorship in the department of Atmospheric, Oceanic and Space Sciences in 1987. In 1990, Killeen was offered a full professorship in the department, which he maintained until leaving the University of Michigan in 2000.

During his time at the University of Michigan, in 1993 Killeen became the director of the SPRL, the unit that attracted him to join the university's faculty in the first place. He stayed on as director until 1998. In 1997, Killeen was named Associate Vice President for Research as well as Director of the Global Change Laboratory at the university, positions he maintained until his departure in 2000.

=== National Center for Atmospheric Research ===
Killeen spent four summers (1983, 1985, 1986, and 1987) as a visiting scientist at the National Center for Atmospheric Research at the University of Colorado Boulder. In 1988, Killeen joined the NCAR as an affiliate scientist, staying on until 1992, less than a year before he was named director of the SPRL. In 2000, Killeen left the University of Michigan to take on a full time position as a senior scientist at the NCAR shortly before being named its director. Killeen remained director until 2008.

=== NASA ===
In 1992, Killeen joined the team at NASA Goddard Space Flight Center as a visiting senior scholar where he contributed to the Polar satellite. Killeen was involved in many NASA projects, including the design, development and building of the TIMED Doppler Interferometer (TIDI) instrument for the TIMED spacecraft. He has also worked on the development of the Fabry-Perot Interferometer (FPI) for various spacecraft, including the Dynamics Explorer Spacecraft.

=== National Science Foundation ===
Killeen left as Director of the NCAR to accept the position of Assistant Director for the Geosciences at the National Science Foundation in 2008. Killeen had chaired NSF Committees, including the NSF Coupling, Energetics and Dynamics of Atmospheric Regions (CEDAR) Advisory Committee. He remained as assistant director until 2012.

=== Academia ===
In 2010, Killeen returned to the University of Colorado Boulder as Lyall Research Professor, leaving again in 2012 to take a position at the State University of New York.

Killeen was named Vice Chancellor for Research at the State University of New York in 2012 and President of the Research Foundation there. In his role, Killeen administered SUNY's $900 million research portfolio.

In 2015, Killeen left SUNY to become the 20th President of the University of Illinois system. On January 8, 2026, it was announced that Killeen would retire from the University of Illinois system in June 2027.

== Awards and honors ==
Killeen has been awarded a NASA Achievement Award three times. First in 1985 for his contribution to the Dynamics Explorer spacecraft, again in 1998 for his contribution to the Polar satellite, and a third time in 2006 for his contribution to the Thermosphere-Ionosphere (TIMED) spacecraft.

During his time as a professor at the University of Michigan, Killeen was awarded a 1993 Excellence in Research Award and an Excellence in Teaching Award in 2000, both from the university's College of Engineering.

In 2005, Killeen was named a Fellow of the American Meteorological Society and in 2007 he was elected to the National Academy of Engineering for contributions to interferometer design, and measurement and modeling of the properties and dynamics of the upper atmosphere and ionosphere. In 2015, he was named a Fellow of the American Association for the Advancement of Science. He is also a member of the New York Academy of Sciences.

Killeen was president of the American Geophysical Union from 2006 until 2008.

In 2010, Killeen was awarded an honorary Doctor of Sciences from his alma mater, University College London.

== See also ==
- List of University College London people
