= Heidi M. Hurd =

American lawyer

Heidi M. Hurd is an American lawyer, focusing in criminal law, torts, environmental law, environmental ethics, political theory, moral philosophy and general jurisprudence, currently the David C. Baum Professor of Law and Professor of Philosophy at University of Illinois College of Law and previously the Herzog Research Professor of Law at University of San Diego. She received a BA from Queen's University at Kingston, an MA in philosophy from Dalhousie University, a PhD in philosophy and a JD from the University of Southern California, and a MEM from Yale School of Forestry and Environmental Studies.

Hurd was Dean at Illinois Law during the University of Illinois clout scandal. According to her admission, "about 15 students" connected to the scandal were admitted to the Law School during her tenure as Dean. She attempted to deny or discount her role in the scandal, but her allegations were dismissed by Judge Abner Mikva, who served as Chair of the Commission that investigated the scandal.
