= Annetta Ayers Saunders =

American physician

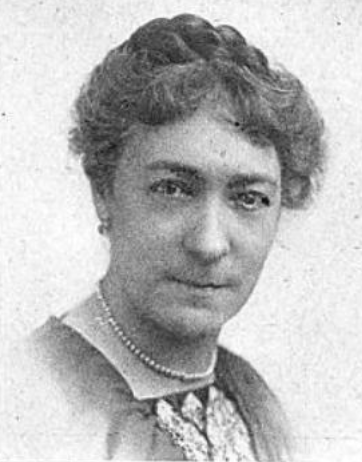
- Annetta Ayers Saunders, from a 1922 publication
- Born: Annetta Ayers; December 16, 1861; Urbana, Illinois, U.S.
- Died: June 20, 1938 (age 76); Chicago, Illinois, U.S.
- Occupations: Physician, clubwoman

Annetta Ayers Saunders (December 16, 1861 – June 20, 1938) was an American physician and clubwoman, based in Chicago. Her significant estate was donated to her alma mater, the University of Illinois, after her death.

== Early life and education ==
Ayers was born in Urbana, Illinois, the elder daughter of Homer W. Ayers and Lorinda Jane McConoughey Ayers. Her father was a lawyer who practiced with Abraham Lincoln, and a Union Army veteran of the American Civil War. She graduated from the University of Illinois in 1884. She trained for a medical career at National Medical College, Harvey Medical College, Dunham Medical College, and Hering Medical College.

== Career ==
Saunders assisted University of Illinois botany professor Thomas Jonathan Burrill after college, and with him she developed a process for making colored slides of plant tissue samples.

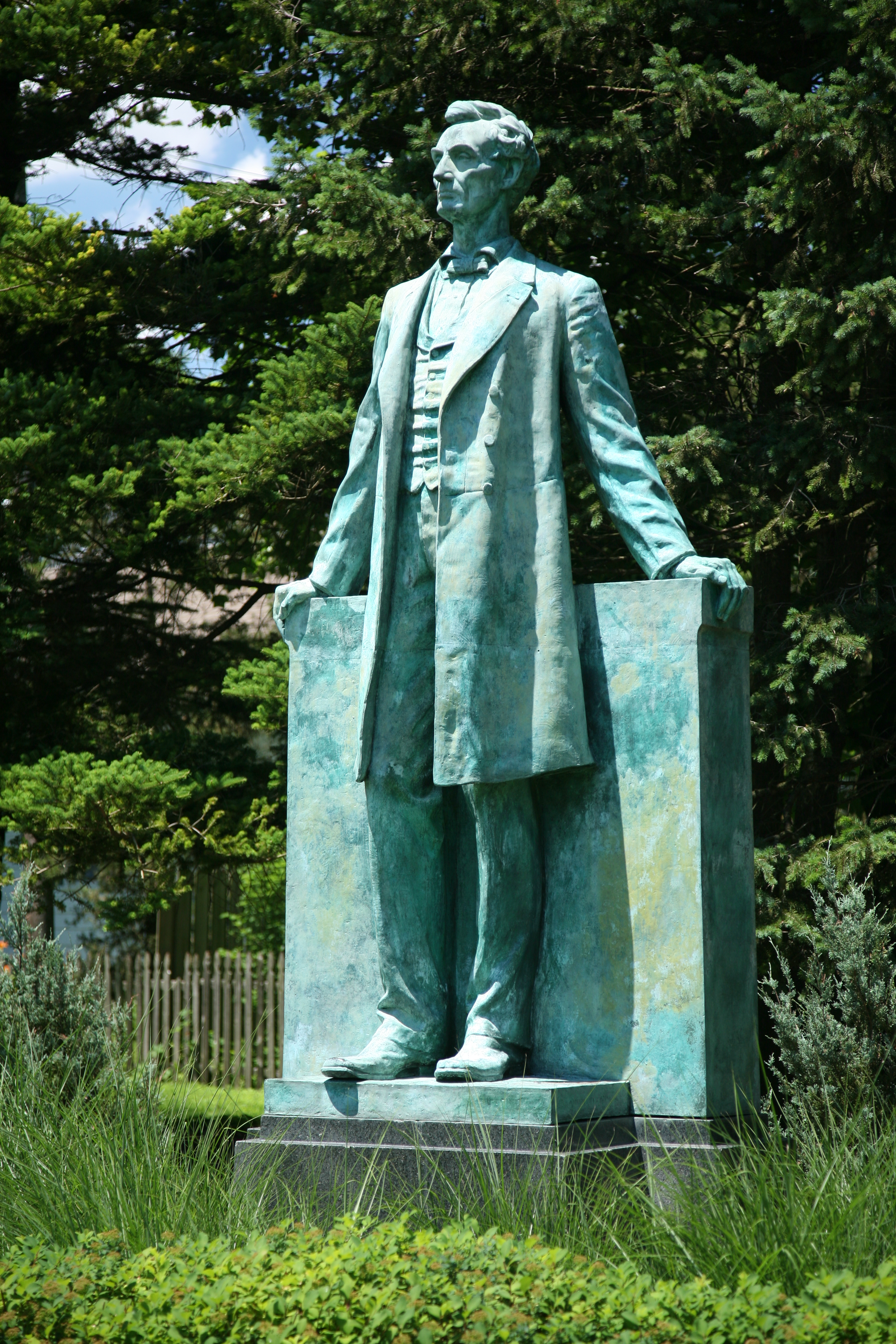
Lincoln statue in Urbana, by Lorado Taft; Saunders unveiled this statue when it was first installed, in 1927.

She was assistant resident physician at National Emergency Hospital from 1896 to 1897. She taught bacteriology at medical colleges, and at the University of Illinois. She recommended that women see female physicians, and that churches be better ventilated. During World War I, she provided free medical care to the families of servicemen from the Chicago area. In 1927, she unveiled a bronze statue of Lincoln in Urbana, donated by her uncle, judge J. O. Cunningham.

Saunders was a member of the Illinois Homeopathic Medical Society and the Chicago Medical Society, and president of the University of Illinois Alumni Association of Chicago. She was also president of the Social Economics Club, a women's club in Chicago. She made gifts to the University of Illinois' library and museum of natural history. She was a member of the Daughters of the American Revolution.

== Publications ==
- "Lincoln's Life in My Home Town"

== Personal life and legacy ==
Ayers married physician Charles Boulson Saunders in 1896. He died in 1926. She died in 1938, at the age of 76, in Chicago. In 1943, after the death of her only nephew, Saunders' estate, valued at more than $164,000, was left to the University of Illinois. Her medical library and two paintings were also left to the university.
