= Thomas Jonathan Burrill =

American botanist and plant pathologist (1839–1916)

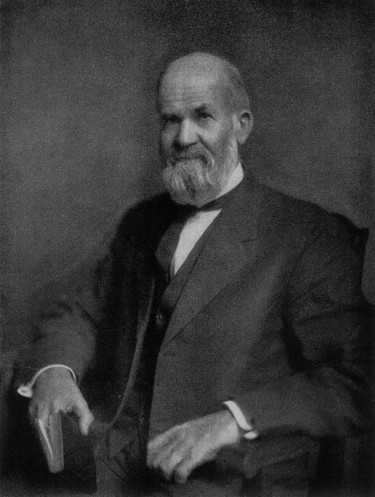

3rd President of the University of Illinois system
- Acting
- In office 1891–1894
- Preceded by: Selim Peabody
- Succeeded by: Andrew S. Draper

Personal details
- Born: April 25, 1839 Pittsfield, Massachusetts, US
- Died: April 14, 1916 (aged 76)
- Education: Illinois State Normal University
- Profession: College administrator; botanist; plant pathologist

Thomas Jonathan Burrill (April 25, 1839 – April 14, 1916) was an American botanist, plant pathologist, and college administrator who first discovered bacterial causes for plant disease. He introduced Erwinia amylovora (called by him Micrococcus amylovorus) as the causal agent of pear fire blight.

Born in Pittsfield, Massachusetts, he moved with his family at age 9 to a farm in Stephenson County, Illinois. Burrill graduated Illinois State Normal University in 1865, and then worked for two years as superintendent of the Urbana public schools. He received his PhD from the University of Chicago in 1881.

Burrill was selected by John Wesley Powell to be the botanist for an expedition to the Colorado Rocky Mountains in 1867. Eight of 12 members of the expedition party made an ascent of Pikes Peak but it is not known if Burrill was among them. Most of Burrill's botanical collections were lost when a burro loaded with bundles of dried plants was drowned while fording a swollen mountain stream.

After the Colorado expedition, Burrill began teaching algebra as an assistant professor in 1869. He soon switched to teaching botany and by 1870 was promoted to professor. In 1868, he was elected professor of botany and horticulture at University of Illinois and remained there the rest of his career, eventually serving as Vice President in 1882. Burrill served as acting regent of the University of Illinois from 1891 until 1894. Annetta Ayers Saunders was his laboratory assistant in the 1880s.

== Bibliography ==
- Ewan, Joseph; Ewan, Nesta Dunn (1981). Biographical dictionary of Rocky Mountain naturalists: a guide to the writings and collections of botanists, zoologists, geologists, artists and photographers, 1682–1932. Utrecht/Antwerpen: Bohn, Scheltema & Holkema. ISBN 90-313-0415-8.
- Watson, Elmo Scott (1950). "John W. Powell's Colorado Expedition of 1867" (PDF). The Colorado Magazine. 27 (4): 303–311.
