= Orville Hodge =

American politician

20th Auditor of Public Accounts of Illinois
- In office 1953 – 1956
- Governor: William Stratton
- Preceded by: Benjamin O. Cooper
- Succeeded by: Lloyd Morey

Personal details
- Born: Orville Enoch Hodge; October 1, 1904 Anderson, Indiana, U.S.
- Died: December 29, 1986 (aged 82) Edwardsville, Illinois, U.S.
- Party: Republican
- Criminal charges: 54 counts of bank fraud, fraud, embezzlement, conspiracy to defraud and forgery
- Conviction penalty: 12–15 years imprisonment
- Conviction status: Released 1970, Died 1986

Orville Enoch Hodge (October 1, 1904 – December 29, 1986) was the Auditor of Public Accounts (predecessor to the Office of Comptroller) of the state of Illinois from 1952 to 1956. During his term in office, he embezzled $6.15 million of state funds, mainly by altering and forging checks that were paid on the state's account.

== Biography ==
Hodge was born in Anderson, Indiana, and from the age of four was raised in Granite City, Illinois. He and his family owned land and businesses in that area. In 1946, he married Margaret Coudy of Granite City with whom he had one son.

He was elected to the Illinois House of Representatives, where he served three terms. He was elected state auditor in 1952. He was a Republican.

== Embezzlement ==
His scheme started shortly after his election, when he forged accounting records and created a false paper trail to convince the Illinois General Assembly that his office was insolvent. The legislature gave his office a $525,000 emergency appropriation, which Hodge kept for himself.

With the funds that he stole from the state, Hodge purchased two private jets, 30 automobiles (including a Lincoln, four Cadillacs and a Rolls-Royce imported from Britain), and multiple properties in Florida and Illinois.

The embezzlement scheme was exposed by the Chicago Daily News, whose reporting team (including George Thiem) was awarded a 1957 Pulitzer Prize for their investigation.

Upon indictment, Hodge, who was facing the prospect of spending the rest of his life in prison, agreed to forfeit all of his assets and pleaded guilty to 54 federal and state charges of bank fraud, fraud, embezzlement, conspiracy to defraud and forgery. He was sentenced to 12 to 15 years in prison.

He was released in 1970 and went to work at his sister's hardware store, then as a car salesman and finally as a real estate agent in Granite City until his death at the age of 82 in Edwardsville, Illinois.

== Aftermath ==
The Hodge scandal played a role in the decision by Illinois lawmakers to abolish the office of the State Auditor in the new state constitution of 1970. The office was replaced by the new office of the Comptroller.

Party political offices
Preceded by Sinon A. Murray	Republican nominee for Illinois Auditor of Public Accounts; 1952	Succeeded by Elbert S. Smith
Political offices
Preceded by Benjamin O. Cooper	Illinois Auditor of Public Accounts; 1953 – 1956	Succeeded by Lloyd Morey
