= Stanley O. Ikenberry =

American academic (1935–2025)

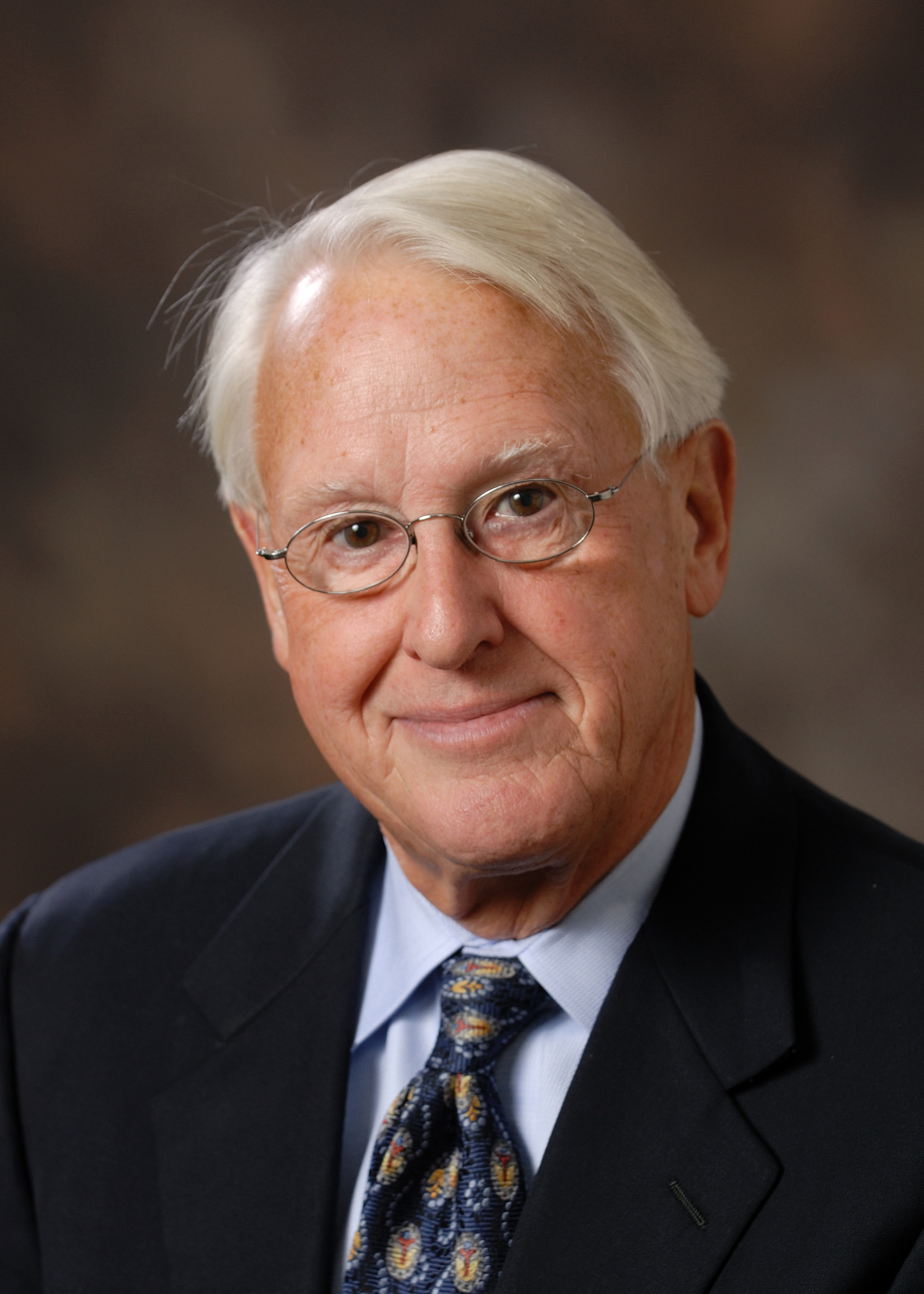
- Ikenberry in 2010

14th and 17th President of the University of Illinois System
- Acting
- In office 2010–2010
- Preceded by: B. Joseph White
- Succeeded by: Michael Hogan
- In office 1979–1995
- Preceded by: John E. Corbally
- Succeeded by: James J. Stukel

President of the American Council on Education
- In office 1996–2001
- Preceded by: Robert H. Atwell
- Succeeded by: David Ward

Personal details
- Born: March 3, 1935 Lamar, Colorado, U.S.
- Died: April 1, 2025 (aged 90) Boca Grande, Florida, U.S.
- Education: Shepard College; Michigan State University (MA, PhD)
- Profession: College administrator

Stanley O. Ikenberry (March 3, 1935 – April 1, 2025) was an American academic who served as the 14th president of the University of Illinois System from 1979 to 1995 and again as the 17th president on an interim basis in 2010. Ikenberry was responsible for a major consolidation of university campuses and new student initiatives.

As an undergraduate, Ikenberry attended Shepard College, where his father served as the president. He received his MA (1957) and PhD (1960) degrees from Michigan State University. Ikenberry started his career at Michigan State before serving as dean of the College of Human Resources and Education at West Virginia University and senior vice-president at Pennsylvania State University.

In 1979, at age 44, Ikenberry became the youngest president of the University of Illinois. He remained in this role for 16 years and is the longest serving president in the university's history. In this role, Ikenberry led the consolidation of the university's Medical Center and Chicago Circle campuses to form the current University of Illinois Chicago, now the largest and most comprehensive research university campus in metropolitan Chicago.

In Urbana-Champaign, Ikenberry led several major academic initiatives, including the creation of the Beckman Institute for Advanced Science and Technology and the National Center for Supercomputing Applications. Ikenberry led the university's first major capital campaign and launched a second campaign in the late 1980s to raise in excess of a billion dollars. The quality and diversity of the Illinois student body increased significantly during his tenure with his creation of the President's Scholars Program.

Ikenberry retired from the university presidency in 1995, but returned in 2010 to serve as Interim President.

Ikenberry also served as the 10th president of the American Council on Education. At the time of his death, Ikenberry was serving as President Emeritus for the university, Regent Professor in the College of Education and Principal Investigator of the National Institute for Learning Outcomes Assessment (NILOA). In 2008, Ikenberry partnered with George Kuh to create the National Institute for Learning Outcomes Assessment (NILOA). This Institute was established to monitor and assist institutions as they develop evidence for student learning.

In 2008, the University of Illinois opened the Stanley O. Ikenberry Commons and the Ikenberry Dining. Ikenberry died in Boca Grande, Florida on April 1, 2025, at the age of 90.
