= Lloyd Morey =

American politician

11th President of the University of Illinois system
- In office 1953–1955
- Preceded by: George D. Stoddard
- Succeeded by: David D. Henry

Personal details
- Born: January 15, 1886; Laddonia, Missouri, US
- Died: September 29, 1965 (aged 79); Champaign, Illinois, US
- Education: University of Illinois Urbana-Champaign
- Profession: College administrator

Lloyd Morey (January 15, 1886 – September 29, 1965) was an American educator and interim Illinois Auditor of Public Accounts (1956–1957).

Born in Laddonia, Missouri, Morey went to the Gem City Business College in Quincy, Illinois. He then received his bachelor's degrees in English and music from University of Illinois Urbana-Champaign. He worked at the University of Illinois as a bookkeeper, comptroller and eventually became president of the University of Illinois system in 1954 retiring in 1955. In July 1956, the Governor of Illinois named Morey Illinois Auditor of Public Accounts and he served until January 1956. Morey died in Champaign, Illinois of a heart attack on September 29, 1965.

== Notes ==
Political offices
Preceded by Orville E. Hodge	Illinois Auditor of Public Accounts; 1956–1957	Succeeded by Elbert S. Smith
