= John Milton Gregory =

American academic administrator (1822–1898)

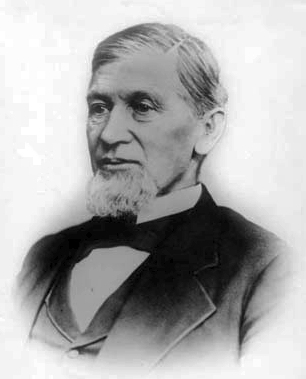

1st President of the University of Illinois system
- In office 1867–1880
- Preceded by: Office established
- Succeeded by: Selim Peabody

2nd President of Kalamazoo College
- In office 1864–1867
- Preceded by: James Andrus Blinn Stone
- Succeeded by: Kendall Brooks

Michigan Superintendent of Public Instruction
- In office 1859–1864
- Preceded by: Ira Mayhew
- Succeeded by: Oramel Hosford

Personal details
- Born: July 16, 1822 Sand Lake, New York, U.S.
- Died: October 19, 1898 (aged 76) Washington, D.C., U.S.
- Spouse: Louisa Catherine Allen (m. 1879)
- Children: 5
- Education: Union College
- Profession: College administrator

John Milton Gregory (July 6, 1822 – October 19, 1898) was an American educator and the first president (regent was his official title) of the University of Illinois, then known as Illinois Industrial University.

== Early life ==
John Milton Gregory was born on July 6, 1822, in Sand Lake, New York. He graduated from Union College in 1846. He then spent two years studying law, but ultimately entered the ministry and became a Baptist clergyman.

== Career ==
In 1852, Gregory was appointed principal of a school in Detroit. Gregory was elected Michigan superintendent of public instruction in 1858, after several years spent as editor of the Michigan Journal of Education. After leaving office in 1864 he became the second president of Kalamazoo College from 1864 until 1867.

Gregory served as the regent of Illinois Industrial University, now the University of Illinois at Urbana-Champaign, from the university's founding in 1867 until his resignation in 1880. While Gregory credited Jonathan Baldwin Turner as the central figure in the university's establishment, Gregory, during his tenure as University of Illinois's first president, helped determine the direction of the university by advocating the presence of a classically based liberal arts curriculum in addition to the industrial and agricultural curriculum desired by the Illinois Industrial League and many state residents and lawmakers of the time.

One of Gregory's most important contributions to the development of the University of Illinois was his commitment to the education of women. In 1870 Gregory cast the deciding vote to admit women to the university, making Illinois the first university after the Civil War to admit women. In his 1872 University Report he wrote, "No industry is more important to human happiness and well being than that which makes the home. And this industry involves principles of science as many and as profound as those which control any other human employment"

To keep this commitment to the education of women he hired Louisa C. Allen in 1874 to develop a program in domestic science. Although the experiment in domestic science would only last six years (1874–1880), it was the first domestic science degree program in higher education.

From 1882 to 1885, Gregory served as a member of the U.S. Civil Service Commission.

== The Seven Laws of Teaching ==
In 1886 Gregory authored his most well-known work The Seven Laws of Teaching, which asserted that a teacher should:

- Know thoroughly and familiarly the lesson you wish to teach; or, in other words, teach from a full mind and a clear understanding.
- Gain and keep the attention and interest of the pupils upon the lesson. Refuse to teach without attention.
- Use words understood by both teacher and pupil in the same sense—language clear and vivid alike to both.
- Begin with what is already well known to the pupil in the lesson or upon the subject, and proceed to the unknown by single, easy, and natural steps, letting the known explain the unknown.
- Use the pupil's own mind, exciting his self-activities. Keep his thoughts as much as possible ahead of your expression, making him a discoverer of truth.
- Require the pupil to reproduce in thought the lesson he is learning—thinking it out in its parts, proofs, connections, and applications til he can express it in his own language.
- Review, review, REVIEW, reproducing correctly the old, deepening its impression with new thought, correcting false views, and completing the true.

== Personal life ==
Gregory married twice. He had five children: three daughters and two sons. His first wife died in a sanitarium in Michigan after an illness.

Gregory married Louisa Catherine Allen, the woman he hired to be the chair of domestic science at the University of Illinois, on June 18, 1879.

== Death and legacy ==
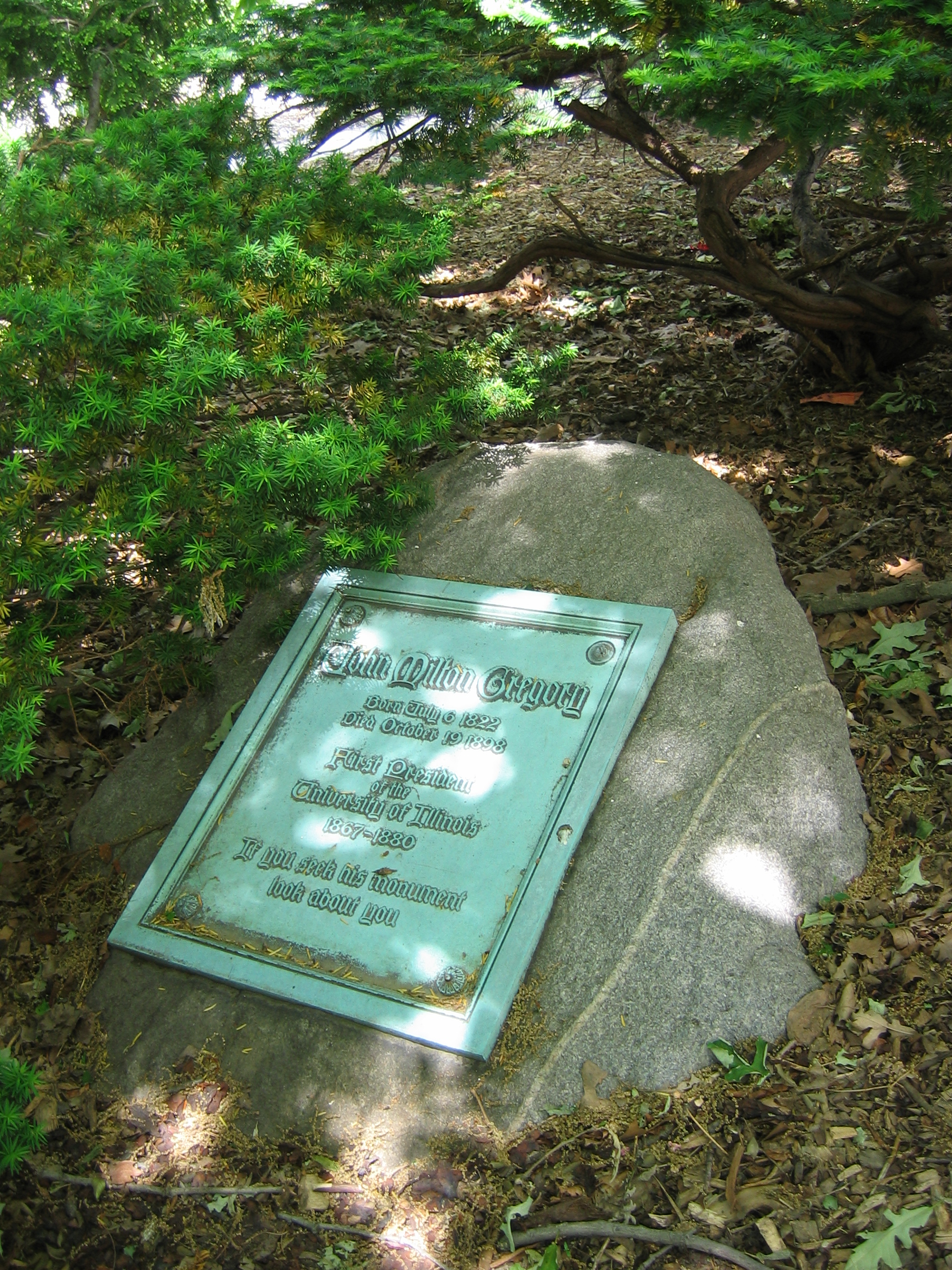
The grave of John Milton Gregory on the UIUC campus

Gregory died on October 19, 1898, in Washington, D.C.

Gregory is buried just to the south of Altgeld Hall near the Main Quadrangle on the UIUC campus.

John Milton Gregory Math and Science Academy of the Chicago Public Schools was originally established in 1923 as John Milton Gregory Elementary School and is located in the historic North Lawndale, Chicago community.

== Other publications ==
- School Funds and School Laws of Michigan: With Notes and Forms to which are Added Elements of School Architecture etc. with Lists of Text Books and School Books (1859)
- Relations of the Normal School to the school Systems of the States: An Address, Delivered at the Re-Dedication of the State Normal School Building, at Ypsilanti, April 18, 1860 (1860)
- The Right and Duty of Christianity to Educate: Inaugural address of John M. Gregory ... Delivered at the Jubilee Meeting at Kalamazoo, Tuesday evening, September 20, 1864 (1865)
- The Hand-book of History and Chronology: Embracing Modern History, Both European and America for the 16th, 17th, 18th, and 19th Centuries for Students of History and Adapted to Accompany the Map of Time (1867)
- Normal class manual for Bible Teachers (1873)
- Syllabus of Lectures on the History of Civilization. To Senior Classes of the Illinois Industrial University. Winter term, 1877 (1877)
- A New Political Economy (1882)
- The Seven Laws of Teaching (1886)

=== French ===
- L'Illinois: sa position géographique, son etendue, son histoire, ses écoles, ses ressources, son Agriculture, with O. R. Keith (1878)

=== Spanish ===
- Las Siete Leyes de la Enseñanza (1919)
