= James J. Stukel =

American academic administrator

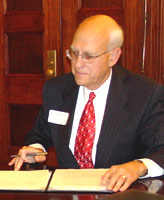
- Stukel in 2004

15th President of the University of Illinois system
- In office August 1 1995 – January 31, 2005
- Preceded by: Stanley O. Ikenberry
- Succeeded by: B. Joseph White

Personal details
- Born: March 30, 1937 (age 88); Joliet, Illinois, U.S.
- Education: Purdue University; University of Illinois
- Profession: College administrator; engineer

James J. Stukel (born March 30, 1937) is an American former educator who served as the 15th president of the University of Illinois system.

== Early life ==
James Stukel was born on March 30, 1937, in Joliet, Illinois, to Philip and Julia Stukel. James and his sole sibling, a sister 13 years older than he was, had a modest upbringing. His father, a pulp mill worker, and his mother, a homemaker, maintained a small, clapboard house. While neither of his parents had more than an eighth grade education, Stukel would say of them, "my father had a real gift for numbers. He could do things in his head that were remarkable, and my mother was extremely sharp until the day she died...they were...bright." His parents began to save for his college education soon after his birth.

Stukel's parents instilled in him a strong work ethic. He would later say, "they were pretty stern regarding my grades and homework...and I always worked." In third grade, he joined the school band. He would practice three to five hours each day on his saxophone. Of his band experience, he said, "nothing was given; it was earned." He would credit his band experiences to force him to set goals. According to Stukel, his "whole life...is based around competition and goal setting."

In junior high, Stukel started a paper route to earn income. In high school, he entered into student politics and was elected junior class president. His opponent would later remark that he was a "class act" and an "outstanding student and quiet leader."

== College ==
A high school chemistry teacher, recognizing Stukel's potential in engineering, drove him to visit Purdue University. He would later joke, "the University of Illinois wasn't in his vocabulary, but he took over the decision-making process." Stukel enrolled at Purdue and joined the Phi Gamma Delta fraternity. To help pay for school, he played saxophone with his dance band, The Spotlighters. The band played music from Woody Herman, Stan Getz, and other jazz artists. During the summer, Stukel would play at resorts.

It was at Purdue that Stukel met his wife Joan Helpling, a majorette with the Purdue marching band. The two toured Europe as members of a variety band. They would marry during their senior years. Stukel would later comment on his wife, "I [have] been...lucky in that I have a very supportive wife who...influenced the way I developed...in...positive ways." Stukel graduated with a Bachelor of Science degree in engineering from Purdue shortly after his marriage. The couple then moved to Virginia.

Stukel earned his M.S. and Ph.D. from the University of Illinois at Urbana-Champaign.

== Career ==
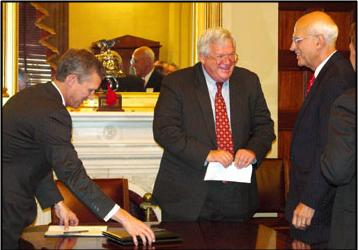
Technology Administration Under Secretary Bond (left), Speaker of the House Dennis Hastert (center), and James J. Stukel (right) on September 29, 2004.

After the completion of his Ph.D., Stukel joined the faculty of the Engineering College. He rose to the level of Associate Dean before transferring to the University of Illinois at Chicago. While there, he served in a variety of administrative capacities, assuming the roles of the Vice-Chancellor for Research, the Vice-Chancellor for Academic Affairs, and finally, Chancellor of the campus.

After his four-year tenure as chancellor, Stukel was selected as president of the University of Illinois system by the UI Board of Trustees succeeding Stanley O. Ikenberry. He served in this capacity for approximately 10 years (1995–2005) and was succeeded by B. Joseph White.

A residence hall at the University of Illinois at Chicago, the James Stukel Towers, was named after the former president.
