= Bernard White Jr. =

Indiana Politician

Bernard L. White Jr. (May 22, 1938 - February 10, 1986) was a state legislator in Indiana. A Democrat, he represented St. Joseph County, Indiana in the Indiana House of Representatives in 1968 and 1970. He lived in South Bend, Indiana.

He graduated from Ball State University in Muncie, Indiana and became a teacher.

Clara White was his mother. He had a son and five daughters. He died at age 47.

== See also ==
- List of first African-American U.S. state legislators
