= B. Joseph White =

American academic administrator (born 1947)

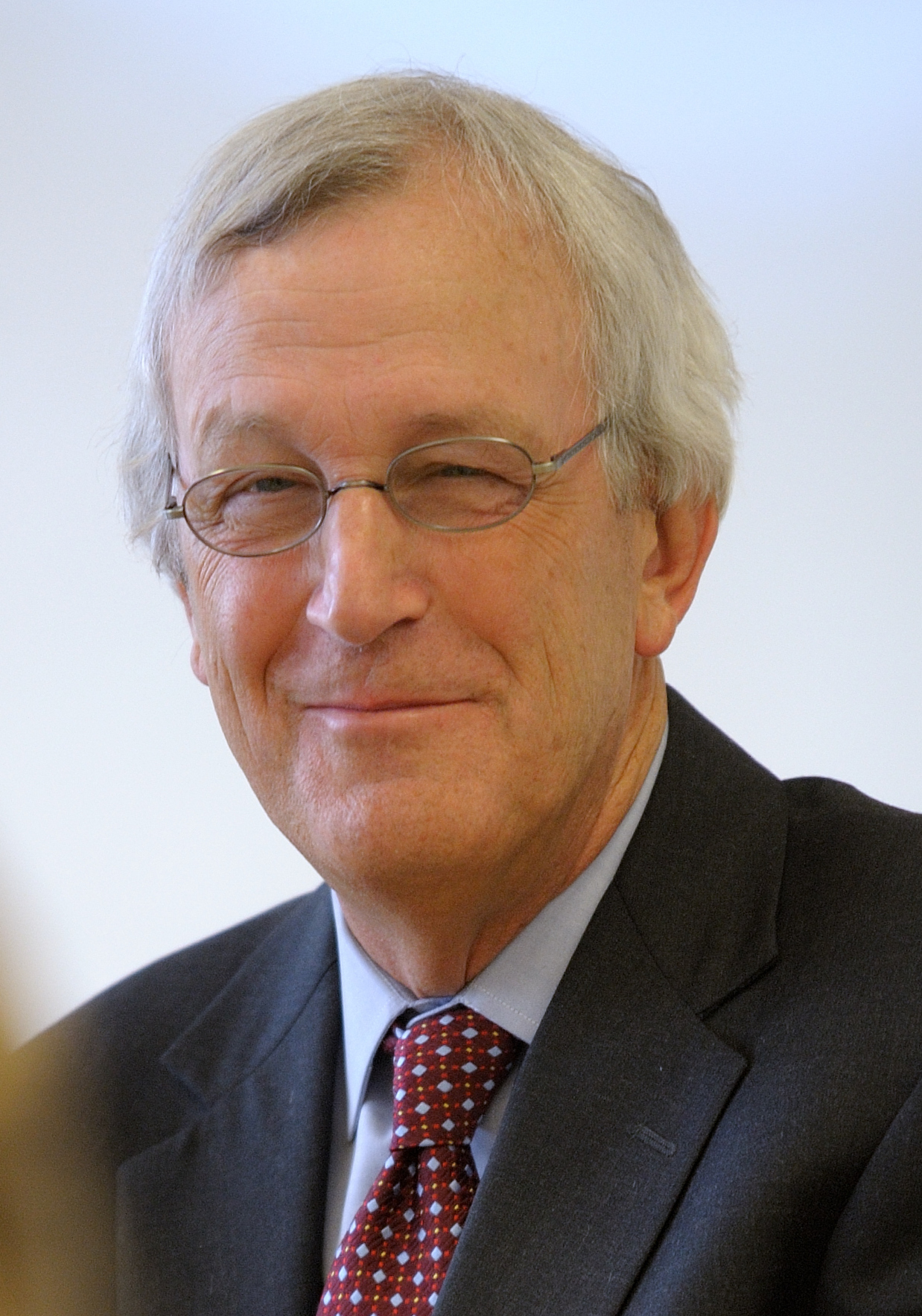
- B. Joseph White

16th President of the University of Illinois system
- In office January 31, 2005 – December 31, 2009
- Preceded by: James J. Stukel
- Succeeded by: Stanley O. Ikenberry

Interim President of the University of Michigan
- In office June 1, 2002 – July 31, 2002
- Preceded by: Lee C. Bollinger
- Succeeded by: Mary Sue Coleman

Personal details
- Born: April 6, 1947 (age 79) Detroit, Michigan, U.S.
- Spouse: Mary White
- Education: Georgetown University (BS); Harvard University (MBA); University of Michigan (PhD)
- Profession: Academic; businessperson
- Scientific career
- Fields: Business administration
- Thesis: Union response to job dissatisfaction and work innovations (1982)
- Doctoral advisors: Dallas Jones

Bernard Joseph White (born April 6, 1947) is president emeritus of the University of Illinois and professor emeritus of business at the University of Illinois at Urbana–Champaign. He is dean emeritus of the Stephen M. Ross School of Business and professor emeritus of business administration at the University of Michigan, where he also served as interim president, and Wilbur K. Pierpont Collegiate Professor of Leadership in Management Education. He is the author of The Nature of Leadership and Boards That Excel: Candid Insights and Practical Advice for Directors. Boards That Excel was named Governance Book of the Year for 2014 by Directors and Boards.

== Education ==
White graduated magna cum laude from the Georgetown University School of Foreign Service in 1969. He received an MBA with distinction from Harvard Business School, and a Doctor of Philosophy in business administration from the University of Michigan in 1975.

== Career ==
White began his faculty career at Michigan in 1975. He served from 1981 to 1987 as an officer of Cummins in Columbus, Indiana, first as vice president for management development and then as vice president for personnel and public affairs. He returned to the University of Michigan in 1987 and was appointed dean of the business school in 1991. He was appointed Wilbur K. Pierpont Collegiate Professor of Leadership in Management Education and served as a dean for a decade. In 2002, he was appointed interim president of the University of Michigan. In 2003, he worked at Fred Alger Management Co., an asset management firm in New York City. He returned to Michigan where he was a faculty member in the Life Sciences Institute. In 2005, he was named president of the University of Illinois and was appointed president emeritus in 2010. He was a faculty member of the College of Business where he was the James F. Towey Professor of Business and Leadership. He was appointed professor emeritus of business in 2020. He serves on the boards of directors of Gordon Food Service, M Financial and the Upjohn Institute for Employment Research.

White has written, taught and spoken extensively on leadership, management and governance. He is the author of The Nature of Leadership and Boards That Excel: Candid Insights and Practical Advice for Directors. He was honored with the Martin Luther King Jr. Leadership Award from the Illinois Commission on Diversity and Human Relations in 2007, the Leadership Award from the Illinois Legislative Latino Caucus Foundation in 2005 and a Doctor of Humane Letters degree (honorary) from Wabash College in 2003. White is a member of Phi Beta Kappa and Beta Gamma Sigma.

=== University of Michigan ===
White served from 1990 to 2001 as dean of the University of Michigan's Ross School of Business. During his deanship, the School's MBA, BBA, and executive education programs were highly ranked. The School's endowment rose from $30 million to more than $250 million. Endowed Chairs increased from nine to thirty-nine.

White led a major MBA curriculum overhaul, which aimed to intensify the development of students' professional and practical skills. The reforms re-defined the school's image and fueled a rise in its reputation, including being named one of the two "most innovative" business school's in the nation, according to Business Week magazine's surveys of corporate executives. Michigan became known for both innovation and action learning. The core innovation, called MAP (Multidisciplinary Action Project), puts students into "live cases" inside companies for seven weeks. White likened it to a medical school residency. Michigan was the first to integrate action learning, which is today common in business schools, into the core MBA curriculum as a requirement for all students. In addition, White's curriculum reform included cutting the 14-week semesters in half and adding executive education-style skills development seminars. Other initiatives, such as research on how to supplement the GMAT with a test of "practical intelligence," helped cement the school's reputation for concerning itself as much with the real-world performance of its graduates as their intellectual development.

Among the other highlights of White's curriculum reform was the introduction of an intensive two-day community service and corporate citizenship boot camp as the kickoff of the MBA program—a first among business schools.

Under White, Michigan's African-American enrollment was the highest among the top-ranked business schools. Enrollment of under-represented minorities hovered around 14-15 percent. The School was found to be "the best business school for blacks" by The Journal of Blacks in Higher Education. He also moved to aggressively globalize the School. Most notably, he founded the William Davidson Institute to position Michigan as a leader on economies transitioning from communism to free markets.

White was an early mover on distance learning, initially creating partnerships with major companies to deliver management training to their employees. In January 2000, White's team announced a partnership with FT Knowledge to provide open-enrollment e-learning classes.(FT Knowledge, at the time, was a division of Pearson plc, owner of the Financial Times and other major media properties.)

White built on a reputation in entrepreneurship grounded in the Michigan's long-running Growth Capital Symposium, which had started in 1981. White's team created additional opportunities for students to get venture capital and entrepreneurship experience by launching a student-run venture capital fund, called the Wolverine Venture Fund. Founded in 1997, its first investments were reported in The New York Times in 1999 and by 2004 at least one of those investments had turned into an IPO. In 1999, real estate mogul and University of Michigan Law School graduate Sam Zell joined with Ann Lurie, the widow of Zell's business partner, to provide $10 million to found the Samuel Zell & Robert H. Lurie Institute for Entrepreneurial Studies, and quickly began offering a wide array of courses, heavily oriented toward action learning.

In his second term as dean, White proclaimed that increasing female enrollment in business schools would be a top priority of his administration. This led to a major School initiative, a study of the reasons for low female enrollment at a dozen top business schools, and, ultimately a series of changes at the School. This work also ultimately led to the founding of a major new national advocacy organization, the Forte Foundation.

Under White, several of the School's other major new programs were created. In addition to the William Davidson Institute and the Zell-Lurie Institute for Entrepreneurial Studies, White also raised funds for and oversaw the creation of The Erb Institute for Sustainable Global Enterprise and The Joel D. Tauber Institute for Global Operations. His administration launched Michigan's first Executive MBA program and built Sam Wyly Hall, a new home for the school's highly ranked executive education programs.

White served as interim president of the University of Michigan in 2002. In January 2005 the board of regents recognized him as dean emeritus of the Stephen M. Ross School of Business and professor emeritus of business administration.

=== University of Illinois ===
White was named the sixteenth president of the University of Illinois in 2004, succeeding retiring president James J. Stukel. As president, White oversaw the three campuses in the University of Illinois system—Urbana-Champaign, Chicago, and Springfield. (In the University of Illinois system, each campus is headed by a chancellor. Each chancellor reports to the president.)

White took office on January 31, 2005. He was inaugurated on September 22, 2005. In fiscal year 2010, the University of Illinois budget was $4.6 billion. In his inaugural address, White proposed a new "compact" among five parties - the state, tuition payers and their families, donors, faculty members with research grants and contracts, and university leaders – all doing their parts to provide the resources needed to ensure what he termed "excellence and access." In his first year, White initiated a strategic planning process for the university, its three campuses and their colleges and departments. On June 1, 2007, White announced the $2.25 billion Brilliant Futures fundraising campaign. By August 31, 2009, the campaign had achieved 76% of its goal with 72% of the campaign period elapsed.

White championed the establishment of the University of Illinois Global Campus Partnership, an initiative to make University of Illinois programs and degrees available online to qualified students. Following an extensive shared governance process with faculty on the three campuses, Global Campus launched in January 2008 with a bachelor's degree-completion program for registered nurses and a master's degree and two graduate certificate programs in education with concentrations in e-learning, and 15 more degree and certificate programs in development. In January 2008, the Chicago Tribune reported that fewer than 15 people signed up for the program, which had already cost more than $2 million. The Daily Illini reported 10 participants at a cost of $3 million. The Tribune reported in May 2009 that there were about 425 students enrolled. White and director of the program, Chet Gardner, continued to pursue the initiative with the support of the Board of Trustees despite concerns from some students and faculty. Faculty expressed concern that the program would debase regular university degrees, while the Illinois Student Senate and student trustees expressed concern about wasting money. The Chicago Tribune reported that trustees discovered that several members of Global Campus staff had been paid from one to eight-percent bonuses, despite under enrollment and costs in excess of $10 million. On White's recommendation to the board of trustees, the Global Campus Partnership was terminated in 2009 due to an inadequate number of programs and students. Responsibility for on-line education was assigned to the university's campuses and colleges.

In February 2007 the University of Illinois Board of Trustees announced an end to the Urbana-Champaign campus tradition of Chief Illiniwek. White supported the board's decision saying, "While I understand many people have strong feelings about this 80-year-old tradition, for the good of our student-athletes and our university it is time to come together and move on to the next chapter in the history of this distinguished institution."

==== Clout scandal ====
The controversy over admissions practices ended White's presidency. The Chicago Tribune reported on May 29, 2009, that several students had been admitted to the university based upon connections or recommendations by members of the Board of Trustees, politicians, and members of the administration of former Illinois Governor Rod Blagojevich. In a statement, White observed that it "is the case that we track inquiries and expressions of interest in particular applicants by key alumni, political officials, trustees and others..." The Tribune reported that, "In one case, a relative of Antoin "Tony" Rezko, the now-convicted influence peddler for former Gov. Rod Blagojevich, got admitted after White wrote an email stating that the governor 'has expressed his support, and would like to see admitted' Rezko's relative and another applicant." The controversy sparked condemnation from student trustee Paul Schmitt and state lawmakers. As a result of the clout controversy, several lawmakers including Representatives Naomi Jakobsson, Chapin Rose, and Bill Black called for legislative investigations. Chairman of the Illinois House of Higher Education Committee, Representative Mike Boland, called for White's resignation, as well as several administrators including Urbana campus Chancellor Richard Herman and members of the Board of Trustees, saying "They were trusted to protect our university. In my eyes, they failed in that regard and they should resign." The University of Illinois clout scandal resulted in most members of the university's board of trustees resigning and new members being appointed by Governor Pat Quinn. The controversy erupted when Chicago Tribune reported on May 29, 2009, that several students had been admitted to the university based upon connections or recommendations by members of the board of trustees, politicians, and members of the administration of former Illinois Governor Rod Blagojevich. The controversy centered on the university's Urbana-Champaign campus, headed by Chancellor Richard Herman, who was heavily implicated in the improprieties along with the university's board of trustees. According to the article, some students were being admitted despite having sub-par qualifications. Drawing on documents obtained under the Freedom of Information Act, the Tribune said that, "The records chronicle a shadow admissions system in which some students won spots at the state's most prestigious public university over the protests of admissions officers, while others had their rejections reversed during an unadvertised appeal process." The investigation revealed that approximately 800 students over five years landed on the so-called "clout list" and, though not all were unworthy, the admission rate of these students was eight percentage points higher than the school average.

As the university faculty-student senate prepared to vote on whether to call for White's removal, he appeared before the group and claimed, "I stood behind every admissions denial, no matter who the advocates or how persistent they were." Nevertheless, the faculty-student senate passed a resolution on September 14 calling for his removal, along with that of the chancellor of the University of Illinois at Urbana-Champaign, the campus that was at the center of the admissions controversy. During a hearing on July 27, 2009, by a commission appointed by Governor Pat Quinn and chaired by former federal judge Abner Mikva, White admitted in response to a question that he had pushed for the admission of relative to the chancellor of the Urbana campus.

On September 23, 2009, he announced his resignation as president, effective December 31, 2009. In his resignation letter, White said he wanted to give the reconstituted Board of Trustees the freedom to choose new leadership. Saying he was sensitive to the financial sacrifices being made by faculty and staff due to difficult economic times, White timed his resignation to free the university of its obligation to pay him a $475,000 retention bonus that would have been due in February.

== Honors ==
While serving as president, White was honored with the Leadership Award (December 2005) from the Illinois Legislative Latino Caucus Foundation and the Dr. Martin Luther King, Jr. Excellence in Leadership Award (January 2007) from the Illinois Commission on Diversity and Human Relations. He served as a board member of the American Council on Education, the National Merit Honor Scholarship Program and the Argonne National Laboratory.

Academic offices
Preceded by Gilbert Whitaker	Dean of the Ross School of Business; 1990–2001	Succeeded by Robert J. Dolan
Preceded by Lee Bollinger	President of the University of Michigan (interim); 2001–2002	Succeeded by Mary Sue Coleman
Preceded by James J. Stukel	President of the University of Illinois; 2005–2010	Succeeded by (interim) Stanley O. Ikenberry, (permanent) Michael Hogan
