= Arthur Cutts Willard =

American academic administrator (1878–1960)

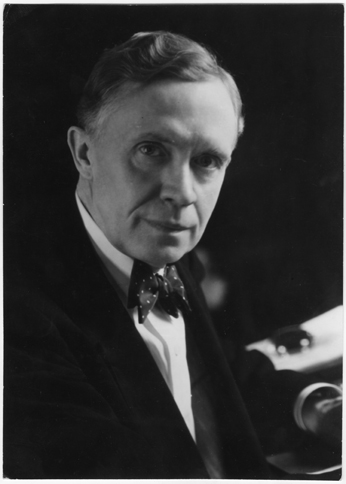
- Willard, courtesy of University of Illinois Archives

9th President of the University of Illinois system
- In office 1934–1946
- Preceded by: Arthur H. Daniels
- Succeeded by: George D. Stoddard

Personal details
- Born: August 12, 1878 Washington, D.C., U.S.
- Died: November 11, 1960 (aged 82) Champaign, Illinois, U.S.
- Spouse: Sarah Lamborn Willard (m. 1907)
- Education: Massachusetts Institute of Technology; George Washington University

Arthur Cutts Willard (August 12, 1878 – November 11, 1960) was the ninth president of the University of Illinois and an innovator in the field of heating and ventilation. Known for being approachable, a gentleman and well-dressed; he was known and admired by many. He received worldwide acclaim for his research and contribution to the heating, ventilating field; in particular for his contributions to the Holland Tunnel. In addition to his contributions to heating and ventilation industry, Willard was an educator in heating and ventilation and mechanical engineering between 1906 and 1933. He taught at George Washington University and the University of Illinois. Willard was appointed president in 1934 and served until 1946. Although he served as president during a difficult time for the university and the nation, he continued to have the highest expectations of his students. During his time as president he obtained funding for construction and addition of many buildings on the University of Illinois campuses. Willard strongly believed education needed to be more broad and focus on the social and economic problems facing the nation. At the end of service to the university, the Institute of Aviation was established at University of Illinois Willard Airport, and it was named in honor of A.C. Willard.

== Early life and career ==
Arthur Cutts Willard was born on August 12, 1878, in Washington, D.C., the only child of Alexander and Sarah Cutts Willard, both natives of Maine. Willard graduated from Central High School in Washington D.C in 1897. He then spent two years at the National College of Pharmacy at George Washington University. He graduated from Massachusetts Institute of Technology in 1904 with a bachelor of science degree in chemical engineering.

Willard had many career changes after graduating from MIT. He returned to George Washington University in 1906 to become an assistant professor of mechanical engineering. In 1909 he became assistant sanitary and heating engineer in Army Quartermaster Corp and two years later he became full engineer. In 1913, he left Kentucky to come to the University of Illinois to serve as an assistant professor in heating and ventilation. In 1917 he was named full professor in the mechanical engineering department. The majority of his work at the University of Illinois was related to ventilation and refrigeration. During this year he also served as an engineer consultant for the army encampments and for the bureau of mines. In 1920 he became the head of the mechanical engineering department. Willard also served as a consultant on ventilation to chemical war service and adviser to national public health. He authored several books such as Heating and Ventilation as well as, Power Plans and Refrigeration.

Willard is most famous for his work with the Holland Tunnel. One of the most challenging aspects of the project was the ventilation system; it was crucial that a method for removing dangerous fumes from the tunnel was developed. His ventilation studies made construction of the tunnel possible. The Holland Tunnel was the first mechanically ventilated underwater vehicular tunnel. An illustration of the model of the tunnel can be found at http://www.library.illinois.edu/archives/archon/index.php?p=digitallibrary/digitalcontent&id=6107.The Holland Tunnel system was eventually used elsewhere in the United States and around the world. In the fall of 1933, he began serving as dean of the College of Engineering after the position was made vacant by Professor Milo S. Ketchum.

== Presidency ==
Willard began serving as university president on July 1, 1934. He dispensed the traditional services due to his dislike for public acknowledgment. In acknowledgment of being bestowed with the honor of president of the University of Illinois he made the following statement: "The Presidency of the University of Illinois is a great honor, but a much greater responsibility: The University of Illinois was founded to serve the people and the industries of the state and the record of its accomplishments is written largely in the lives of its alumni. The opportunity and the need for worthwhile service to the state is probably greater than ever before in the history of the University. This opportunity will be met with all the resources at the disposal of the faculty and scientific staff of the University both in Urbana–Champaign and in Chicago." When Willard accepted the presidency, he was prepared to make changes to the current way students were educated. "We are going to have a new order of things in this country. Somebody may know what it will be—I don't. But I know this much—the universities are going to have to do a better job of turning out men and women who can take care of themselves. The average college graduate ... has been prepared for everything but life."

Willard received the presidency during a difficult time in history; the nation was facing the Great Depression. Financial resources were limited and task of rebuilding confidence in the future was Willard's most important task. One of Willard's objective of the university was to enlarge the faculty and develop a program for guidance for high school graduates expecting to attend the university.

Willard spoke on major issues facing the campus. He believed education needed to include courses that focused on the social sciences and humanities. Currently the collegiate education system offers students four years of a technical training, while neglecting a liberal education background. A liberal education background offers students an understanding of modern society and produces a more well-rounded intelligent student. Willard felt that the first two years should be devoted to general courses in the sciences, arts, literature and basic subject matter important to technical training in the final two years of study.

Although Willard's academic background was in engineering, he had criticisms of engineering education; "engineers should develop a far better knowledge of the social and economic problems of modern society than he has so far acquired either by his education or experience.". Willard also argued that scientists focused on technology, therefore the social and economic problems of society have not been recognized. Willard was concerned about some of the activities fraternities engaged in. He believe that "hell week" in fraternities needed to be abolished. He felt as though fraternities should be cultural centers, that focus on extra-curricular activities; not tormenting or harassing those seeking acceptance into the fraternity.

Willard also communicated his opinion of issues that indirectly affected the campus. In 1935, he felt that a major problem for the US was motor traffic. The number of vehicle fatalities was very large and he felt as though the problem should be dealt with through education. Willard's dedication to this issue was evident in his membership to the newly created Illinois Highway Safety Commission; the purpose of the committee was to find a solution to deaths caused by reckless driving. The committee also sought to study accident problem and correlate efforts between state and local authorities.

Willard's most memorable achievements were the funding and development of campus buildings. Willard felt the student center was inadequate; therefore he worked obtain funding for a new student center. University of Illinois Foundation was established to assist in obtaining funding for the new student center. After two years of construction the Illini Union was formally dedicated on November 1, 1941. The Abbott Power Plant was also established during Willard's reign as president; the power plant enabled expansion of the University of Illinois at Urbana–Champaign campus. McKinley Hospital was also constructed during Willard's presidency. Due to budget constraints Willard had to make decisions on which projects were most important. Willard concluded that an addition to the library and more classroom space was more pressing than a male dormitory.

== Family and personal life ==
Willard married Sarah Lamborn on November 26, 1907. She was a graduate of Washington D.C. public schools and of the Normal school (university) in Washington D.C. While they had no children, they treated their nieces and faculty's children with as much care as if they were their own. After thirty three years at the University of Illinois, Willard retired on September 1, 1946. On September 11, 1960, he died at McKinley Hospital at the age of 82.

== Honors and awards ==
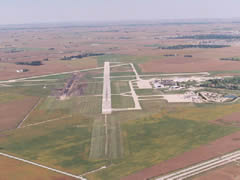
Willard Airport

On October 26, 1945, the University of Illinois Willard Airport was named in his honor.

Willard was accepted into many academic societies, fraternities and organizations Member of the following organizations

- American Society of Mechanical Engineers
- American Society of Heating and Ventilating Engineers
- Society for Promotion of Engineering Education
- American Society of Refrigerating Engineers
- National Warm Air Heating and Air Conditioning association
- Illinois Society of Engineers

Member of the following fraternities

- Sigma Xi
- Phi Kappa Phi
- Tau Beta Pi
- Triangle
- Sigma Tau
- Pi Tau Sigma
- Omega Chi Epsilon
- Phi Eta Sigma
- Phi Kappa Sigma

Member of the following clubs

- Chicago Engineers Club
- University Club of Chicago
- University Club of Urbana
- Chaos Club of Chicago
- Urbana Rotary Club
- Champaign–Urbana Kiwanis Club

On January 26, 1936, Willard received the F. Paul Anderson Gold Medal from the American Society of Heating and Ventilating Engineers for his work with the Holland Tunnel, research, commitment to teaching and service to the society.
