= University of Illinois clout scandal =

University admission scandal

The University of Illinois clout scandal resulted from a series of articles in the Chicago Tribune that reported that some applicants to the University of Illinois at Urbana–Champaign (UIUC) "received special consideration" for acceptance between 2005 and 2009, despite having sub-par qualifications. The series began on May 29, 2009. An investigatory committee appointed by Illinois governor Pat Quinn was formed a few weeks later. The controversy led to the resignation of B. Joseph White, president of the University of Illinois, who oversaw the three campuses in the university system, and Richard Herman, chancellor of UIUC. The scandal eventually spread to include evidence of graft by members of the Board of Trustees, resulting in the resignation of seven of the nine members.

== Initial findings ==
On May 29, 2009, the Chicago Tribune published "Clout Goes to College," an article detailing preferential consideration to applicants with connections to politicians and university trustees. According to the article, some students were being admitted despite having sub-par qualifications. The investigation revealed that approximately 800 students over five years landed on the so-called "clout list" and, though not all were unworthy, the admission rate of these students was eight percentage points higher than the school average. One student was accepted into the graduate business school after having been rejected three times. Prior to acceptance, university officials did not confirm whether he had a bachelor's degree from an accredited university.

A panel appointed by the governor to investigate the scandal found that the board of trustees had acted improperly and exerted continuing pressure on University officials. The panel "put much of the blame on Richard Herman, chancellor of the university's flagship campus in Urbana–Champaign, saying his conduct was inconsistent with the university's 'principles of ethical conduct and fair dealing.'" Many of the thousands of pages of e-mails and other documents released by the university in response to a Freedom of Information Act (FOIA) request involved communication with Herman. The panel also found fault with University president B. Joseph White. Upon first release, the most notable student to receive special consideration was a relative of Tony Rezko, who was convicted on sixteen charges of fraud and bribery and was a political contributor to then-governor Rod Blagojevich. In one email, White wrote to Urbana chancellor Herman that Blagojevich "has expressed his support, and would like to see admitted" two applicants, including Rezko's relative. The university had rejected the application of Rezko's relative earlier in the day, but later reversed the decision despite poor ACT scores. Other state officials implicated in providing special influence over admissions were Illinois Senate president John Cullerton, House Speaker Michael Madigan, state treasurer Alexi Giannoulias, U.S. Representative Tim Johnson, and Illinois Representatives Bill Mitchell and Chapin Rose.

=== Students who benefited from clout ===
Most of the students who benefited from political connections came from elite and affluent high schools. Among the least connected were students who attended Chicago Public Schools. Wealthier schools already had an advantage due to families who had political connections to elected officials and university trustees. High schools that had the most applicants on the clout list included Highland Park High School, Deerfield High School, New Trier High School, Glenbrook North High School, Glenbrook South High School, Loyola Academy, St. Ignatius College Preparatory School, Fenwick High School, Benet Academy, Hinsdale Central High School, Carl Sandburg High School, and York Community High School.

== Controversy and resignations with Board of Trustees ==
The university is overseen by a board of trustees consisting of nine members appointed by the governor for six-year terms, as well as three students. The board oversees the operation of the three campuses and is intended to be a watchdog of and advocate for the university. Trustee Larry Eppley, board chairman from 2002 to 2008, was the first to resign, with a higher number of admissions request than any other member. The next chairman of the board, Niranjan Shah, announced his resignation from the board thereafter amid allegations that he had meddled with applications and had pressured the university to hire one of his relatives. Trustees Ed McMillan, David Doris, Robert Vickrey, Devon Bruce, and Kenneth Schmidt followed. Only James Montgomery and Francis Carroll held out.

== University and state response ==
White stated on May 29, 2009, that, "There's no secret clout list. The Tribune invented the term 'secret clout list'." White stated the following day, "To the extent some problems were pointed out, we can and will correct them." University Chancellor Richard Herman also pledged to investigate the findings.

On June 10, 2009, Illinois governor Pat Quinn announced that he appointed a panel to investigate the allegations, led by former judge Abner Mikva. The investigation confirmed that the university filed some students as "Category I" applicants, meaning that they had connections from influential individuals. Their applications were designated with a red stripe. State Senator Kirk Dillard later proposed a bill that would immediately fire all nine university trustees. The university law school responded by forbidding any inquiries on admission status unless made by the applicant. According to the former law Dean Heidi Hurd, the law school admitted "about 15 students" from the clout list during her five-year tenure. When Hurd emailed Herman about one candidate who was particularly poorly-qualified, Herman stated that university trustees would find jobs for five students after graduation to preserve the school's ranking.

Although Hurd claimed in a letter to the Chicago Tribune that the portions of her e-mail exchanges with Herman appearing to be quid-pro-quo deals were purely sarcastic, the chairman of the commission investigating the scandal, ex-federal judge Abner Mikva, dismissed Hurd's claims that the comments were 'sarcastic and facetious'.

On July 6, 2009, several law faculty collectively wrote an open letter to the Tribune, protesting the coverage as incomplete, biased and inflammatory.

During a hearing on July 27, 2009, at the Beckman Center on the Champaign–Urbana campus, White stated in response to a question that he had informed the chancellor of the Urbana campus of the application of a relative.

== Involvement of other schools ==
Patrick Fitzgerald, who prosecuted Blagojevich on corruption charges, also subpoenaed Northern Illinois University and Southern Illinois University regarding correspondence between the former governor and admission offices. The Southern Illinois University School of Law on the Carbondale campus revealed that Blagojevich submitted letters of recommendation for two students, but neither was admitted.

== Commission findings ==
The commission led by Mikva found that trustees, deans, White, and Herman, all contributed to "substantial...admission-related abuses and irregularities."

The panel's recommendation include, but are not limited to:

- Calling "on all members of the Board of Trustees to voluntarily submit their resignations and thereby permit the Governor to determine which Trustees should be reappointed."
- Urging the Governor to "charge the new Board with conducting a thorough and expeditious review of the University President, the UIUC Chancellor, and other University administrators, with respect to the information set forth in" the commission's Report.
- Recommending creation of a "firewall" that isolates school officials not involved with the admissions process.
- Urging input on the process to elect board of trustees members from other interested parties, especially the alumni groups.

Governor Patrick Quinn announced the following day that he would undertake the panel's recommendation and called for the resignations of all trustees. Former chairman Larry Eppley (appointed by Blagojevich) had already resigned, as had then recently appointed chairman Niranjan Shah (also appointed by Blagojevich). Trustee McMillan tendered his resignation in accordance with the panel's finding. David Doris, Robert Vickrey, Devon Bruce, and Kenneth Schmidt also resigned, leaving two hold outs.

== White's resignation ==
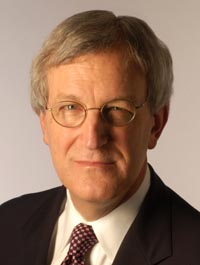
Bernard Joseph White

On October 3, 2009, the University Board of Trustees accepted the resignation of President White (see related section) as of the end of the year. White timed his resignation to free the university from paying a $475,000 bonus that would have been due to him in February. Christopher Kennedy, who had taken over as board chairman, said of White, "He is a class act and I think his decision today will contribute to his reputation." In accepting White's resignation, the Board named as a temporary replacement Stanley Ikenberry. Ikenberry had been president at the university from 1979 through 1995.

The University of Illinois Board of Trustees then named Michael J. Hogan, formerly the president of the University of Connecticut, to succeed Ikenberry and become the permanent president of the University of Illinois. Hogan later resigned on March 23, 2012 "after months of turmoil, a faculty mutiny and a scandal in the president's office" having lasted 20 months in the position. The university then said veteran administrator Bob Easter would take over the presidency.

== See also ==
- University of Texas admissions controversy
