= Coupling, Energetics and Dynamics of Atmospheric Regions =

Coupling, Energetics and Dynamics of Atmospheric Regions (CEDAR) is a US NSF funded program targeting understanding of middle and upper atmospheric dynamics. CEDAR is of relevance to space weather, space physics, and global change.

CEDAR involves researchers from institutions within and without the United States, although the funding is almost exclusively directed to US projects. Researchers are funded for observational, theoretical, and simulation work. There is a significant focus on student activities and CEDAR has been involved a large number of graduate students in front-line research.

CEDAR programs produce a significant amount of data which is accessible via the CEDAR Data Bases, a number of Virtual Observatories (VOs), and the web pages of principal investigators (PIs).
