= University of Illinois System =

Public university system in Illinois

- Type: System of public universities
- Established: 1867; 159 years ago
- Endowment: $3.82 billion (2023)
- Budget: $7.7 billion (2023) (system-wide)
- President: Timothy L. Killeen
- Vice-president: Marie Lynn Miranda
- Students: 94,750
- Location: Illinois, United States
- Campus: Chicago; Springfield; Urbana-Champaign
- Colors: Blue
- Website: uillinois.edu

University of Illinois System main campuses

The University of Illinois System is a system of public universities in the U.S. state of Illinois, consisting of three campuses located in Chicago, Springfield, and Urbana-Champaign. Across all campuses, the University of Illinois System enrolls more than 101,000 students. It had an operating budget of $7.18 billion in 2021. Its oldest university, University of Illinois Urbana-Champaign, was established as the state's land grant university in 1867.

== Organization ==
The University of Illinois System consists of three campuses in Illinois Urbana-Champaign, Chicago, and Springfield. The university in Urbana-Champaign is known as "Illinois", "U of I", or "UIUC", whereas the Chicago campus is known as "UIC" and the Springfield campus as "UIS".

The system is governed by a board of trustees consisting of thirteen members: the governor of Illinois serves as an ex officio member, nine trustees are appointed by the governor of Illinois, and a student trustee elected by referendum represents each of the system's three universities. One of the three student trustees is designated by the governor to have a vote.

The U of I System is led by the president, an executive vice president, a CFO/vice president of finance, a vice president for economic development and innovation, and the chancellors that lead each of the three universities. System leadership works to develop strategies and solutions to address educational and administrative challenges across the system. Centralized system offices staff support the work of the three universities by providing critical services that are vital to its missions.

=== Chicago ===
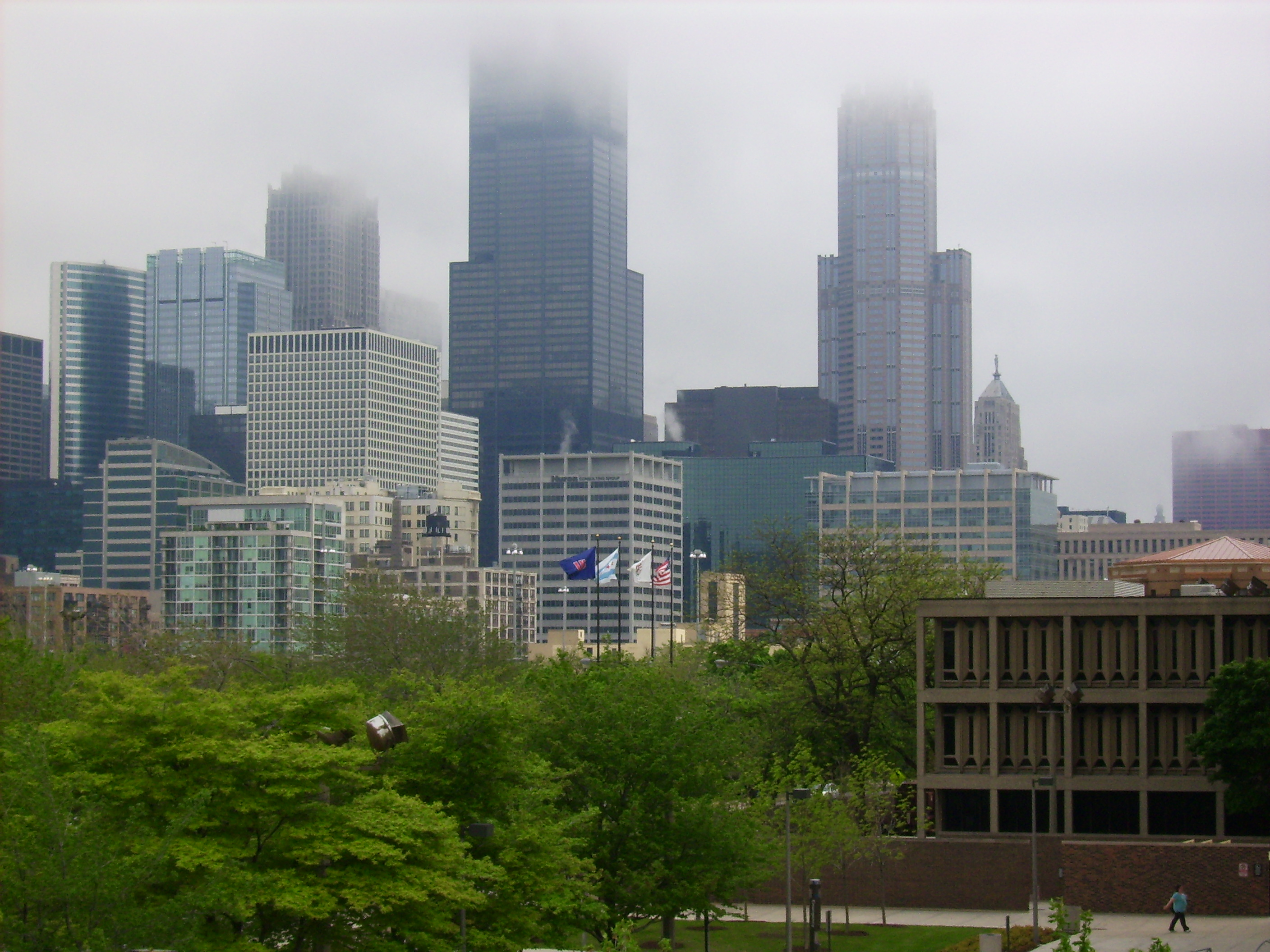
The Chicago Loop as seen from the UIC campus

The largest university in the Chicago area, UIC serves approximately 34,000 students within 16 colleges & schools including Applied Health Sciences, Architecture, Design, and the Arts, Business Administration, Dentistry, Education, Engineering, Graduate, Honors, Liberal Arts & Sciences, Nursing, Pharmacy, Public Health, Social Work, Urban Planning & Public Affairs, Law, and the College of Medicine (largest branch of three branches of the medical school) which is one of the nation's largest medical schools. With annual research expenditures exceeding $394 million, UIC is one of five doctoral research universities in the State of Illinois. Playing a critical role in Illinois healthcare, UIC operates the state's major public medical center and serves as the principal educator of Illinois' physicians, dentists, pharmacists, nurses and other healthcare professionals. The University of Illinois Hospital & Health Sciences System (a.k.a. "UI Health"), which includes the hospital, clinics, and health science colleges, is a part of UIC.

The modern UIC was formed in 1982 by the consolidation of two campuses: the Medical Center campus, which dates back to the 19th century; and the comprehensive Chicago Circle campus, which in 1965 replaced the two-year undergraduate Navy Pier campus designated to educate returning veterans.

Their athletic program is member of the Missouri Valley Conference and NCAA Division I.

=== Springfield ===
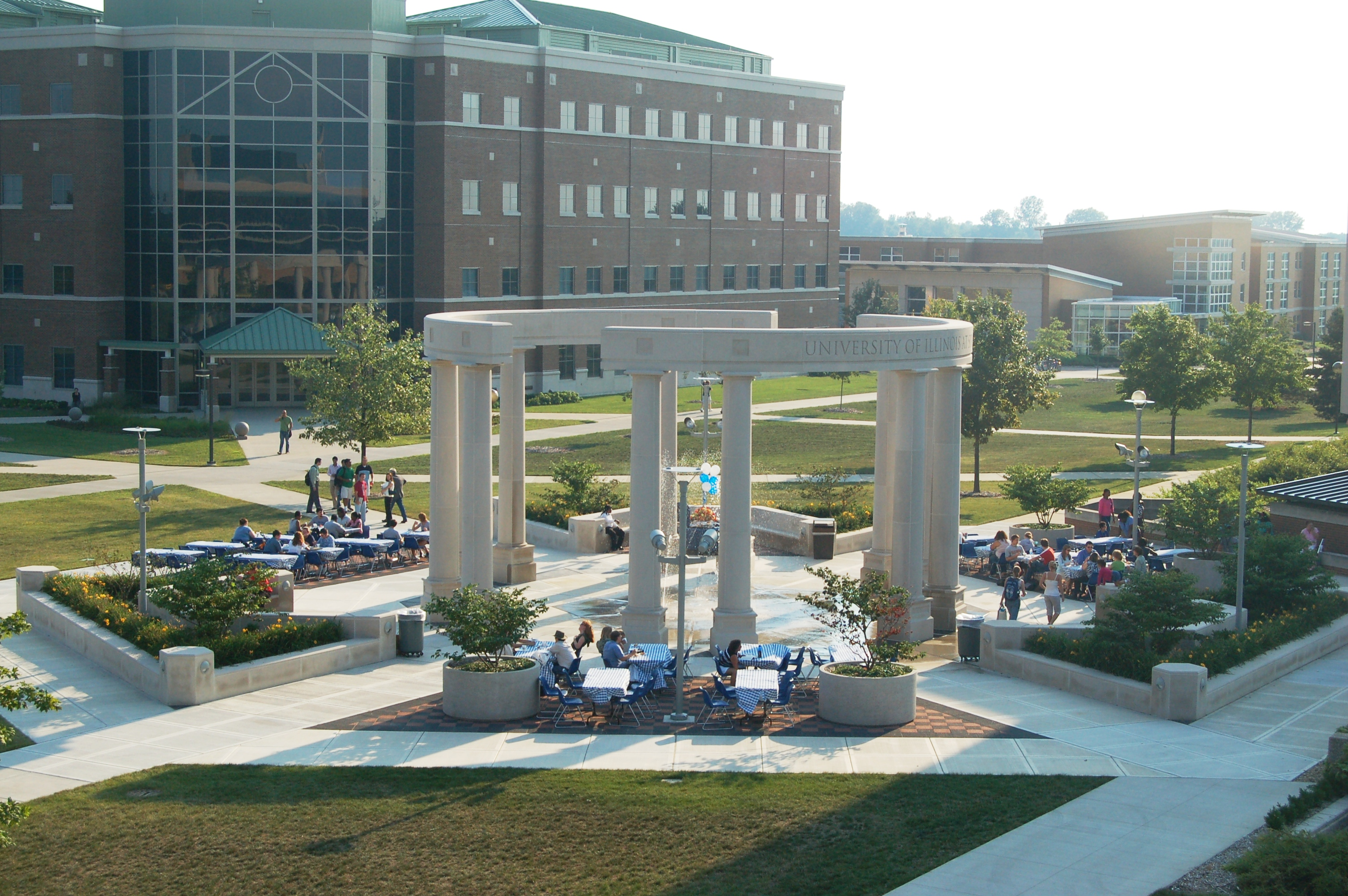
University of Illinois Springfield campus

The newest university in the system is University of Illinois Springfield. It is located in Springfield, the state capital of Illinois. When it opened in 1969, it was named Sangamon State University, and was exclusively an upper-level university, serving only upperclassmen and graduate students. In 1995, Sangamon State joined the University of Illinois system and was renamed as the University of Illinois Springfield. The University of Illinois System then transitioned the school from an upper division university into a full four-year institution with an undergraduate program.

UIS is the smallest university in the University of Illinois System, with an enrollment of approximately 4,000 students. UIS offers more than 50 degree-granting programs. The academic curriculum of the university emphasizes a liberal arts core, an array of professional programs, opportunities in experiential education, and an engagement in public affairs issues in its academic and community service pursuits. UIS has the lowest student/teacher ratio of all three universities in the U of I System.

Their athletic program is member of the Great Lakes Valley Conference and NCAA Division II.

=== Urbana–Champaign ===
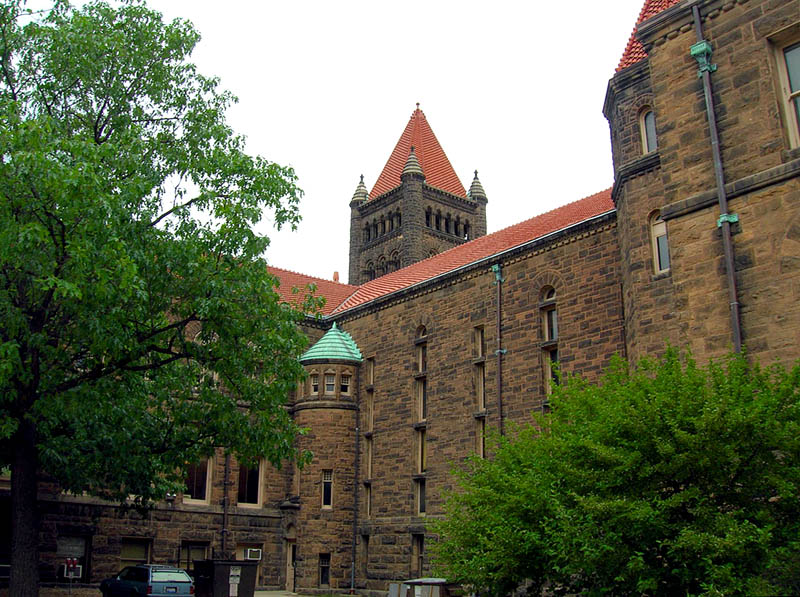
Altgeld Hall on the Urbana campus

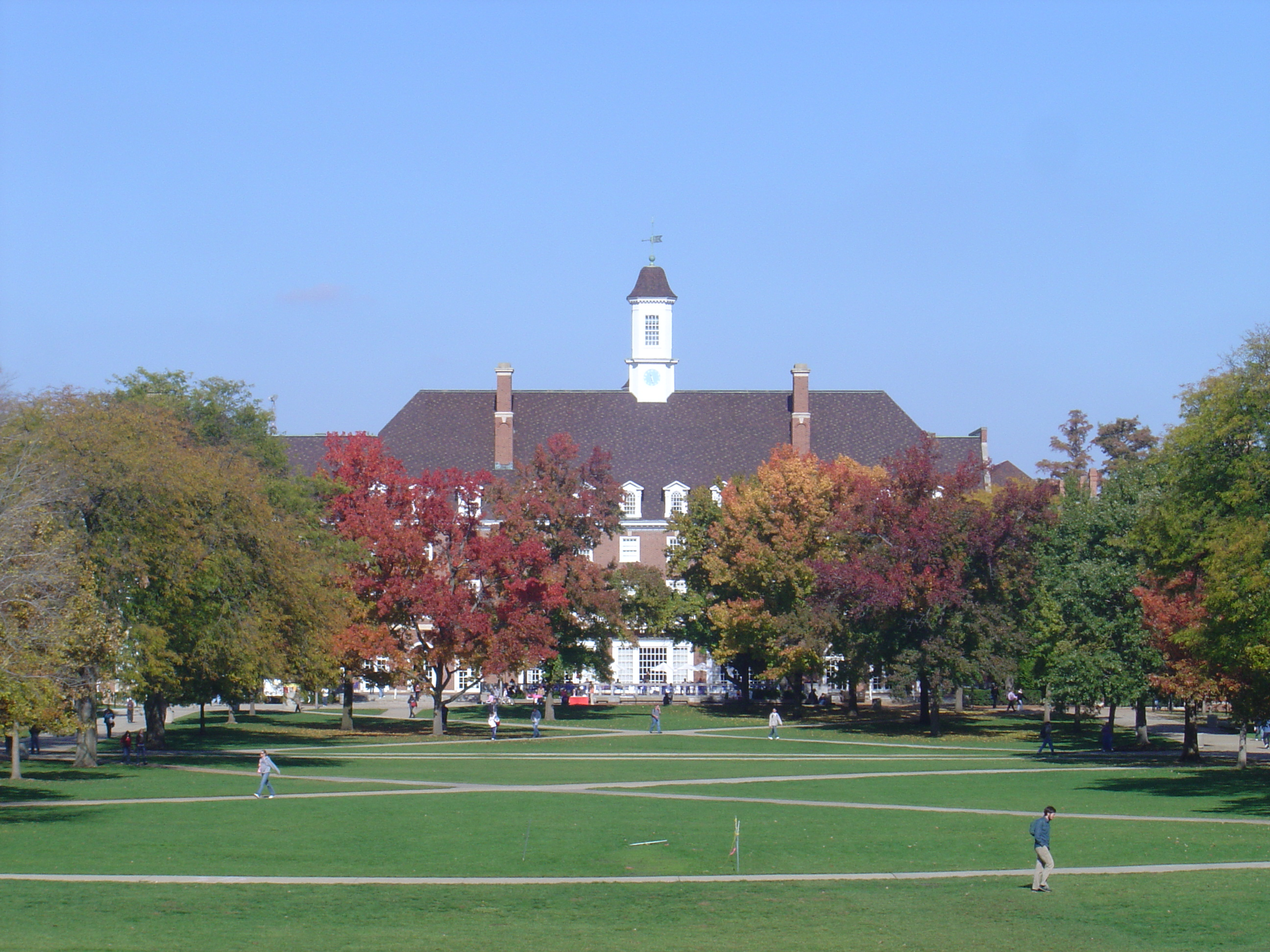
Illini Union on the Urbana campus

The Urbana-Champaign campus was founded in 1867 as the Illinois Industrial University. It was one of the 37 public land-grant institutions created shortly after Abraham Lincoln signed the Morrill Act in 1862. The university changed its name to University of Illinois in 1885, and then again to University of Illinois Urbana-Champaign in 1982. The University of Illinois Urbana-Champaign is the largest and most prestigious of the three universities, enrolling more than 56,000 students. UIUC is home to 17 colleges and instructional units including the College of Agricultural, Consumer, and Environmental Sciences; College of Applied Health Sciences; the Gies College of Business; College of Education; the Grainger College of Engineering; College of Fine and Applied Arts; Division of General Studies; Graduate College; School of Labor and Employment Relations; College of Law; College of Liberal Arts and Sciences; School of Information Sciences; College of Media; Carle Illinois College of Medicine; School of Social Work; and the College of Veterinary Medicine.

It is also home to the National Center for Supercomputing Applications, NCSA, where Marc Andreessen (of Netscape fame) and others helped develop the Mosaic web browser, the first HTML browser capable of rendering images. In addition, in 1987, NCSA created NCSA Telnet, a program which permitted users access to the supercomputer's resources remotely. The petascale Blue Waters was among the world's fastest supercomputers when it went into service in 2012.

UIUC and its alumni are particularly well known for their contributions to engineering, including inventions such as the LED, plasma screen, and the integrated circuit. The library is notable both for being the largest public academic library in the country, with over forty departmental libraries, and for possessing over twelve million volumes. Each year, the library circulates about 1.2 million items and answers about 293,000 reference questions. The university is highly ranked in psychology, engineering, law, library and information science, chemistry, computer science, labor and industrial relations, educational psychology, finance, accounting, business administration, communication, and music. Physics professor John Bardeen won the Nobel Prize in Physics twice in his lifetime, an honor no other researcher has received. The school's marching band, named the Marching Illini, also enjoys a superb reputation. Until 2007, the symbol of the university's athletic teams was a Native American figure, Chief Illiniwek, which sparked significant controversy. Chief Illiniwek completed his last performance on February 21, 2007, and has since been retired from performing and as the official symbol of the school.

In 2017, the University of Illinois System launched the Discovery Partners Institute (DPI), a center for tech workforce development and applied R&D in Chicago. It is part of the Illinois Innovation Network and is run by the UIUC Grainger College of Engineering.

Their athletic program is member of the Big Ten Conference and NCAA Division I.

=== Rockford, Peoria, and Quad Cities regional campuses ===
The University of Illinois operates regional campuses in Rockford, Peoria, and the Quad Cities region. The College of Medicine operates on three total campuses, located in Chicago, Rockford, and Peoria. The largest medical campus, Chicago, is located on the west campus of UIC alongside UI Health. The Peoria and Rockford campuses partner with local hospitals for medical education as neither location has University-affiliated hospitals. The Peoria campus also hosts the College of Pharmacy in addition to other programs as a campus of the University of Springfield. The College of Nursing, in addition to locations at all main and regional campuses, operates a campus in the Quad Cities region bordering Iowa.

== Foundation ==
The University of Illinois Foundation is the official fundraising and gift agency of the University of Illinois System. It operates on behalf of the three institutions within the U of I system including the hospital in Chicago. Most of the $3.82 billion endowment is assigned to support the Urbana campus, which is the oldest and largest part of the system.

== Alumni associations ==
Each of the three universities has an alumni organization: the University of Illinois Alumni Association (Urbana-Champaign), the UIC Alumni Association, and University of Illinois Springfield Alumni Relations. Collectively, the University of Illinois System has one of the world's largest alumni networks with more than 810,000 members internationally.
