= Forrest L. Vosler =

Medal of Honor recipient (1923–1992)

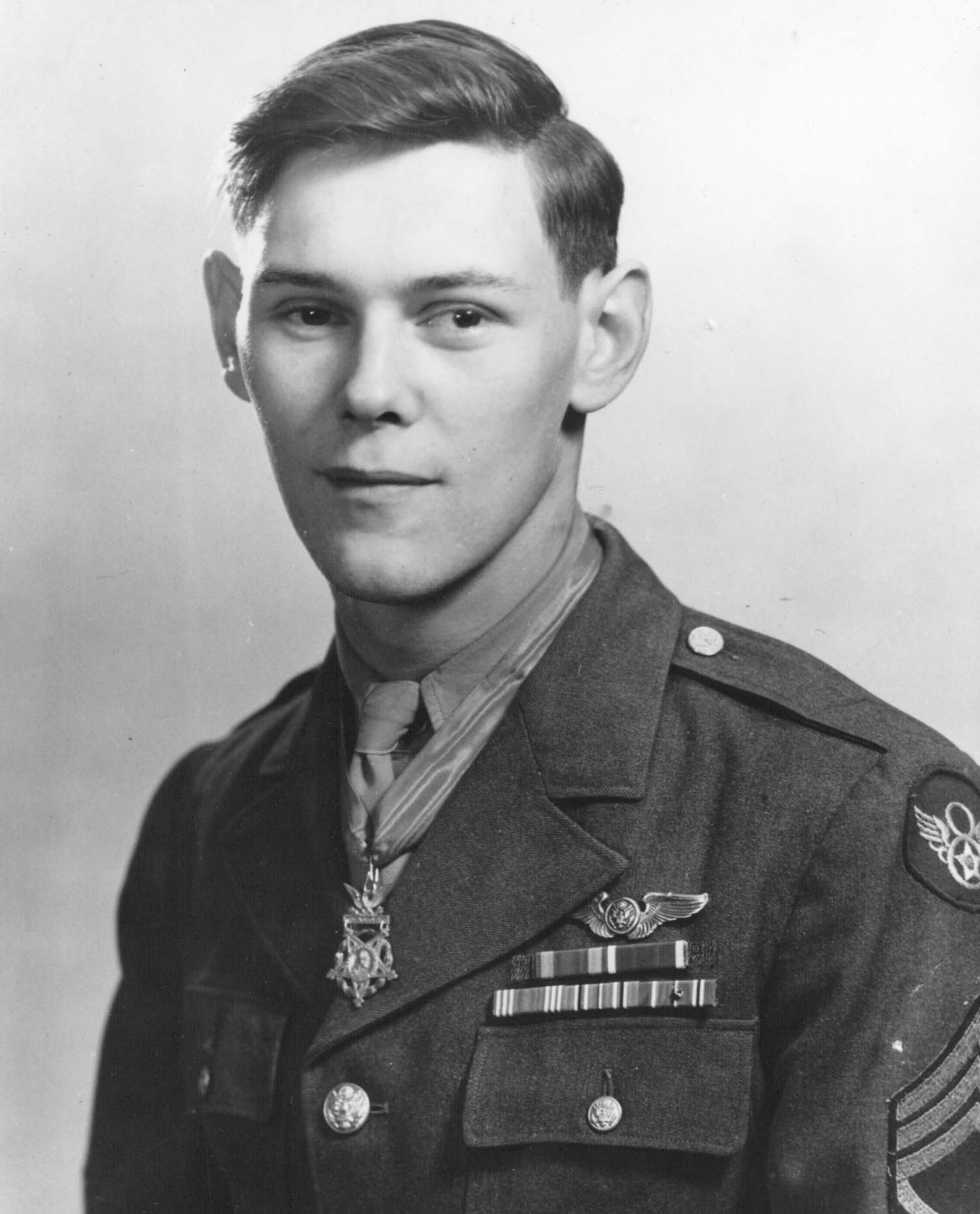
- Born: July 29, 1923; Lyndonville, New York, U.S.
- Died: February 17, 1992 (aged 68); Titusville, Florida, U.S.
- Burial place: Arlington National Cemetery
- Military career
- Allegiance: United States
- Branch: Army Air Forces
- Service years: 1942–1944
- Rank: Technical Sergeant
- Units: 358th Bombardment Squadron, 303rd Bomb Group (Heavy)
- Conflicts: World War II
- Awards: Medal of Honor; Purple Heart

Forrest Lee Vosler (July 29, 1923 – February 17, 1992) was a Boeing B-17 Flying Fortress radio operator who was the second enlisted U.S. airman to receive the Medal of Honor.

== Early life ==
Vosler was born at Lyndonville, New York in 1923 to William I. Vosler and Lottie (Furness) Vosler. He attended Livonia Central High School in New York and graduated in 1941. Following graduation, he was employed as a drill press operator by General Motors at Rochester, New York.

== World War II ==
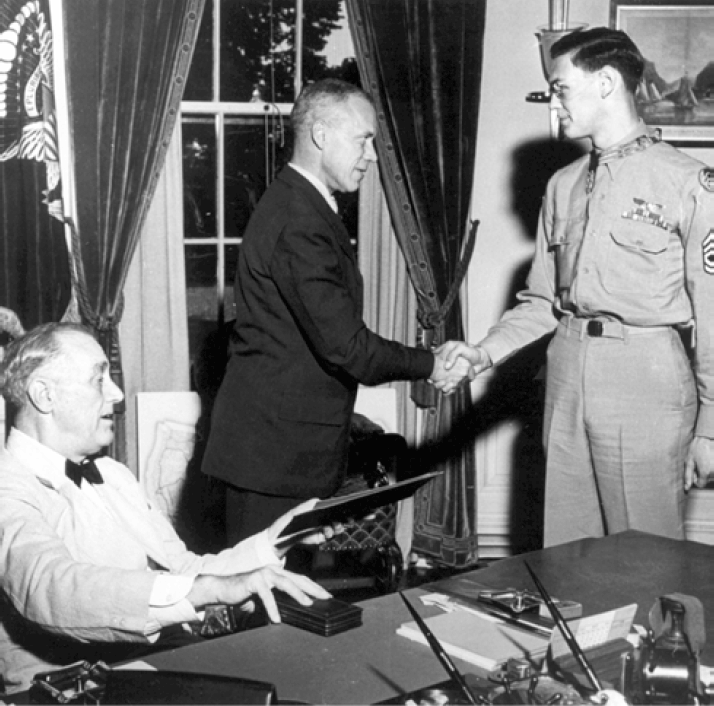
Vosler receives the Medal of Honor from President Franklin D. Roosevelt (1944)

Vosler enlisted as a private in the Army at Rochester, New York on October 8, 1942. He took basic training at Atlantic City, New Jersey, the Radio Operator and Mechanics School at Scott Field, Illinois; and Flexible Gunnery School at Harlingen, Texas. By May 22, 1943, he had successfully completed his training and three days later was promoted to sergeant. He was promoted to staff sergeant in August at Pyote, Texas, while awaiting overseas movement. In October 1943, he deployed to Europe as a radio operator and aerial gunner on B-17s assigned to the 8th Air Force's 358th Bombardment Squadron (Heavy), 303rd Bombardment Group (Heavy) based at RAF Molesworth, England. At approximately 8:30 a.m. on December 20, 1943, Staff Sergeant Vosler took off on his fourth combat mission. His aircraft, on its 28th combat mission, was a B-17F named the "Jersey Bounce Jr.," S/N 42-29664. The plane and crew reached the target area of Bremen, Germany, just before noon. The bombers encountered concentrated, accurate and intense flak over Axis territory. In addition to the anti-aircraft fire, about 125 German fighters repeatedly attacked the formation. This was a costly mission for the 8th Air Force as a total of 27 bombers were lost including the Jersey Bounce Jr. after it ditched in the North Sea. Staff Sergeant Vosler was seriously wounded in action. Vosler was hit initially in the legs and thighs and then again in the face when 20-mm. cannon shells exploded in his aircraft, and his B-17 was forced out of formation. During the ditching, Vosler also saved the tail gunner's life. The badly wounded gunner (Sgt. George Buske) was removed from the still-floating ditched Fortress and put on one of the wings while the other crewmen prepared the life raft. Buske, unconscious, started to slide down the trailing edge of the wing into the water. Vosler grabbed him around his waist while using his other hand to hold an antenna wire to avoid falling into the cold water. Vosler accomplished this while coping with a badly wounded eye that resulted from an earlier exploding 20mm cannon shell that hit his gun position. Staff Sergeant Vosler was recommended for the Medal of Honor based on his heroism and was promoted to technical sergeant two weeks after this mission. He was confined to Air Force hospitals in England until his return to the United States in March 1944.

President Roosevelt presented him the Medal of Honor at the White House on September 6, 1944. Technical Sergeant Vosler continued to receive treatment at various hospitals until October 17, 1944, when he was honorably discharged from the service at Valley Forge General Hospital in Phoenixville, Pennsylvania.

== Later life ==
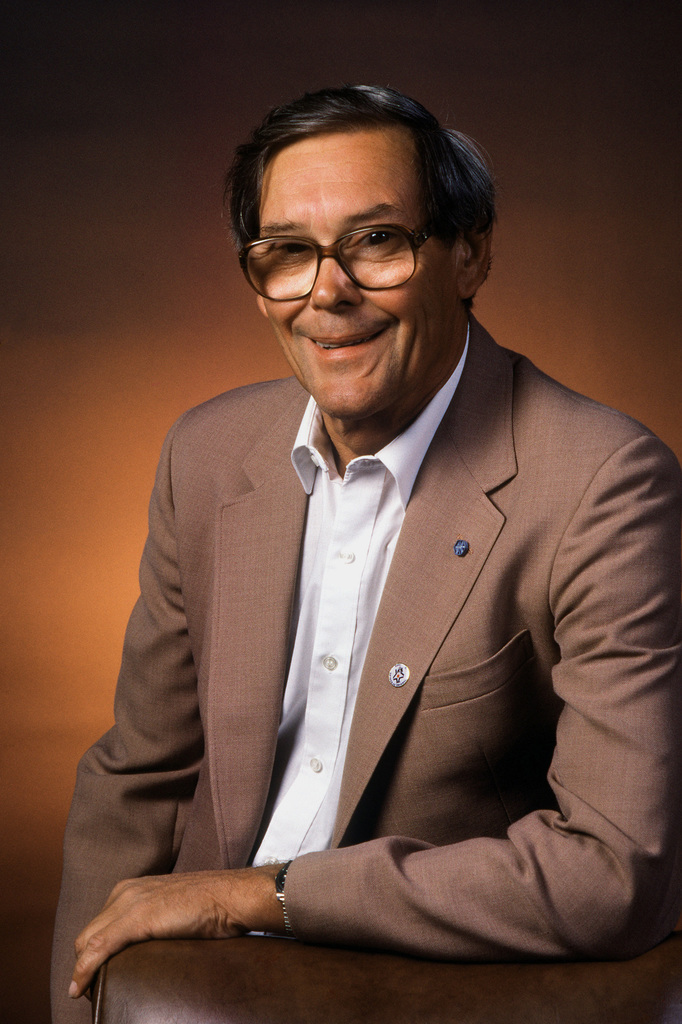
Forrest L. Vosler, circa 1986

On October 28, 1945, Vosler married Virginia Frances Slack. The couple had four children and three grandchildren.

Due to war injuries, he was unable to keep up with his studies and dropped out of Syracuse University at the end of the 1945 fall semester. He worked for the Veterans Administration for thirty years.

He died of heart attack on February 17, 1992 at Titusville, Florida, at the age of 68. He was buried at Arlington National Cemetery.

In 2015, he was posthumously awarded an associate of arts degree in liberal arts by Syracuse University. The degree was presented by Chancellor of Syracuse University Kent Syverud to Vosler's son, Steve.

== Military awards ==
Vosler's military decorations and awards include:

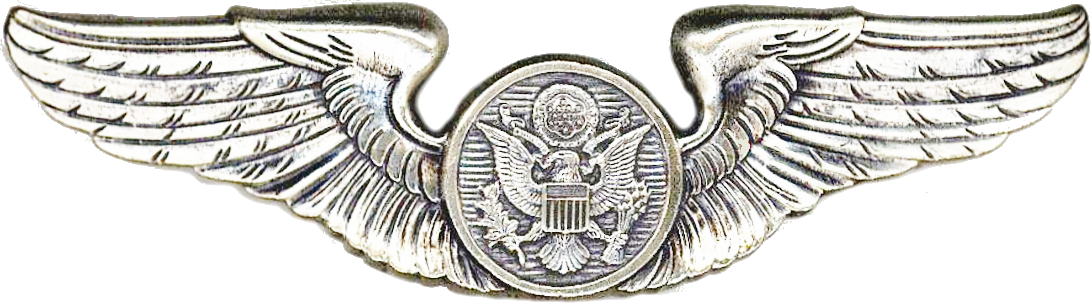

Badge	Aircrew Badge		
1st row	Medal of Honor		
2nd row	Air Medal	Purple Heart	Army Good Conduct Medal
3rd row	American Campaign Medal	European-African-Middle Eastern Campaign Medal w/one bronze service star for the Air Offensive, Europe campaign.	World War II Victory Medal
Unit Award	Presidential Unit Citation WDGO 50–44, 303rd Bombardment Group (Heavy) for mission of 11 Jan 44, per Department of the Air Force Pamphlet 900–2 Volume I, Book I dated June 15, 1971, page 292		

=== Medal of Honor citation ===
VOSLER, FORREST L. (Air Mission)

Rank and organization: Technical Sergeant, U.S. Army Air Forces. 358th Bomber Squadron, 303d Bomber Group. Place and date. Over Bremen, Germany, December 20, 1943. Entered service at: Rochester, New York. Born: July 29, 1923, Lyndonville, New York. G.O. No.: 73, September 6, 1944. Citation:

For conspicuous gallantry in action against the enemy above and beyond the call of duty while serving as a radio operator-air gunner on a heavy bombardment aircraft in a mission over Bremen, Germany, on 20 December 1943. After bombing the target, the aircraft in which T/Sgt. Vosler was serving was severely damaged by antiaircraft fire, forced out of formation, and immediately subjected to repeated vicious attacks by enemy fighters. Early in the engagement a 20-mm. cannon shell exploded in the radio compartment, painfully wounding T/Sgt. Vosler in the legs and thighs. At about the same time a direct hit on the tail of the ship seriously wounded the tail gunner and rendered the tail guns inoperative. Realizing the great need for firepower in protecting the vulnerable tail of the ship, T/Sgt. Vosler, with grim determination, kept up a steady stream of deadly fire. Shortly thereafter another 20-mm. enemy shell exploded, wounding T/Sgt. Vosler in the chest and about the face. Pieces of metal lodged in both eyes, impairing his vision to such an extent that he could only distinguish blurred shapes. Displaying remarkable tenacity and courage, he kept firing his guns and declined to take first-aid treatment. The radio equipment had been rendered inoperative during the battle, and when the pilot announced that he would have to ditch, although unable to see and working entirely by touch, T/Sgt. Vosler finally got the set operating and sent out distress signals despite several lapses into unconsciousness. When the ship ditched, T/Sgt. Vosler managed to get out on the wing by himself and hold the wounded tail gunner from slipping off until the other crewmembers could help them into the dinghy. T/Sgt. Vosler's actions on this occasion were an inspiration to all serving with him. The extraordinary courage, coolness, and skill he displayed in the face of great odds, when handicapped by injuries that would have incapacitated the average crewmember, were outstanding.

Taken from U.S. Air Force Biography

== See also ==
- List of Medal of Honor recipients
- List of Medal of Honor recipients for World War II
- Half a Wing, Three Engines and a Prayer
