= Rosyface chub =

Conservation status
- Least Concern (IUCN 3.1)

Scientific classification
- Kingdom: Animalia
- Phylum: Chordata
- Class: Actinopterygii
- Order: Cypriniformes
- Family: Leuciscidae
- Subfamily: Pogonichthyinae
- Genus: Hybopsis
- Species: H. rubrifrons

Binomial name
- Hybopsis rubrifrons (D. S. Jordan, 1877)

Synonyms
- Notropis rubescens Bailey, 1991; Nocomis rubrifrons D. S.Jordan, 1877

Species of fish

The rosyface chub (Hybopsis rubrifrons) is a species of freshwater ray-finned fish belonging to the family Leuciscidae, the shiners, daces and minnows. This species is found in the United States.

== Description ==
The fish is somewhat elongate and has a long snout. Its eyes are upward-looking and a barbel can be found in the corner of the mouth. It can reach a total length of 8.4 cm (3.25 in).

The fish is similar to bigeye chub. It has smaller eyes, however. During the breeding season in spring, the front third of the body becomes more red, usually most pronounced on the snout. They have 35 to 39 scales along the lateral line.

== Distribution and habitat ==
The range of the rosyface chub includes the Saluda, Savannah, Edisto, and Altamaha river drainages. It is mostly found above the fall line in these drainages. It may also have been introduced to the Chattahoochee River system.

Habitats of this species include pools or edges of riffles in small streams, and near banks in eddy currents in larger streams and small rivers, usually over sand or gravel bottoms. The rosyface chub avoids areas with heavy siltation. It spawns in moderately fast riffles over clean gravel.

== Human interest ==
=== Aquarium ===
Rosyface chubs make good aquarium fish as they are quite hardy and sociable. They appreciate being among other minnows, and often school with yellowfin shiners. They are quick to reach for food once fed, and will eat frozen food, flakes, and even shrimp pellets.

== Conservation status ==
=== South Carolina ===
While the population of the species is currently considered stable, they are of concern because of their small range, only found in a few major drainages in the state. Conservation efforts in South Carolina have a great impact upon the species as half of global distributions of the species occur in the state.

Concerns for the species are similar to those of other fish in South Carolina: source pollution, deforestation, loss of riparian corridors, impoundment development, siltation resulting from poor land use practice, and poorly urban and suburban development.

== See also ==
- Bigeye chub
