= James Roscoe Day =

American academic administrator and minister

The Rev. James Roscoe Day
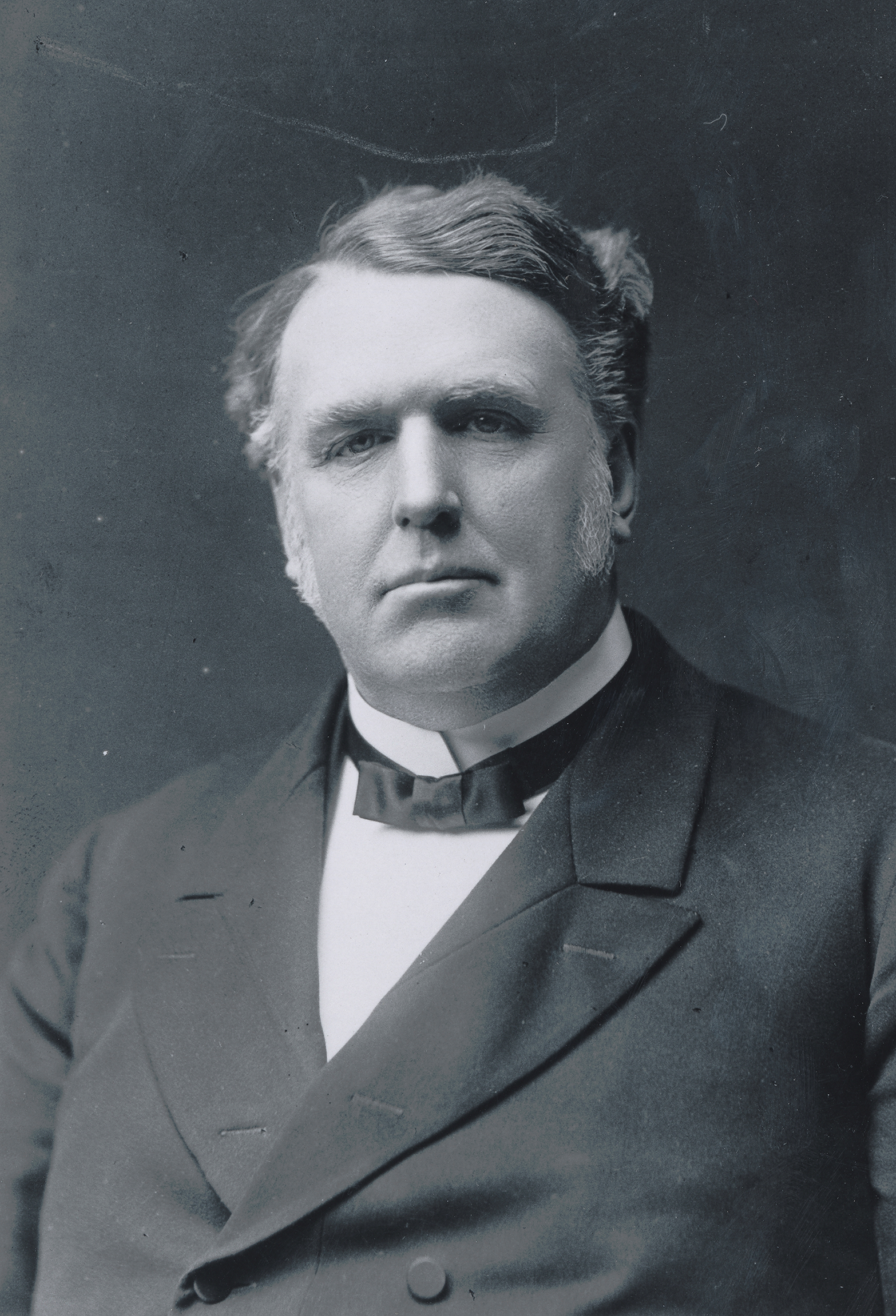
- Day c. 1910

4th Chancellor of Syracuse University
- In office April 1894 – 14 June 1922
- Preceded by: Charles N. Sims
- Succeeded by: Charles Wesley Flint

Personal details
- Born: October 17, 1845 Whitneyville, Maine
- Died: March 13, 1923 (aged 77) Atlantic City, New Jersey
- Education: Maine Wesleyan Seminary; Bowdoin College

The Rev. James Roscoe Day, D.D., L.L.D. (17 October 1845 – March 13, 1923) was an American Methodist minister, educator and chancellor of Syracuse University.

== Early life and education ==
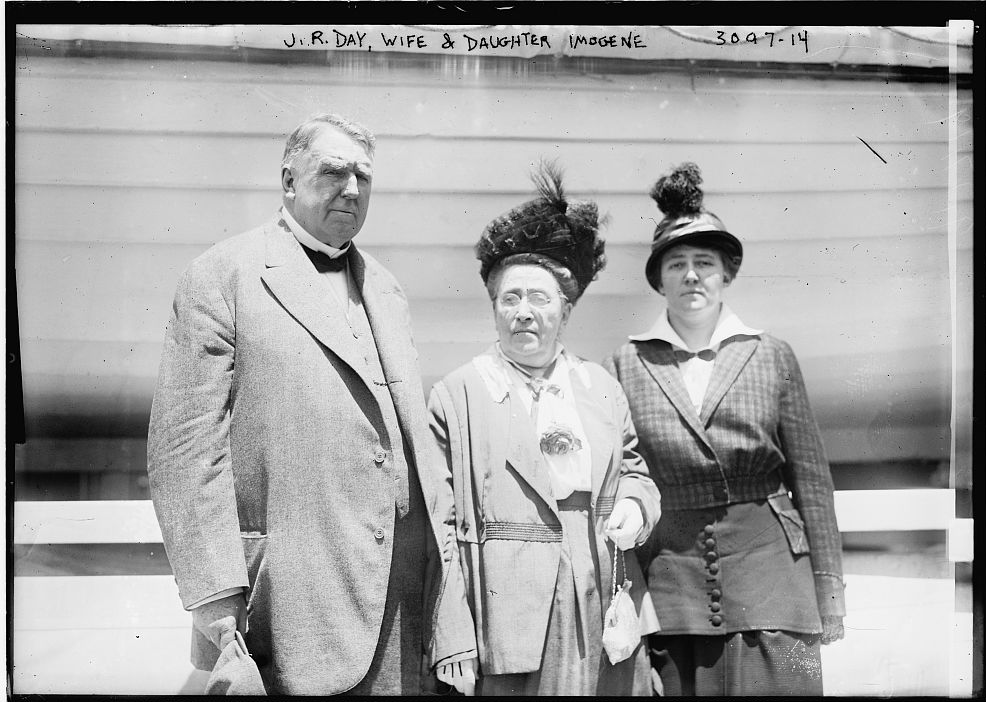
Day and family in 1914

Day was born in Whitneyville, Maine, on October 17, 1845 to Thomas and Mary Plummer Hillman Day. He attended Maine Wesleyan Seminary and then studied at Bowdoin College but had to stop due to poor health; he eventually received his degree in 1874. He married Anna E. Richards of Auburn, Maine in 1873. In 1872, he was ordained a minister of the Methodist Episcopal Church and served as a pastor at Bath, Maine, from 1872 to 1874; Portland, Maine, from 1876 to 1878; Boston, Massachusetts, from 1881 to 1882; New York City, 1883 to 1885 and 1889 to 1893. His last pastoral position was at Calvary Methodist in Harlem, 1893. He was known for having a strong, forceful speaking style.

== Syracuse University ==
Day was elected as the fourth chancellor of Syracuse University on Nov. 16, 1893 to succeed Charles N. Sims. He was elected bishop in 1904, but declined the post to stay at Syracuse.

Day is credited with helping to greatly expand the University as several important buildings were constructed during his tenure including the Archbold Gymnasium, Bowne Hall, Carnegie Library, Goldstein Faculty Center, Lyman Hall, Machinery Hall, Slocum Hall, Sims Hall, Smith Hall, Steel Hall and the Tolley Administration Building.

He retired from the presidency on July 14, 1922. To date, Day was the longest-serving chancellor of the University. Day Hall, a first year residence hall housing roughly 540 students, is named after him.

== Writing ==
Day was an author and wrote The Raid on Prosperity (1907) and My Neighbor the Workingman.

== Death ==
Day died in Atlantic City, New Jersey, on March 13, 1923.

== See also ==
- List of chancellors of Syracuse University
- List of Syracuse University buildings
- Archbold Stadium
- John Dustin Archbold

Academic offices
Preceded by Charles N. Sims	Chancellor of Syracuse University; 1893–1922	Succeeded by Charles Wesley Flint
