= John E. Corbally =

American academic administrator (1924–2004)

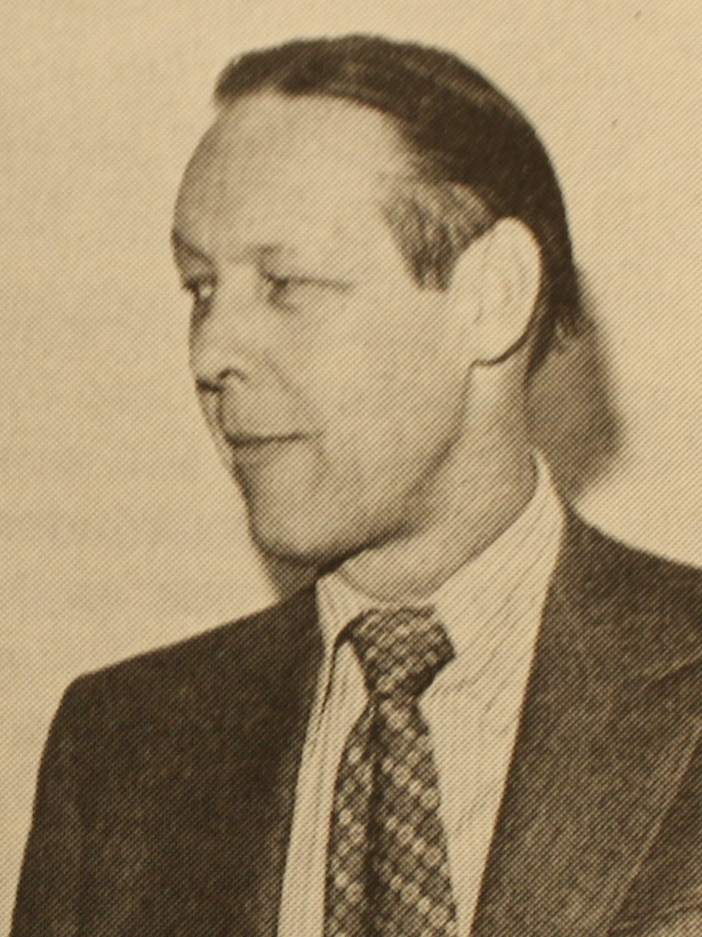
- Corbally in 1974

1st President of John D. and Catherine T. MacArthur Foundation
- In office 1979–1989
- Preceded by: Office established
- Succeeded by: Adele S. Simmons

13th President of the University of Illinois system
- In office 1971–1979
- Preceded by: David D. Henry
- Succeeded by: Stanley O. Ikenberry

8th Chancellor and President of Syracuse University
- In office September 1969 – March 1971
- Preceded by: William Pearson Tolley
- Succeeded by: Melvin A. Eggers

Personal details
- Born: October 14, 1924 South Bend, Washington, U.S.
- Died: July 23, 2004 (aged 79) Mill Creek, Washington, U.S.
- Spouse: Marguerite Walker (m. 1946)
- Children: 2
- Education: University of Washington (BA, MA); University of California, Berkeley (PhD)

Military service
- Branch/service: United States Navy
- Years of service: 1943–1946
- Rank: Lieutenant junior grade
- Battles/wars: Pacific Ocean theater
- Awards: Purple Heart

John Edward Corbally Jr. (October 14, 1924 – July 23, 2004) was an American academic administrator and university president. Corbally led Syracuse University from 1969 to 1971 before becoming president of the University of Illinois system from 1971 to 1979. He held roles in numerous non-profit organizations, including a decade as the first president of the John D. and Catherine T. MacArthur Foundation.

== Early life ==
Corbally was born in South Bend, Washington, on October 14, 1924, to John E. Corbally Sr., a University of Washington education professor, and Grace (née Williams) Corbally.

During World War II, Corbally held the rank of lieutenant junior grade in the United States Navy. He saw battle in the Pacific Ocean theater and received a Purple Heart.

After the war, Corbally returned to school, where he met his wife Marguerite Walker; they married in 1946.

In 1947, with a bachelor's degree from the University of Washington, he took a job as a high school chemistry teacher in Tacoma. He pursued further education at the University of Washington, graduating with a master's degree in 1950. He earned a doctorate in 1955 from the University of California, Berkeley and put his degree in educational administration and finance to work by taking an associate professor position at Ohio State University, where he would eventually become provost and vice president of academic affairs, positions held until he accepted the chancellor position at Syracuse University in 1969.

== University president ==
=== Syracuse University ===
Corbally replaced William Pearson Tolley as chancellor at Syracuse and reorganized the school's administration structure to match what he had experienced at Ohio, adding a provost and multiple vice president positions as opposed to the single vice chancellor position that the university had before.

During his short time as chancellor, Corbally faced crises spurred on by civil unrest surrounding the Vietnam War and race relations. Tolley, his predecessor, was a proponent of military education on campus; this included the establishment of a Reserve Officers' Training Corps (ROTC) program. By the time Tolley left office, the university faced major financial issues and there was uncertainty regarding the future of the ROTC program. Corbally advocated for keeping the program and its academic accreditation, an idea which was opposed by students hostile to a military presence on campus, some of whom participated in a sit-in of the ROTC building in February 1970. The matter was referred to the school senate, a democratic body composed of students, faculty, and administrators, which voted to keep the program open, a move which many students felt was forced by the chancellor.

Later that same year, on May 4, the shooting of four students at Kent State protesting against the United States' invasion of Cambodia led directly to the student strike of 1970, a nationwide protest by students on college campuses against US involvement in Vietnam, including at Syracuse. Early protests on campus led to firebombing and window-breaking, but Corbally's decision to cancel classes and allow the students to protest without police or administration interference arguably resulted in more moderate protests than at other colleges.

The peace was short lived, however, as in August 1970, eight black players on the Syracuse Orange football team did not show up for preseason practice, citing systemic racism in the program and discrimination by coach Ben Schwartzwalder. The move was a continuation of a boycott of spring practice by the players, and they were automatically suspended as a result. A university report released in December of that year declared that there was a chronic problem of racism in the Syracuse athletics programs, though in some cases the discrimination was unintentional. In response, Corbally reinstated the players and approved the creation of the Athletic Policy Board to oversee athletics at the school. The board would include input from students and ensure that all students, regardless of race, were entitled to fair treatment.

In early 1971, Corbally was offered the presidency of the University of Illinois system, which he readily accepted. The board chair called the resignation, "quite unexpected". The suddenness of his resignation at Syracuse led to speculation that he had been pressured to leave due to the tense events of 1970 or that he wanted to jump ship from a school still facing financial difficulties.

However, John Robert Greene, in a 1998 book on the history of Syracuse, argues that none of that is true: Corbally handled the student protesters and football boycott admirably, despite criticism at the time from some alumni of the school, and he, along with his vice chancellor Ronald Brady, had improved the financial status of the school much in the two years since Corbally took office. According to Greene, the chancellor took the new job "simply because he received a better job offer". Corbally was succeeded by his provost Melvin A. Eggers.

Corbally is the only Syracuse chancellor to not have a campus building named after them after finishing term.

=== University of Illinois ===
At Illinois, Corbally replaced David D. Henry, who stated he was stepping down in favor of a younger president with fresh ideas. Almost immediately, Corbally sought to raise capital to fund construction and programs at what was then the ninth-largest university system in the country, especially focusing on the Chicago campus and the school's veterinary medicine and agriculture programs. Corbally enlisted the help of alumni from these programs to raise money for two new buildings on the Urbana-Champaign campus.

In 1976–1977, Corbally sought to preserve funding to University of Illinois at a time when Governor Dan Walker was seeking cuts to state university budgets. Continued funding was secured from the state legislature in 1977 by way of a campaign by current and former students of the school organized by Corbally.

== MacArthur Foundation ==
Corbally was elected to the board of directors of the Chicago-based MacArthur Foundation in 1979. He later resigned his position at the University of Illinois to become the first president of the foundation, serving from 1979 to 1989, after which he remained on the board of directors, and as chairman of the board from 1995 to 2002. He is credited with starting the MacArthur Fellows Program, as well as guiding the foundation through its legal troubles of the late 1970s and early 1980s, when J. Roderick MacArthur – son of founder John D. MacArthur – sued several board members over alleged mismanagement of foundation funds.

== Personal life ==
Corbally was a Presbyterian and the first of that denomination to become chancellor of Syracuse, a historically Methodist university. After his time at the MacArthur Foundation, Corbally retired to his home state of Washington, where he served as a board member for various Seattle-area organizations, including the Rural Development Institute, now known as Landesa. He died on July 23, 2004, from brain cancer, aged 79, at his home in Mill Creek, Washington.

== Publications ==
- Sergiovanni, Thomas J.; Corbally, John E. (1984). Leadership and Organizational Culture: New Perspectives on Administrative Theory and Practice. University of Illinois Press. ISBN 0-252-01052-3.
- Corbally, John E. (1962). School finance. Boston: Allyn & Bacon. OCLC 2205979.
- Corbally, John E.; Jenson, T.J.; Staub, W. Frederick (1961). Educational administration: the secondary school. Boston: Allyn & Bacon. OCLC 187422.
- Campbell, Roald F.; Corbally, John E.; Ramseyer, John A. (1958). Introduction to educational administration. Boston: Allyn & Bacon. OCLC 989460.

== Notes and references ==
=== References ===
- Galvin, Edward L.; Mason, Margaret A.; O'Brien, Mary M. (2013). Syracuse University. Arcadia Publishing. ISBN 978-0-7385-9931-1.
- Greene, John R.; Greene, Robert A. (1998). Syracuse University: The Eggers Years. Syracuse University Press. ISBN 978-0-8156-0549-2.

Academic offices
Preceded by William P. Tolley	Chancellor of Syracuse University; 1969–1971	Succeeded by Melvin A. Eggers
Preceded by David D. Henry	President of the University of Illinois system 1971–1979	Succeeded by Stanley O. Ikenberry
Non-profit organization positions
First	President of the MacArthur Foundation; 1979–1989	Succeeded by Adele Simmons
