= Syracuse University Press =

American university press

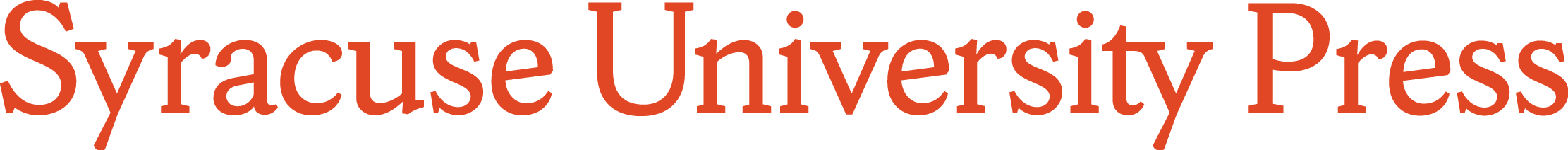
- Parent company: Syracuse University
- Founded: August 1943; 82 years ago
- Founder: William P. Tolley, Thomas J. Watson
- Country of origin: United States
- Headquarters location: Syracuse, New York
- Distribution: Longleaf Services (US); Eurospan Group (EMEA); Scholarly Book Services (Canada)
- Key people: Scott Warren (Interim Director)
- Publication types: Books, Audiobooks
- Official website: press.syr.edu

Syracuse University Press, founded in 1943, is a university press that is part of Syracuse University. It is a member of the Association of University Presses.

== History ==
SUP was formed in August 1943 when president William P. Tolley promised Thomas J. Watson that the university will organize a press to print IBM's Precision Measurements in the Metal Workings Industry. Matthew Lyle Spencer of the School of Journalism became the first chair of the board of directors and Lawrence Siegfried was the first editor.

== About ==
The areas of focus for the Press include Middle East studies, Native American studies, peace and conflict resolution, Irish studies and Jewish studies, New York State, television and popular culture, sports and entertainment. The Press has an international reputation in Irish studies and Middle East studies.

The Press has never owned its own printing press, and books are printed by an offsite manufacturer.

In March 2017, SU Press received Humanities Open Book Program award from the National Endowment for the Humanities.

Since October 2020, SU press has produced audiobooks in collaboration with Sound Beat, which is produced at Belfer Audio Laboratory and Archive at Syracuse University Libraries.

== See also ==
- List of English-language book publishing companies
- List of university presses
