= Charles Flint =

Charles Flint may refer to:

- Charles L. Flint (1824–1889), president of the University of Massachusetts
- Charles Ranlett Flint (1850–1934), American businessman, founder of a company which later became IBM
- Charles Wesley Flint, American bishop in the Methodist Church
