= John Robert Greene =

American historian (born 1955)

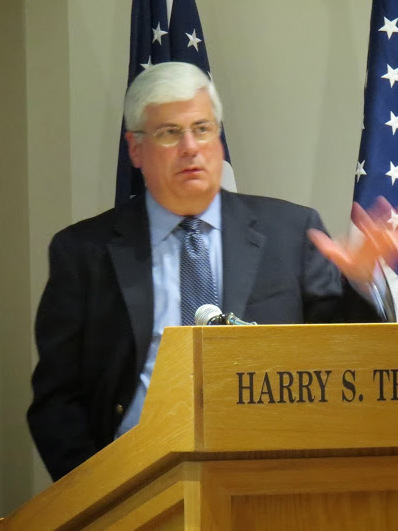
- Greene speaking at the Harry S. Truman Library, 2014
- Born: April 13, 1955 (age 71); Syracuse, New York
- Occupations: College Professor (Emeritus) and Writer
- Title: Professor Emeritus, Cazenovia College

Academic background
- Education: Christian Brothers Academy St. Bonaventure University Syracuse University

John Robert Greene is an American historian and writer who was the Paul J. Schupf Professor, History and Humanities, the director of the History Program, co-director of the History/Social Science major, and the College Archivist at Cazenovia College in Cazenovia, New York. Greene specializes in American history, with research and writing interests in the American presidency. He has edited or written twenty-one books, including works on Harry Truman, Dwight D. Eisenhower, Richard Nixon, Gerald Ford, George H. W. Bush, and George W. Bush. He has also written several volumes on the history of higher education.

== Personal life and education ==
Greene was born in Syracuse, New York on April 13, 1955. He is the son of John C. Greene and Margaret (Tozer) Greene. Greene attended Syracuse public schools until 1968 when he entered Christian Brothers Academy (CBA), a private high school in Syracuse, from where he graduated in 1973. That year, he entered St. Bonaventure University, initially majoring in history with a pre-law minor.

In 1975 Greene changed his focus to secondary education, and in 1977 he received his Bachelor of Arts in history, with a New York State teaching certification in Social Studies (7-12). In 1978 Greene received his Master of Arts in history from St. Bonaventure. While at St. Bonaventure, Greene was a disc jockey for the campus radio stations, WOFM-AM, and WSBU-FM, and served on the station's board of directors. In 1978 Greene entered the Ph.D. program in American History at Syracuse University's Maxwell School of Citizenship and Public Affairs. He completed his doctorate under the advisership of David H. Bennett in October 1983; his dissertation explored "The Presidential Election of 1952."

Greene lives in Chittenango, New York. He is married and has three children.

== Professional career ==
Greene taught at Cazenovia College in Cazenovia, New York. He was originally hired in September 1979 as a part-time instructor, serving as station manager of the campus radio station, WITC (FM) until 1985, and teaching an assortment of classes, largely multi-sections of Effective Speaking. In May 1984, he received a full-time appointment to the faculty, and in December 1987, he was tenured to the college. In 1993 he was named Distinguished Faculty Member, and in February 2000, he was named to Cazenovia College's first endowed chair, the Paul J. Schupf Chair in History and Humanities. He taught courses in history and research methodology. In 2022 he received the college's Distinguished Service Award. Greene retired from full time teaching in January 2023 with the rank of Professor Emeritus.

Greene has appeared on many media outlets, including C-SPAN, MSNBC, USA Today, and PBS. For seventeen years, he was a regular on The Ivory Tower, a program on WCNY-TV, Syracuse, New York. He has also appeared on such podcasts as The American Idea, This American President, and Presidencies of the United States.

== Awards and honors ==
- Alpha Sigma Lambda (National Honor, Continuing Education)
- Delta Epsilon Sigma (National Honor Society)
- Phi Alpha Theta (History)
- Pi Delta Epsilon (Journalism)
- Who's Who in American Colleges and Universities; in American Education; in the East; Among Teachers
- Distinguished Alumni Award, Christian Brothers Academy (2026)

== Books and other publications ==
Greene has written or edited 21 books, and authored over 100 articles and reviews. His The Presidency of Bill Clinton is forthcoming.

=== Original works ===
- Little Helpers: Harry Vaughan, His Cronies, and Corruption in the Truman Administration (2024)
- The Presidency of George W. Bush (2021)
- I Like Ike: The Presidential Election of 1952 (Univ. Press of Kansas, 2017)
- The Presidency of George H. W. Bush (2nd. ed., revised; 2015)
- America in the 1960s (2010)
- Betty Ford: Candor and Courage in the White House (2004)
- The Hill: An Illustrated Biography of Syracuse University (2000)
- Generations of Excellence: An Illustrated Biography of Cazenovia College (2000)
- The Presidency of George Bush (2000)
- Syracuse University: The Eggers Years (1998)
- Syracuse University: The Tolley Years (1996)
- The Presidency of Gerald R. Ford (1995)
- The Limits of Power: The Nixon and Ford Administrations (1993)
- The Crusade: The Presidential Election of 1952 (1985)

=== Edited works ===
- Presidential Profiles: The George W. Bush Years (2011)
- Richard M. Nixon: A Bibliography. (2006)
- Presidential Profiles: The Nixon and Ford Years (2006)
- Presidential Profiles: The George H. W. Bush Years (2006)
- Gerald R. Ford: A Bibliography (1994)
- The Speech: A Guide to Effective Speaking (1993)
- The Quest: A Guide to the Job Interview (1991)
