= Clear chub =

Conservation status
- Least Concern (IUCN 3.1)

Scientific classification
- Kingdom: Animalia
- Phylum: Chordata
- Class: Actinopterygii
- Order: Cypriniformes
- Family: Leuciscidae
- Subfamily: Pogonichthyinae
- Genus: Hybopsis
- Species: H. winchelli

Binomial name
- Hybopsis winchelli Girard, 1856

Synonyms
- Notropis winchelli (Girard, 1856)>

Species of fish

The clear chub (Hybopsis winchelli) is a species of freshwater ray-finned fish belonging to the family Leuciscidae, the shiners, daces and minnows. This species is found in the United States.

== Description ==
Hybopsis winchelli is a species of freshwater fish with terminal maxillary barbels at exist in various degrees of development. Some populations have well-developed barbels while others have rudimentary barbels. Other populations have barbels that are nonexistent.

Just as the barbel development is variable, so is the pigmentation of the fish. Most populations exhibit a dark band that runs laterally along the sides, opercle, snout and causal base of the fish. In most populations, the pigmentation intensifies at the causal base that forms an ill-defined, continuous causal spot. There may also be a predorsal stripe and a small dark spot on the dorsal fin. The scales themselves have a pigment concentration along the edges of the scales so that they give the fish a cross-hatched appearance. The sides below the lateral line are white, and the only melanophores are scattered along the base of the anal fin.

The head of the fish is flat with a rounded conic snout that overhangs a small, central mouth. The eyes are relatively large, and the scales are relatively large and uniform all over the body of the fish.

The lateral line is straight and completely pored with about 39–42 scales.

The largest specimens measure about 70 millimetres (2.8 in) in length.

== Habitat ==
The habitat of the clear chub includes creeks and rivers ranging from small to medium sizes. The clear chub usually prefers sand-silt bottoms, or pools adjacent to riffle areas.

== Reproduction and life cycle ==
Spawning usually occurs between the months of February to March in water temperatures of 10–17 °C (50–63 °F). The larvae usually remain in shallow water, which is generally less than 1 metre (3.3 ft) deep that only moves at a rate of 1.8–4.0 centimetres per second (0.71–1.57 in/s).

== Distribution ==
The range of the clear chub includes the eastern tributaries of the Mississippi River, southwestern Mississippi and Louisiana, and extends east along the Gulf Slope up to and including the Mobile drainage basin in Alabama and Georgia, as well as the Perdido River system east to the Apalachicola River basin, and Gulf of Mexico drainages from the Ocklockonee River in Florida, and Flint River in Georgia, to the Mississippi River in Mississippi.

== Etymology ==
The species name, winchelli, originates from Professor Alexander Winchell. He provided Dr. Girard with the specimens he needed to categorize the clear chub. Winchell acquired his specimens from the Black Warrior River, Alabama.

== See also ==
- Cyprinidae (General)
