= Brian D. O'Neill =

American author and attorney

Brian D. O'Neill is an American author and attorney, best known for Half a Wing, Three Engines and a Prayer, a book about the U.S. Eighth Air Force and B-17 crews and missions in World War II. He is also the author of 303rd Bombardment Group, about the same subject.

Born into a U.S. Air Force family in 1949, O'Neill's growing up years were spent on many Air Force bases throughout the United States, at a time when piston-engined aircraft a generation or two behind the B-17 were still in wide use. His Air Force upbringing fostered a lifelong interest in World War II aviation history. After graduating from the University of Maryland in 1971, O'Neill served with the U.S. Navy for three years, first as a destroyer gunnery officer and then as a shipyard repair officer at the Philadelphia Naval Shipyard. Upon leaving military service he became an attorney and the General Counsel of Curtiss-Wright Corporation, the aviation company that had manufactured the P-40 Warhawk fighter and the Cyclone B-17 engines during World War II. In 2001 O'Neill left corporate life to enter the private practice of law. As of 2013 he manages a very active immigration and employment law firm based in Morristown, New Jersey.

== Bibliography ==
- Half a Wing, Three Engines and a Prayer. McGraw-Hill Companies, 1999. ISBN .
- 303rd Bombardment Group. Osprey Publishing, 2003. ISBN 1-84176-537-6 and 9781841765372.
