= Lined chub =

Conservation status
- Least Concern (IUCN 3.1)

- Vulnerable (NatureServe)

Scientific classification
- Kingdom: Animalia
- Phylum: Chordata
- Class: Actinopterygii
- Order: Cypriniformes
- Family: Leuciscidae
- Subfamily: Pogonichthyinae
- Genus: Hybopsis
- Species: H. lineapunctata

Binomial name
- Hybopsis lineapunctata Clemmer & Suttkus, 1971

Synonyms
- Notropis lineapunctatus (Clemmer & Suttkus, 1971)

Species of fish

The lined chub (Hybopsis lineapunctata) is a species of freshwater ray-finned fish belonging to the family Leuciscidae, the shiners, daces and minnows. It is endemic to the United States of America where it occurs in the Coosa and Tallapoosa River systems in the states of Alabama, Georgia and Tennessee. It can be found in small to medium-sized streams which have pools and riffles over sand, gravel, or rubble beds; especially in gently flowing to quiet, clear water close to riffles and vegetation. It feeds on chironomid larvae and pupae, and larger aquatic insects It is threatened by canalisation of its native rivers and by siltation caused by logging.
