= William Pratt Graham =

American university president (1871–1962)

6th Chancellor of Syracuse University
- In office May 1937 – September 1942
- Preceded by: Charles Wesley Flint
- Succeeded by: William P. Tolley

Personal details
- Born: November 24, 1871
- Died: January 10, 1962 (aged 90)
- Spouse: Cora M. Dodson (m. 1899; died 1958)
- Education: Syracuse University

William Pratt Graham (November 24, 1871 – January 10, 1962) was an electrical engineering professor and the sixth chancellor of Syracuse University. Graham was the first alumnus of Syracuse as well as the first non-clergyman to hold that position.

== Biography ==
Graham was born to Jerome Bonaparte Graham, a veteran of the Civil War, and Sylvia Aurelia Graham in Oswego, New York. Graham entered Syracuse University as an undergraduate in 1889 and graduated in 1893 before pursuing postgraduate work at the University of Berlin, graduating with a Doctor of Philosophy in 1897. He joined the faculty of Syracuse as an electrical engineering professor in 1898, after spending the intervening period studying the subject at Technische Universität Darmstadt, and he was made dean of the College of Applied Science in 1912. Graham served as the vice-chancellor to Charles Wesley Flint before succeeding him as chancellor in 1937, a position Graham intended to hold only until a successor was found. Graham retired from the university in 1942 when William Pearson Tolley was elected chancellor. He died in Syracuse, New York in 1962.

== Bibliography ==
- "The Classics from the Standpoint of an Engineer". The Classical Weekly. 11 (13). Johns Hopkins University Press: 104. January 21, 1918. JSTOR 4387585.

Academic offices
Preceded by Charles Wesley Flint	Chancellor of Syracuse University; 1937–1942	Succeeded by William P. Tolley
