= Kent Syverud =

American legal scholar (born 1956)

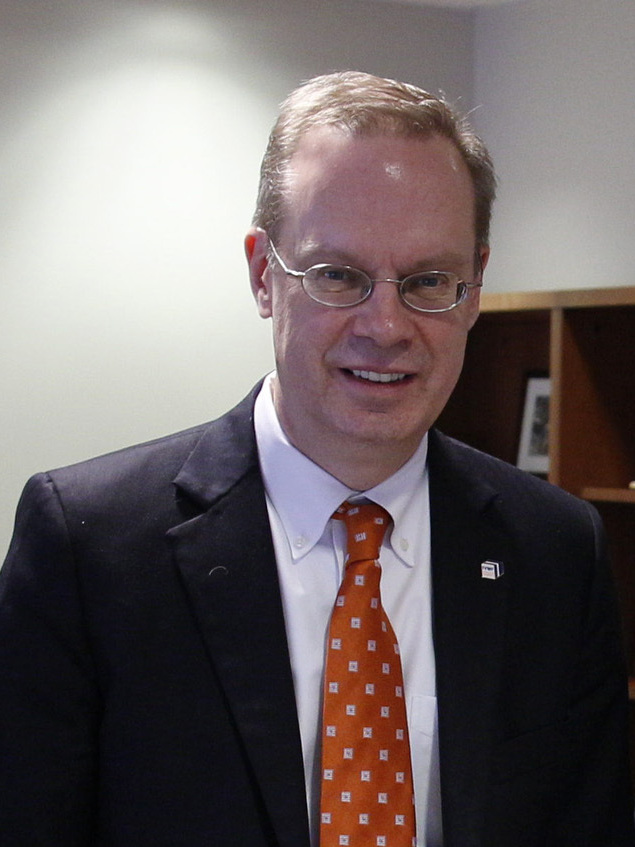
- Syverud in 2014

Chancellor of Syracuse University
- In office January 13, 2014 – April 15, 2026
- Preceded by: Nancy Cantor
- Succeeded by: Mike Haynie

Personal details
- Born: Kent Douglas Syverud; October 23, 1956 (age 69) Irondequoit, New York, U.S.
- Spouse: Ruth Chen (m. 1982)
- Education: Georgetown University (BS); University of Michigan (MA, JD)
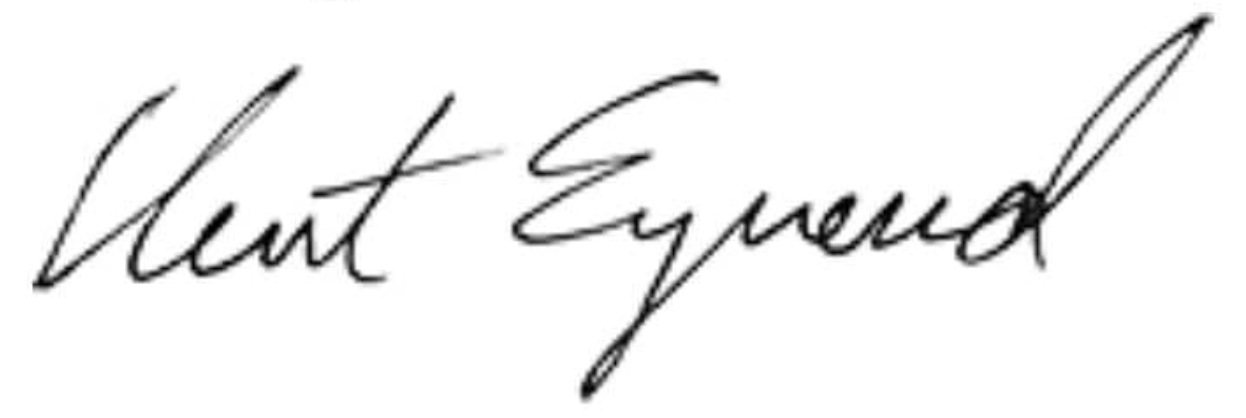
- Signature

Kent Douglas Syverud (SIV-er-rood; born October 23, 1956) is an American legal scholar.

He served as the 12th chancellor and president of Syracuse University from January 2014 to April 2026. He previously served as law school dean at Washington University in St. Louis in Missouri from 2005 to 2013, as law school dean at Vanderbilt University in Tennessee from 1997 to 2005, and as associate dean for academic affairs at the University of Michigan Law School from 1995 to 1997.

He was slated to step down as Syracuse chancellor in June 2026 and assume the role of the incoming 16th president of the University of Michigan on July 1, 2026. In April 2026, Syverud announced that he had been diagnosed with brain cancer and would not become the next University of Michigan president. Syverud instead joined the University of Michigan as a professor of law and special advisor to its Board of Regents.

== Education ==
Syverud graduated from the public Irondequoit High School in Rochester, New York, in June 1974.

Syverud received a Bachelor of Science in Foreign Service from Georgetown University in 1977. He received a Juris Doctor in 1981 and a Master of Arts in economics in 1983 from the University of Michigan. While a student at Michigan, he was a member of the Order of the Coif.

Syverud passed the bar examination of Washington, D.C. in 1982.

== Career ==
=== Court clerkship ===
After graduating from law school, Syverud clerked for United States District Judge Louis F. Oberdorfer of the United States District Court for the District of Columbia. Syverud's closest mentors include retired United States Supreme Court Justice Sandra Day O'Connor, for whom he worked as a clerk soon after she became the first woman appointed to the Supreme Court.

=== Teaching career and deanship ===
From 1987 to 1997, Syverud taught complex litigation, insurance law, and civil procedure at law schools at Vanderbilt University and at the University of Michigan. At the University of Michigan Law School, he received tenure in 1992 and served as the law school's associate dean for academic affairs from 1995 to 1997.

Syverud served as law school dean of Vanderbilt University from 1997 to 2005, where he was the Garner Anthony Professor of Law. Under Syverud, the law school underwent a US$24 million facility expansion that more than doubled its size and the number of faculty grew from 33 to 47 members.

Syverud served as law school dean of Washington University in St. Louis from 2005 to 2013, where he was also appointed the Ethan A. H. Shepley Distinguished University Professor in 2005.

=== Syracuse University ===
On September 12, 2013, Syverud was named the 12th chancellor and president of Syracuse University, succeeding Nancy Cantor. He took office as chancellor on January 13, 2014, and was inaugurated on April 11, 2014.

Syverud stabilized finances by erasing US$440 million inherited debt, completing a $1.5 billion fundraising campaign and doubling the endowment to above $2 billion. He oversaw the $120 million renovation of the Carrier Dome, transformed the campus with a $500 million growth spurt with addition of three new dormitories on campus and converting apartment buildings and hotels into dorms. Prior to his tenure, only one new dorm had been built on campus in the previous 50 years. Syverud oversaw the growth of Institute for Veterans and Military Families, located in the National Veterans Resource Center, which enrolls about 24,000 military members and their families in non-degree programs. He played a critical role in luring the Micron Technology's $100 billion chip factory project to the area, by growing its engineering school by investing $100 million over the five years, which included $20 million to develop a Center for Advanced Semiconductor Manufacturing. In 2024, Syverud received the TIAA Institute's Hesburgh Award for leadership excellence.

On August 26, 2025, Syverud announced that he would step down from the chancellorship and presidency after his twelve-year service, effective June 2026.

=== University of Michigan ===
On January 12, 2026, the Regents of the University of Michigan named Syverud the incoming 16th president of the University of Michigan, slated to succeed interim president Domenico Grasso effective July 1, 2026. In April 2026, Syverud announced that he had been diagnosed with brain cancer and would not become the next University of Michigan president. Syverud instead joined the University of Michigan as a professor of law and special advisor to its Board of Regents.

== Social engagement ==
Syverud was listed twice among donors who contributed between US$5,000 and US$9,999 to the University of Michigan, in June 2008 and again in September 2015.

Syverud formerly served as co-chair of the Central New York Regional Economic Development Council, part of a statewide network created by New York Governor Andrew Cuomo to help spur economic growth throughout the state. Under his leadership, plan submitted by central New York council was selected for an Upstate Revitalization Initiative grant of $500 million.

He formerly served as one of two independent trustees of the Deepwater Horizon Oil Spill Trust, a $20 billion fund to pay claims arising from the 2010 BP oil spill in the Gulf of Mexico. In 2016, he completed six years of service as one of the two trustees of the $20 billion Deepwater Horizon Oil Spill Trust. Syverud currently serves as the chair of the Atlantic Coast Conference Board of Directors.

== Personal life ==
Syverud married Ruth Chi-Fen Chen in 1982, and they have three children.

Ruth Chen graduated from the University of Michigan with a Doctor of Philosophy in toxicology in 1984 and a Master of Public Health, as well as receiving a Master of Science in biomedical sciences from the University of Texas Health Science Center at Houston. Her doctoral dissertation was in environmental toxicology, titled In Vitro Metabolism of 1,1-Dichloroethylene by Rat Hepatic Mitochondria and Microsomes (Cytochrome P-450, Chlorinated Hydrocarbon, Hepatotoxicity). Her doctoral mentor was Rory Clement Bards Conolly.

== See also ==
- List of law clerks for the eighth seat of the Supreme Court of the United States

Academic offices
Preceded by Nancy Cantor	Chancellor of Syracuse University; 2014–present	Incumbent
