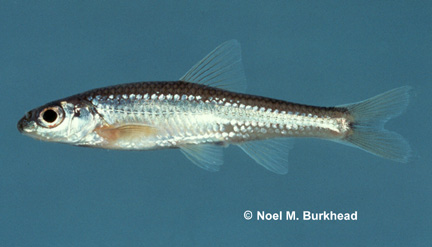
- Bigeye chub (Hybopsis amblops)

Scientific classification
- Kingdom: Animalia
- Phylum: Chordata
- Class: Actinopterygii
- Order: Cypriniformes
- Family: Leuciscidae
- Subfamily: Pogonichthyinae
- Genus: Hybopsis; Agassiz, 1854

Type species
- Hybopsis gracilis Agassiz, 1854

= Hybopsis =

Genus of fishes

Hybopsis is a genus of freshwater ray-finned fishes belonging to the family Leuciscidae, the shiners, daces and minnows. This fishes in this genus are found in North America.

== Species ==
Hybopsis contains the following species:

- Hybopsis amblops (Rafinesque, 1820) (Bigeye chub)
- Hybopsis amnis (C. L. Hubbs & Greene, 1951) (Pallid shiner)
- Hybopsis hypsinotus (Cope, 1870) (Highback chub)
- Hybopsis lineapunctata Clemmer & Suttkus, 1971 (Lined chub)
- Hybopsis rubrifrons (D. S. Jordan, 1877) (Rosyface chub)
- Hybopsis winchelli Girard, 1856 (Clear chub)
