= Daniel A. D'Aniello =

American businessman

- Born: September 14, 1946 (age 79); Butler, Pennsylvania, US
- Education: Syracuse University; Harvard University
- Occupation: Businessman
- Title: Chairman, the Carlyle Group
- Spouse: Gayle D'Aniello
- Children: 2

Daniel Anthony D'Aniello (born September 14, 1946) is an American businessman. He is the cofounder and chairman of the Carlyle Group, a private equity firm headquartered in Washington, D.C.

== Biography ==
=== Early life ===
D'Aniello grew up in an Italian-American family in Butler, Pennsylvania, and graduated from Butler Senior High School. He graduated from Syracuse University magna cum laude in 1968, where he was a member of Beta Gamma Sigma, an honor society for business students and scholars. He received an MBA from the Harvard Business School in 1974, where he was a Teagle Foundation Fellow.

=== Career ===
Following his graduation from Syracuse University, he enlisted in the United States Navy where he served as a supply officer aboard the USS Wasp (CVS18) until 1971. He was a financial officer at PepsiCo and TWA. He was later vice president for finance and development at the Marriott Corporation. He was responsible for the valuation of major mergers, acquisitions, divestitures, debt and equity offerings, and project financings.

In 1987, he co-founded the Carlyle Group with William E. Conway Jr., and David Rubenstein. He now serves as chairman of the board.

He is on the board of trustees of the American Enterprise Institute, and on the board of trustees of his alma mater, Syracuse University, and on the corporate advisory council of its Martin J. Whitman School of Management and the IVMF advisory board.

In July 2017, D'Aniello was awarded the Arents Award, Syracuse University's highest alumni honor, and an honorary doctorate in 2021.

=== Philanthropy ===
Daniel and Gayle D'Aniello have donated over $50 million to Syracuse University in support of the construction and endowment of the Daniel and Gayle D’Aniello Building, the National Veterans Resource Center (NVRC), and the Institute for Veterans and Military Families.

=== Personal life ===
He lives in Vienna, Virginia with his wife, Gayle. Together they have two daughters.
