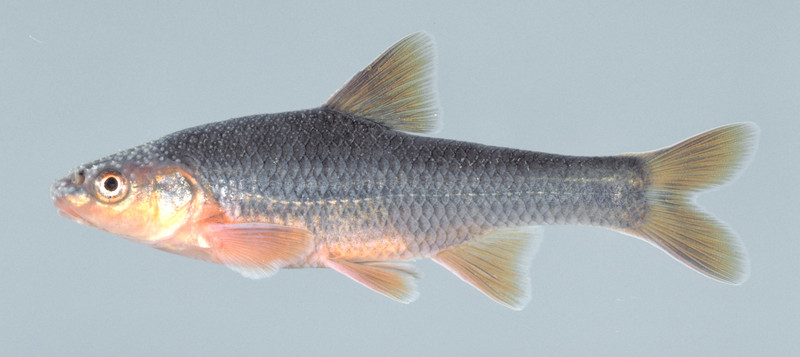

Conservation status
- Least Concern (IUCN 3.1)

Scientific classification
- Kingdom: Animalia
- Phylum: Chordata
- Class: Actinopterygii
- Division: Teleostei
- Order: Cypriniformes
- Family: Leuciscidae
- Subfamily: Pogonichthyinae
- Genus: Hybopsis
- Species: H. hypsinotus

Binomial name
- Hybopsis hypsinotus (Cope, 1870)

Synonyms
- Ceratichthys hypsinotus Cope, 1870; Notropis hypsinotus (Cope, 1870)

= Highback chub =

Species of fish

Highback chub (Hybopsis hypsinotus) s a species of freshwater ray-finned fish belonging to the family Leuciscidae, the shiners, daces and minnows. This species is found in the Eastern United States.

== Geographic distribution ==
This species can be found in the foothills of the Blue Ridge Mountains above the Fall Line, as well as in portions of the Peedee and Santee river drainages in the Piedmont region.

== Ecology ==
The highback chub is a freshwater fish of the United States. It can be found in clear to turbid water in creeks and small to medium rivers with sandy or rocky bottoms. It appears to spawn on the nests of the bluehead chub (Nocomis leptocephalus).
