= Mike Haynie =

Chancellor and President of Syracuse University

- Haynie in 2026

Chancellor of Syracuse University
- Incumbent
- Assumed office April 15, 2026
- Preceded by: Kent Syverud

Personal details
- Born: James Michael Haynie Jr. July 12, 1969 (age 57) Philadelphia, Pennsylvania, U.S.
- Spouse: Kevin Clark (m. 1998)
- Education: University of Delaware (BA); University of Oregon (MBA); University of Colorado Boulder (PhD)

James Michael Haynie Jr. is an American academic serving as the 13th chancellor of Syracuse University. A faculty member at Syracuse since 2006, he most recently served as the vice chancellor for strategic initiatives and innovation and executive dean of the Martin J. Whitman School of Management at Syracuse.

== Early life and education ==
Haynie grew up in North Wales, a suburb of Philadelphia. He attended the North Penn High School, competing in cross country and track and field.

He studied political science at the University of Delaware, where he joined the ROTC, and worked his way up to cadet wing commander by his senior year. He received his B.A.A.S. degree in 1992. While working in the Air Force, Haynie continued his education, earning an MBA at the University of Oregon in 2000. He earned a PhD in entrepreneurship and metacognition at the University of Colorado Boulder in 2005, where his PhD work was advised by Dean A. Shepherd. His dissertation explored role of cognitive adaptability in entrepreneurial decisions.

== Career ==
=== Air Force ===
Haynie joined the United States Air Force after graduation and served for 14 years as an officer. He served as an aide-de-camp to four-star general George T. Babbitt Jr.

He also served as a professor of management at the Air Force Academy in Colorado Springs.

=== Syracuse University as a faculty ===
Haynie arrived at Syracuse in 2006 as an assistant professor of entrepreneurship in the Martin J. Whitman School of Management.

In 2007, he established The Entrepreneurship Bootcamp for Veterans with Disabilities (EBV), which began with a first class of 17 vets. In June 2011, Haynie and then chancellor Nancy Cantor launched the Institute for Veterans and Military Families to bring together several pre-existing veterans related institutes at the university. Haynie was named the Executive Director of the IVMF as well as named the Steven W. Barnes Professor of Entrepreneurship. Under Haynie, the IVMF grew from a small team to more than 100 employees and had a budget of $22 million in 2025 and more than 300,000 vets and family members have been served by the institute’s training.

Haynie was featured on 60 Minutes in 2013 in a segment titled Succeeding As Civilians. He routinely published research reports on veteran related issues and has testified before US Senate and House committees on Veterans Affairs.

In May 2014, Haynie was named the as vice chancellor for strategic initiatives and innovation at Syracuse University.

In 2018, he was named university professor, which is the highest academic rank conferred to faculty at Syracuse.

In 2025, he launched the Center for the Creator Economy in collaboration with the Newhouse School.

=== Syracuse University as Chancellor ===
On March 3, 2026, Haynie was named the 13th Chancellor and President of Syracuse University, effective April 15, 2026. He succeeded Kent Syverud, who was tapped for the top job at University of Michigan, but could no longer serve as president due to a brain cancer diagnosis.

== Recognition ==
Haynie was named the Onondaga County veteran of 2015.

Haynie and the IVMF were honored with American Legion's Prestigious Patriot Award in 2021.

== Personal life ==
Haynie is Syracuse University's first openly gay chancellor and lives in an 11-acre lakefront home on Cazenovia Lake with his partner, Kevin Clark, their golden retrievers, Ollie & Daisy, their chickens and a tractor. Haynie has mentioned that he does not plan to live in the Syracuse University's traditional chancellor's mansion on campus, as that space would be better utilized as an event space.

Academic offices
Preceded by Kent Syverud	Chancellor of Syracuse University; 2026–present	Incumbent
