= Carole LaBonne =

Developmental and Stem Cell Biologist

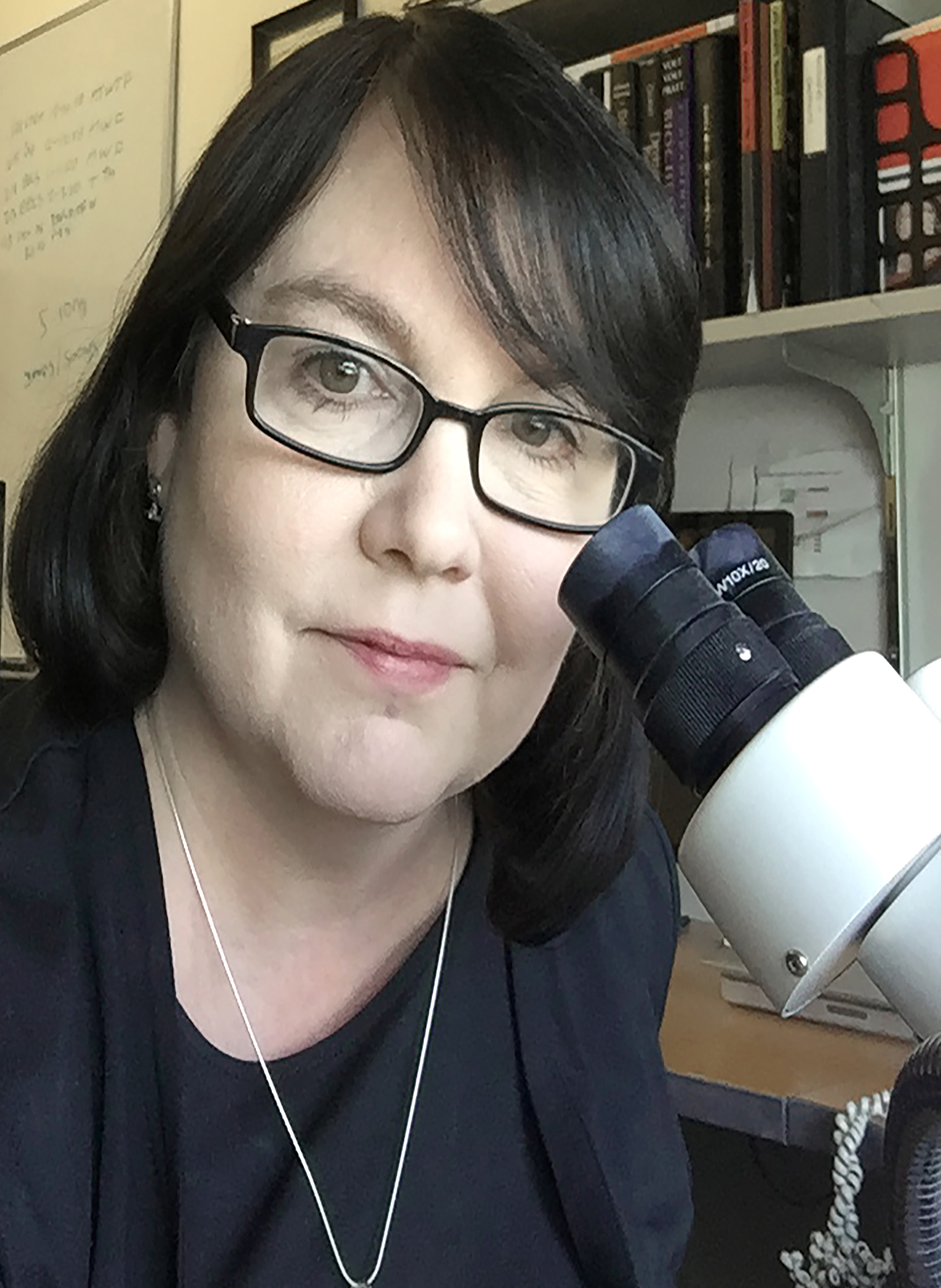
- Education: University of Rochester; Harvard University
- Scientific career
- Fields: Developmental and Stem Cell Biology
- Workplaces: California Institute of Technology; Northwestern University
- Website: https://sites.northwestern.edu/labonnelab/

Carole LaBonne is a Developmental and Stem Cell Biologist at Northwestern University. She is the Erastus Otis Haven Professor of Molecular Biosciences and a past president of the Society for Developmental Biology.

== Education and early career ==
LaBonne received her bachelor's degree from the University of Rochester, doing research with Sayeeda Zain on the molecular basis of Alzheimer's disease. Inspired by the work of famed embryologist and Rochester emeritus professor Johannes Holtfreter, LaBonne pursued doctoral work at Harvard University studying germ layer formation using Xenopus as a model. As a National Science Foundation pre-doctoral Fellow working with Malcolm Whitman, LaBonne characterized the role of FGF signaling in formation of the mesendoderm. During her doctoral study, LaBonne discovered that activin-mediated mesoderm induction required FGF signaling and elucidated the role of RAS-Map Kinase signaling in this process.

Following her graduate work, LaBonne pursued post-doctoral work at the California Institute of Technology as an American Cancer Society Fellow working with Marianne Bronner on the molecular mechanisms underlying the early development of neural crest cells. She showed that formation of neural crest cells, a stem cell population unique to vertebrates, required both attenuation of endogenous BMP signaling and active Wnt signaling, and further showed that up regulation of the zinc-finger transcriptional repressor SNAI2 could bypass the need for BMP inhibition. In subsequent work she demonstrated that Snail-family proteins are required for both establishing the neural crest stem cell state and for the migratory and invasive behavior of neural crest cells, a role these factors also play in metastasizing tumor cells.

== Research and career ==
LaBonne started her independent laboratory at Northwestern University in 2001 in the department of Molecular Biosciences (formerly Biochemistry, Molecular Biology and Cell Biology). She became a tenured associate professor in 2007, and a full professor in 2012. She was appointed the Erastus O. Haven Professor of Life Sciences in 2017. LaBonne has served as co-leader of the Tumor Environment and Metastasis Program in Northwestern's Robert H. Lurie Comprehensive Cancer Center since 2005. She served as director of Northwestern's Interdisciplinary Biological Sciences PhD program from 2009 to 2017. She has served as co-director of the NCI funded Oncogenesis and Developmental Biology Training Program, and Director of Northwestern's training cluster in Developmental, Systems and Stem Cell Biology. She served as Chair of the Department of Molecular Biosciences from 2017-2023. LaBonne served as the co-director of the Embryology course at the Marine Biological Laboratory from 2020-2023. She served as president of the Society for Developmental Biology from 2024 to 2025.

Research in the LaBonne laboratory was the first to link Myc to the acquisition of stem cell attributes, and demonstrated that Myc plays a central role in neural crest ontogeny, several years prior to the initial report of the Yamanaka factors. This work proposed that Myc plays this key role in many stem cell populations, and more recent work by others has shown this to be the case. LaBonne's group subsequently demonstrated that Id3 was a key Myc target in maintaining neural crest potency. The growing realization of the commonalities between pluripotent blastula inner cell mass cells/embryonic stem cells and neural crest cells led LaBonne's group to proposed a new model in which neural crest cells arose via retention of the regulatory network controlling pluripotency in blastula cells and showed that neural crest cells possess a previously unrecognized capacity to form endoderm. This pioneering work created a new framework for studying these developmentally and clinically important cells. The LaBonne lab also demonstrated a role for FGF signaling in the retention of pluripotency underling neural crest genesis, and discovered that a novel switching of effector pathways, from Map Kinase to PI3 Kinase, controls the transit from pluripotency to lineage restriction. They have shed new light on the epigenetic control of pluripotency in naïve blastula cells, including a central role for HDAC and BET activity in maintaining blastula pluripotency and establishment of the neural crest stem cell population. Recent work has used sea lamprey to investigate the evolutionary origins of pluripotency. She is an outspoken advocate for basic science research.

== Awards and honors ==
- March of Dimes Basil O’Connor Award (2001)
- General Motors Cancer Research Scholar (2004)
- American Cancer Society Scholar Award (2004)
- Board of Directors, Society for Developmental Biology (2008–2014)
- Board of Directors, FASEB (2009–2013)
- Steering Committee, National Xenopus Resource (NXR) (2011–present)
- Neurogenesis and Cell Fate Study Section (NCF), NIH (2012–2018)
- Science Policy Committee, FASEB (Federation American Societies for Experimental Biology) (2013–present)
- Ann McClaren Memorial Award, International Society for Differentiation (2014)
- Award for Distinguished Teaching, Weinberg College of Arts and Sciences (2014)
- Chair, Gordon Research Conference on the Neural Crest and Cranial Placodes (2015)
- Erastus O. Haven Endowed Chair, Weinberg College of Arts and Sciences (2017)
- Chair, Department of Molecular Biosciences (2017-2023)
- President, Society for Developmental Biology (2024–2025)
- Fellow, American Association for the Advancement of Science (2025)
- Honorary member, Society for Developmental Biology Academy (2025)
