= Charles N. Sims =

American academic administrator (1835–1908)

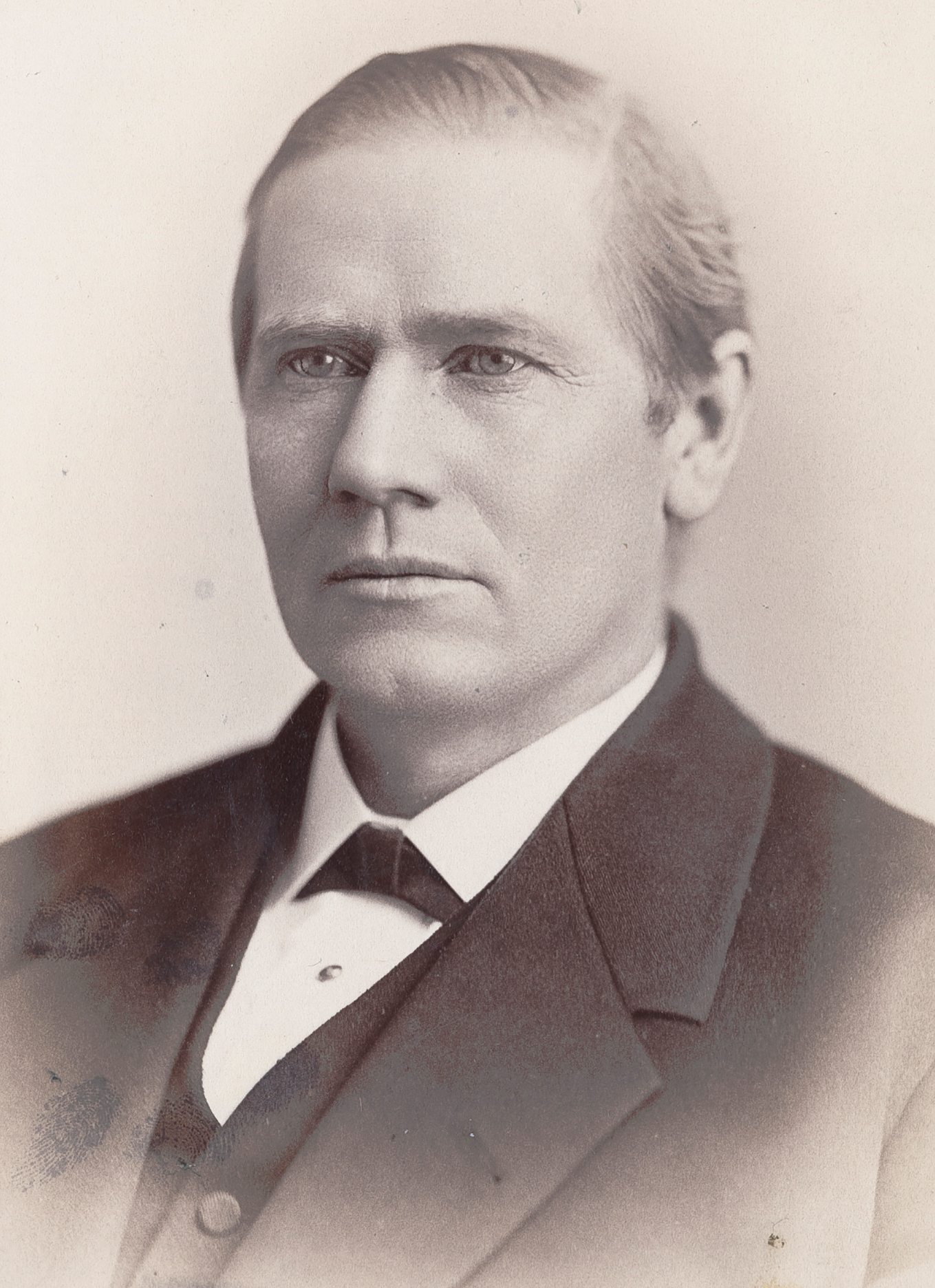
- Sims c. 1893.

3rd Chancellor of Syracuse University
- In office April 1881 – October 1893
- Preceded by: Erastus Otis Haven
- Succeeded by: James Roscoe Day

1st President of Valparaiso Male and Female College
- In office 1860–1862
- Succeeded by: Erastus H. Staley

Personal details
- Born: May 18, 1835 Fairfield, Indiana
- Died: March 27, 1908 (aged 72) Indiana
- Spouse: Eliza Foster
- Education: Indiana Asbury University

Charles N. Sims (May 18, 1835 – March 27, 1908) was an American Methodist preacher and the third chancellor of Syracuse University, serving from 1881 to 1893. Sims Hall and Sims drive on the Syracuse campus is named for him.

== Early life ==
Sims was born in Fairfield, Indiana in 1835. He graduated in 1859 from Indiana Asbury University and received a Masters of Arts degree from there in 1861. Sims served as the first president of Valparaiso Male and Female College for two years starting in 1860 before resigning to become a minister. He was granted a Doctor of Divinity degree from Asbury in 1871. In addition, he received an honorary M. A. from Ohio Wesleyan University (1860) and an honorary LL. D. from Asbury (1882).

== Chancellor of Syracuse University ==
After serving as a minister at various institutions, such as the Summerfield Methodist Church of Brooklyn, Sims was approached to become chancellor of Syracuse University in 1881. During his tenure, Sims pushed for the university to pay off debts, establish endowments, and expand the university with new buildings. Holden Observatory was the first building completed under Sims' building fund, and Sims likewise oversaw the construction of the John Crouse Memorial College for Women (now Crouse College).

In 1883, Sims led an effort to break up and allot the Onondaga Reservation through a state treaty he hoped to persuade the Onondagas to sign. Sims's efforts to persuade the Onondagas to sign a treaty with the state individualizing their landholdings ended in failure. When the ballots were cast, Onondagas voted nearly unanimously against it. When Sims was asked by the Whipple Commission for his opinion on how the state of New York should deal with the Onondaga Nation, he responded, “Obliterate the whole tribe…[,] make them citizens, divide all the lands among them and put them under the laws of citizenship in the State. It is the merest farce in the world to treat them as a nation.”

He was supportive of the Syracuse Orangemen football, who played their first game during his presidency in 1889. He retired as chancellor in 1893.

== Later life ==
Sims returned to Indiana following his retirement. After a few years, he moved once again to Syracuse to become minister of the First Methodist Church. He was made a trustee of the university in 1903. After a final retirement, he returned to Indiana and died in 1908.

== Bibliography ==
- The Life of Rev. Thomas M. Eddy, D.D. New York: Phillips & Hunt. 1880.

Academic offices
Preceded by Erastus Otis Haven	Chancellor of Syracuse University; 1881–1893	Succeeded by James Roscoe Day
