= Alexander Winchell =

American geologist and paleontologist (1824–1891)

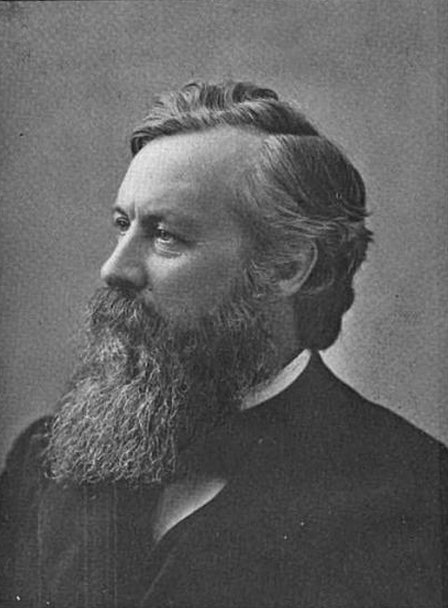

1st Chancellor of Syracuse University
- In office January 1873 – June 1874
- Succeeded by: Erastus Otis Haven

3rd President of Geological Society of America
- In office 1891–1891

Personal details
- Born: December 31, 1824 North East, New York
- Died: February 19, 1891 (aged 66) Ann Arbor, Michigan
- Occupation: Geologist, author
- Known for: Adamites and Preadamites: or, A Popular Discussion (1878), Pre-Adamite hypothesis

Alexander Winchell (December 31, 1824, in North East, New York – February 19, 1891, in Ann Arbor, Michigan) was an American geologist who contributed to this field mainly as an educator and a popular lecturer and writer. His views on evolution aroused controversy among his contemporaries; today the racism of these views is more cause for comment.

== Biography ==
=== Education ===
Winchell graduated from the Wesleyan University of Middletown, Connecticut, in 1847.

=== Early career ===
He then taught at Pennington Male Seminary of New Jersey, Amenia Seminary of New York (where he had previously been a student), an academy in Newbern, Alabama, and the Mesopotamia Female Seminary of Eutaw, the last of which was founded by him. He became president of the Masonic University at Selma, Alabama, in 1853. He was elected as a member of the American Philosophical Society in 1865.

=== Michigan ===
In 1854 Winchell entered the service of the University of Michigan as professor of physics and civil engineering. Eventually he became professor of geology and paleontology at Michigan.

In 1859, Winchell was appointed as State Geologist of Michigan for the newly formed second geological survey of the state. He held the post until 1863 when the state did not appropriate funding to continue the survey. The survey was resumed in 1869, and Winchell was reappointed in April. Owing to conflicting opinions between Winchell and his superiors, he resigned in 1871.

He stayed at Michigan until 1872.

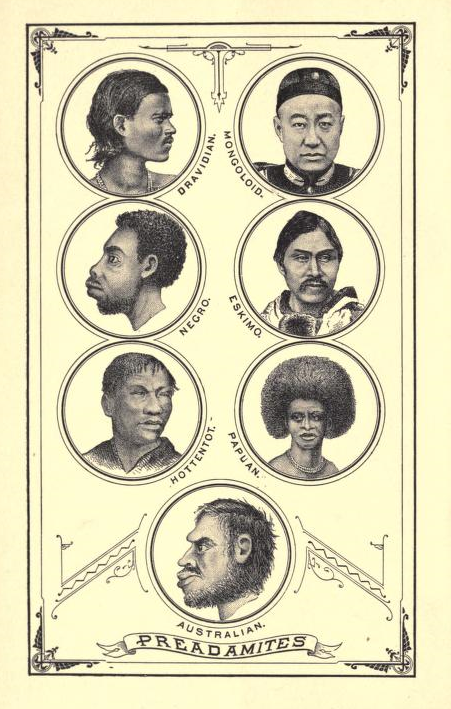
Illustration from Winchell's Preadamites, 1888.

=== Cotton-growing venture ===
In 1863 Winchell took up a lease on a cotton plantation near Vicksburg, Mississippi, under a plan devised by Gen. Lorenzo Thomas to lease plantations along the Mississippi River to loyal men from the North, who would hire black laborers on terms prescribed by the army. Winchell organized the Ann Arbor Cotton Company and sold stock to the university's president, whereupon he received a leave of absence to engage in cotton planting.

General Thomas set wages at a low level ($7 per month for men, $5 for women, minus the cost of medical attention and clothing). Even then, many lessees defrauded the freedmen of their earnings. In the winter of 1863–64, the Treasury Department briefly assumed control of the Mississippi Valley labor system, mandated a substantial increase in black wages, and contemplated leasing the plantations directly to the freedmen. Winchell complained that the Treasury's regulations were "framed in the exclusive interest of the negro and in the non-recognition of the moral sense and patriotism of the white man."

The venture brought him only problems, and after he returned to Michigan in 1864, his brother Martin, who was managing the plantation, was killed by guerrillas.

=== Syracuse University ===
In 1872, he was appointed chancellor of Syracuse University. The depression of 1873 affected both his personal finances and those of Syracuse, and these troubles led him to resign this position in 1874.

=== Late career and controversy ===
In 1875, he worked as a professor of geology and zoology at Vanderbilt University. There, his views on evolution, as expressed in his book Adamites and Preadamites: or, A Popular Discussion (1878), were not acceptable to the university administration because they diverged from Biblical teaching. Today the views on the "inferiority of the Negro" (quote from his 1878 book) would probably have been the focus of controversy. In any case, he was obligated to resign in 1878.

In 1888, he co-founded the Geological Society of America in Ithaca, New York along with John J. Stevenson, Charles H. Hitchcock, John R. Procter and Edward Orton. He served as the 3rd president of GSA in 1891.

He then returned to the University of Michigan, where he was professor of geology and paleontology.

His work in geology was not so significant as his teaching and popular lectures and writing in this field. He was much concerned with reconciling science and religion. He was an advocate of theistic evolution.

== Legacy ==
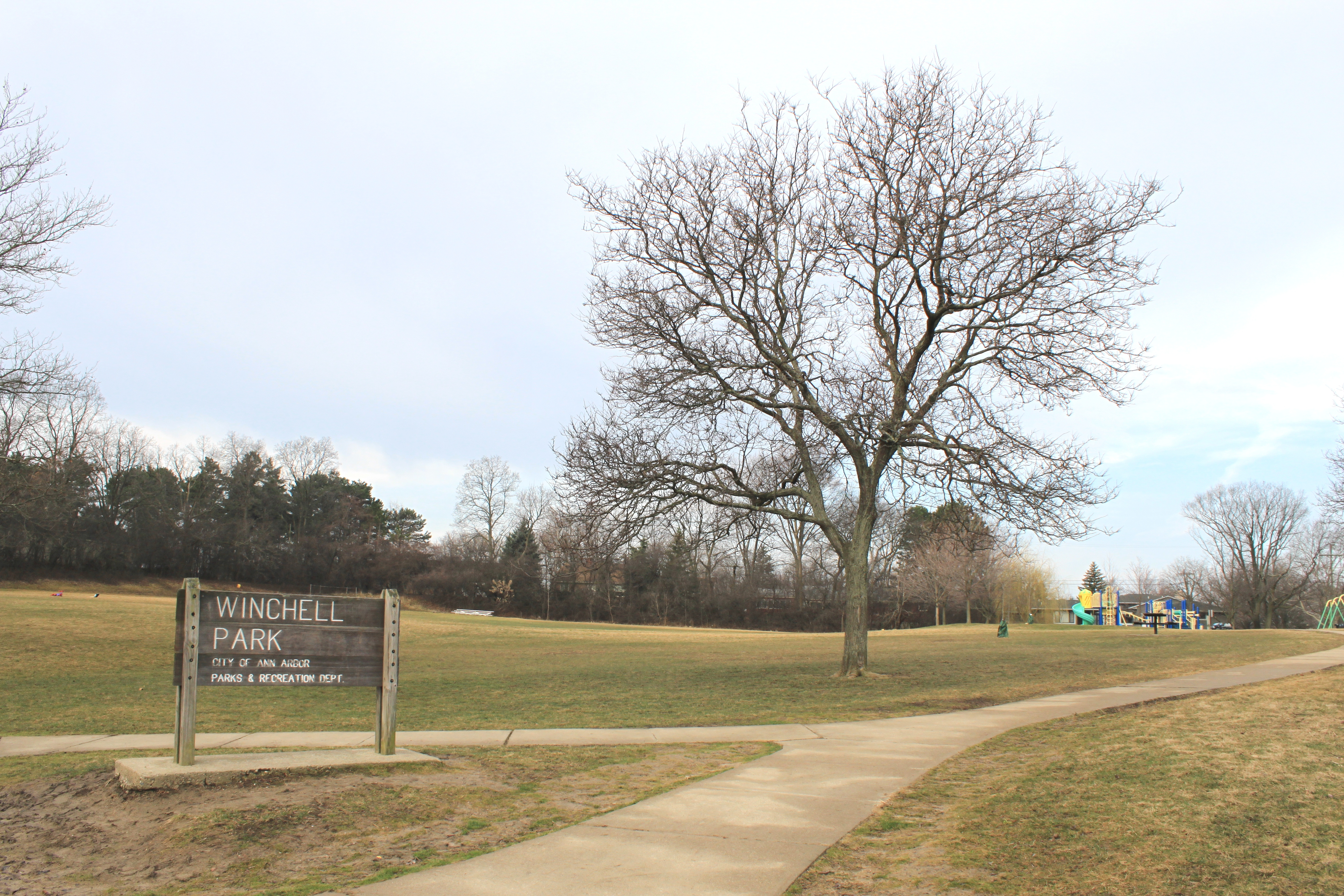
Winchell Park in Ann Arbor, Michigan in 2012. His name was removed from the park in 2021.

The fish Clear chub Hybopsis winchelli (Girard, 1856) is named after him.

The University of Michigan named a wing of the West Quad dormitory after Winchell, and Ann Arbor honored him with Winchell Park, a neighborhood park on the city's east side. Winchell's name was removed from the dormitory in 2018, and the park was renamed after former Ann Arbor Public Schools board president Harold J. Lockett in 2021. In removing Winchell's name, the university described his Preadamites as an "unambiguously racist" work.

== Works ==
- Sketches of Creation (1870)
- The Doctrine of Evolution (1874)
- The Geology of the Stars (1874)
- Reconciliation of Science and Religion (1877)
- Adamites and Preadamites (1878)
- World-Life or Comparative Geology (1883)
- Preadamites Or, a Demonstration of the Existence of Men Before Adam (1888)
- Sparks from a Geologist's Hammer
- Geological Excursions
- Geological Studies
- Proof of Negro inferiority
