= Half a Wing, Three Engines and a Prayer =

Half a Wing, Three Engines and a Prayer, is a book about B-17 crews and missions in World War II, written by Brian D. O'Neill. He is also the author of 303rd Bombardment Group, on the same subject.

During Vietnam, O'Neill served with the U.S. Navy as a destroyer gunner officer and shipyard repair officer. Since then he became an attorney and the General Counsel of Curtiss-Wright Corporation, the aviation company that had manufactured the P-40 Warhawk fighter and the Cyclone B-17 engines during World War II.

The narrative relies heavily on crew diaries and Eighth Air Force registry. The author usually gives a brief description of the upcoming events and the event itself is shown through the tales of various crew members. Each downed Fortress or enemy fighter shot down was usually witnessed by various people, since each B-17 carried ten crew members, including four officers (pilot, co-pilot, navigator and bombardier) and six enlisted men (engineer, ball turret gunner, radioman, tail gunner and two waist gunners).

The story centers around the crew of pilot Lt. Robert J. Hullar, from the 303d Bombardment Group. Each crew was put together and trained since before going to the European Theater of Operations, and sometimes concluding the 25-mission tour at the same time.

== See also ==
- Robert B. Williams, leader of the Schweinfurt–Regensburg mission
- Forrest L. Vosler, recipient of the Medal of Honor

== Bibliography ==
- Half a Wing, Three Engines and a Prayer. McGraw-Hill Companies, 1999. ISBN 978-0-07-134145-5
- 303rd Bombardment Group. Osprey Publishing, 2003. ISBN 1841765376 and 9781841765372
