= Erastus Otis Haven =

American Methodist Episcopal bishop

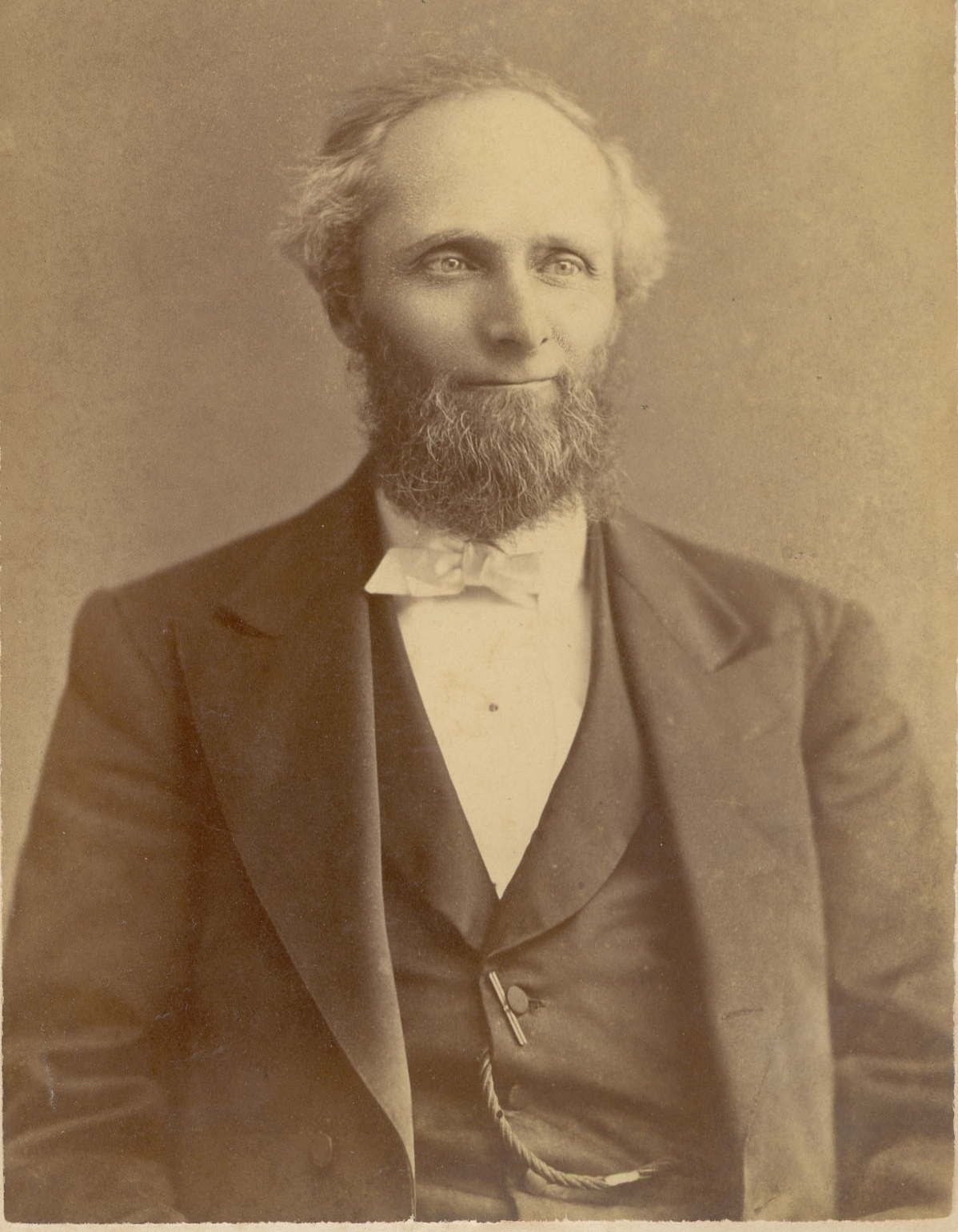
- Haven as the Chancellor of Syracuse University c. 1875

2nd Chancellor of Syracuse University
- In office September 1874 – 1880
- Preceded by: Alexander Winchell
- Succeeded by: Charles N. Sims

3rd President of Northwestern University
- In office 1869–1872
- Preceded by: Randolph Sinks Foster; David H. Wheeler (interim); Henry Sanborn Noyes (interim)
- Succeeded by: Charles Henry Fowler

2nd President of the University of Michigan
- In office 1863–1869
- Preceded by: Henry Philip Tappan
- Succeeded by: James B. Angell

Personal details
- Born: November 1, 1820 Boston, Massachusetts
- Died: August 2, 1881 (aged 60) Salem, Oregon
- Spouse: Mary Frances (Coles) Rice
- Education: Wesleyan College

Erastus Otis Haven (November 1, 1820 – August 2, 1881) was an American academic administrator, serving as the 2nd president of the University of Michigan from 1863 to 1869, as the 3rd president of Northwestern University from 1869 to 1872, and as the 2nd chancellor of Syracuse University from 1874 to 1880. He was a bishop of the Methodist Episcopal Church from 1880 until his death.

== Biography ==
=== Early life ===
Haven was born in Boston, Massachusetts to Jotham Haven, Jr. and Elizabeth (Spear) Haven, having descended from early colonists from Massachusetts Bay Colony, including Edmund Rice one of the founders of Sudbury, Massachusetts. He is also a descendant of John Alden of the Mayflower.

=== Education and early career ===
He graduated from Wesleyan University in 1842. He had charge of a private academy at Sudbury, Massachusetts, while at the same time pursuing a course of theological and general study. He became Principal of Amenia Seminary, New York, in 1846. He entered the Methodist ministry in the New York Annual Conference in 1848. Five years later he accepted the professorship of Latin at the University of Michigan. The following year he became the Chair of English language, literature and history. He resigned in 1856 and returned to Boston, where he served as the editor of Zion's Herald for seven years. During this time he also served two terms in the Massachusetts State Senate and part of the time as an overseer of Harvard University.

=== Administrative appointments ===
In 1863 he became the second President of the University of Michigan, where he served for six years. He then became the sixth President of Methodist-related Northwestern University, Evanston, Illinois. In 1872 he was chosen Secretary of the Board of Education of the M.E. Church. In 1874 he became the Chancellor of Methodist-related Syracuse University in New York. In 1880 he was elected a bishop.

Bishop Haven was a man of great versatility of talent. As a preacher he was able and earnest, didactic and hortatory rather than oratorical. As an administrator he was judicious and successful, but wearied among the details of perceptoral duties. His religious convictions were positive and controlling in all his life, and while ardently devoted to his own denomination, he was also broadly and generously catholic toward all other Christian bodies.

— Frances Elizabeth Willard, A Classic Town: The Story of Evanston (1891)

=== Honors ===
He was given the degree of D.D. by Union College in 1854, and a few years later that of LL.D. by Ohio Wesleyan University. Prior to his election to the episcopacy, he served five times in the General Conference of the M.E. Church, and in 1879 visited Great Britain as a delegate of the M.E. Church to the parent Wesleyan body. A street in Evanston, Illinois is named in his memory and an endowed chair, currently held by Carole LaBonne and Luís Amaral, was established by Northwestern University.

=== Death ===
He died in Salem, Oregon, and was buried at Lee Mission Cemetery in Salem.

== Selected writings ==

- The Young Man Advised, New York, 1855. (discourses delivered in the chapel of the University of Michigan)
- Pillars of Truth, 1866. (on the evidences of Christianity)
- Rhetoric, 1869
- American Progress, 1876
- Autobiography of Erastus O. Haven, D.D., LL.D., 1883

== See also ==
- 84th Massachusetts General Court (1863)
- List of bishops of the United Methodist Church
- Presidents of Northwestern University

Academic offices
Preceded by Henry Philip Tappan	2nd President of the University of Michigan; 1863–1869	Succeeded by Henry S. Frieze (acting); James B. Angell
Preceded by David H. Wheeler	President of Northwestern University; 1869–1872	Succeeded by Charles H. Fowler
Preceded by Alexander Winchell	Chancellor of Syracuse University; 1874–1880	Succeeded by Charles N. Sims
