= List of chancellors of Syracuse University =

This is a list of the chancellors of Syracuse University, a private research university located in Syracuse, New York, United States.

The title of Syracuse University's head officer was changed from "Chancellor" to "Chancellor and President" in 1952 during the Tolley administration.

== List ==
The following persons have served as chancellor of Syracuse University:

#	Image	Name	Term start	Term end	Ref.
Chancellors of Syracuse University (1873–1952)
1		Alexander Winchell	February 1873	1874	
2		Rev. Erastus O. Haven	September 1874	1880	
3		Rev. Charles N. Sims	June 1881	October 1893	
4		James Roscoe Day	April 1894	June 14, 1922	
5		Charles Wesley Flint	June 1922	1936	
6	–	William Pratt Graham	May 1937	September 1942	
7	–	William Pearson Tolley	September 1942	September 1969	
Chancellor and Presidents of Syracuse University (1952–present)
8		John E. Corbally	September 1, 1969	March 10, 1971 (Note: Resigned to lead the University of Illinois system.)	
interim	–	Melvin A. Eggers	March 15, 1971	June 4, 1971	
9	–	Melvin A. Eggers	June 4, 1971	August 19, 1991	
10	–	Kenneth Shaw	August 20, 1991	July 31, 2004	
11		Nancy Cantor	August 1, 2004	December 31, 2013 (Note: Resigned to lead Rutgers University–Newark.)	
12		Kent Syverud	January 13, 2014	April 15, 2026 (Note: Resigned to lead University of Michigan.)	
13		Mike Haynie	April 15, 2026		
