= Whitneyville, Maine =

Town in Maine, United States

- Town
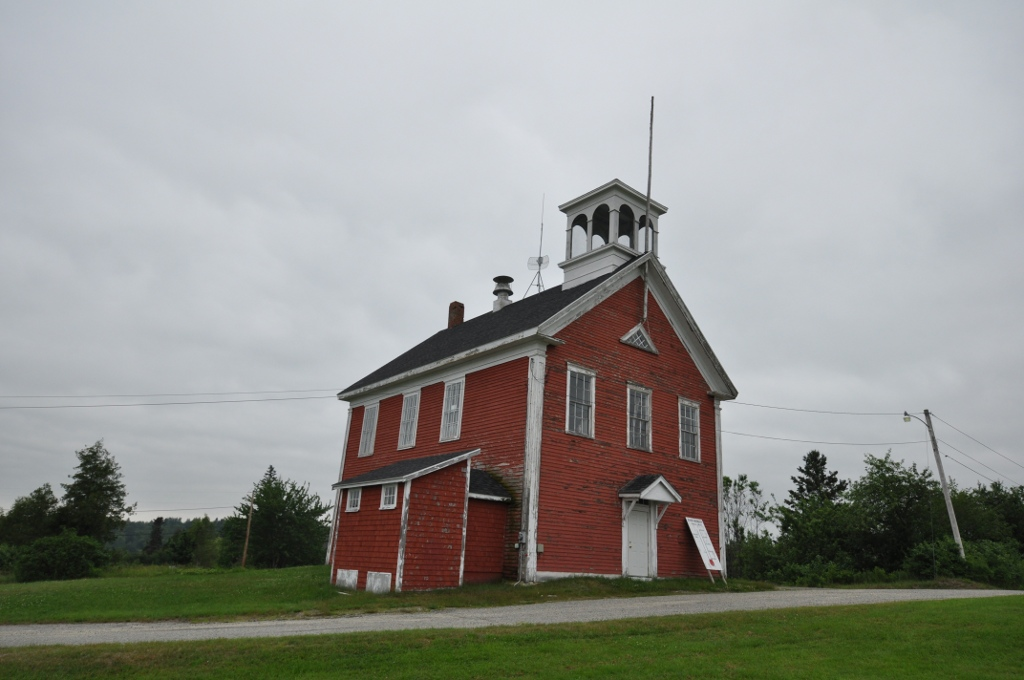
- The old library building

- Location within Maine Location within the United States
- Coordinates: 44°43′33″N 67°31′44″W
- Country: United States
- State: Maine
- County: Washington

Area
  - Total: 15.19 sq mi (39.34 km^{2})
  - Land: 14.88 sq mi (38.54 km^{2})
  - Water: 0.31 sq mi (0.80 km^{2})
- Elevation: 144 ft (44 m)

Population (2020)
  - Total: 202
  - Density: 13/sq mi (5.2/km^{2})
- Time zone: UTC-5 (Eastern (EST))
  - Summer (DST): UTC-4 (EDT)
- ZIP code: 04654
- Area code: 207
- FIPS code: 23-85290
- GNIS feature ID: 582814
- Website: Town of Whitneyville

Whitneyville is a town in Washington County, Maine, United States. The town was named after Colonel Joseph Whitney, a mill owner. The population was 202 at the 2020 census.

== Geography ==
According to the United States Census Bureau, the town has a total area of 15.19 square miles (39.34 km^{2}), of which 14.88 square miles (38.54 km^{2}) is land and 0.31 square miles (0.80 km^{2}) is water.

== Demographics ==
Historical population
| Census | Pop. | Note | %± |
|---|---|---|---|
| 1850 | 519 | | — |
| 1860 | 579 | | 11.6% |
| 1870 | 569 | | −1.7% |
| 1880 | 492 | | −13.5% |
| 1890 | 413 | | −16.1% |
| 1900 | 424 | | 2.7% |
| 1910 | 258 | | −39.2% |
| 1920 | 210 | | −18.6% |
| 1930 | 229 | | 9.0% |
| 1940 | 262 | | 14.4% |
| 1950 | 227 | | −13.4% |
| 1960 | 229 | | 0.9% |
| 1970 | 155 | | −32.3% |
| 1980 | 264 | | 70.3% |
| 1990 | 241 | | −8.7% |
| 2000 | 262 | | 8.7% |
| 2010 | 220 | | −16.0% |
| 2020 | 202 | | −8.2% |
U.S. Decennial Census

=== 2010 census ===
As of the census of 2010, there were 220 people, 101 households, and 61 families living in the town. The population density was 14.8 inhabitants per square mile (5.7/km^{2}). There were 127 housing units at an average density of 8.5 per square mile (3.3/km^{2}). The racial makeup of the town was 98.2% White, 0.5% African American, 0.5% Asian, and 0.9% from other races. Hispanic or Latino of any race were 2.7% of the population.

There were 101 households, of which 20.8% had children under the age of 18 living with them, 45.5% were married couples living together, 7.9% had a female householder with no husband present, 6.9% had a male householder with no wife present, and 39.6% were non-families. 28.7% of all households were made up of individuals, and 9% had someone living alone who was 65 years of age or older. The average household size was 2.18 and the average family size was 2.69.

The median age in the town was 47 years. 15% of residents were under the age of 18; 10% were between the ages of 18 and 24; 20.4% were from 25 to 44; 38.7% were from 45 to 64; and 15.9% were 65 years of age or older. The gender makeup of the town was 51.8% male and 48.2% female.

=== 2000 census ===
As of the census of 2000, there were 262 people, 105 households, and 61 families living in the town. The population density was 18.3 people per square mile (7.1/km^{2}). There were 139 housing units at an average density of 9.7 per square mile (3.8/km^{2}). The racial makeup of the town was 98.85% White, 0.76% from other races, and 0.38% from two or more races. Hispanic or Latino of any race were 1.15% of the population.

There were 105 households, out of which 30.5% had children under the age of 18 living with them, 41.0% were married couples living together, 11.4% had a female householder with no husband present, and 41.9% were non-families. 33.3% of all households were made up of individuals, and 16.2% had someone living alone who was 65 years of age or older. The average household size was 2.50 and the average family size was 3.28.

In the town, the population was spread out, with 27.5% under the age of 18, 5.7% from 18 to 24, 26.3% from 25 to 44, 25.2% from 45 to 64, and 15.3% who were 65 years of age or older. The median age was 39 years. For every 100 females, there were 91.2 males. For every 100 females age 18 and over, there were 90.0 males.

The median income for a household in the town was $30,000, and the median income for a family was $48,750. Males had a median income of $26,667 versus $30,250 for females. The per capita income for the town was $13,115. About 3.5% of families and 10.3% of the population were below the poverty line, including 6.3% of those under the age of eighteen and 13.5% of those 65 or over.
