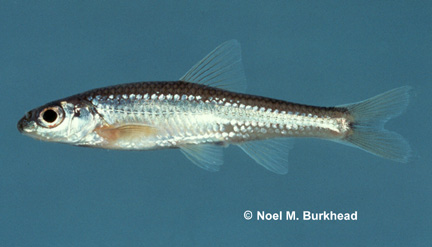

Conservation status
- Least Concern (IUCN 3.1)

- Secure (NatureServe)

Scientific classification
- Kingdom: Animalia
- Phylum: Chordata
- Class: Actinopterygii
- Order: Cypriniformes
- Family: Leuciscidae
- Subfamily: Pogonichthyinae
- Genus: Hybopsis
- Species: H. amblops

Binomial name
- Hybopsis amblops (Rafinesque, 1820)

Synonyms
- Rutilus amblops Rafinesque, 1820; Notropis amblops (Rafinesque, 1820); Hybopsis gracilis Agassiz, 1854; Cearatichthys hyalinus Cope, 1868

= Bigeye chub =

Species of fish

Bigeye chub (Hybopsis amblops) is a species of freshwater ray-finned fish belonging to the family Leuciscidae, the shiners, daces and minnows. This species is found in the United States.

== Geographic distribution ==
The native range of the Bigeye chub includes the Lake Ontario and Lake Erie drainages in New York, Pennsylvania, Ohio, and Michigan as well as the Ohio River basin from New York to eastern Illinois and south to the Tennessee River drainage, Georgia and Alabama, and the Ozarks of southern Missouri, northern Arkansas, and northeastern Oklahoma. There is one record of this species in the Cottonwood River in Kansas. It is absent from the Missouri River drainage. This species is listed threatened in Illinois.

== Ecology ==
The bigeye chub is a freshwater fish of the United States. It prefers a habitat near riffles in quiet water with aquatic vegetation, in small to moderate size, clear-water tributaries with a sand, gravel, or rocky substrate. It is highly intolerant of siltation.

== Characteristics ==
This species has a long, blunt snout with a down turned, overhanging mouth. It is a light greenish yellow color, besides the black lateral stripe stretching from its mouth to the tail. Like other Hybopisis, this species has a single mouth barbel that contains taste buds. The bigeye chub has an elliptical eye shape that is directed upward. They reach about 2 to 3 inches (51 to 76 mm) in length. Their diet consists of aquatic insects such as different kinds of larvae and large mayfly.

== History ==
The bigeye chub experienced drastic population declines in the mid 20th century. In the 1970's and 1980's, they were so rapidly disappearing they were thought to be extirpated. With recovery methods and research, a steady increase has been seen since 2000 in central Illinois. They are now considered threatened there.
