= D'Aniello Institute for Veterans and Military Families =

Research institute at Syracuse University in New York, U.S.

Institute for Veterans and Military Families
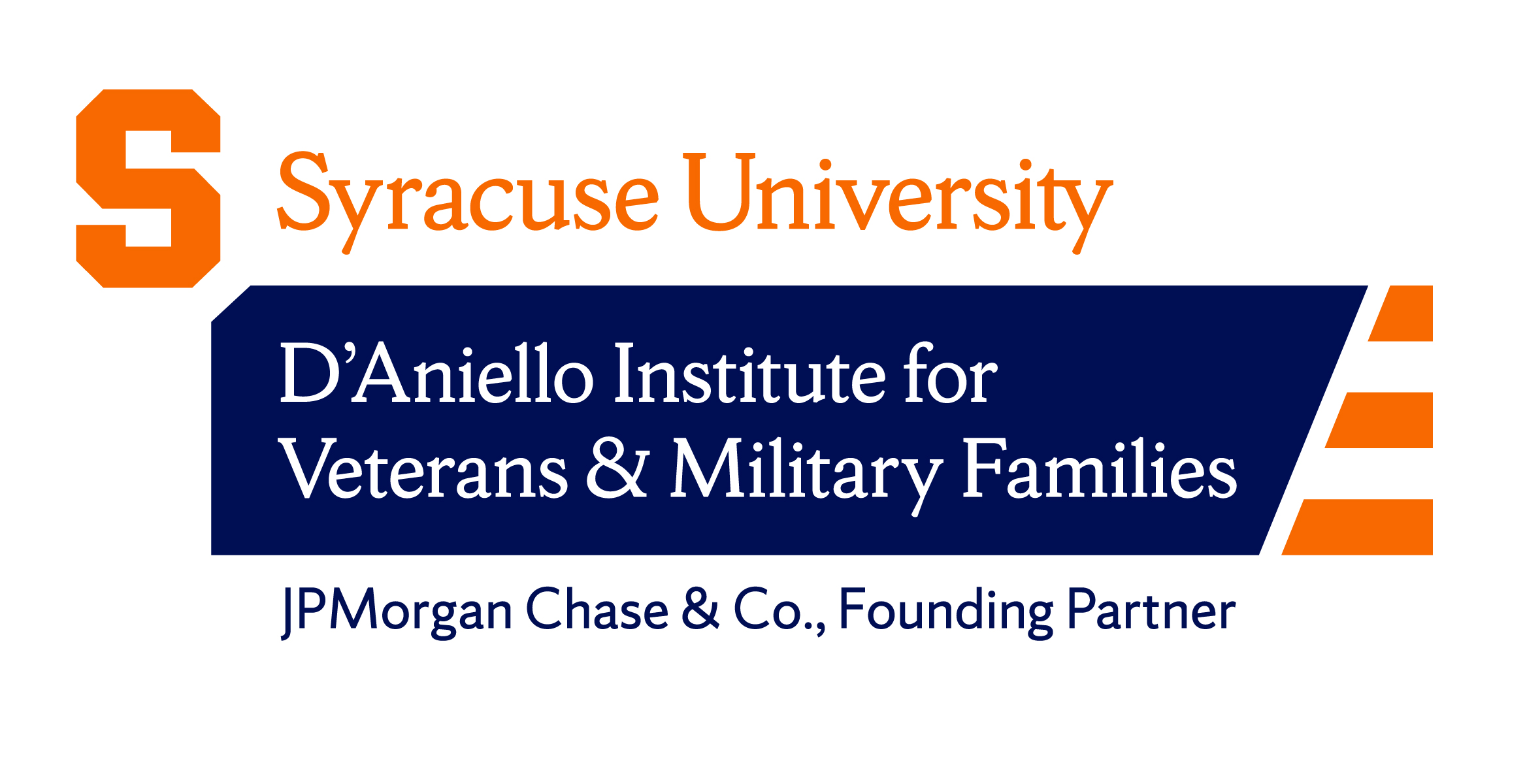

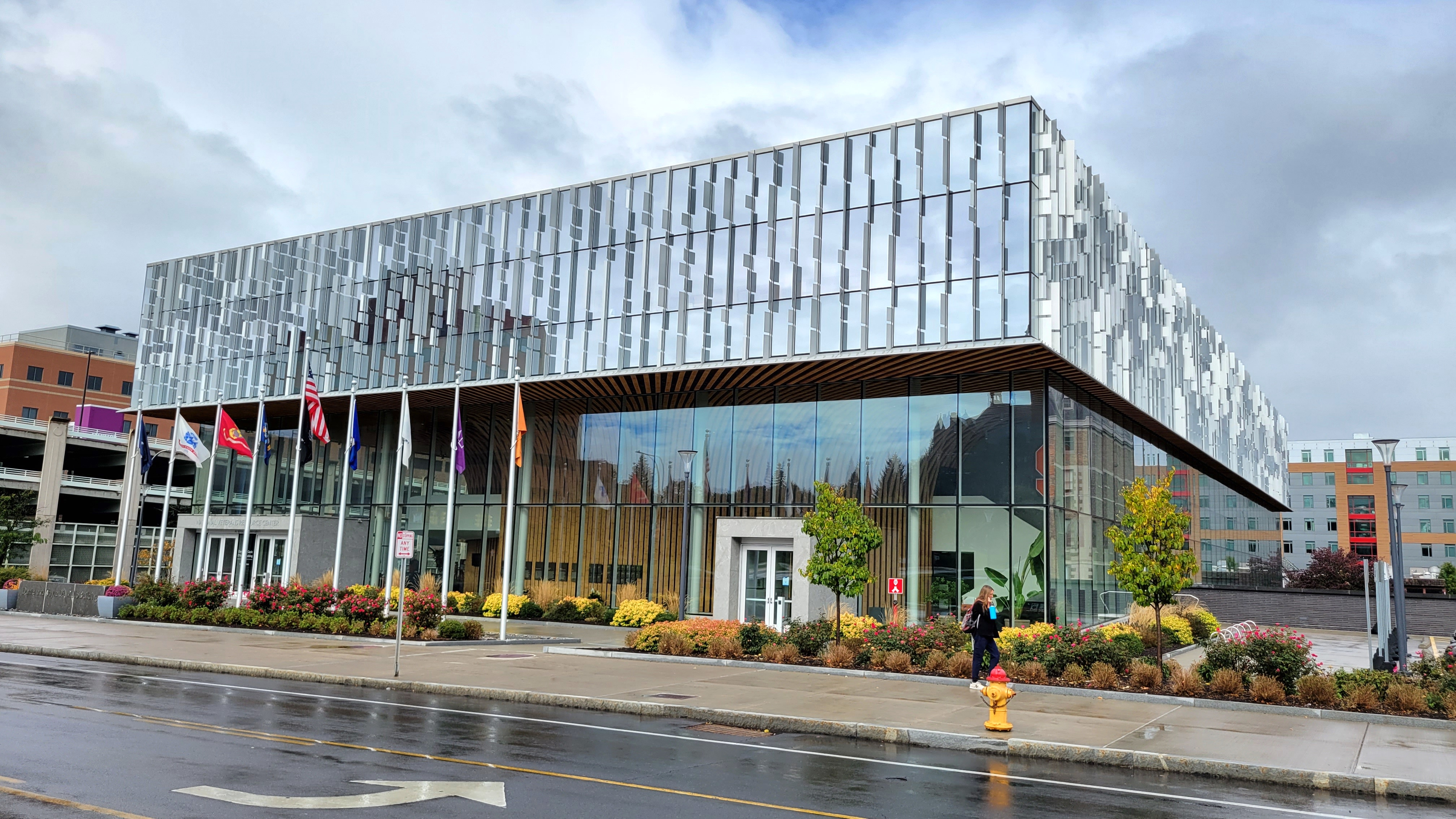
- National Veterans Resource Center
- Established: June 11, 2011; 14 years ago
- Founder: J. Michael Haynie
- Type: Private research institution
- Headquarters: National Veterans Resource Center
- Location(s): 101 Waverly Ave Syracuse, New York 13244 United States
- Coordinates: 43.04061°N 76.13630°W
- Fields: Public policy; public health; business; epidemiology; sociology; nonprofit
- Executive Director: J. Michael Haynie
- Parent organization: Syracuse University
- Staff: 107 (2024)
- Website: ivmf.syracuse.edu

The D'Aniello Institute for Veterans and Military Families (IVMF) is an interdisciplinary research institution that informs and advances the policy, economic and wellness concerns of the America’s veterans and families. It is housed in the National Veterans Resource Center at Syracuse University. The IVMF annually serves thousands of U.S. veterans, service members, and their families around the world and as of 2024, the Institute had served 200,000 military service members, veterans, and their families through their programs.

== History ==
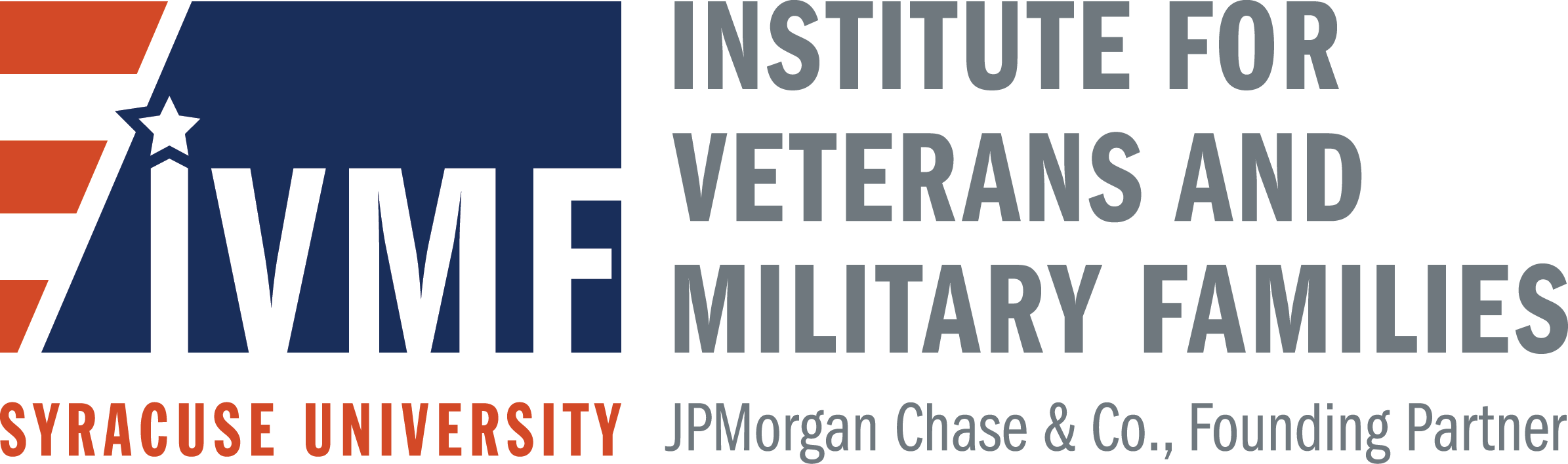
Former IVMF logo.

IVMF was launched in June 2011 by Mike Haynie and then chancellor Nancy Cantor to bring together several pre-existing veterans related institutes at the university. The institute traces its beginning to The Entrepreneurship Bootcamp for Veterans with Disabilities (EBV) which started within the Martin J. Whitman School of Management in 2006-2007. Under the leadership of Steven Barnes, IVMF grew from four employees in 2006 to more than 70 team members across eight states in 2018.

== Programs ==
The IVMF is the first interdisciplinary academic institute committed to advocacy, research, and assistance for military veterans and their families.

The IVMF provides programs in career, vocational and entrepreneurship education and training, providing service members, veterans and their families with the skills needed to be successful in education, work and life. The IVMF also coordinates comprehensive collective impact strategies; and works with communities and nonprofits to enhance service delivery for veterans and their families.

The IVMF has designed a free, comprehensive career training, certification and employment program called Onward to Opportunity in conjunction with the Veterans Career Transition Program (O_{2}O). This program is designed to launch veterans into their next career with more than 30 industry-recognized career tracks and courses.

AmericaServes is a national initiative of IVMF that serves 18 communities all over the United States. Their services include employment assistance, assistance with VA benefits, education, transportation, mental/behavioral health resources and housing.

The V-WISE Veteran Women Igniting the Spirit of Entrepreneurship program brings female veterans and female spouses/partners of military servicemembers together for a conference focused on entrepreneurial training and support.

In early April 2017 The IVMF and the United States Department of Veterans Affairs' Center for Innovation (VACI) launched a national pilot project aimed at demonstrating the merits of a community-based health care and services coordinated referral system within the Institute’s AmericaServes initiative.

By 2024, the Institute had served 200,000 military service members, veterans, and their families through their programs. In 2020, Syracuse University Graduated Over 200 Military-Connected Students.

In November 2021, IVMF was renamed to honor a $30 million gift from SU trustee Daniel D’Aniello. He previously had donated $20 million in 2019 to support the construction of the National Veterans Resource Center.

=== Publications ===
The IVMF routinely publishes publications and research reports on veteran related issues. It also conducts surveys in collaboration with Military times and Blue Star Families.

IVMF researchers have been called to testify before US Senate and House committees on Veterans Affairs. As of 2024, the IVMF has produced over 1,500 research products, 577+ conferences & Capitol Hill appearances since 2017, 110+ publications & reports, and 119+ presentations & key engagements. It was featured on 60 Minutes in 2013.

The IVMF uses the SAS Analytics software to analyze vast amounts of data on veterans, career opportunities, communities and non-profits. It also trains veterans in analytics fields.

== National Veterans Resource Center ==
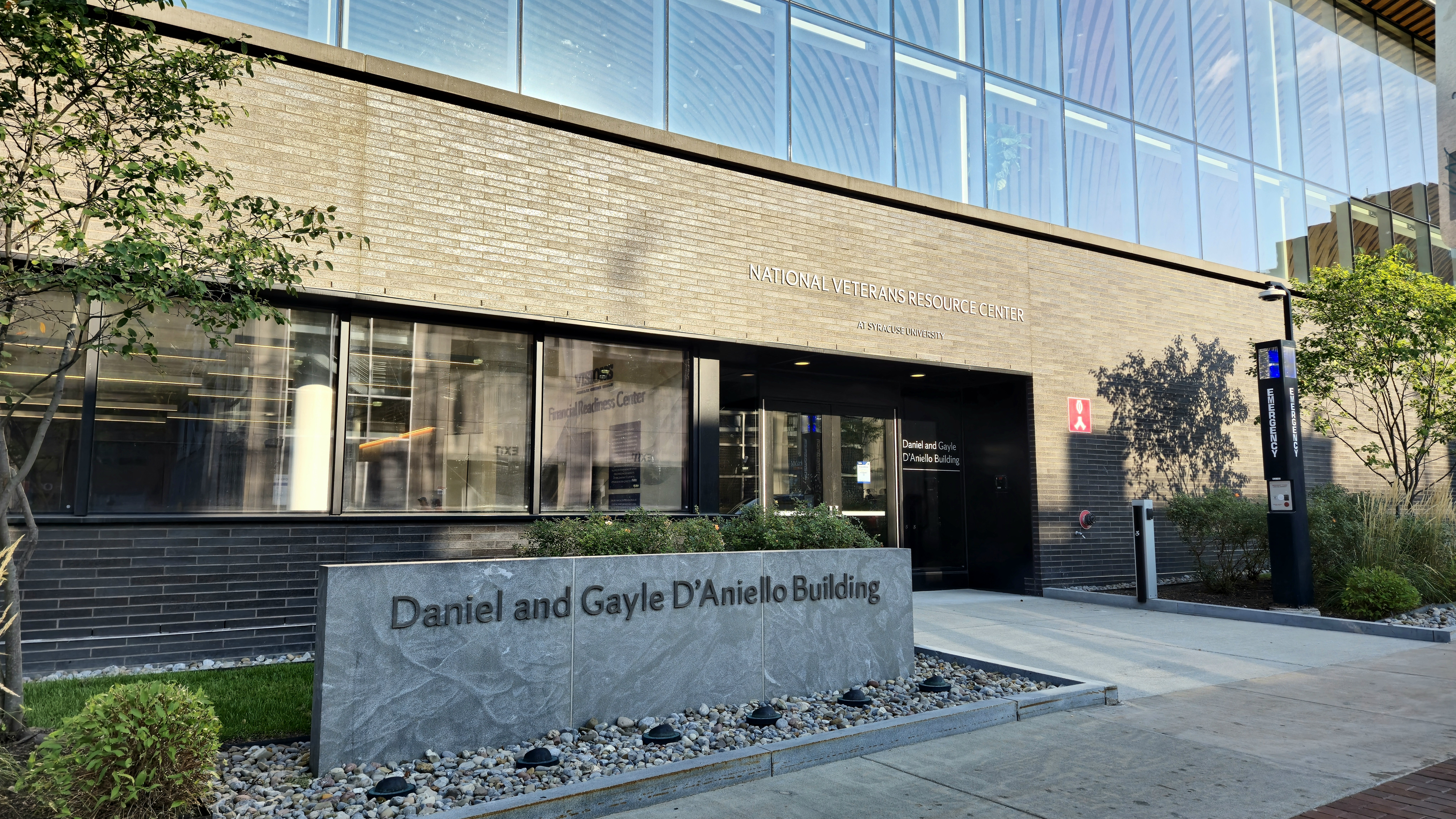
The Daniel & Gayle D’Aniello Building, home to the National Veterans Resource Center.

The IVMF is housed in the National Veterans Resource Center (NVRC) at the Daniel & Gayle D’Aniello building. The building was designed by SHoP Architects in 2016, and the construction finished in spring 2020. The $64 million facility was funded entirely with philanthropic gifts. A $20 million gift was announced in 2018 by Daniel D’Aniello, '68, to support the construction of the NVRC. The IVMF received $14.5 million from the Upstate Revitalization Initiative.

The four-story, 126,000-square-foot complex has space for a variety of veteran-related organizations and houses a 750-seat auditorium, a cafe, a gallery, a research center, and a banquet hall that turns into a lounge/study area. The facility serves Regional Student Veteran Resource Center, the U.S. Department of Veterans Affairs "Vet-Success on Campus", the National Center of Excellence for Veteran Business Ownership, Veteran Business Outreach Center and Accelerator, and Syracuse University’s Office of Veteran and Military Affairs, and offices for the Army and Air Force ROTC.

== Leadership and staff ==
J. Michael Haynie is the founder and Executive Director of the IVMF. He also serves as vice Chancellor for Strategic Initiatives and Innovation at Syracuse University. The IVMF advisory board includes researchers and leaders in policy, military, higher education, and veterans’ affairs fields.

In 2024, the Institute had a staff of over 100 team members in nine countries.

== Funding ==
As of 2021, JPMorgan Chase, the founding partner of the institute, has contributed $34 million to the institute since its founding. Corporate sponsors include Lockheed Martin, SAS Institute, Prudential Financial, Walmart Foundation, Accenture, and others. In 2019, the IVMF accounted for 30 percent of the externally sponsored research funding generated by Syracuse University.

In 2024, IVMF received grant from Google ($3 million) & Micron Technology ($3 million).
