= Charles Wesley Flint =

American bishop

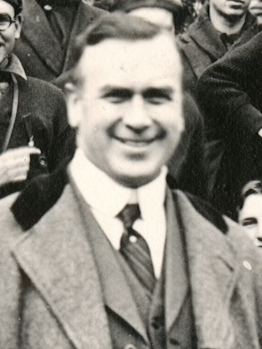
- Day c. 1922

5th Chancellor of Syracuse University
- In office September 1922 – May 1936
- Preceded by: James Roscoe Day
- Succeeded by: William Pratt Graham

Charles Wesley Flint (November 14, 1878 – December 12, 1964) was a Canadian-born educator and bishop of the Methodist Church in the United States.

== Early life ==
Charles Wesley Flint was born in Stouffville, Ontario, Canada. He graduated from the University of Toronto and went on to study at Drew Theological Seminary and Columbia University.

== Career ==
Flint began his Methodist ministry in the Northwest Conference of the Iowa at the age of 21.

In 1915, Flint was serving as the pastor of the New York Avenue Methodist church in Brooklyn. On June 15 of that year, he was elected president of Cornell College. He was inaugurated on November 19. He was the president of Cornell College for seven years (1915–22), then was the fifth chancellor of Syracuse University from 1922 until his election as a bishop. During his time as chancellor, he served as an advisor to the Alpha Phi Omega chapter at Syracuse University.

== Publications ==
Flint wrote a biography of Charles Wesley in 1957.

== Personal life ==
Flint married Clara Yetter in 1901; they had a daughter, Dr Lois Flint, and a son, George Y. Flint, who served as a Methodist minister in Ohio, New Jersey and Maryland.

Academic offices
Preceded by James Roscoe Day	Chancellor of Syracuse University; 1922–1936	Succeeded by William Pratt Graham
