= Melvin A. Eggers =

American academic administrator (1916–1994)

Melvin Arnold Eggers (February 21, 1916 – November 20, 1994) was the ninth Chancellor and President of Syracuse University. Eggers took office in 1971, amidst tumult at Syracuse and other university campuses, and retired in 1991. He is the third-longest serving chancellor in Syracuse history.

== Early life and education ==
Eggers was born February 21, 1916, in Fort Wayne, Indiana, and earned bachelor's and master's degrees in economics from Indiana University in 1940 and 1941, respectively. He served in the Navy as a Japanese-language officer during World War II and was discharged as a Lieutenant in 1946. Eggers had begun graduate work at the University of Chicago before the war, and continued it at Yale University after the war ended.

== Career at Syracuse ==
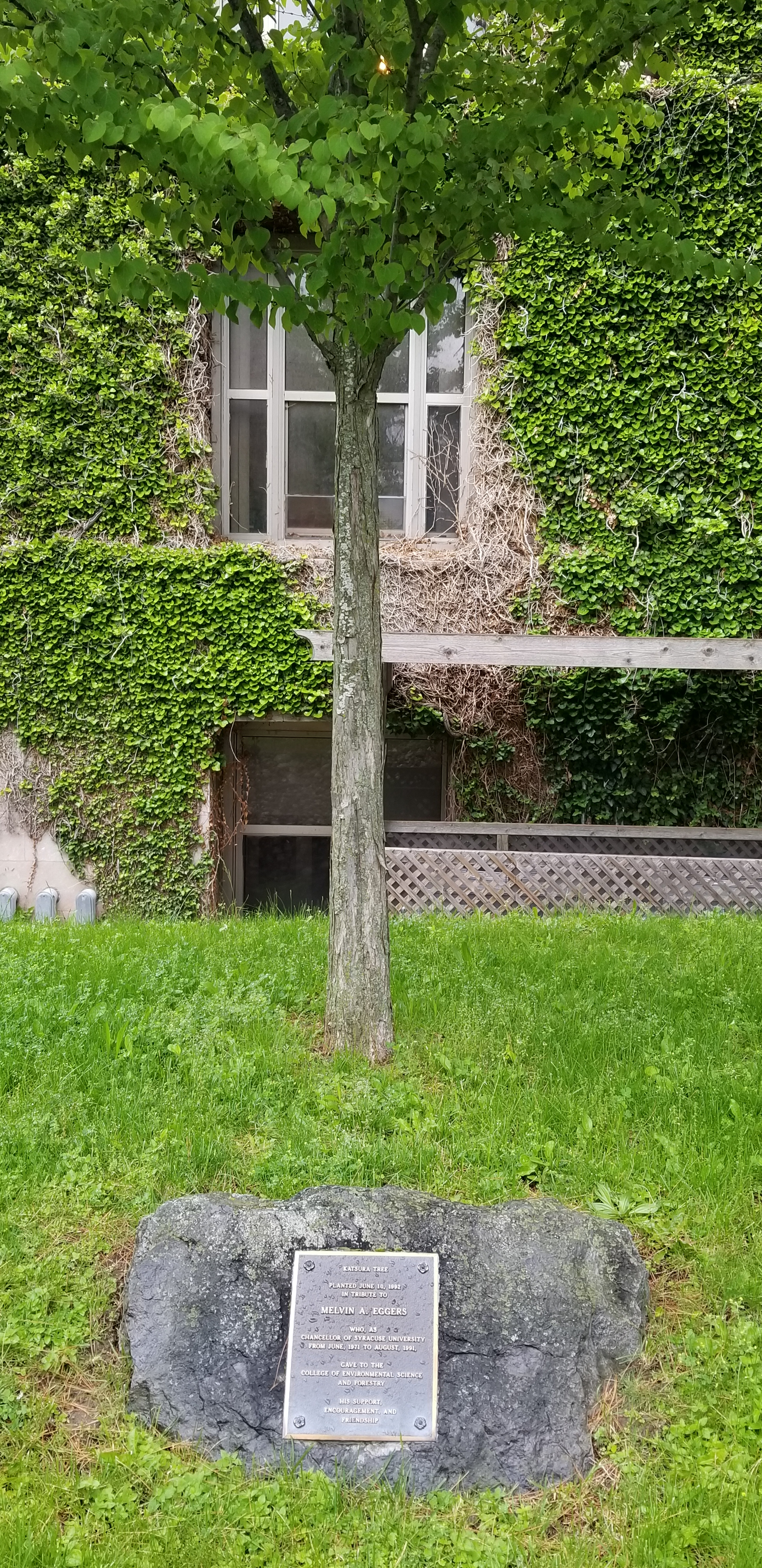
Melvin Eggers memorial tree and plaque on SUNY-ESF campus.

After receiving his Ph.D. in economics from Yale in 1950, Eggers became an assistant professor in the economics department at Syracuse University, where he subsequently became department chair (1960) and full professor (1963). As an economics professor, his specialization was in finance, industrial organization, and economic development.

Eggers was appointed provost and vice chancellor for academic affairs on July 1, 1970.

=== Chancellor and President ===
When the previous chancellor, John E. Corbally, unexpectedly left Syracuse to lead the University of Illinois system, Eggers was named the acting chancellor effective on March 15, 1971. He was formally appointed the ninth chancellor and president on June 4, 1971.

Eggers took office in the midst of student demonstrations and strikes, primarily focused on ending the Vietnam War. He also had to deal with the financial stress affecting similar private universities. SU was experiencing sharp drop in enrollments in hard sciences as the job market shifted from those fields. Within the same year, Eggers instituted a hiring freeze and raised tuition by 5% to balance the budget shortfall of several millions.

Eggers is widely seen as having strengthened Syracuse academically and tangibly over his two decades as chancellor. During his tenure, enrollment rose by more than 3,000 students, the number of faculty members grew ~20%, and faculty grants almost doubled. Over 29 major buildings were either opened or renovated, including Center for Science and Technology, the Schine Student Center, the Crouse-Hinds Hall, and the Carrier Dome. He also directed renovation of the Hall of Languages. He created the a separate S. I. Newhouse School of Public Communications within first few months of his post.

Eggers also guided the university community through the trauma of the December 21, 1988 bombing of Pan Am Flight 103, which crashed in Lockerbie, Scotland, killing 35 students who were returning from a semester of study at Syracuse's London campus.

Eggers retired as chancellor in 1991. He was succeeded by Kenneth "Buzz" Shaw.

== Public service ==
Eggers served on numerous committees and his prominent role in state, local, and national affairs benefited SU as well as the wider community. At the national level, Eggers was an influential figure in the development of public policy for higher education. He was a member of the American Council on Education, former chairman of the National Association of Independent Colleges and Universities. A member of the Association of American Universities, he was chairman of the Committee on Research Libraries and served on its executive committee. At the state level, he served as a member of the New York State Commissioner's Advisory Council on Post Secondary Education, the Board of Trustees of the Commission on Independent Colleges and Universities of New York, and also as co-chairman of the Presidential Task Force on Financial Policy of the Association of Colleges and Universities of the State of New York. Locally, He consulted to several financial institutions, served on the boards of several local businesses and industries, was appointment to the Central New York Regional Economic Development Council, and chaired of the board of the Greater Syracuse Chamber of Commerce.

== Honors ==
Eggers received honorary doctorates from Nazareth College (New York) (1981), State University of New York (1985), and Indiana University (1986). He was awarded the Simon Le Moyne Medal from Le Moyne College in 1978. In 1979 he was designated by the Chamber as Businessman of the Year.

Eggers Hall, which houses the Maxwell School of Citizenship and Public Affairs at Syracuse University was dedicated in his honor in October 1994.

== Publications ==
- Economic Processes: The Level of Economic Activity. Holt, Rinehart and Winston. OCLC 747526290.
- Economic Processes: The Composition of Economic Activity. Holt, Rinehart & Winston. OCLC 1068503236.

== Death ==
He died at the age of 78 on November 20, 1994, at his home in DeWitt, a suburb of Syracuse. He was survived by his wife Mildred (née Chenoweth) and three adult children.

== Notes ==
Academic offices
Preceded by John E. Corbally	Chancellor of Syracuse University; 1971 - 1991	Succeeded by Kenneth "Buzz" Shaw
