= William P. Tolley =

American University president (1900–1996)

William Pearson Tolley

7th Chancellor and President (Note: The title of Syracuse University's head officer was changed from "Chancellor" to "Chancellor and President" on 14 November 1952.) of Syracuse University
- In office 1 September 1942 – 1 September 1969
- Preceded by: William Pratt Graham
- Succeeded by: John E. Corbally

Personal details
- Born: September 13, 1900 Honesdale, Pennsylvania
- Died: January 26, 1996 (aged 95) Syracuse, New York

William Pearson Tolley (September 13, 1900 – January 26, 1996) was an American academic.

== Biography ==
Born in Honesdale, Pennsylvania, he grew up in Binghamton, New York. He was valedictorian of his high school class. He graduated from Syracuse University in 1922. Intending to enter the ministry, he enrolled in Drew University while also taking graduate courses at Columbia University. He received a Bachelor of Divinity degree from Drew in 1925, a master's degree from Simmons University in 1924, and another Master's from Columbia in 1927, followed by a PhD from Columbia in 1930. While at Drew he was alumni secretary for two years; he also taught philosophy and served as assistant to the president. In 1928 he became acting dean of the new undergraduate college for men at Drew, Brothers College, and full dean in 1929.

He assumed the presidency of Allegheny College on July 1, 1931, and became Syracuse University Chancellor in September 1942. Tolley led Syracuse through the war crisis and through major expansion until his retirement in 1969. University assets grew from $15 million to $200 million; undergraduate enrollment expanded from 3,800 to 24,000, and graduate enrollment from 400 to 8,000. Tolley received a Doctor of Laws from Allegheny in 1943. In retirement he chaired the board of Mohawk Airlines. He died on January 26, 1996, in Syracuse, New York.

== Legacy ==
As the end of World War II approached, Syracuse University Chancellor William Tolley was asked by President Roosevelt to serve as a member of a small group of college and university leaders, tasked with creating what would ultimately become the Servicemen's Readjustment Act of 1944 (the GI Bill). Today most historians assert that the GI Bill is among the most important legislative acts in the history of this country, as the legislation played a key role in positioning the U.S. as a technological superpower throughout the 21st century.

Academic offices
Preceded by William Pratt Graham	Chancellor of Syracuse University; 1942–1969	Succeeded by John E. Corbally
