= McKim, Mead & White =

American architectural firm

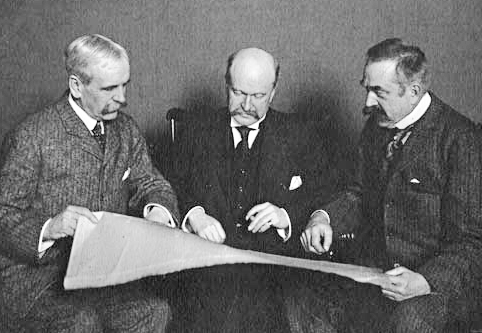
The principals of McKim, Mead & White (left to right): William Rutherford Mead, Charles Follen McKim, and Stanford White

McKim, Mead & White was an American architectural firm based in New York City. The firm came to define architectural practice, urbanism, and the ideals of the American Renaissance in fin de siècle New York.

The firm's founding partners, Charles Follen McKim (1847–1909), William Rutherford Mead (1846–1928), and Stanford White (1853–1906), were giants in the architecture of their time, and remain important as innovators and leaders in the development of modern architecture worldwide. They formed a school of classically trained, technologically skilled designers who practiced well into the mid-20th century. According to Robert A. M. Stern, only Frank Lloyd Wright was more important to the identity and character of modern American architecture.

The firm's New York City buildings include Manhattan's former Pennsylvania Station, the Brooklyn Museum, and the main campus of Columbia University.

Elsewhere in the state of New York and New England, the firm designed college, library, school and other buildings such as the Boston Public Library, Walker Art Building at Bowdoin College, the Garden City campus of Adelphi University, and the Rhode Island State House. In Washington, D.C., the firm renovated the West and East Wings of the White House, and designed Roosevelt Hall on Fort Lesley J. McNair and the National Museum of American History.

Across the United States, the firm designed buildings in Illinois, Kentucky, Michigan, Nebraska, Ohio, Pennsylvania, Rhode Island, Tennessee, Washington and Wisconsin. Outside of the United States, the firm developed buildings in Canada, Cuba, and Italy. The scope and breadth of their achievement is notable, considering that many of the technologies and strategies they employed were nascent or non-existent when they began working in the 1880s.

== History ==
=== Background ===
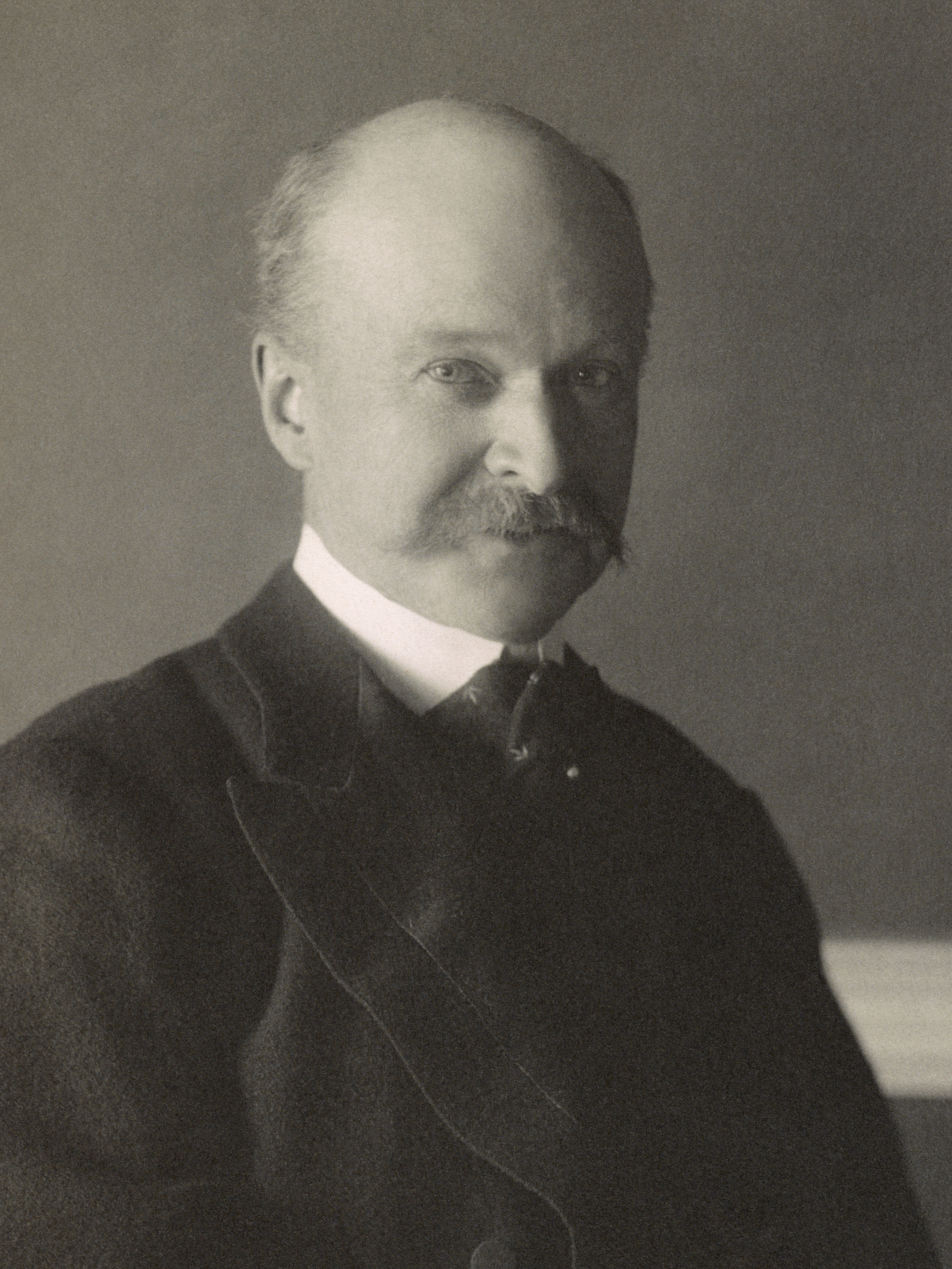
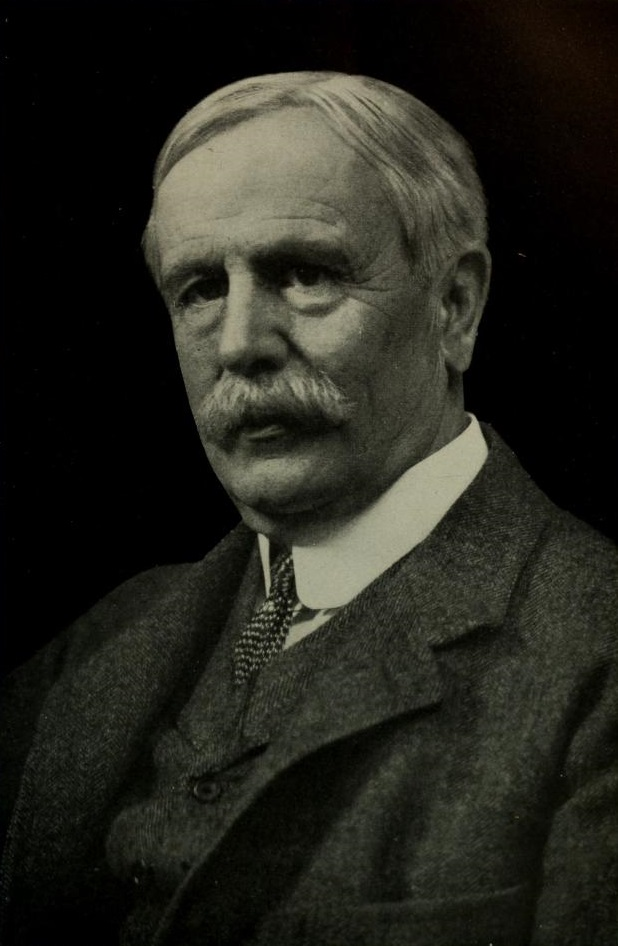
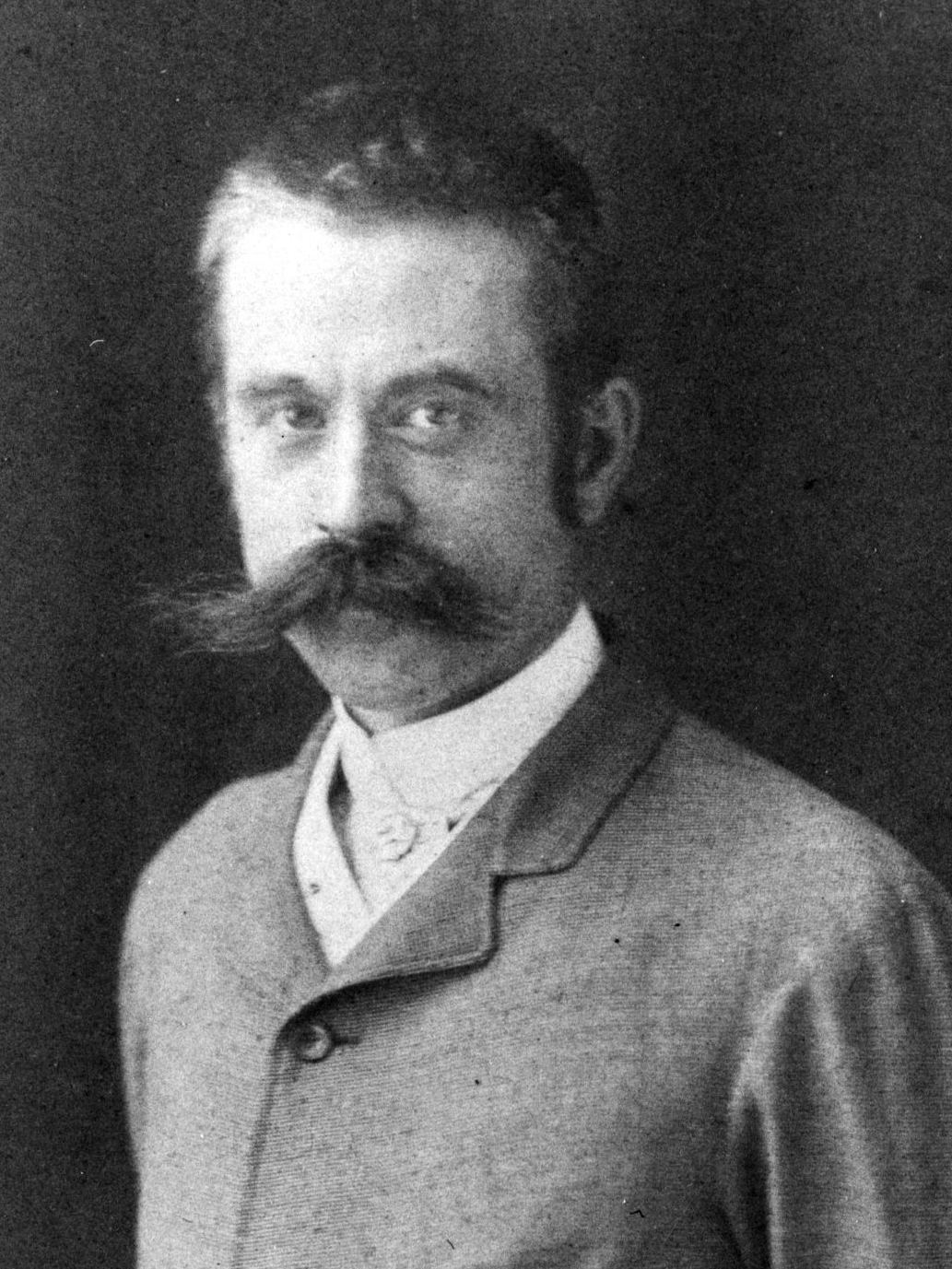
Charles Follen McKim, William Rutherford Mead, and Stanford White

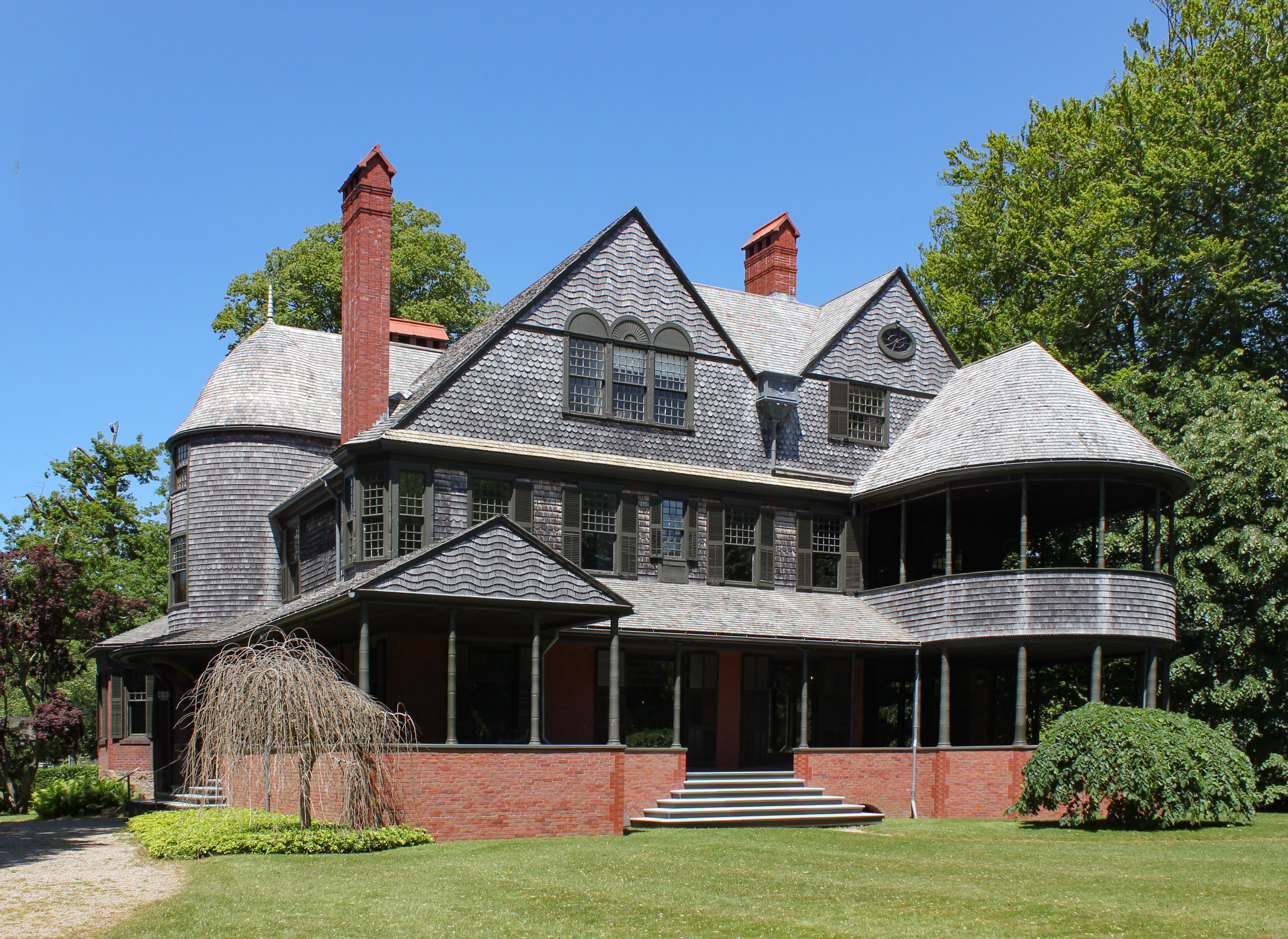
The Isaac Bell House, in Newport, Rhode Island

Charles McKim, who grew up in West Orange, New Jersey, was the son of a prominent Presbyterian abolitionist. He attended Harvard College and the École des Beaux-Arts in Paris, a leading training ground for American artists.

William Rutherford Mead, a cousin of president Rutherford B. Hayes, went to Amherst College and trained with Russell Sturgis in Boston. McKim and Mead formed a partnership with William Bigelow in New York City in 1877.

White was born in New York City, the son of Shakespearean scholar Richard Grant White and Alexina Black Mease (1830–1921). His father was a dandy and Anglophile with no money, but a great many connections in New York's art world, including painter John LaFarge, jeweler Louis Comfort Tiffany and landscape architect Frederick Law Olmsted.

White had no formal architectural training; he began his career at the age of 18 as the principal assistant to Henry Hobson Richardson, the most important American architect of the day and creator of a style recognized today as "Richardsonian Romanesque". He remained with Richardson for six years, playing a major role in the design of the William Watts Sherman House in Newport, Rhode Island, an important Shingle Style work.

White joined the partnership in 1879, and quickly became known as the artistic leader of the firm. McKim's connections helped secure early commissions, while Mead served as the managing partner. Their work applied the principles of Beaux-Arts architecture, with its classical design traditions and training in drawing and proportion, and the related City Beautiful movement after 1893. The designers quickly found wealthy and influential clients amidst the bustle and economic vigor of metropolitan New York.

=== Early developments ===
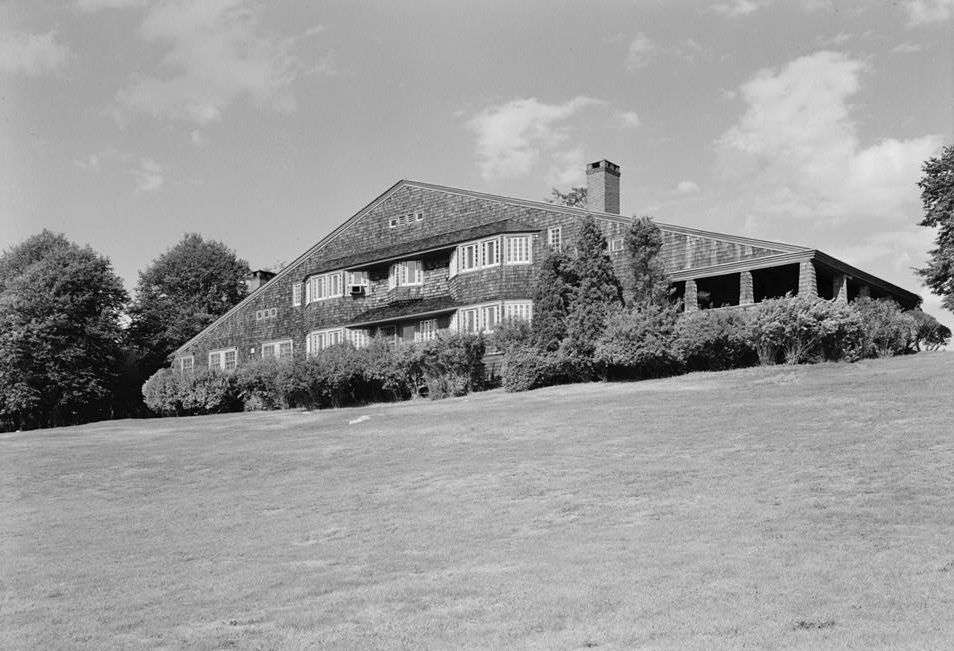
The William G. Low House, epitome of the Shingle Style

The firm initially distinguished itself with the innovative Shingle Style Newport Casino (1879–1880) and summer houses, including Victor Newcomb's house in Elberon, New Jersey (1880–1881), the Isaac Bell House in Newport, Rhode Island (1883), and Joseph Choate's house "Naumkeag" in Lenox, Massachusetts (1885–1888). Their status rose when McKim was asked to design the Boston Public Library in 1887, ensuring a new group of institutional clients following its successful completion in 1895. The firm had begun to use classical sources from Modern French, Renaissance and even Roman buildings as sources of inspiration for daring new work.

In 1877, White and McKim led their partners on a "sketching tour" of New England, visiting many of the key houses of Puritan leaders and early masterpieces of the colonial period. Their work began to incorporate influences from these buildings, contributing to the Colonial Revival.

The H.A.C. Taylor house in Newport, Rhode Island (1882–1886) was the first of their designs to use overt quotations from colonial buildings. A less successful but daring variation of a formal Georgian plan was White's house for Commodore William Edgar, also in Newport (1884–1886). Rather than traditional red brick or the pink pressed masonry of the Bell house, White tried a tawny, almost brown color, leaving the building neither fish nor fowl.

The William G. Low House in Bristol, Rhode Island (1886–1887), demolished in 1962, is today seen as a quintessential expression of the Shingle Style. The architectural historian Vincent Scully saw it as "at once a climax and a kind of conclusion" for McKim, since its "prototypal form ... was almost immediately to be abandoned for the more conventionally conceived columns and pediments of McKim, Mead, and White's later buildings."

The partners added talented designers and associates as the 1890s loomed, with Thomas Hastings, John Carrère, Henry Bacon and Joseph M. Wells on the payroll in their expanding office. With a larger staff, each partner had a studio of designers at his disposal, similar to the organization of a modern design firm, and this increased their capacity for doing even larger projects, including the design of entire college campuses for Columbia University and New York University, and a massive entertainment complex at Madison Square Garden, all located in New York City.

=== Major works ===
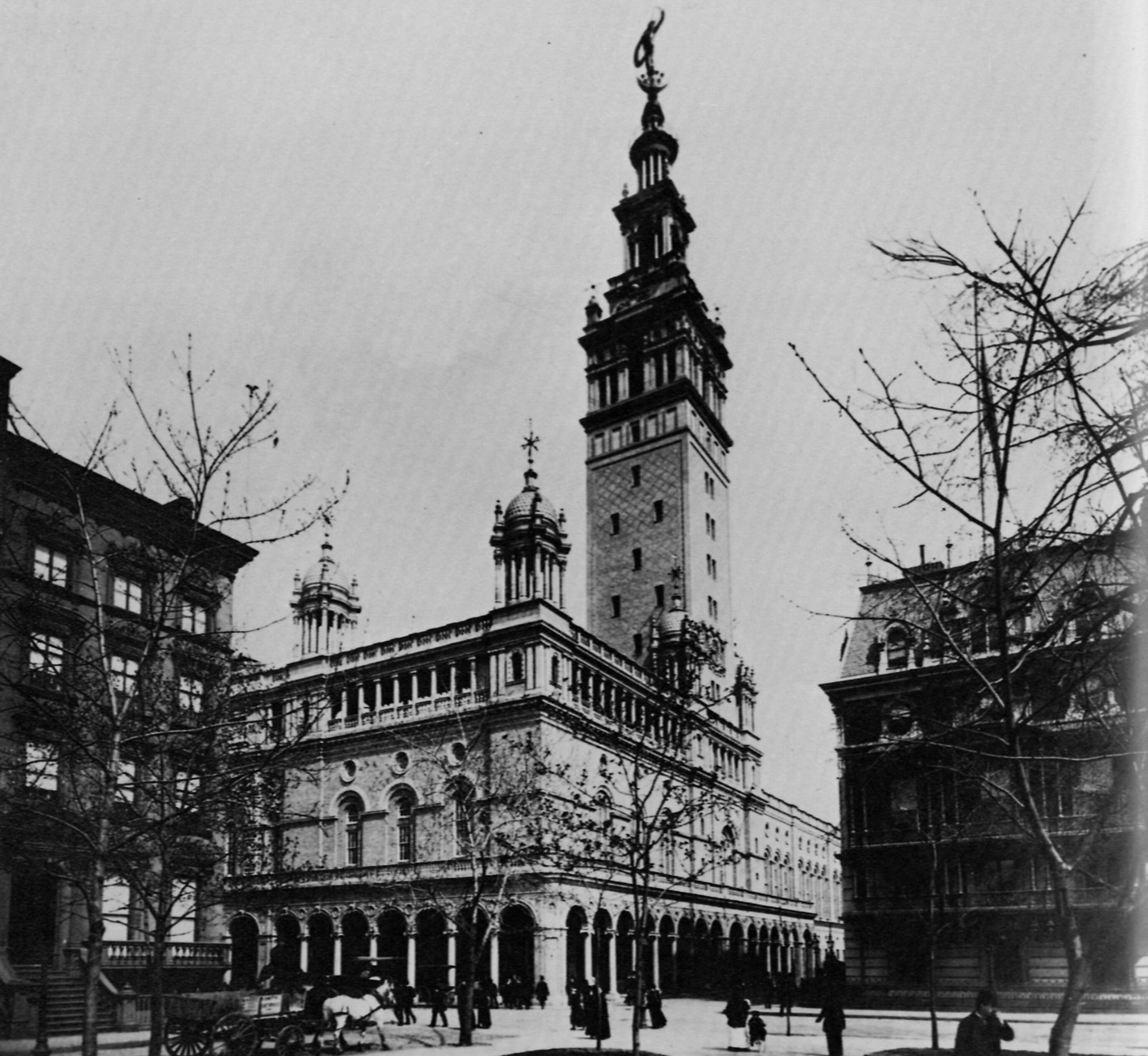
The original Madison Square Garden, built in 1890

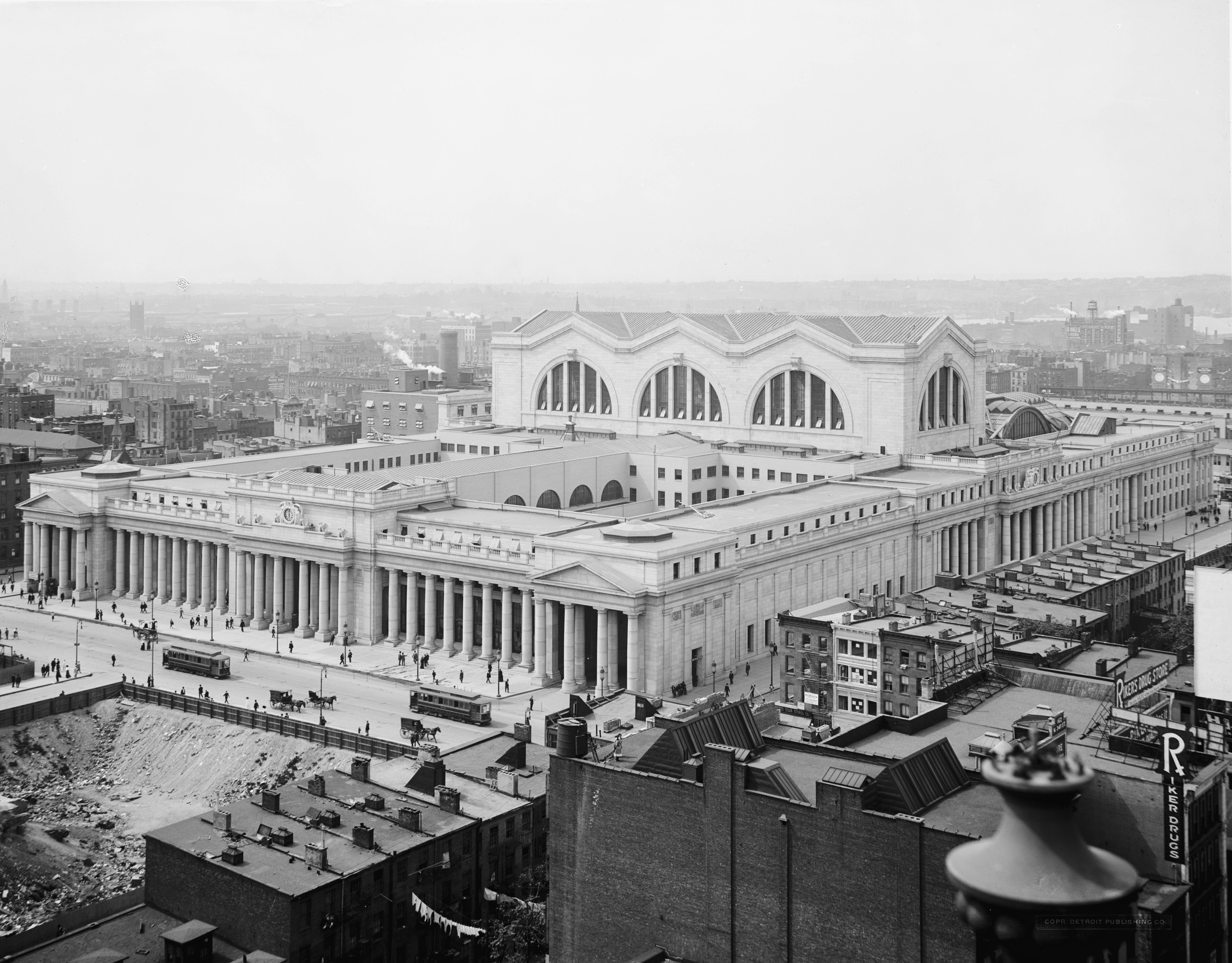
The original Penn Station in New York City, built between 1906 and 1910

McKim, Mead and White gained prominence as a cultural and artistic force through their construction of Madison Square Garden. White secured the job from the Vanderbilt family, and the other partners brought former clients into the project as investors. The extraordinary building opened its doors in 1890. What had once been a dilapidated arena for horse shows was now a multi-purpose entertainment palace, with a larger arena, a theater, apartments in a Spanish style tower, restaurants, and a roof garden with views both uptown and downtown from 34th Street. White's masterpiece was a testament to his creative imagination, and his taste for the pleasures of city life.

The architects paved the way for many subsequent colleagues by fraternizing with the rich in a number of other settings similar to The Garden, enhancing their social status during the Progressive Era. McKim, Mead and White designed not only the Century Association building (1891), but also many other clubs around Manhattan: the Colony Club, the Metropolitan Club, the Harmonie Club, and the University Club of New York.

Though White's subsequent life was plagued by scandals, and McKim's by depression and the loss of his second wife, the firm continued to produce magnificent and varied work in New York and abroad. They worked for the titans of industry, transportation and banking, designing not only classical buildings (the New York Herald Building, Morgan Library, Villard Houses, and Rhode Island State Capitol), but also planning factory towns (Echota, near Niagara Falls, New York; Roanoke Rapids, North Carolina; and Naugatuck, Connecticut), and working on university campuses (the University of Virginia, Harvard, Adelphi University and Columbia). The magnificent Low Library (1897) at Columbia was similar to Thomas Jefferson's at the University of Virginia, where White added an academic building on the other side of the Lawn.

Some of their later, classical country houses also enhanced their reputation with wealthy oligarchs and critics alike. The Frederick Vanderbilt Mansion (1895–1898) at Hyde Park, New York and White's "Rosecliff" for Tessie Oelrichs (1898–1902) in Newport were elegant venues for the society chronicled by Edith Wharton and Henry James. Newly wealthy Americans were seeking the right spouses for their sons and daughters, among them idle aristocrats from European families with dwindling financial resources. When called for, the firm could also deliver a house-full of continental antiques and works of art, many acquired by Stanford White from dealers abroad. Clarence Mackay's Harbor Hill (1899–1902), demolished in 1949, was probably the most opulent of these flights of fancy. Though many are gone, some now serve new uses, such as "Florham", in Madison, New Jersey (1897–1900), now the home of Fairleigh Dickinson University.

New York's City's enormous Penn Station (1906–1910) was the firm's crowning achievement, reflecting not only its commitment to new technological advances, but also to architectural history stretching back to Greek and Roman times. McKim, Mead & White also designed the General Post Office Building across from Penn Station at the same time, part of which became an above-ground expansion of Penn Station in 2021. The original Penn Station was demolished in 1963–1964 and replaced with a newer Madison Square Garden, in spite of large opposition to the move.

=== Later years ===
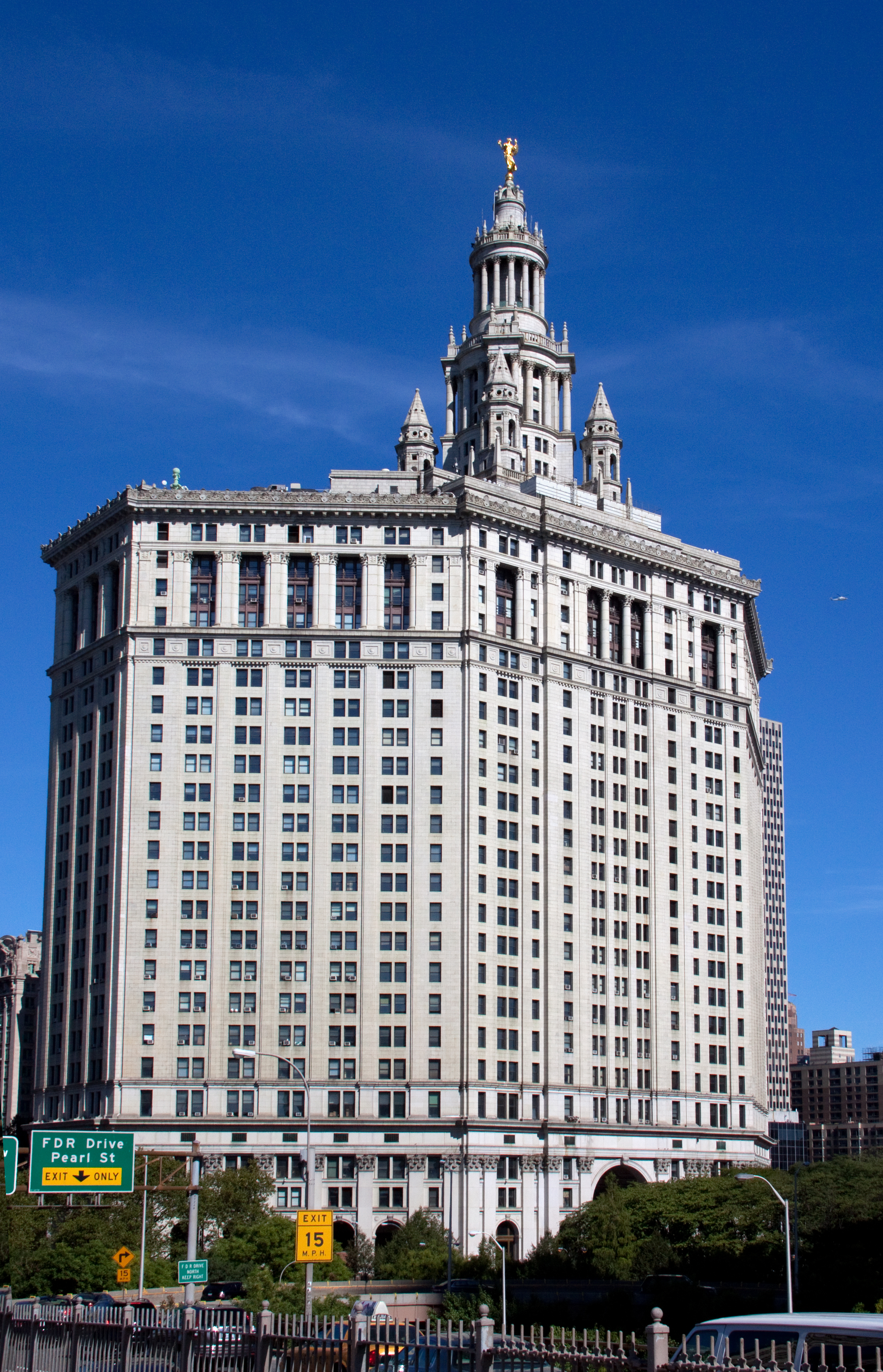
The Manhattan Municipal Building, designed principally by William M. Kendall and completed in 1915.

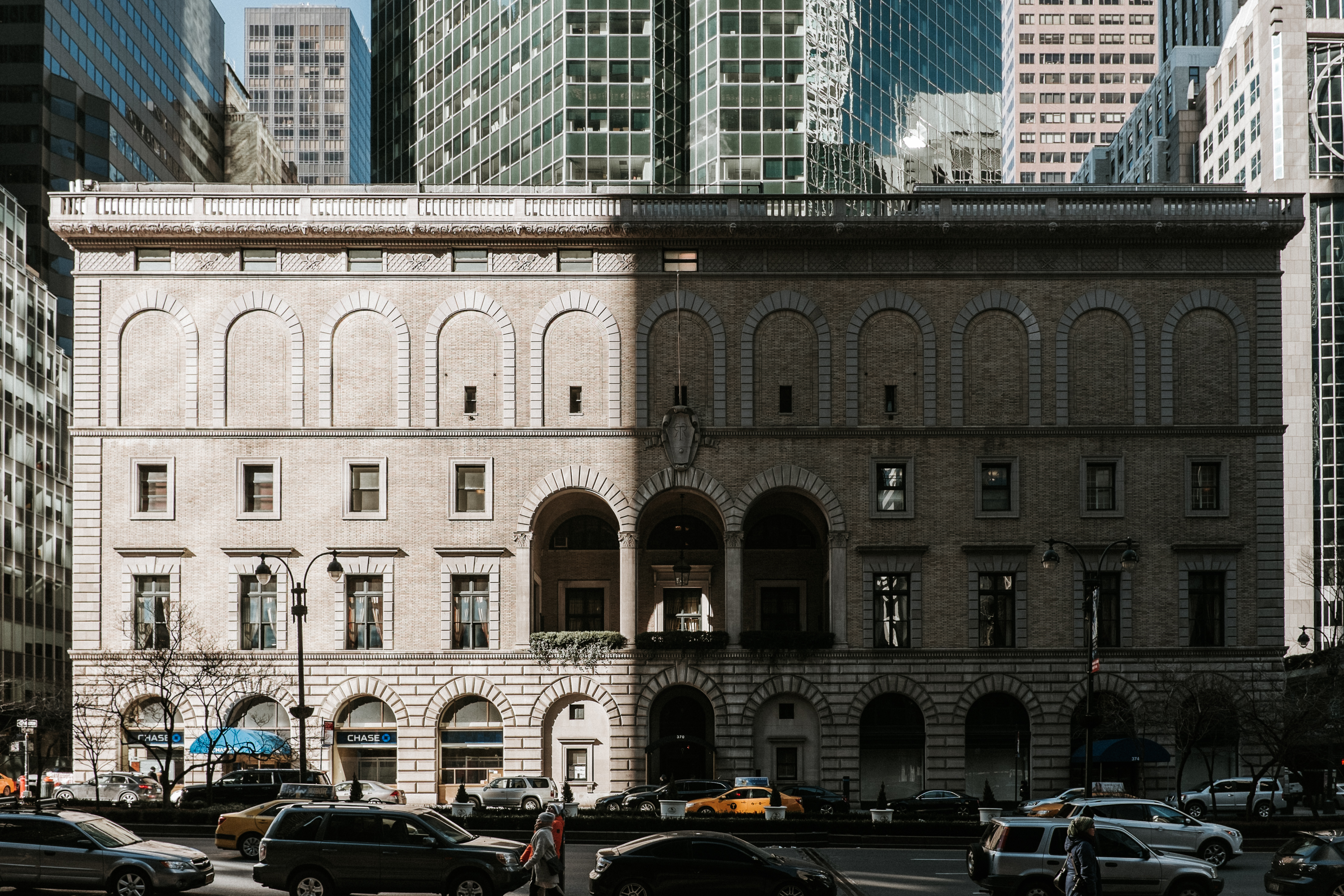
The Racquet and Tennis Club, designed principally by W. Symmes Richardson and completed in 1918.

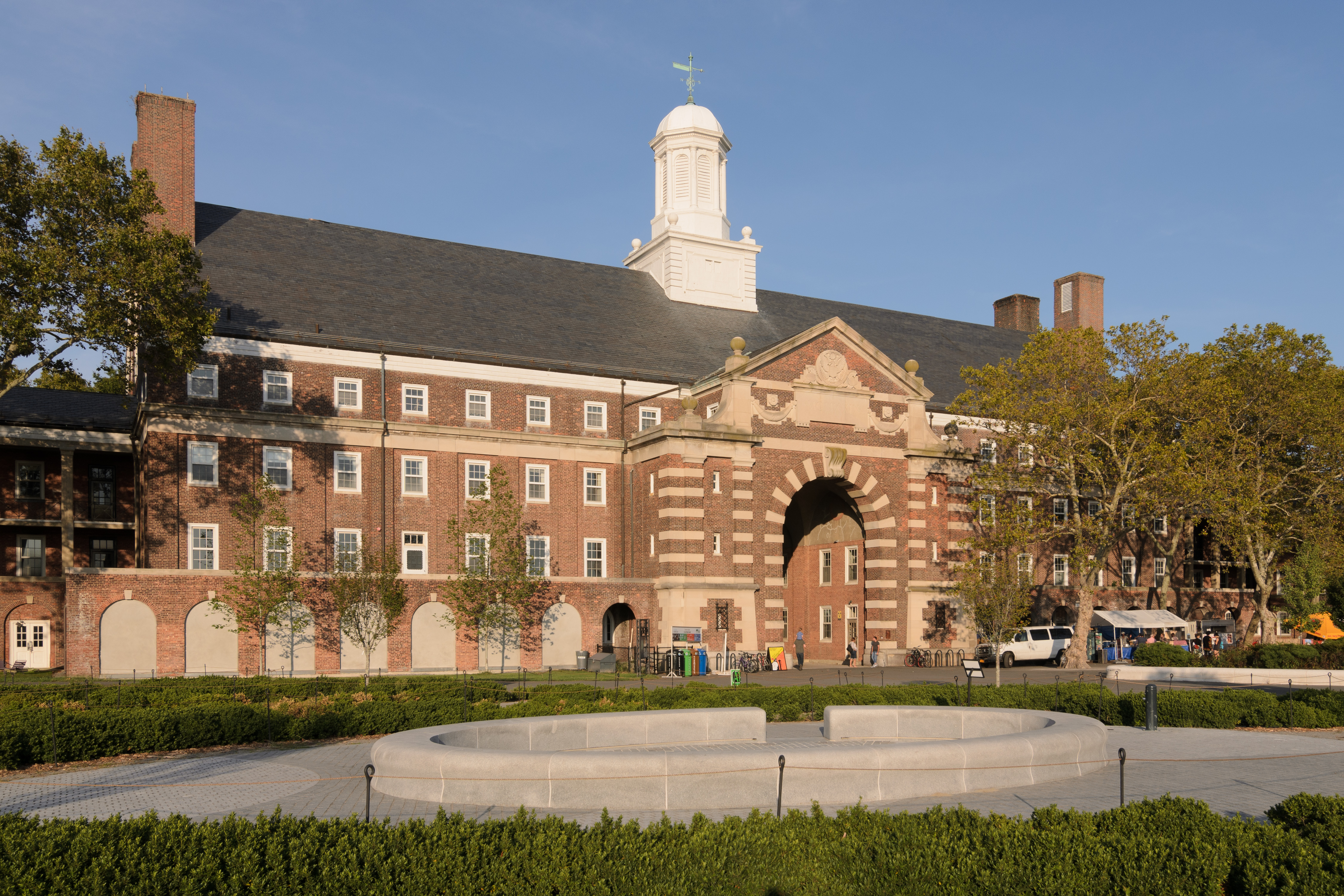
Liggett Hall on Governors Island, designed principally by Lawrence G. White and completed in 1929.

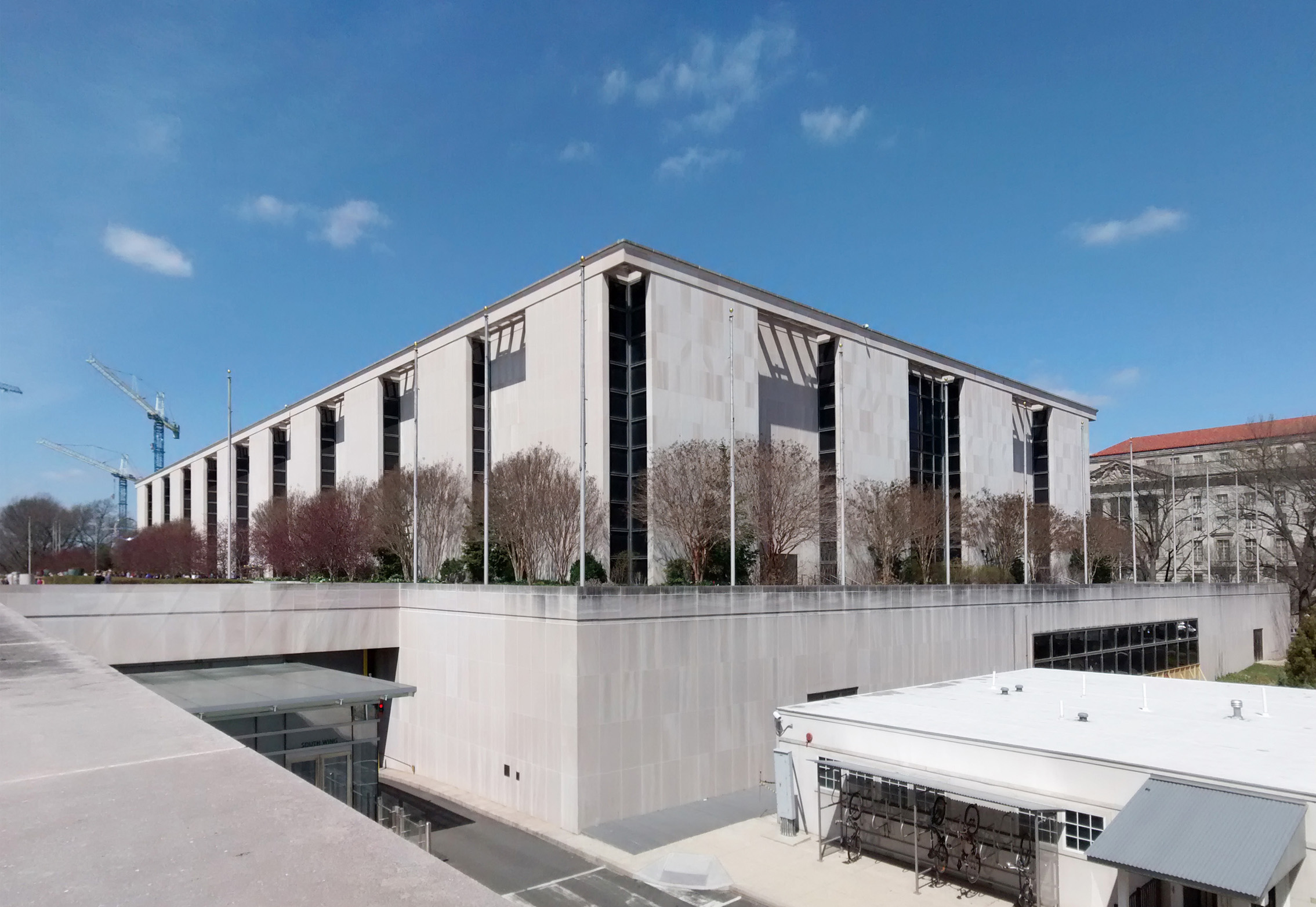
The National Museum of American History, initiated by Lawrence G. White, but designed principally by James K. Smith and Walker O. Cain, and completed in 1964.

In January 1906 the founders were joined by three additional partners: William Mitchell Kendall (1856–1941), Burt Leslie Fenner (1869–1926) and William Symmes Richardson (1873–1931). Each had worked as assistants to McKim, Mead and White, respectively, though they had been delegated executive responsibility for individual projects since 1904. After a 1907 invitation to participate in the competition to design the Manhattan Municipal Building (1915), the new partners reversed the firm's long-standing policy against participation in such competitions. Their entry, designed by Kendall, was successful, and the completed building was the firm's first serious entry into skyscraper design.

The firm retained its name long after the deaths of the founders. White was murdered in 1906, McKim died in 1909 and Mead retired in 1919. Kendall and Richardson divided most design responsibilities while Fenner took on the role of chief executive. Architectural historian Mosette Broderick described the design partners thusly: Kendall as "hardworking, dull and mean," Richardson as "the best designer of the three." This summation of Kendall's design skills is contradicted by his buildings, such as the Butler Institute of American Art (1919); his contemporaries considered him scholarly in the way that McKim had been. The recollections of employees such as Royal Cortissoz, however, confirm that his behavior towards his colleagues and subordinates could be actively malicious. Leland M. Roth identified the Racquet and Tennis Club (1918), designed by Richardson, as "the last and best work" of the decade following McKim and White's deaths. Richardson here combined Italian Renaissance precedents, such as the Florentine Palazzo Antinori, with modern functionalism. The final two partners, Lawrence Grant White (1887–1956)—Stanford White's son—and James Kellum Smith (1893–1961), were admitted to the partnership in 1920 and 1929, respectively. In its later years the firm maintained its commitment to quality materials and workmanship, but without its earlier creative abilities. In prior years the firm had been unfairly accused of being a "plan factory," a firm which executed generic, repetitive work as quickly as possible, but after about 1920 the comparison came to be seen as apt.

In 1914 the firm was approached by the Architectural Book Publishing Company with a proposal to publish a monograph of the firm's work. New drawings and photographs were prepared for the work, which was published in unbound, large folio installments from 1915 to 1920 as A Monograph of the Work of McKim, Mead & White, 1879–1915. With the exception of some important early works, this publication was focused on neoclassical works from the World's Columbian Exposition forward and served as a means for the later partners to curate their legacy. The Monograph also had a large influence on architects in the United States, England and elsewhere, for whom it served as a reference work. An abridged Student's Edition was published in 1925 and in 1952 they privately printed a more limited follow-up, Recent Work by the Present Partners of McKim, Mead & White, Architects. Both the Student's Edition and the unabridged Monograph have been reissued, the former by Classical America in 1981 and the latter by Dover Publications in 1990.

Richardson retired in 1921 after a disabling accident and Fenner died in 1926. Teunis Jacob van der Bent (1862–1936), a partner since 1909, took over Fenner's management role and died a decade later. Kendall gradually withdrew from the firm during the 1930s and died in 1941, leaving control of the firm with White and Smith. The firm's design efforts after World War II may be summed up by the Mead Art Building (1949) of Amherst College, a memorial to Mead. Mead and his wife had left a large sum of money to Amherst, his alma mater, for the construction of an art gallery. The new building was assigned to Smith, who was college architect and another alumnus. According to Blair Kamin, at this point Smith and his firm "were struggling with the challenge[s] posed by ... modernism," resulting in a building which attempts gamely to meld Beaux-Arts and modernist principles but fails at both. Shortly before White's death in 1956, he won for the firm the National Museum of American History (1964) in Washington, DC. His grandson, architect Samuel White, described the commission as "[h]is personal Mount Everest." The museum, among the final works initiated under the name McKim, Mead & White, was designed principally by Smith and Walker O. Cain. Here as at Amherst they attempted to meld traditionalism and modernism with little success. Martin Moeller, then curator of the National Building Museum, described it as "neither convincingly modern nor credibly neoclassical."

=== Successors ===
Smith, the last surviving partner, died in February 1961. The surviving associates, Milton Bode Steinmann (1899–1987), Alexander Stevenson Corrigill (1891–1961), Walker Oscar Cain (1915–1993) and Cornelius John White (1894–1962)–no relation to Stanford White–formed a new partnership under the name Steinmann, Corrigill, Cain & White. After the deaths of Corrigill and White shortly thereafter, the firm was reduced first to Steinmann, Cain & White and second to Steinmann & Cain. Steinmann retired in 1967 and the firm continued under the leadership of Cain as Walker O. Cain & Associates. In 1978 the firm was reorganized as Cain, Farrell & Bell to include two new partners, including Byron Bell. In the 1990s Bell changed the name of the firm first to Bell Larson and second to Bell Larson Raucher, acknowledging the contributions of partners Douglas Larson and Alice Raucher. At the turn of the millennium Bell downplayed his firm's relation to its now-distant origins, observing that "[i]t's a different time. That was a giant firm, a major force in the world. Our firm has 10 people." A late work of the firm is Peterson Hall (1999) of the Council on Foreign Relations, a New Classical townhouse on East 68th Street in Manhattan. The firm was later renamed Bell Donnelly and lastly to Byron Bell Architects and Planners in 2012.

== Selected works ==
=== New York City ===
Building	Location	Year	Features	Image
Villard Houses	Manhattan	1884	for Henry Villard, Renaissance Revival	
169 West 83rd Street	Manhattan	1885	for David H. King Jr, Romanesque revival	
Robb House; 23 Park Avenue	Manhattan	1888–1892	for J. Hampden Robb, Italian Renaissance revival style	
Madison Square Garden II	Manhattan	1890	second of four buildings known by this name; razed in 1925	
Century Club	Manhattan	1891		
Cable Building	Manhattan	1893		
Washington Arch, Washington Square Park	Manhattan	1892		
Metropolitan Club	Manhattan	1893		
Harvard Club of New York City	Midtown Manhattan	1894		
New York Herald Building	Manhattan	1895	razed in 1921	
Brooklyn Museum	Brooklyn	1895		
Bowery Savings Bank Building	Manhattan	1895		
900 Broadway	Manhattan	1897		
Former New York Life Insurance Company Building	Manhattan	1894–1898	White marble Renaissance palazzo-style building. MMW took over the commission upon the death of Stephen D. Hatch in 1894.	
James J. Goodwin Residence	Manhattan	1896–1898		
University Club of New York	Manhattan	1899		
University Heights campus, New York University	The Bronx	1891–1900	including Hall of Fame for Great Americans and Gould Memorial Library 1900, now site of Bronx Community College	
Morningside Heights campus, Columbia University	Manhattan	1893–1900	general design and individual buildings including Low Memorial Library, Philosophy Hall, John Jay Hall, Avery Hall, Hamilton Hall, Kent Hall, Hartley Hall, Havemeyer Hall, Schermerhorn Hall, Pupin Hall, Earl Hall, Wallach Hall, St. Paul's Chapel, and Casa Italiana.	
Prospect Park	Brooklyn	1895–1900	Various features including Parade Place on Lookout Hill, Peristyle, Park Circle granite fixtures, Lullwater Bridge, 1895 Maryland Monument on Lookout Hill	
William H. Moore House	Manhattan	1898–1900		
Harry B. Hollins Residence	Manhattan	1899–1901		
Morgan Library & Museum	Manhattan	1903	expanded in 1928	
IRT Powerhouse	Manhattan	1904		
Harmonie Club	Manhattan	1905		
390 Fifth Avenue	Manhattan	1906	for the Gorham Manufacturing Company	
1 West 28th Street	NoMad	1907	former estate of Gilded Age socialite Charlotte Goodridge demolished and reconstructed into five-story bank designed by McKim, Mead & White, commissioned by Second National Bank.	
Prison Ship Martyrs' Monument	Brooklyn	1908		
Knickerbocker Trust Building	Manhattan	1909	for the Knickerbocker Trust Company; now razed	
Pennsylvania Station	Manhattan	1904–1910	above-ground portion razed in 1963	
998 Fifth Avenue	Manhattan	1912		
Bellevue Hospital Center	Manhattan	1912	general design and some individual buildings including R & S Building	
New York Public Library branches	Manhattan and The Bronx	1902–1914	designed 11 branches including Hamilton Grange Branch 1905–1906, 115th Street Branch 1907–1908	
James A. Farley Building	Manhattan	1911–1914	designed as the architectural twin of New York City's Pennsylvania Station; annex also designed by McKim, Mead & White in 1932. Now contains Moynihan Train Hall	
Manhattan Municipal Building	Manhattan	1909–1915		
Racquet and Tennis Club	Manhattan	1916–1918		
Hotel Pennsylvania	Manhattan	1919	razed in 2022	
Town Hall	Manhattan	1921		
American Academy of Arts and Letters Main Building	Manhattan	1923	Part of Audubon Terrace, a New York City designated landmark	
110 Livingston Street	Brooklyn	1926	former Elks Lodge, former headquarters of New York City Department of Education	
Savoy-Plaza Hotel	Manhattan	1927	razed in 1965	the large building at center, to the right of the taller, narrow spire
Liggett Hall, Governors Island	Manhattan	1929		
Bronx Grit Chamber	The Bronx	1936–1937	sewage plant protected as a New York City designated landmark	
DeKalb Hall and Information Science Center	Brooklyn	1955		
North Hall at Pratt Institute	Brooklyn	1957		

=== New England, Upstate New York, and Long Island ===
Building	Location	Year	Features	Image
Newport Casino	Newport, Rhode Island	1880		
John Howard Whittemore House	Naugatuck, Connecticut	1880s		
Isaac Bell House	Newport, Rhode Island	1881–1883		
Cyrus McCormick summer estate, shingle-style	Richfield Springs, New York	1882	razed 1957	
Emdalar Castle – Tickner Estate	South Kingstown, Rhode Island	1883	Restored to its original condition in 2014.	
Narragansett Pier Casino	Narragansett, Rhode Island	1883		
Narragansett Pier Life Saving Station	Narragansett, Rhode Island	1888	Coast Guard House Restaurant since 1960s	
Salem School	Naugatuck, Connecticut	1884		about 1905
Wolf's Head Society, "Old Hall", Yale University	New Haven, Connecticut	1884		
Charles J. Osborn Residence	Mamaroneck, New York	1885	Mamaroneck Beach and Yacht Club since 1952	
"Four Chimneys" Mansion	New Rochelle, New York	?		
John F. Andrew Mansion, 32 Hereford Street	Boston, Massachusetts	1886		
William G. Low House	Bristol, Rhode Island	1887	epitome of Shingle Style architecture; razed 1962	
Algonquin Club	Boston, Massachusetts	1888		
Johnston Gate, Harvard University	Cambridge, Massachusetts	1889		
Fayerweather Hall, Amherst College	Amherst, Massachusetts	1890	Renaissance Revival style; "Amherst's best building"	
Walker Art Building, Bowdoin College	Brunswick, Maine	1894		
Whittemore Memorial Library	Naugatuck, Connecticut	1894		
Adams Power Plant Transformer House	Niagara Falls, New York	1895		
Boston Public Library	Boston, Massachusetts	1895		
Dudley Pickman House, 303 Commonwealth Avenue (Back Bay)	Boston, Massachusetts	1895		
Reid Hall, Manhattanville College	Purchase, New York	1895		
Rhode Island State House	Providence, Rhode Island	1895–1904		
Garden City Hotel	Garden City, New York	1895	burned 1899	
House for Frederick Vanderbilt, "Hyde Park"	Hyde Park, New York	1895–1898		
Woodlea	Briarcliff Manor, New York	1895	now Sleepy Hollow Country Club	
James L. Breese House	Southampton, New York	1897–1906		
Rosecliff	Newport, Rhode Island	1898–1902		
Harbor Hill	Long Island, New York	1899–1902	razed 1947	
Symphony Hall	Boston, Massachusetts	1900		
Hill-Stead Museum	Farmington, Connecticut	1901	estate of Alfred Atmore Pope, designed with Theodate Pope Riddle	
Astor Courts	Rhinebeck, New York	1902–1904	estate of John Jacob Astor	
Rockefeller Hall, Brown University	Providence, Rhode Island	1904	now Faunce House	
Naugatuck High School	Naugatuck, Connecticut	1904	Hillside Middle School since 1959	
New England Trust Company Building	Boston, Massachusetts	1906		
Waterbury Union Station	Waterbury, Connecticut	1909	Renaissance Revival style featuring a clock tower modeled on the Torre del Mangia in Siena, Italy	
Plymouth Rock portico	Plymouth, Massachusetts	1920		
Foster Hall, University at Buffalo South Campus	Buffalo, New York	1921		
Harvard Business School	Boston, Massachusetts	1925		
Ira Allen Chapel, University of Vermont	Burlington, Vermont	1925		
Olin Memorial Library, Wesleyan University	Middletown, Connecticut	1925		
Memorial Chapel, Union College	Schenectady, New York	1925		
Lincoln Alliance Building	Rochester, New York	1926		
Rochester Savings Bank	Rochester, New York	1927		
George Eastman House	Rochester, New York	c.1903	Eastman hired McKim, Mead & White to design the interior of his Georgian Colonial Revival Mansion which was nearly an exact, large scale duplicate of the Robert Root House that was built by the firm in Buffalo, New York c.1894	
Burlington City Hall	Burlington, Vermont	1928		
Levermore Hall, Blodgett Hall, and Woodruff Hall, Adelphi University	Garden City, New York	1929		
Schenectady City Hall	Schenectady, New York	1931–1933		
The Little Red Schoolhouse, Amherst College	Amherst, Massachusetts	1937	razed May 2016	
Ballou Hall, Tufts College	Medford, Massachusetts	1955	Renovation	
Housatonic Railroad Station	Stockbridge, Massachusetts	1893	English Gothic Revival style, stone	
New York Central Railroad Station	Ardsley-on-Hudson, New York	1895	Shingle Style with Tudor and Romanesque Revival elements	
Park Lane Apartments	Mount Vernon, New York	1929		
The Cedars/Lord's Castle Remodel	Piermont, New York	1892	"The original gable ends were stepped, the pointy 'Gothick' windows were Edwardianized, the wooden porches reconstructed in stone, the tower on the west capped with a conical roof, the forest of delicate chimney pots combined and bulked up, and the reconfigured interior given heavy doses of classical columns, balusters, dadoes, fireplaces and moldings."	
Mead Art Museum, Amherst College	Amherst, Massachusettes	1949	By James Kellum Smith of Mckim, Mead, & White	
Chapin Hall, Amherst College	Amherst, Massachusettes	1958	The design was so hated that it sparked protests on campus before construction even began.	
Webster Hall, Amherst College	Amherst, Massachusettes	1909		
Moore Hall, Amherst College	Amherst, Massachusettes	1929	Classical Revival	
Valentine Hall, Amherst College	Amherst, Massachusettes	1941	"Budget Georgian Revival"	
Morrow Hall, Amherst College	Amherst, Massachusettes	1926		
Converse Hall, Amherst College	Amherst, Massachusettes	1917	Beaux-Arts	

=== New Jersey ===
Building	Location	Year	Features	Image
Florham Campus, Fairleigh Dickinson University	Madison and Florham Park, New Jersey	1897	originally "Florham," the estate of Hamilton Twombly and Florence Vanderbilt, one of many Vanderbilt houses	
Orange Public Library	Orange, New Jersey	1901		
St. Peter's Episcopal Church	Morristown, New Jersey	1889–1913	English-medieval style parish church.	
Hurstmont	Morristown, New Jersey	1902–1903	Private estate	
FitzRandolph Gate	Princeton, New Jersey	1905	The official entrance of Princeton University	
University Cottage Club, Princeton University	Princeton, New Jersey	1906	One of the Eating clubs at Princeton University	
Pennsylvania Station	Newark, New Jersey	1935	Art Deco style	

=== Washington, D.C. ===
Building	Location	Year	Features	Image
White House, West Wing and East Wing	1600 Pennsylvania Avenue NW	1903	Renovation	West wing c. 1909
Thomas Nelson Page House	1759 R Street NW	1897		
Roosevelt Hall, National War College	Fort Lesley J. McNair	1903–1907		
National Museum of American History	1300 Constitution Avenue NW	1964		
Patterson Mansion	15 Dupont Circle NW	1903		
St. John's Episcopal Church, Lafayette Square	1525 H Street NW	1919	Renovation	
Pedestal, Jeanne d'Arc	Meridian Hill Park	1922	Measures about 10 feet (3.0 m) long and 6 feet (1.8 m) high	

=== Other U.S. locations ===
Building	Location	Year	Features	Image
Ross Winans Mansion	Baltimore, Maryland	1882	Possibly the only fully intact late-nineteenth-century urban mansions designed almost exclusively by MM&K. Also one of their first residential homes.	
First Methodist Episcopal Church, Lovely Lane United Methodist Church	Baltimore, Maryland	1884		
Cramond	Tredyffrin Township, Pennsylvania	1886		
McKelvy House (formerly "Oakhurst"), Lafayette College, College Hill	Easton, Pennsylvania	1888		
New York Life Insurance Building	Kansas City, Missouri	1890		
Open Gates, George Sealy Mansion	Galveston, Texas	1891		
Germantown Cricket Club	Philadelphia, Pennsylvania	1891		
The Agricultural Building at the World Columbian Exposition	Chicago, Illinois	1893		
Old Cabell Hall, Cocke Hall, and Rouss Hall, University of Virginia	Charlottesville, Virginia	c. 1898	Part of the UNESCO World Heritage Site at Monticello and the University of Virginia	
Savoyard Centre	Detroit, Michigan	1900	Originally State Savings Bank; National Register of Historic Places, 1982	
Protection of the Flag Monument	Athens, Pennsylvania	1900–1902		
English Building, University of Illinois Urbana-Champaign	Urbana, Illinois	1905		
Carr's Hill, or University of Virginia President's House	Charlottesville, Virginia	1906		
Omaha National Bank Building	Omaha, Nebraska	1906	originally the New York Life Building, 1889)	
Girard Bank	Philadelphia, Pennsylvania	1908		
Fayette National Bank Building	Lexington, Kentucky	1914	now 21c Museum Hotel Lexington	
Minneapolis Institute of Arts	Minneapolis, Minnesota	1915		
Peabody Demonstration School	Nashville, Tennessee	1915	now University School of Nashville	
National McKinley Birthplace Memorial Library and Museum	Niles, Ohio	1915		
Butler Institute of American Art	Youngstown, Ohio	1919	listed on National Register of Historic Places	
Cohen Memorial Hall (Vanderbilt Fine Arts Gallery), Vanderbilt University	Nashville, Tennessee	1928 approx		
Milwaukee County Courthouse	Milwaukee, Wisconsin	1931		
Chittenden Hall, University of Vermont	Burlington, Vermont	1947		
Dietrich Hall, now Steinberg-Dietrich Hall, University of Pennsylvania	Philadelphia, Pennsylvania	1952		
University of North Carolina, Chapel Hill	Chapel Hill, North Carolina	1929	Expansion of campus	

=== Other countries ===
Building	Location	Year	Features	Image
Bank of Montreal Head Office	Montreal, Quebec, Canada	1901–1905	additions	
Bank of Montreal Building	Winnipeg, Manitoba, Canada	1913		
Mount Royal Club	Montreal, Quebec, Canada	1906		
American Academy in Rome Main Building	Rome, Italy	1914		
Hotel Nacional de Cuba	Havana, Cuba	1930		

== Notable architects who worked for McKim, Mead & White ==
- Henry Bacon – worked at the firm from about 1886 through 1897; left with fellow employee James Brite to open their own office.
- William A. Boring – worked at the firm in 1890 before forming a separate partnership with Edward Lippincott Tilton.
- Charles Lewis Bowman – a draftsman at the firm until 1922, noted for his large number of private residences throughout Westchester County, New York including Bronxville, Pelham Manor, Mamaroneck and New Rochelle.
- A. Page Brown – worked with the firm beginning in the 1880s; went to California, where he was known for the San Francisco Ferry Building.
- Walker O. Cain – worked at the firm; he took it over in 1961 and renamed it several times.
- J.E.R. Carpenter – worked at the firm for several years before designing much of upper Fifth and Park Avenues, including 907 Fifth Avenue, 825 Fifth Avenue, 625 Park Avenue, 550 Park Avenue and the Lincoln Building on 42nd Street.
- John Merven Carrère (1858–1911) – worked with McKim, Mead & White from 1883 through 1885, then joined Thomas Hastings to form the firm Carrère and Hastings.
- Thomas Harlan Ellett (1880–1951)
- Cass Gilbert – worked with the firm until 1882, when he went to work with James Knox Taylor; later designed many notable structures, among them the George Washington Bridge and the Woolworth Building.
- Arthur Loomis Harmon – later of Shreve, Lamb and Harmon.
- Thomas Hastings (1860–1929) – of Carrère and Hastings, worked with McKim, Mead & White from 1883 through 1885.
- John Galen Howard (1864–1931)
- John Mead Howells (1868–1959)
- William Mitchell Kendall (1856–1941) – worked with the firm from 1882 until his death.
- Harrie T. Lindeberg – started at the firm in 1895 as an assistant to Stanford White and remained with the firm until White's death in 1906.
- Austin W. Lord – worked with the firm in 1890–1894 on designs for Brooklyn Museum of Arts and Sciences, the Metropolitan Club and buildings at Columbia University
- Harold Van Buren Magonigle (1867–1935)
- Albert Randolph Ross
- Philip Sawyer (1868–1949)
- James Kellum Smith (1893–1961) – a member of the firm from 1924 to 1961; full partner in 1929, and the last surviving partner of MM&W. He primarily designed academic buildings, but his last major work was the National Museum of American History.
- Robert Storer Stephenson (1858–1929) — began his career at the firm and in 1882 went on to found Stephenson & Wheeler, which designed the mansion at Edgerton Park and the Brewster Building, among many others.
- Egerton Swartwout of Tracy and Swartwout – both Tracy and Swartwout worked together for the firm on multiple projects prior to starting their own practice.
- Edward Lippincott Tilton – helped design the Boston Public Library in 1890 before leaving with Boring.
- Robert von Ezdorf – took over much of the firm's business after White's death.
- Joseph Morrill Wells (1853–1890) – worked as firm's first Chief Draftsman from 1879 to 1890; often considered to be the firm's "fourth partner", and largely responsible for its Renaissance Revival designs in the 1880s.
- William M. Whidden – worked at the firm from at least 1882 until 1888; projects included the Tacoma and Portland hotels in Washington and Oregon, respectively; moved to Portland, Oregon, in 1888 to finish the hotel and established his own firm with Ion Lewis
- York and Sawyer – Edward York (1863–1928) and Philip Sawyer (1868–1949) worked together for the firm before starting their own partnership in 1898.
