= English Building (University of Illinois Urbana-Champaign) =

Academic building

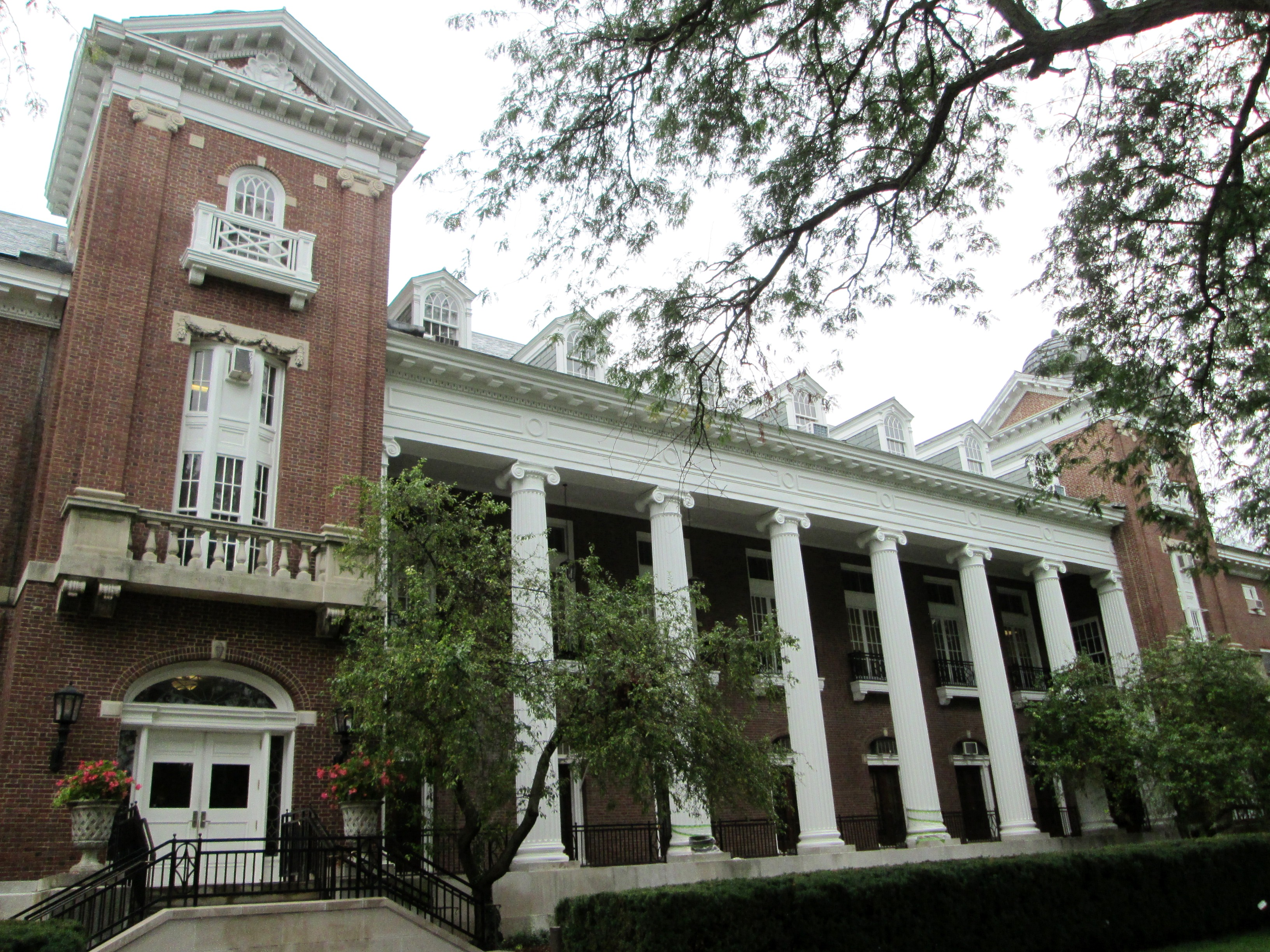
- English Building from the Main Quad
- Interactive map of the English Building area
- Former names: Woman's Building; Bevier Hall

General information
- Architectural style: Georgian Revival; Beaux-Arts
- Location: 608 South Wright Street, Urbana, Illinois, U.S.
- Coordinates: 40.1076°N 88.2282°W
- Current tenants: College of Liberal Arts & Sciences
- Inaugurated: October 16, 1905
- Owner: University of Illinois

Technical details
- Floor count: 4

Design and construction
- Architects: McKim, Mead & White; W. C. Zimmerman (1913); James M. White (1924)

The English Building, previously known as the Woman's Building and Bevier Hall, is a historic structure on the campus of the University of Illinois Urbana-Champaign. It is located on the west side of the Main Quad between Lincoln Hall and the Henry Administration Building. The original portion of the English Building, designed by McKim, Mead & White, was completed in 1905 and expanded in 1913 and 1924. The distinctive columned front, which faces the Main Quad, dates to the 1913 addition. Since 1956, the English Building has been home to the university's Department of English.

== History ==
=== Until 1940 ===
The English Building, originally known as the Woman's Building, was dedicated on October 16, 1905. The dedication doubled as the installation ceremony for incoming University of Illinois president Edmund Janes James. The original portion of the building, with a central mass along Wright Street and two side wings, was designed in the Georgian Revival style by prominent architectural firm McKim, Mead & White. The firm had previously designed academic buildings at institutions including Columbia University, University of Virginia, and the University Heights campus of New York University.

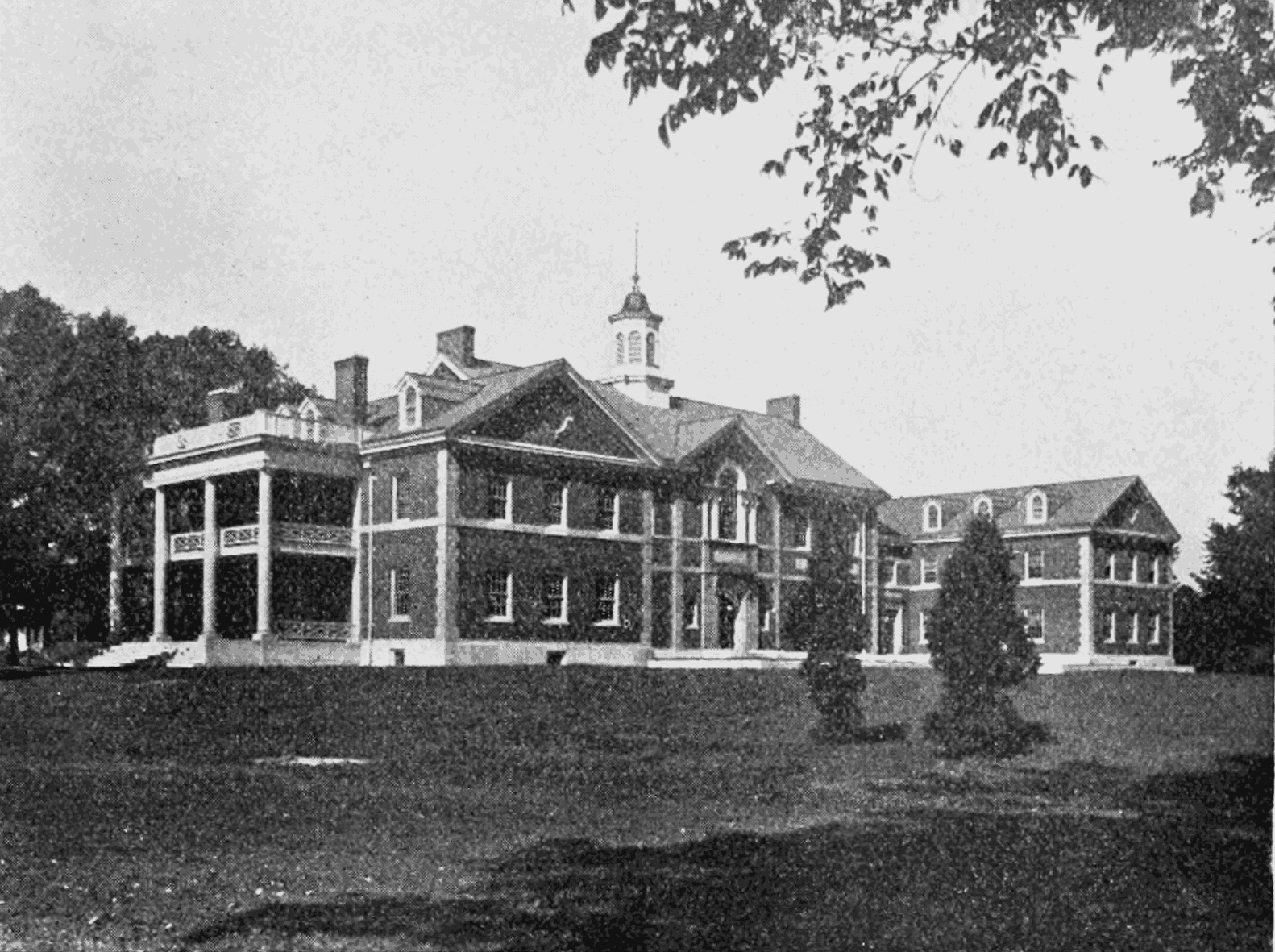
The Woman's Building in 1905

Originally, the north wing of the Woman's Building was home to the Household Science Department (later called the Department of Home Economics). The north wing included classrooms, test kitchens, and a chemical laboratory. The south wing was primarily social spaces for female students, along with offices for the Dean of Women. The building's central mass had a pool and locker rooms on the first floor; the second floor was a gymnasium with a balcony over its south end. The Woman's Building was intended to be a "safe space" for women at the university; men were not initially allowed inside, although this policy gradually loosened.

Contrary to popular belief, the building never served as a residence hall. The first campus residence hall for female students was Busey Hall, which was completed in 1917. Before Busey Hall, female students typically lived in sorority houses, boarding houses, or private homes. Religious groups stepped in to fill the housing shortage as early as 1909, when the Episcopalians built a church-affiliated residence hall that could house thirty women. This facility, known as Osborne Hall, was located across Wright Street from the Woman's Building; since 1919, it has served as the Chi Omega sorority house.

The Woman's Building was expanded in 1913 to designs by W. C. Zimmerman. A group of university women helmed by Nora Dunlap (wife of Henry M. Dunlap) successfully lobbied the state for the project's funding. The 1913 addition included the three-story Neoclassical colonnade that faces the Main Quad. In 1924, the building was again expanded, this time to designs by university professor James M. White. White had been the construction supervisor for the original portion of the building.

=== After 1940 ===
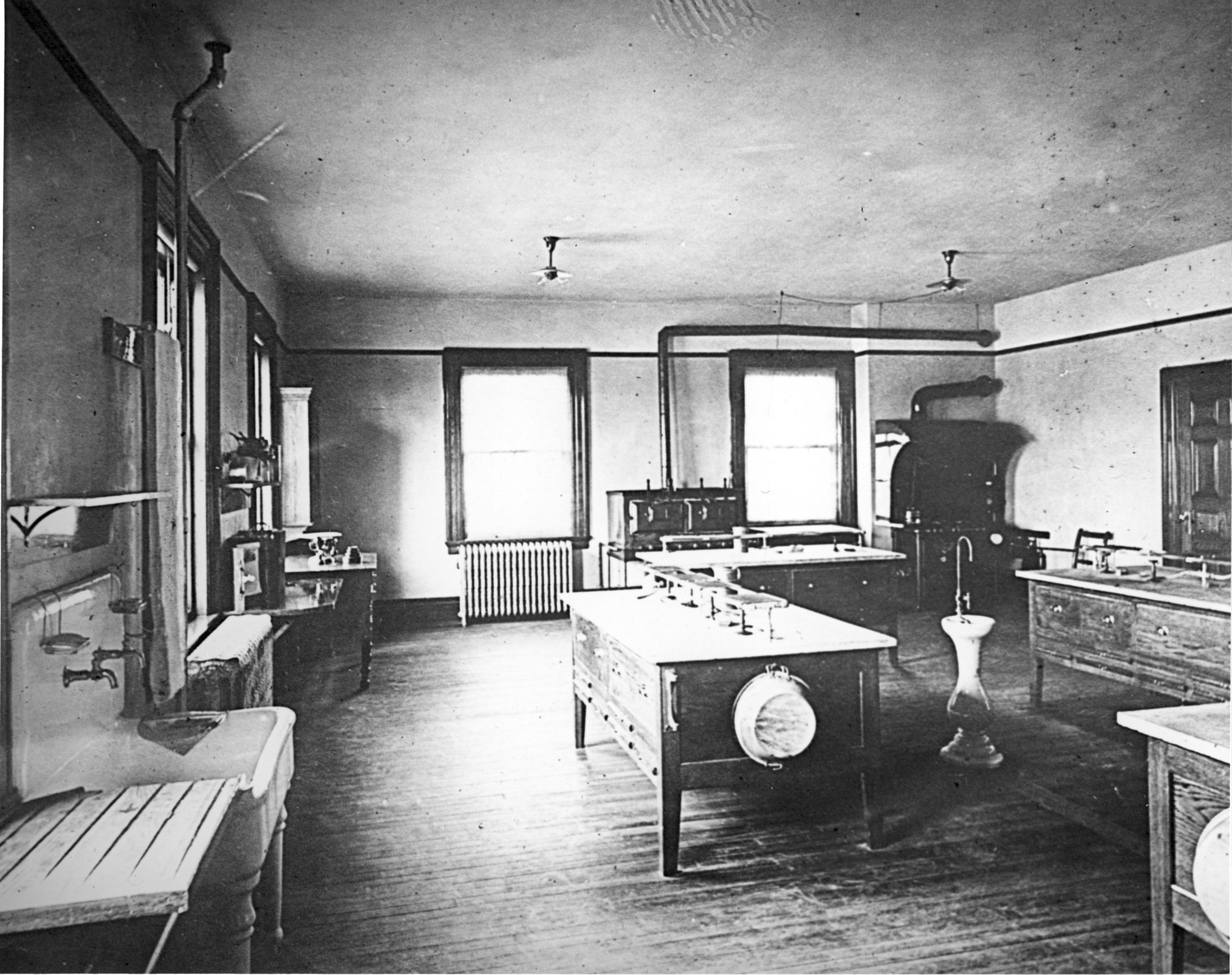
Home economics laboratory in the Woman's Building, c. 1910

The Department of Physical Education for Women began in the Woman's Building, but it had moved to other campus locations prior to World War II. However, in 1942, the department was displaced from its existing facilities by the Naval Training School for Signalmen and the Navy's Diesel Engine Operator's School. At that time, the Woman's Building was occupied primarily by the Department of Home Economics. To move the entire Department of Physical Education for Women back into the Woman's Building (which still had a pool and gymnasium), parts of the Department of Home Economics were relocated to the former Davenport House on Wright Street. During this era, the pool in the Woman's Building was reserved for the training of Navy and Army trainees six mornings per week; female students could only swim in the pool during afternoons and evenings.

The Woman's Building was renamed Bevier Hall in 1947 to honor Isabel Bevier, a longtime member of the university faculty. Bevier, who was a pioneer in the home economics field, led the Department of Home Economics from 1901 to 1921. However, a decade later, the department moved to a new Bevier Hall on the east side of campus. After the Department of English moved into the former Woman's Building in 1956, the structure was given its current name: the English Building.

The English Building's slate roof was replaced with identical materials in 2019. At the same time, the cupola and entablature were repaired, attic insulation was installed, and certain windows and chimneys were replaced. The contracted architectural firm, Bailey Edward, won a Heritage Award from the Preservation and Conservation Association of Champaign Country (PACA) for its work on the project.

=== Paranormal events ===
According to campus legend, the English Building is haunted by the ghost of a female student who drowned in the building's pool. Students using the building have reported mysterious phenomena such as doors opening or closing on their own, loudly-creaking floors, and the faint voice of a woman sounding from nowhere.

== Architecture ==
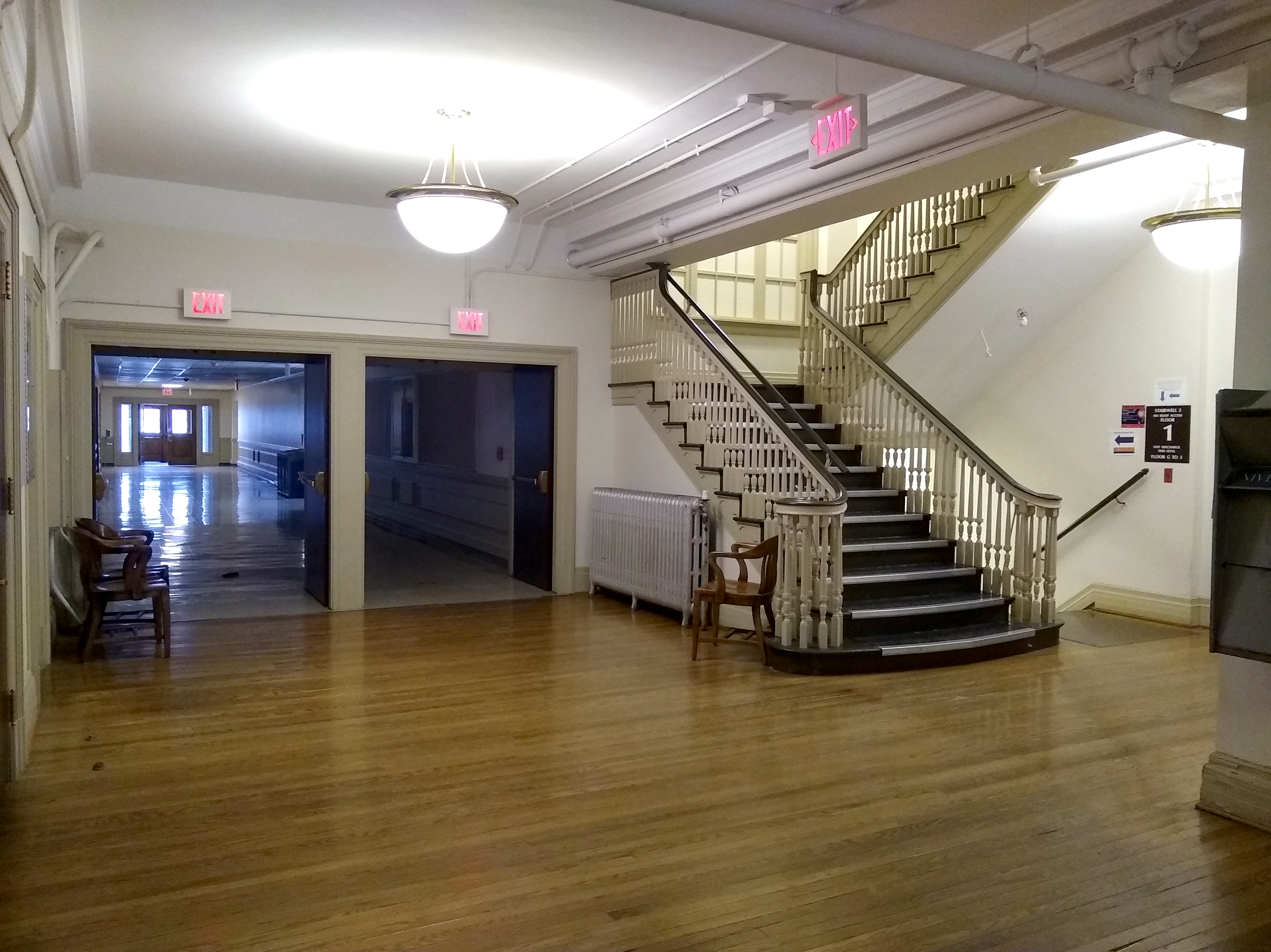
Stairs and hallway on the first floor

In the decades after the university's establishment in 1868, its academic core developed haphazardly along Green Street. When Altgeld Hall was completed in 1897, it filled in the last available space on the street's south side. With nowhere to build the new Agriculture Building (now Davenport Hall), university president Andrew S. Draper suggested a site to the south, facing west. After the Agriculture Building was completed in 1899, Noyes Laboratory of Chemistry was built between it and the Natural History Building. Both new edifices fronted a large lawn, which was divided into a west portion and an east portion by Burrill Avenue. The English Building was the first structure built on the west side of Burrill Street south of the Green Street cluster; it was the last building placed without regard to any formal plan for the future development of the campus.

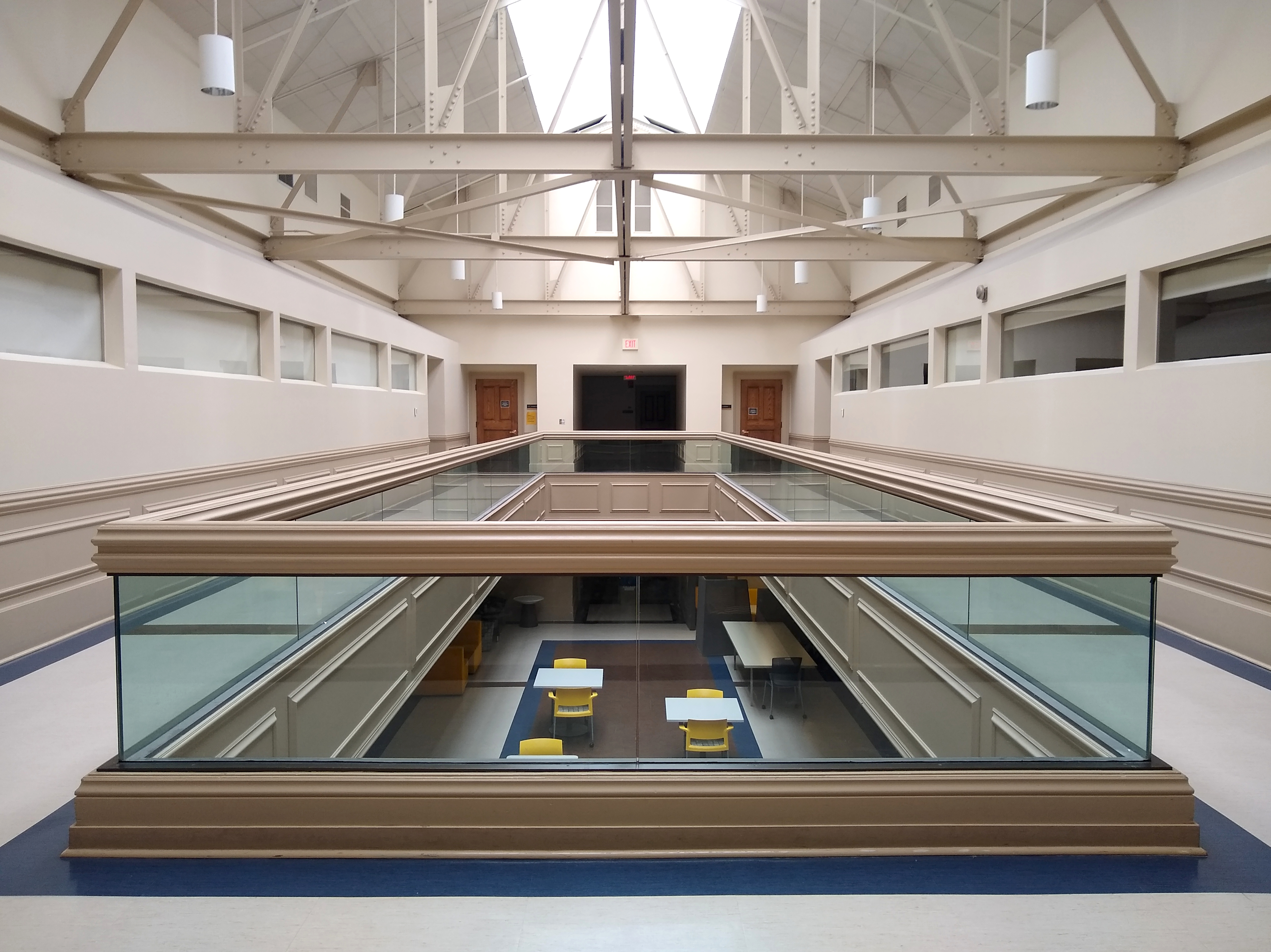
Central atrium

After Edmund Janes James was installed as university president in 1905, a planning commission approved a campus growth proposal created by Clarence H. Blackall and landscape architect John Olmsted. This master plan, which was strongly influenced by the formal ideals of the City Beautiful movement, called for a large quadrangle terminating at an auditorium at its south end. The English Building became the first building on the west side of this new Main Quad; it was joined by Lincoln Hall in 1911 and the Henry Administration Building in 1912. The university later replaced Burrill Avenue with the sidewalk that runs along the English Building's east side.

The 1905 portion of the English Building, as designed by McKim, Mead, and White, was the first Georgian Revival structure on the University of Illinois campus. (The original facade has been covered by later additions, although the rear is still visible from Wright Street.) Georgian Revival styling is evident in the building's red brick exterior, massive chimneys, dormer windows, and horizontal lines. The University of Illinois would go on to interview McKim, Mead, and White about consulting on the campus master plan, but ultimately, Charles A. Platt was hired instead. Platt chose the Georgian Revival style for the designs he created for the university, leading to a glut of Georgian Revival construction on the University of Illinois campus throughout the 1920s. Many of the buildings Platt designed are still in use today, including the Main Library, Louise Freer Hall, Huff Hall, and the Busey–Evans Residence Halls. Because buildings from the following decades (such as the Illini Union) continued to reference the style, Georgian Revival has become a key part of the campus's visual identity.
