= Robert Storer Stephenson =

American architect (1858-1929)

- Born: 18 February 1858; Brooklyn, New York
- Died: 26 May 1929 (aged 71); Westport, Connecticut
- Education: Amherst College
- Occupation: Architect
- Spouse: Katherine Schermerhorn Stephenson
- Practice: McKim, Mead & White; Stephenson & Wheeler
- Buildings: Edgerton, Wrexleigh, Brewster & Co. factory

Robert Storer Stephenson (1858–1929) was an American architect who was active in the late nineteenth and early twentieth centuries. Among numerous private and commercial buildings of that time, he is particularly known for designing two mansions: industrialist Frederick F. Brewster's Tudor-revival house in New Haven's Edgerton Park (completed 1909; demolished 1964) and "Wrexleigh," attorney John Anson Garver's "cottage" on Oyster Bay Cove, on Long Island (completed c.1913). He is also known for the distinctive design of the Brewster Building in Queens, New York.

== Biography ==
Robert Storer Stephenson was born in Brooklyn, New York, on February 18, 1858, to George Storer and Ellen T. (née Brewster) Stephenson.

He graduated from Amherst College in 1880.

He died May 26, 1929, after a lengthy illness.

== Career ==
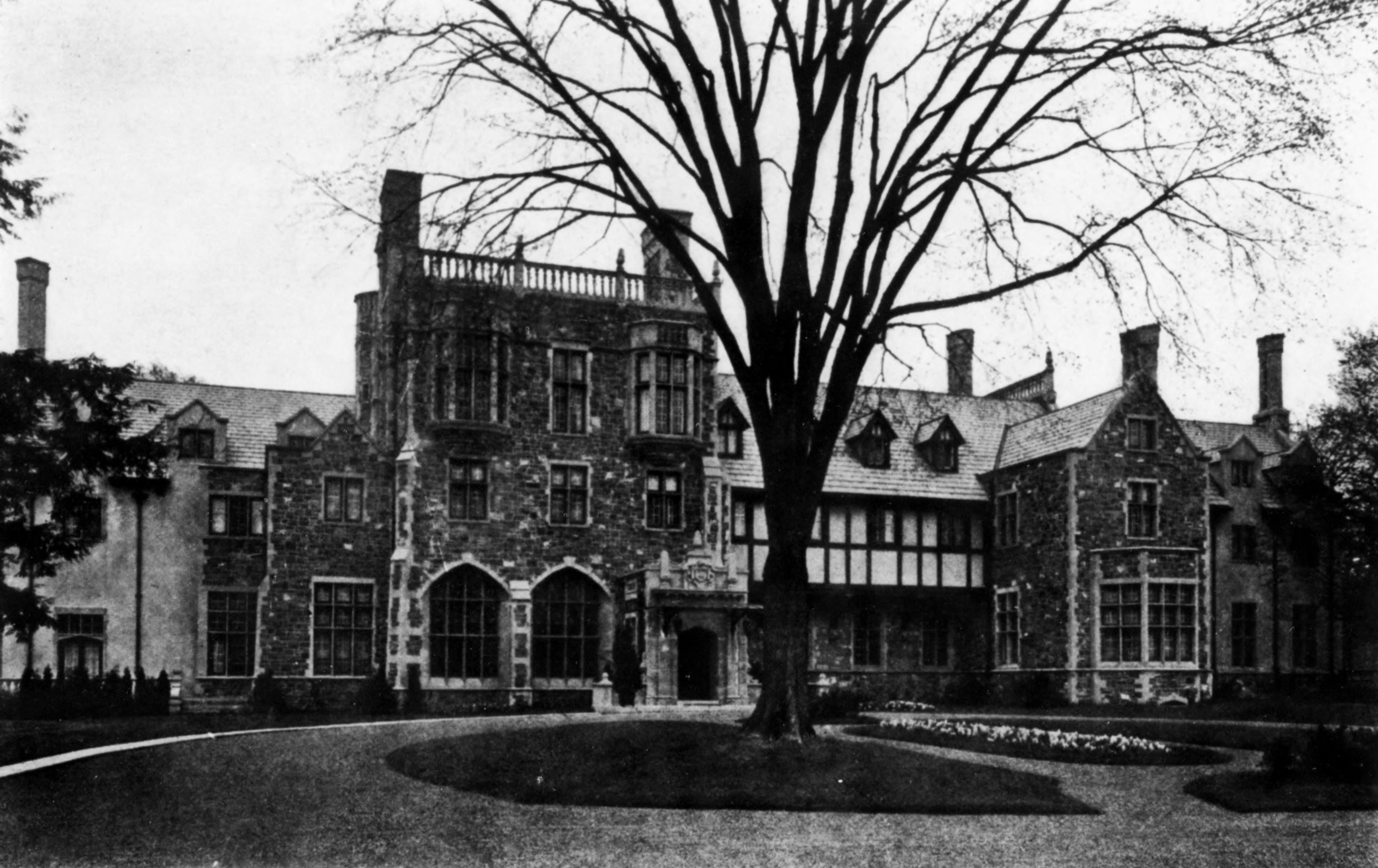
Edgerton House, New Haven, Connecticut, designed by Stephenson for Frederick F. Brewster, as seen c. 1913.

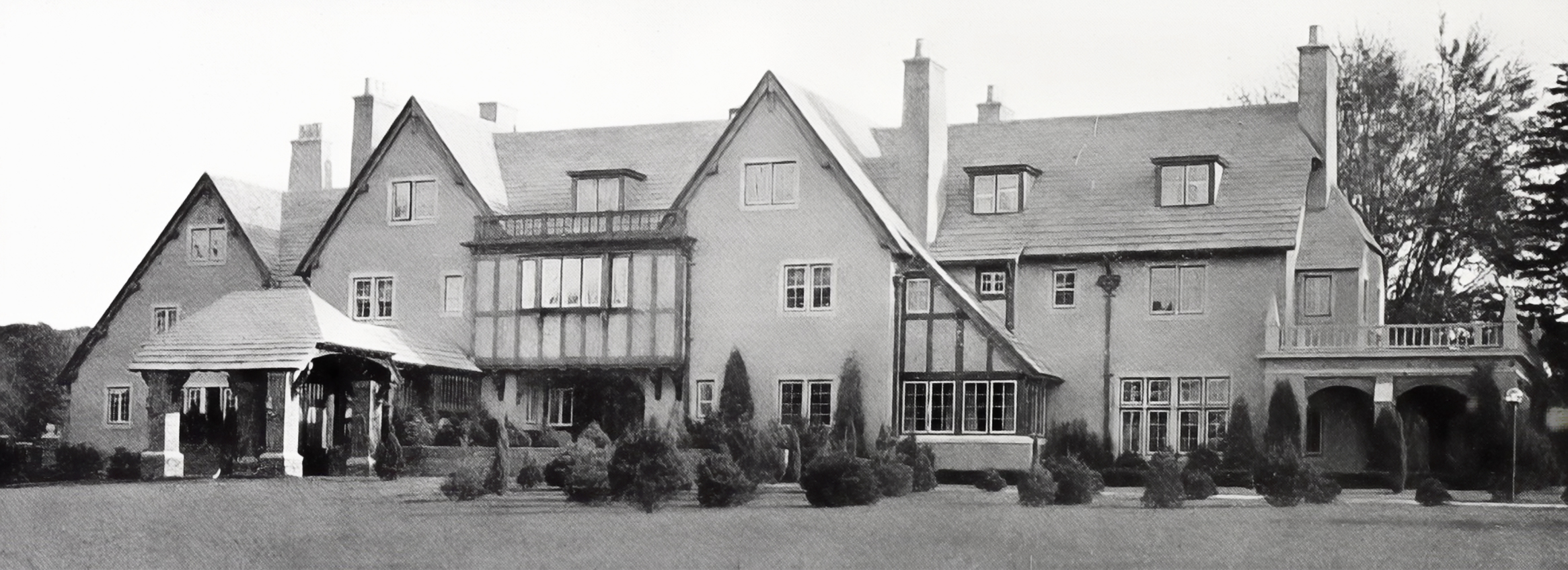
Wrexley House, designed by Stephenson for John Anson Garver, on Oyster Bay Cove, on Long Island, as seen c. 1915.

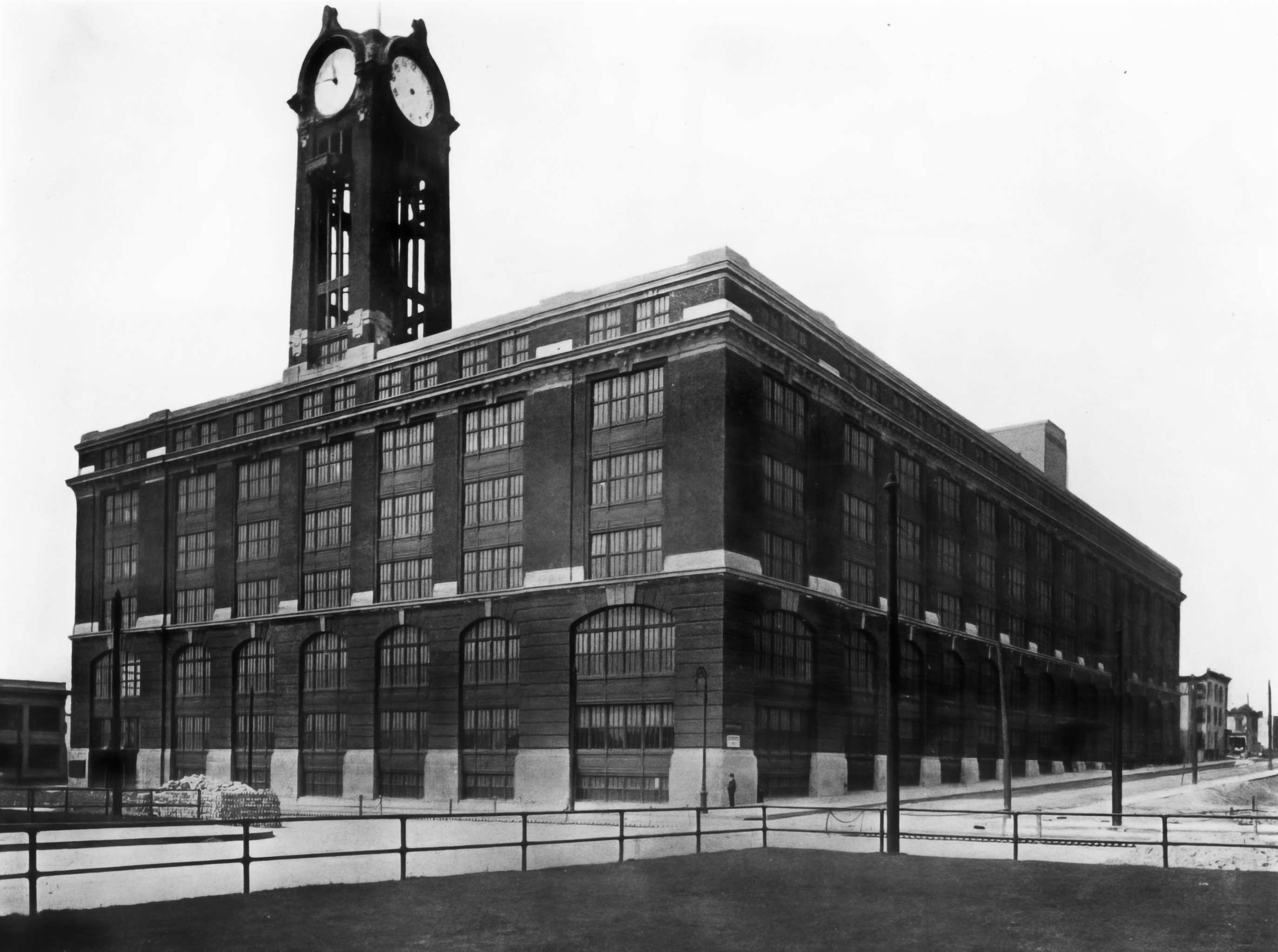
The Brewster automobile factory, as seen c. 1915.

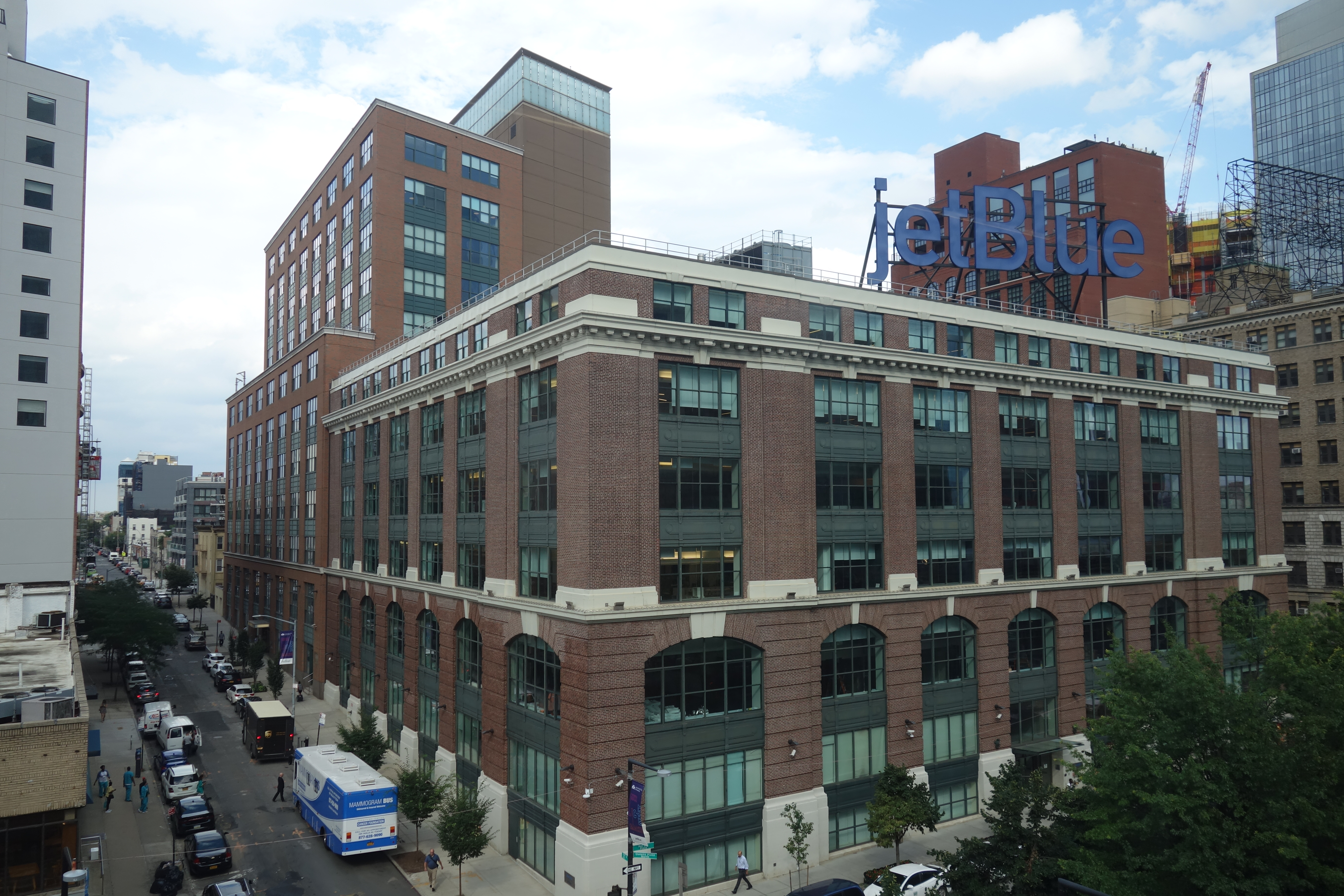
The Brewster Building, as seen in 2019—serving as headquarters for JetBlue.

Soon after completing college, Stephenson joined the renowned architectural firm of McKim, Mead & White, which was known for promoting the American Renaissance in fin de siècle New York at the end of the 19th century. He left this firm in 1882 and eventually formed his own, Stephenson & Wheeler. He was a partner at Stephenson & Wheeler from 1886 to 1921, when he retired.

Stephenson was best known for his work for wealthy families in the environs of New York City, New Jersey, and Connecticut. These included Edgerton (Connecticut) and Wrexleigh (New York), as well as designing homes for Charles Bigelow, Thomas E. Gillespie, and Oliver Gould Jennings (882 Fifth Avenue, New York City). However, he was also the Architectural Advisor to the Church Committee of the Newark, New Jersey Diocese and in that capacity was responsible for designing or co-designing several churches, among them the Trinity Congregational church in East Orange, New Jersey (1891, in partnership with Ernest Greene).

In 1911, Stephenson was also responsible for an innovative design for Brewster & Co., automobile manufacturers' factory in Queen's. An article in Carriage Monthly described it: "The new factory at Long Island City L.I., built especially for light and heavy carriage and automobile work, is of the most improved kind and will be a model for the next few generations." An American Architect article contended, "The automobile factory of Brewster & Co. is an unprecedented proposition in factory construction." The building was particularly notable for its distinctive clocktower, which The AIA guide to New York City characterized as "constructivist" in style. A 2001 New York Times article went into further detail about the building and its plaza:

The architects Stephenson & Wheeler designed a 400,000-square-foot red brick factory, simple in style but with a high clock tower with sinuous tracery. The careful detailing of the clock tower set the building apart from other industrial buildings—it seems to reflect the Secession style explored in factory and industrial architecture and public works in northern Europe around that time. The plaza originally was landscaped, but its sense of ceremonial space was destroyed by the later construction of elevated subway lines, which now completely dominate the area.

The Times article traces some of the building's history—including the production of Rolls-Royce automobiles in the 1920s and 1930s and the building's acquisition and renovation by MetLife c. 2000. Since 2010, JetBlue's headquarters have occupied the building.
