= Liggett Hall =

Former barracks in Manhattan, New York

Coordinates: 40.689°N 74.018°W

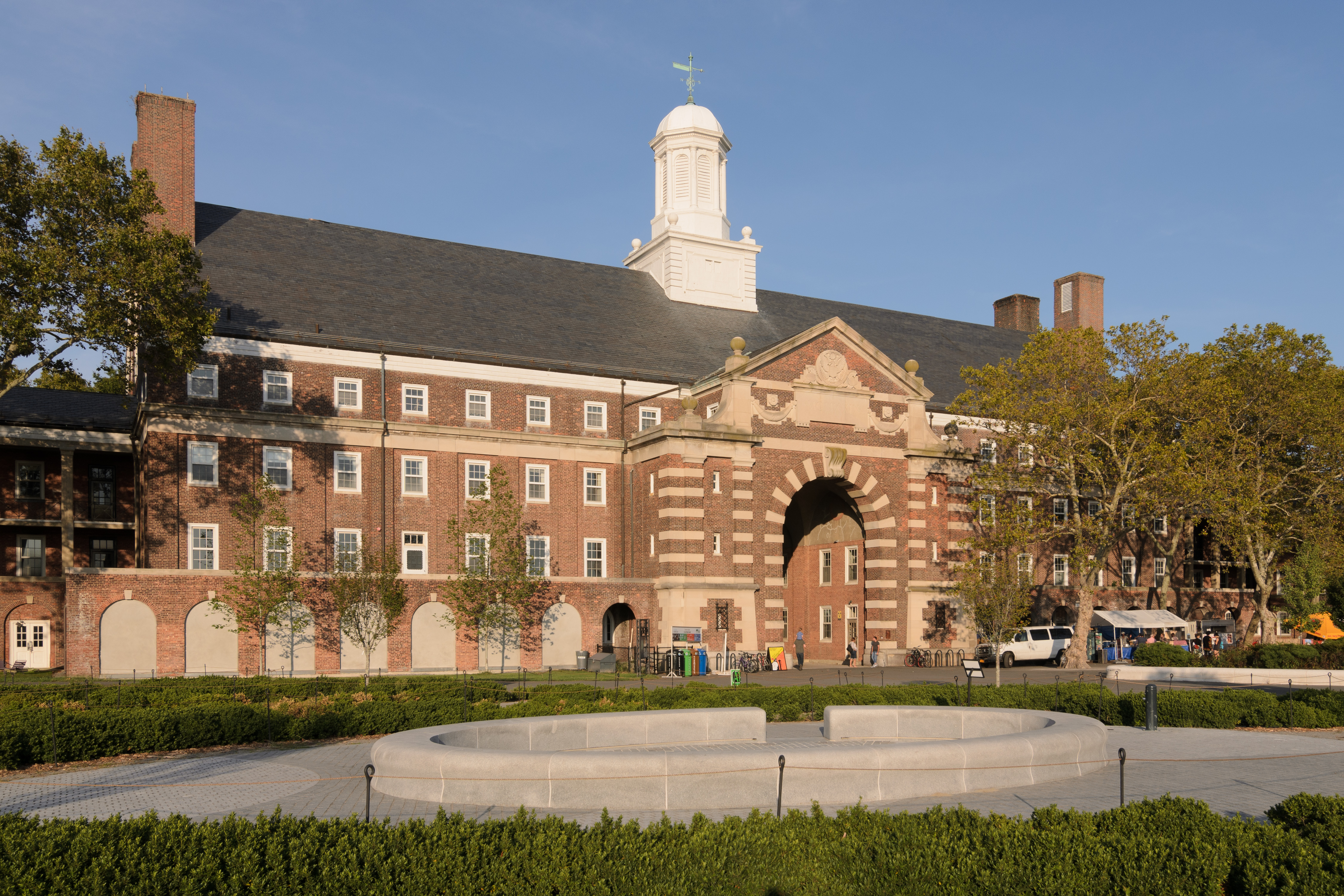
Liggett Hall

Liggett Hall, also known as Building 400, is a former barracks building designed by McKim, Mead & White and built in 1929 near Fort Jay on Governors Island in New York Harbor, in New York City. The Georgian Revival building is three to 4 1/2 stories tall and measures 1,023 feet (312 m) long.

== History ==
Liggett Hall today follows a design from a master plan for Fort Jay that the architectural firm developed for the island post at the request of Secretary of War Elihu Root in 1904. The overall plan was never executed, but it inspired designs by other architectural firms, whether augmenting the barracks or constructing Works Progress Administration projects in the mid-1930s.

The need for Liggett Hall was dire in the 1920s. Temporary wood barracks and old warehouses remaining from World War I housed the 16th Infantry Regiment garrison for the post from 1922 to 1941. Repeatedly reported as substandard and subject to several destructive fires through the 1920s, funds were finally appropriated for its construction in 1928–29. While the need for the barracks was never in question, the intention behind the alignment has been.

In the 1920s, the island was under consideration by U.S. representative Fiorello H. La Guardia as a site for a small, 2000-foot-long downtown airport or airstrip. But as laid out, the building stretches across the center of the island for almost half its width, thwarting the possibility of building a runway. The proposal finally became moot in the late 1920s when federal government aviation regulations required airport runways to be 3000 feet in length, and Floyd Bennett Field was ultimately built in Brooklyn in 1930.

The construction of Liggett Hall was approved in 1928, when $1,086,000 was set aside for construction of the building, and $30,000 was allocated for architects' fees. When it opened, Liggett Hall was among the world's largest army barracks.

Today, Liggett Hall is a centerpiece of Governors Island Park. Liggett Terrace, a multi-use plaza and park area, was built outside the southwest Liggett Hall, connecting the island's historic northeastern section with its southwestern expanse.

== Description ==
Liggett Hall measures 1,023 feet (312 m) long, oriented on a northwest-southeast axis, and contains two 225-foot (69 m) wings protruding southwestward on each side. The overall shape is an elongated "U" that surrounds a courtyard on the southeast. A sally port runs northeast-southwest through the center of the building. The sally port contains brick and stone voussoirs, and a cornerstone inscribed with the text "Erected by the Quartermaster Corps, 1929." The facade is red brick laid in common bond.

The sections of Liggett Hall are variously 3, 4, and 4 1/2 stories tall. The central section is the tallest, at 4 1/2 stories, and contains a steeply-sloped slate gable roof with a cupola atop it. There are also cupolas atop the slate gable roofs of the four corner pavilions, which are three stories high. The northeast facade has small porticos that provide entry to each section of the building; these porticos have pediments that are supported by Tuscan columns and intersect the gable roofs. The southwest facade has two-story galleries (now partially enclosed).

== Influence ==
Influenced by the regimental barracks of France that the U.S. Army used in World War I, the barracks was the first of three large barracks complexes constructed between the world wars by the army to house an entire regiment. The two others were "The Cuartels," larger than Liggett Hall and built between 1930 and 1939 at Fort Benning, Georgia; and "The Castle," a 1,285-man barracks at McChord Army Airbase constructed in 1940.
