= Busey–Evans Residence Halls =

Dormitories in Urbana, Illinois

- Women's Residence Hall and West Residence Hall, University of Illinois Urbana–Champaign
- U.S. National Register of Historic Places
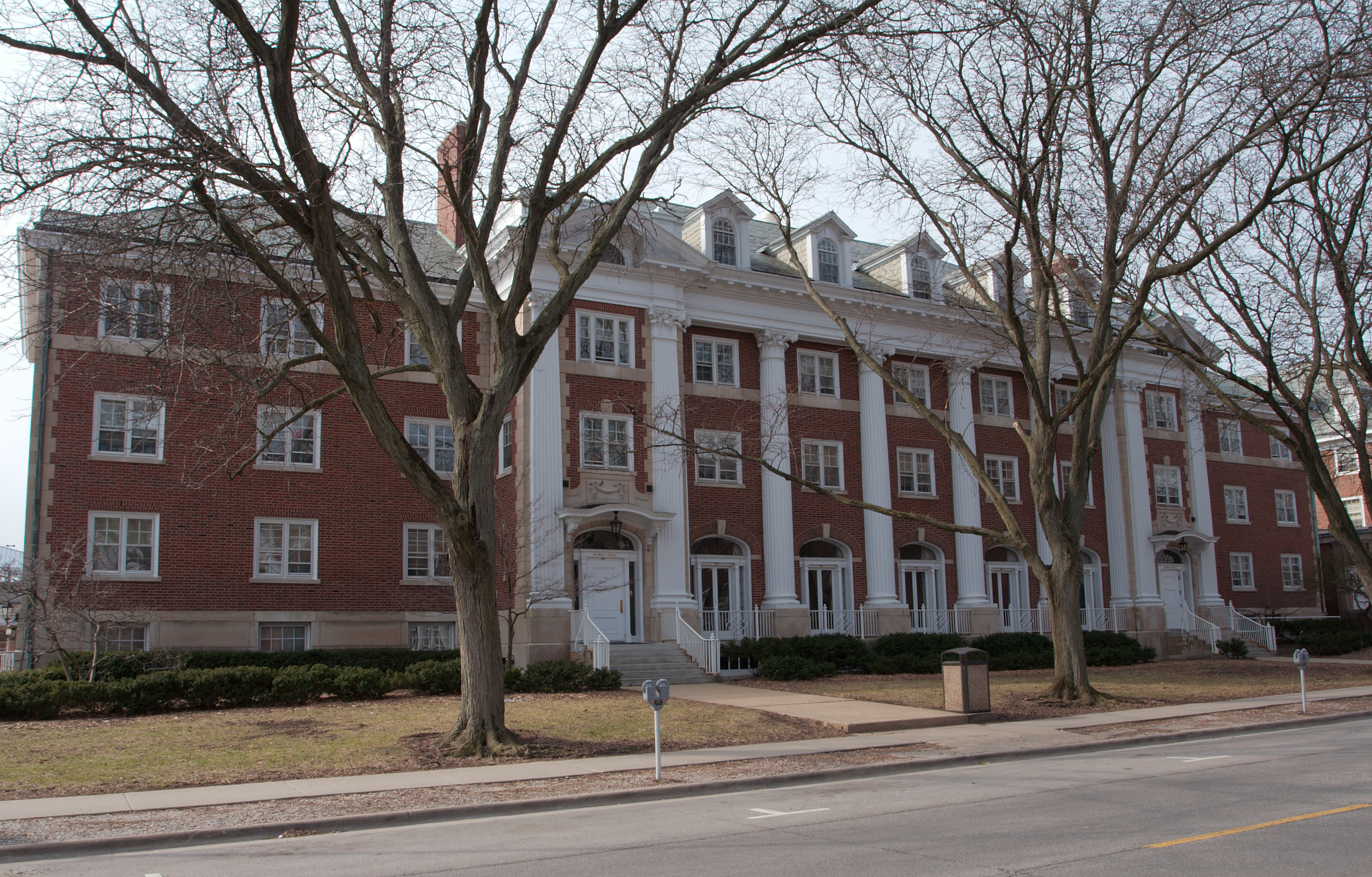

- Location within Illinois Location within the United States
- Location: 1111-1115 W. Nevada St., Urbana, Illinois
- Coordinates: 40°6′27″N 88°13′28″W
- Area: less than one acre
- Built: 1916
- Architect: White, James; Platt, Charles
- Architectural style: Georgian Revival
- MPS: University of Illinois Buildings designed by Charles A. Platt MPS
- NRHP reference No.: 02001752
- Added to NRHP: February 5, 2003

The Busey–Evans Residence Halls, historically known as the Women's Residence Hall and the West Residence Hall respectively, are historic dormitories at the University of Illinois Urbana–Champaign.

== History ==
Busey Hall was built in 1916, while Evans Hall was built in 1926; a connector wing links the two buildings, and they are considered part of the same dormitory complex. James A. White designed Busey Hall, while Charles A. Platt designed Evans Hall; both architects played an important role in designing other buildings on the university's campus, and both chose the Georgian Revival style for their designs to match the campus's architectural theme. The Women's Residence Hall was the first residence hall on the university's campus; the all-female dormitory filled a need for women's housing at the university, which had been privately maintained and in short supply. The hall quickly filled up, and the West Residence Hall was built to provide additional space for female students. In 1937, the buildings were renamed for university trustees Mary E. Busey and Laura B. Evans. The residence halls were still in use as all-female student housing until the fall semester of 2019, when the Evans Hall was designated as all male for the first time in its history to accommodate the closure of another all male residence hall on campus.

The residence halls were added to the National Register of Historic Places on February 5, 2003.
