= Brewster Building (Queens) =

Manufacturing plant or office in New York City since 1910

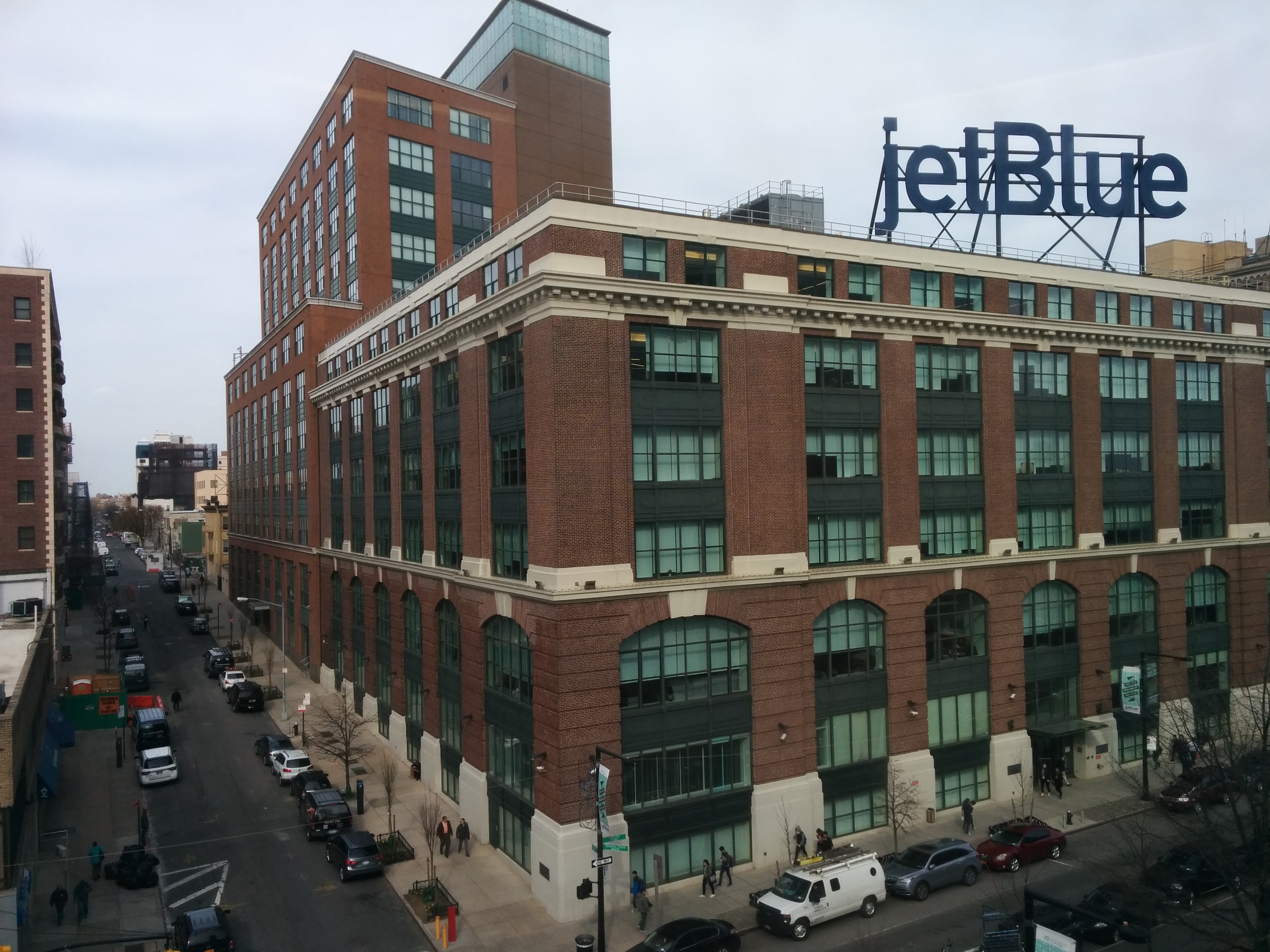
- View of the building from the south, including a bit of 27th St
- Interactive map of the Brewster Building area

General information
- Status: Completed
- Type: Office
- Location: 27-01 Queens Plaza North; Queens, New York 11101; U.S.
- Coordinates: 40°45′01.8″N 73°56′20.0″W
- Current tenants: JetBlue; MetLife; WeWork
- Construction started: 1910
- Owner: BRAUSE PLAZA NORTH LLC

Technical details
- Floor count: 7

The Brewster Building is a 400,000-square-foot (37,000 m^{2}) building at 27-01 Queens Plaza North in Long Island City, Queens, New York City. Once an assembly plant for Rolls-Royce automobiles, Brewster automobiles, and Brewster airplanes, in particular the Brewster F2A Buffalo fighter and the SB2A Buccaneer light bomber, it later became the corporate headquarters for JetBlue Airways.

== Usage by Brewster ==
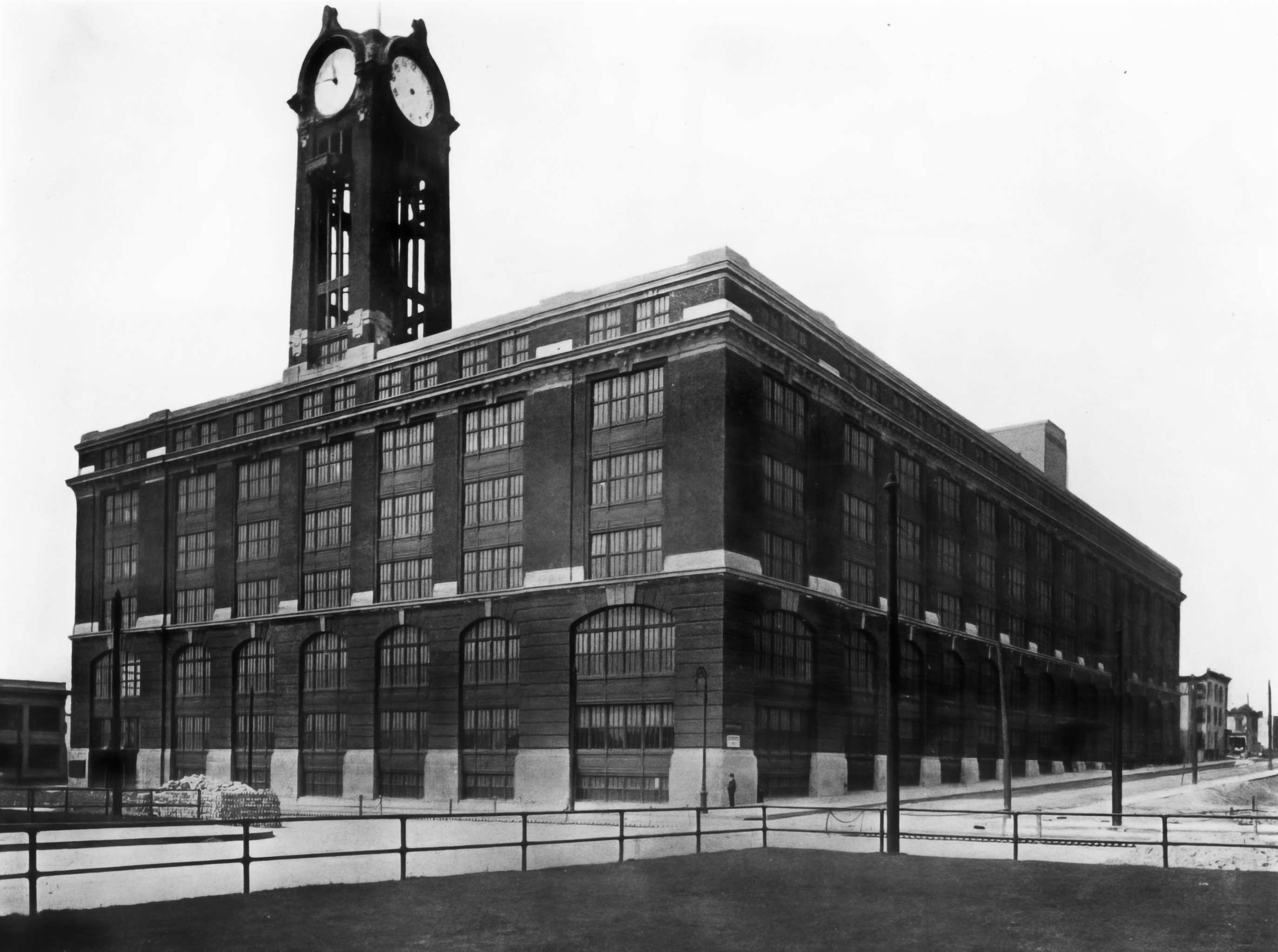
The Brewster building as it appeared in 1911.

The building, designed by Stephenson & Wheeler, opened in 1911 to handle the assembly of the chassis for the Brewster cars that were being built since 1905 at 47th Street and Broadway in Times Square in nearby Manhattan. The building was one of the first major developments at the foot of the Queensboro Bridge, opened in 1909, which reduced car transport from Queens to Times Square to a matter of minutes. In 1915 it began building the Brewster Knight.

In 1925, the company was bought by Rolls-Royce of America, which had been operating out of a plant in Springfield, Massachusetts. In 1931, the Rolls-Royce Springfield operation ended. From 1931 to 1934, Rolls-Royce Phantom II chassis were shipped directly to the Long Island City plant when Rolls-Royce terminated its United States assembly program.

From 1934 to 1936, under J. S. Inskip, Brewster automobiles using Ford chassis were built at the plant. The Brewster operation ceased in 1936. The Brewster Aeronautical Corporation manufactured the Brewster F2A Buffalo and a version of the Vought F4U Corsair known as the F3A-1 during World War II at the plant. The multi-story layout of the building limited airplane production efficiency. The aircraft were flown from Roosevelt Field in Mineola.

== Disrepair and reuse ==
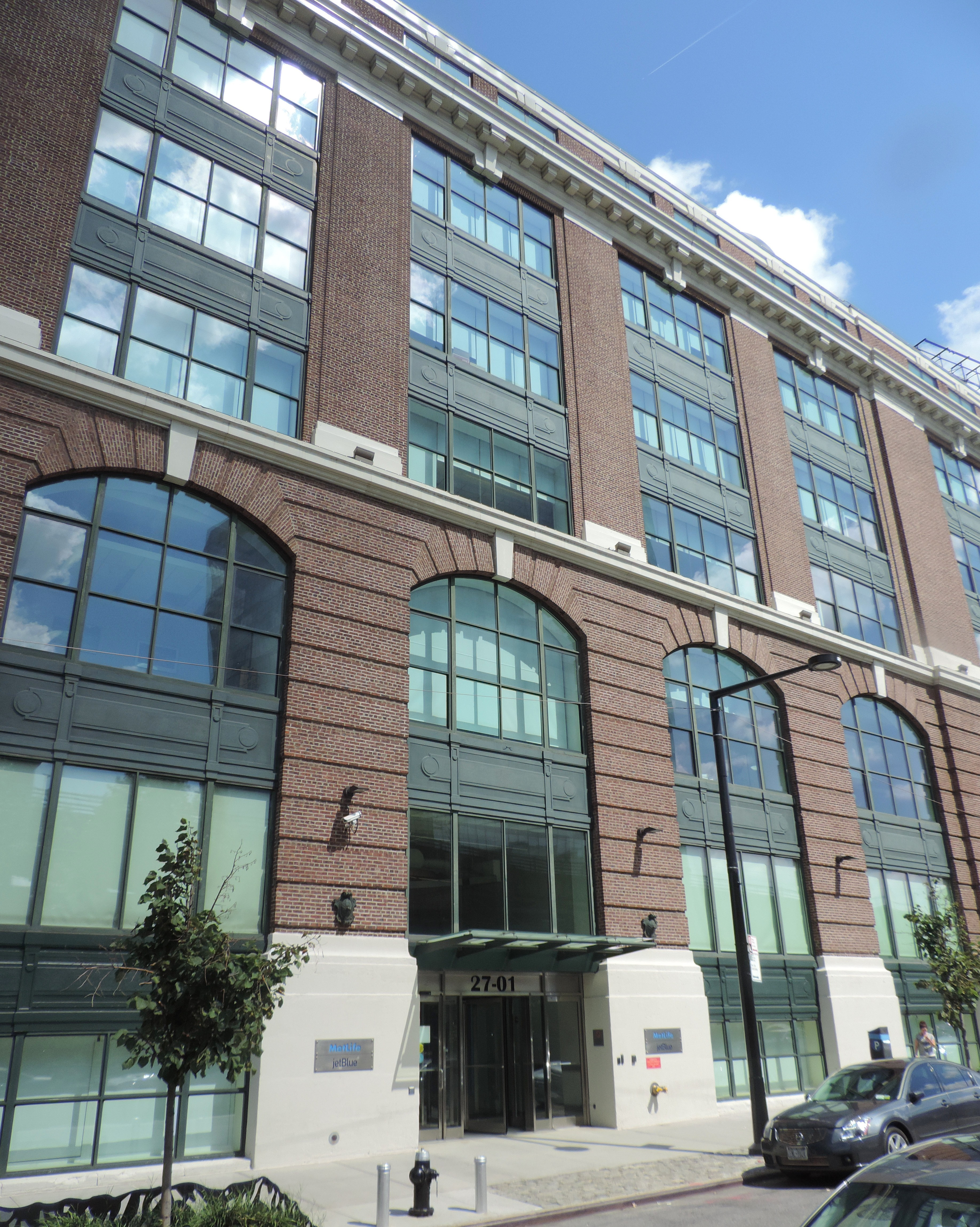
Street level view of facade

The building fell into disrepair following the war and its clock tower was dismantled in 1950. A series of garment manufacturers occupied the building until 1996. In 1996, Brause Realty extensively remodeled the building and an adjoining 12-story tower and it became an operational center for Metropolitan Life Insurance with 1,500 employees.

In 2010, JetBlue announced it would combine employees at its existing large Kew Gardens, Queens and small 70-person Darien, Connecticut campuses into the building, bringing 1,000 employees to it. JetBlue is the only major airline headquartered in New York City. The new headquarters is 6 miles (9.7 km) from the previous one. JetBlue, looking for a new corporate headquarters, had also considered moving to Orlando, Florida. As part of taking on the moniker of being the hometown airline of New York City, JetBlue announced it would be joint branding the "I Love New York" logo. JetBlue stated in 2012 that it plans to construct a 40-foot (12 m) lighted sign stating "JetBlue" on top of the 8th floor, adjacent to the outdoor terrace.
