= Edgerton Park =

- Edgerton
- U.S. National Register of Historic Places
- U.S. Historic district
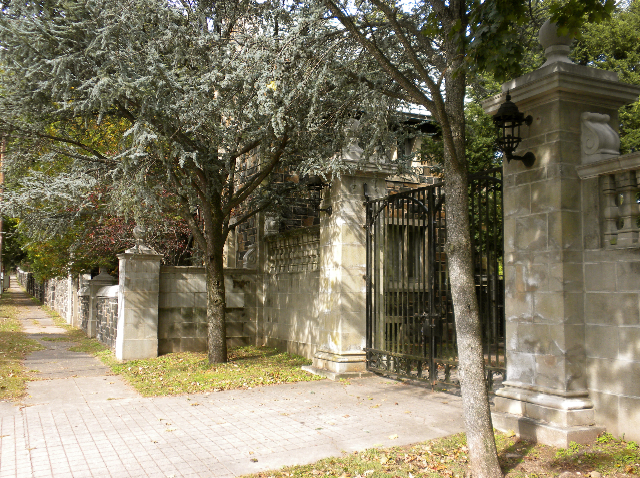
- Wall, gate and gatehouse in 2010

- Location within Connecticut Location within the United States
- Location: 75 Cliff Street, New Haven, Connecticut
- Coordinates: 41°20′4″N 72°54′51″W
- Area: 20 acres (8.1 ha)
- Built: 1909
- Architect: Robert Storer Stephenson
- Architectural style: Tudor Revival, Country Place Era landscape
- NRHP reference No.: 88001469
- Added to NRHP: September 19, 1988

Edgerton Park, also known as the Frederick F. Brewster Estate, is a 20-acre (8.1 ha) public park on Whitney Avenue, straddling the New Haven–Hamden town line in Connecticut.

It is site of a demolished Victorian home known as "Ivy Nook". In 1909, it became the estate of industrialist Frederick F. Brewster, with a new Tudor-style mansion constructed named Edgerton for its location on the edge of town. The mansion was demolished in 1964, pursuant to Brewster's wishes, after the death of his wife, and the property was donated to the city. The present landscape was designed by Robert Storer Stephenson in 1909.

The property was listed as historic district on the National Register of Historic Places in 1988. In 1988, the district included seven contributing buildings, eight other contributing structures, and one contributing object.

== Features ==
The 22-acre park features the original wall, greenhouses, carriage house, gatehouse, and bridge from the Brewster estate. There is also a large fountain and community gardens. The Sarah T. Crosby Conservatory in the Community Greenhouses features a rain forest exhibit, a dry landscape with desert plants, and orchids.

The Elm Shakespeare Company has been offering outdoor summer performances in Edgerton Park since 1995.

== Edgerton Park Conservancy ==
Edgerton Park Conservancy is a non-profit, volunteer organization dedicated to the needs of Edgerton Park. It works to restore and maintain the buildings and grounds, and offers education programs for schools and the community in the conservatory. The conservancy works in partnership with the city of New Haven, which owns the property.

G.R.O.W.E.R.S., a horticultural program for handicapped adults, offers plants for sale in the greenhouse.

== Gallery ==
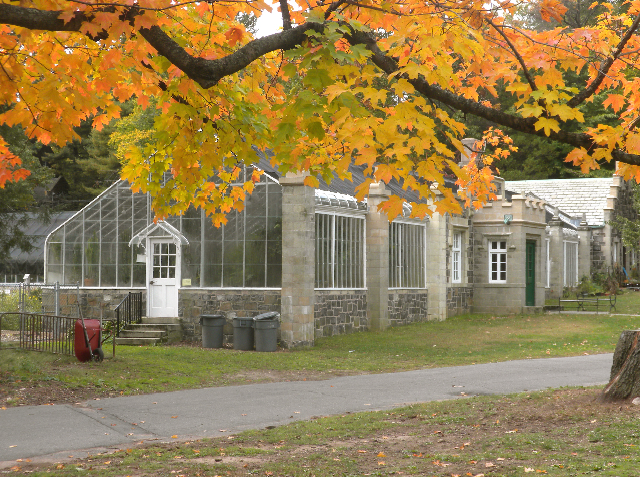
1909 Conservatory

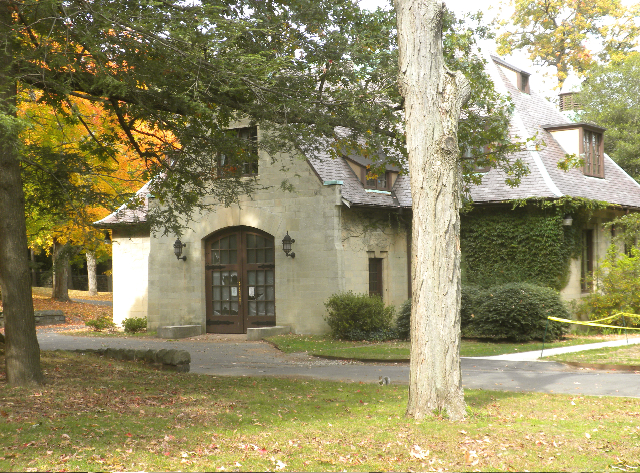
1909 Carriage House

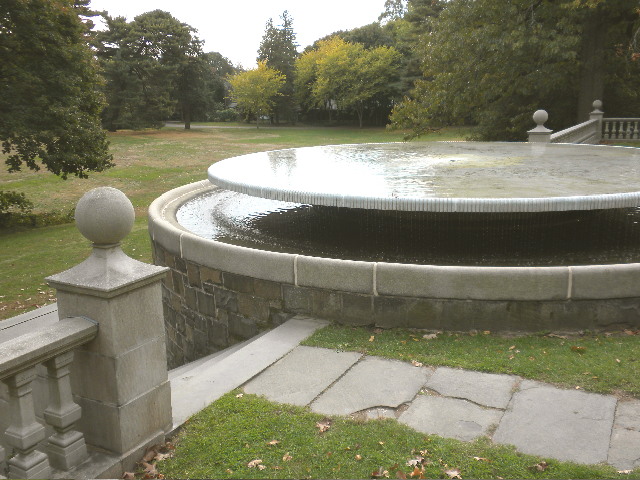
1991 Brewster Fountain

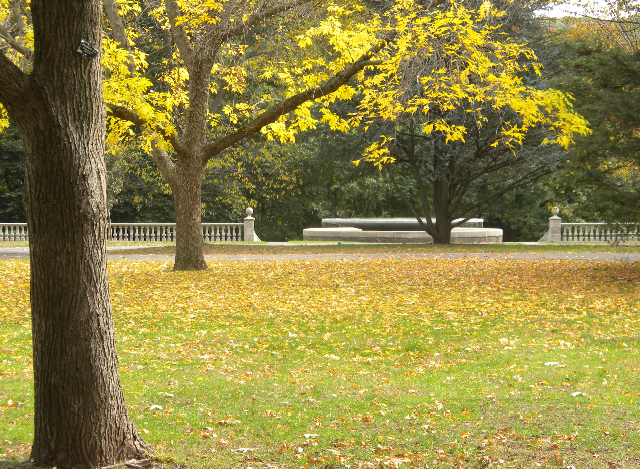
Edgerton Park with Brewster Fountain

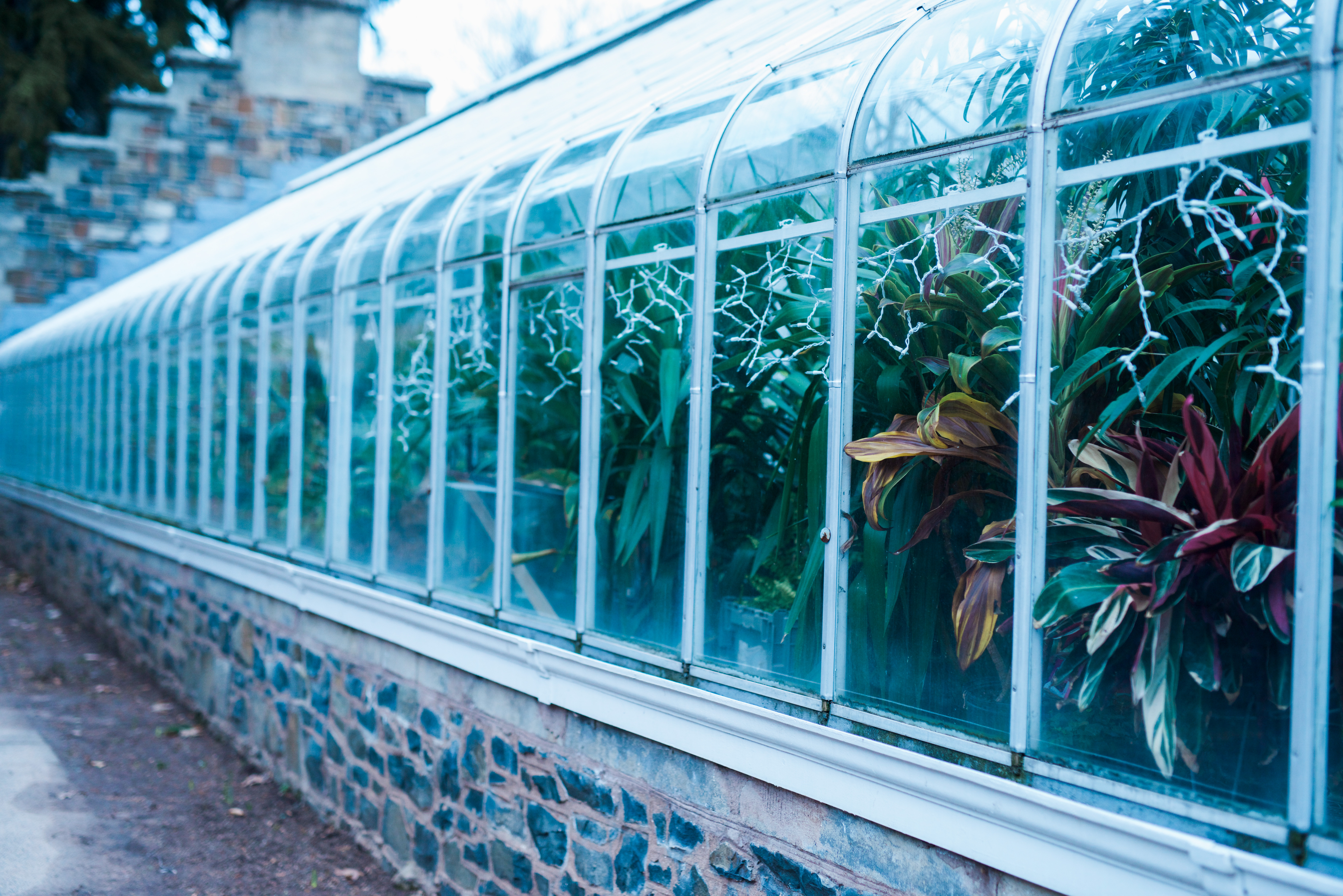
Edgerton Park greenhouse in January 2017

== See also ==
- National Register of Historic Places listings in New Haven, Connecticut
- National Register of Historic Places listings in New Haven County, Connecticut
