= History of the University of Illinois Urbana-Champaign =

Coordinates: 40°6′37.94″N 88°13′42.28″W

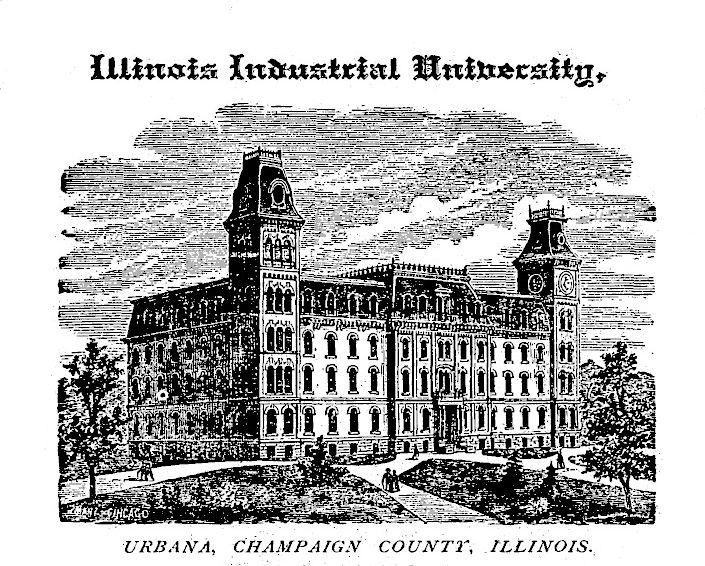
The original University Hall which stood until 1938 when it was replaced by Gregory hall and the Illini Union. Pieces were used in the erection of Hallene Gateway dedicated in 1998.

The history of the University of Illinois Urbana-Champaign dates back to 1862. The University of Illinois Urbana-Champaign opened on March 2, 1868, and is the second oldest public university in the state (after Illinois State University), and is a founding member of the Big Ten Conference.

== Beginnings ==
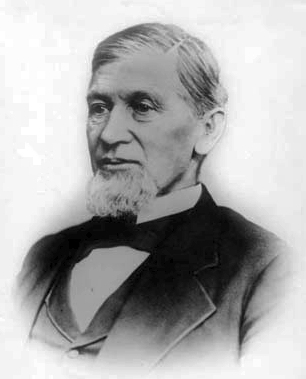
John Milton Gregory

External audio
- “Focus; The History of the University of Illinois”, 2001, 47:39, WILL Illinois Public Media

Established as one of 37 public land-grant institutions established after the Morrill Land-Grant Colleges Act. The act was signed by Abraham Lincoln on July 2, 1862. The Morrill Act of 1862 granted each state in the United States a portion of land on which to establish a major public state university, one which could teach agriculture, mechanic arts, and military training, "without excluding other scientific and classical studies." This phrase would engender controversy over the university's initial academic philosophies, polarizing the relationship between the people of Illinois and the university's first president, John Milton Gregory. Illinois was one of seven commonwealths that had not formed a state university. The grant established eligibility for 480,000 acres of public scrip land valued at $600,000.

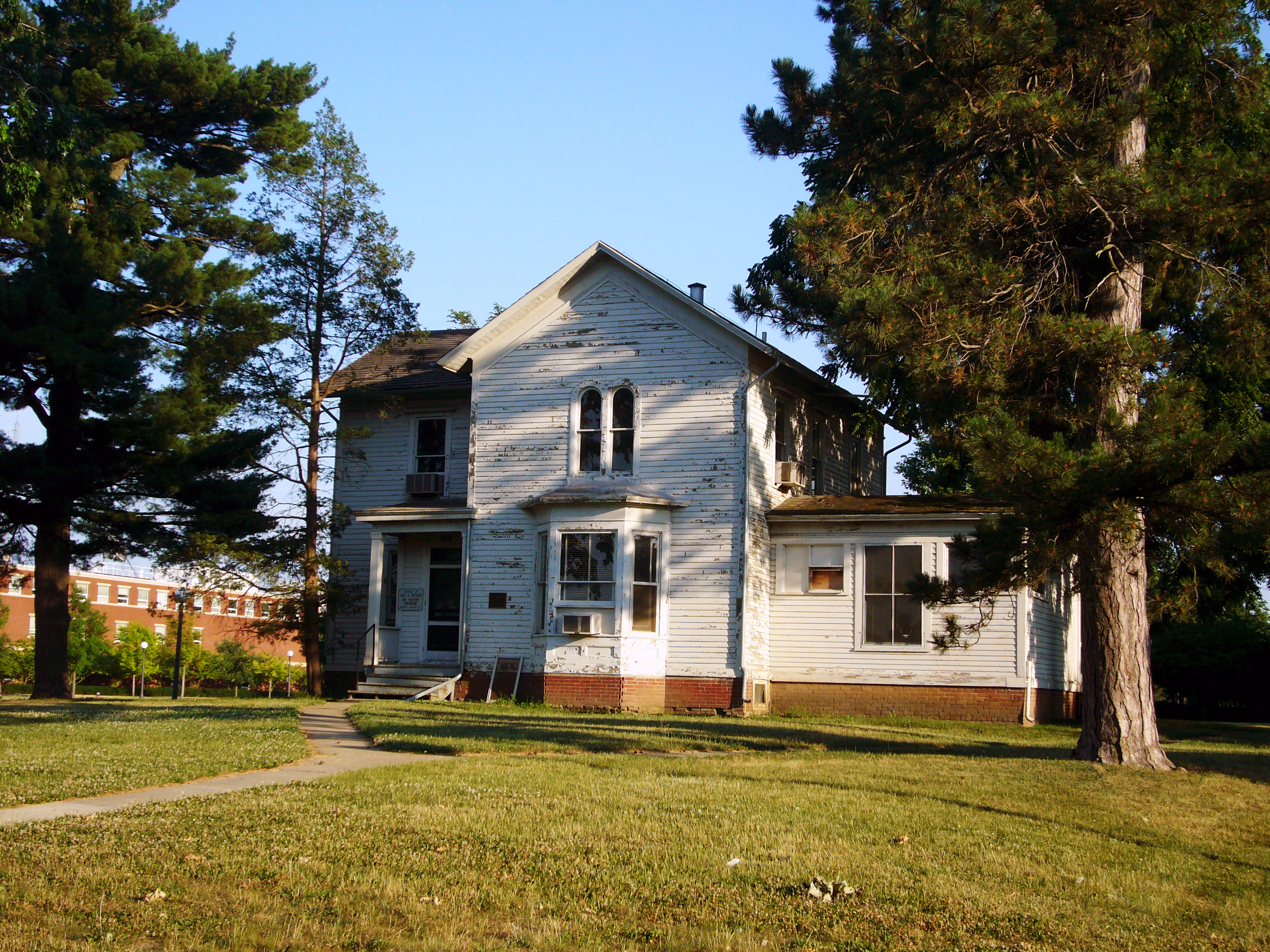
Mumford House constructed in 1870 is the oldest structure on campus

In 1867 the state established a university for the purpose of fostering access to higher education for the working people. After a bidding war between several cities, Urbana was selected in 1867 as the site for the new school. From the beginning, Gregory's desire to establish an institution firmly grounded in the liberal arts tradition, which was at odds with many State residents and lawmakers who wanted the university to offer classes based solely around "industrial education" The university opened for classes on March 2, 1868, with two faculty members and 77 students. This same year the College of Agriculture, Consumer, and Environmental Sciences and the College of Fine and Applied Arts (Then called the College of Literary Science) were established. This was then followed by The College of Engineering in 1868. The debate between the liberal arts curriculum and industrial education continued in the university's inaugural address, as Dr. Newton Bateman outlined the various interpretations of the Morrill Act in his speech. Gregory's thirteen-year tenure would be marred by this debate. Clashes between Gregory and legislators and lawmakers forced his resignation from his post as president in 1880, saying "[I am] staggering under too heavy a load of cares, and irritated by what has sometimes seemed as needless opposition." Nevertheless, Gregory is largely credited with establishing the university as it is today. Gregory's grave is on the Urbana campus, between Altgeld Hall and the Henry Administration Building. His headstone (mimicking the epitaph of British architect Christopher Wren) reads, "If you seek his monument, look about you."

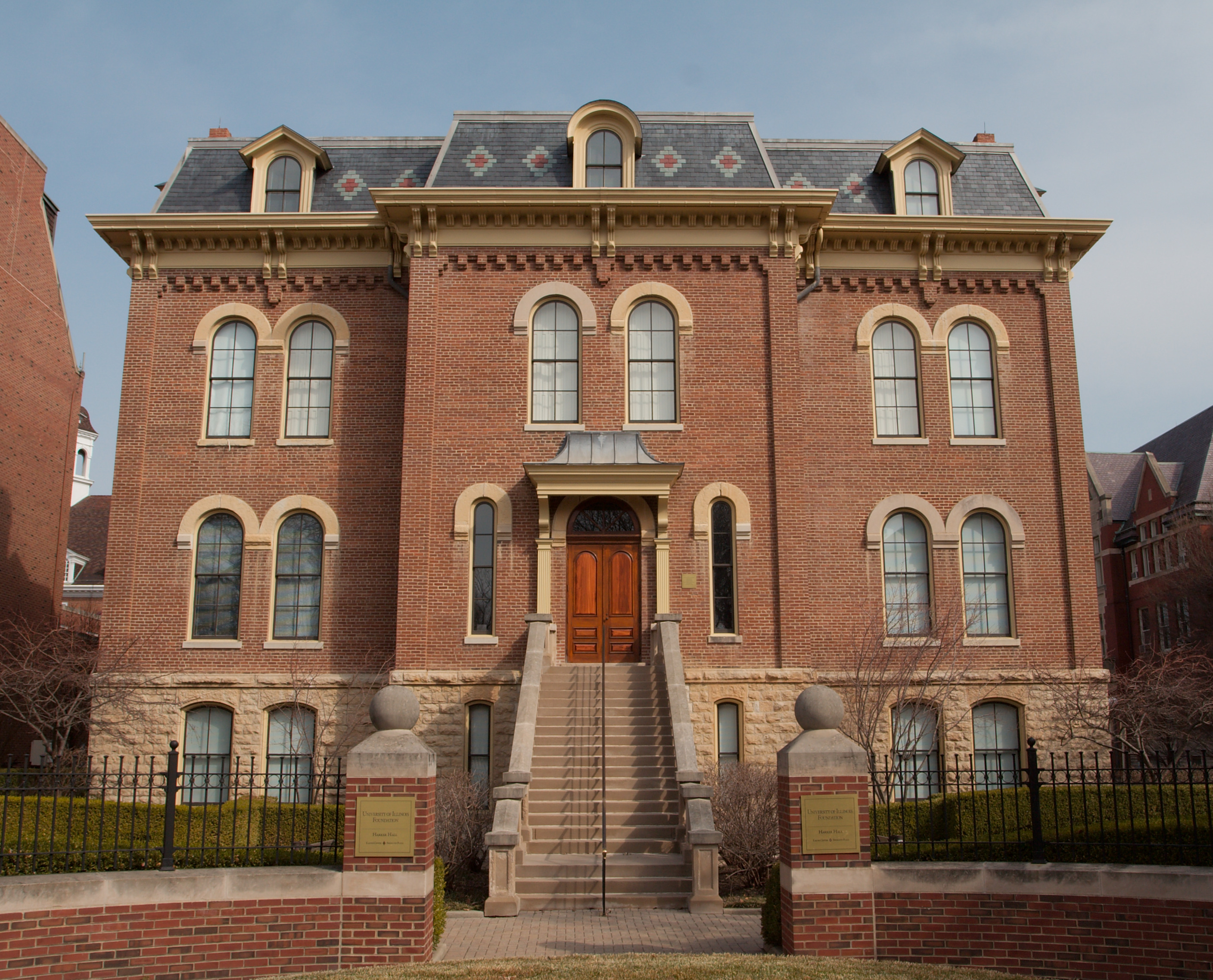
Harker Hall built in 1877

The Library, which opened with the school in 1868, started with 1,039 volumes and grew slowly until 1909, when an increase in library resources created the University Library. Eventually, then University President Edmund J. James, in a speech to the board of trustees in 1912, proposed to create a research library on par with those at the great German academic institutions. He declared that the Library should accumulate "at least a million of books as rapidly as possible," and that the state "spend a million dollars to build a new building to house the collection." Today, the University Library system is one of the largest in the nation.

In 1870 the Mumford House was constructed as a model farmhouse for the school's experimental farm. As of today, the Mumford House is the oldest structure on campus. Main University Hall, which was the 4th building built on the UIUC campus was built in 1871. The Original University Hall stood where the Union presently stands today. In 1877 Harker Hall was built and was known as the Chemical Laboratory Later the building was named in honor of Oliver A. Harker, who served as dean of the university's law school from 1903 to 1916. During this same time student run initiatives such as the campus paper The Daily Illini began in 1871.

=== Evolution of name ===
University names
Year	Name
1867	Illinois Industrial University
1885	University of Illinois
1935	University of Illinois at Urbana-Champaign
2020	University of Illinois Urbana-Champaign
*Official name change where "Urbana" & "Champaign" were used in publications previously

The original name in 1867 was "Illinois Industrial University." In 1885, the Illinois Industrial University officially changed its name to the University of Illinois, reflecting its holistic agricultural, mechanical, and liberal arts curricula. This remained the official name for 50 years, until it was changed to the University of Illinois at Urbana-Champaign in 1935; "at" was dropped in the 21st century. However, the institution continues to be known as "the University of Illinois," or just "Illinois" in both the media and on many of UIUC's web pages. Starting in 2008, the university began re-branding itself as "Illinois" rather than UIUC, changing the website and email addresses from uiuc.edu to Illinois.edu.

== Growth and expansion ==
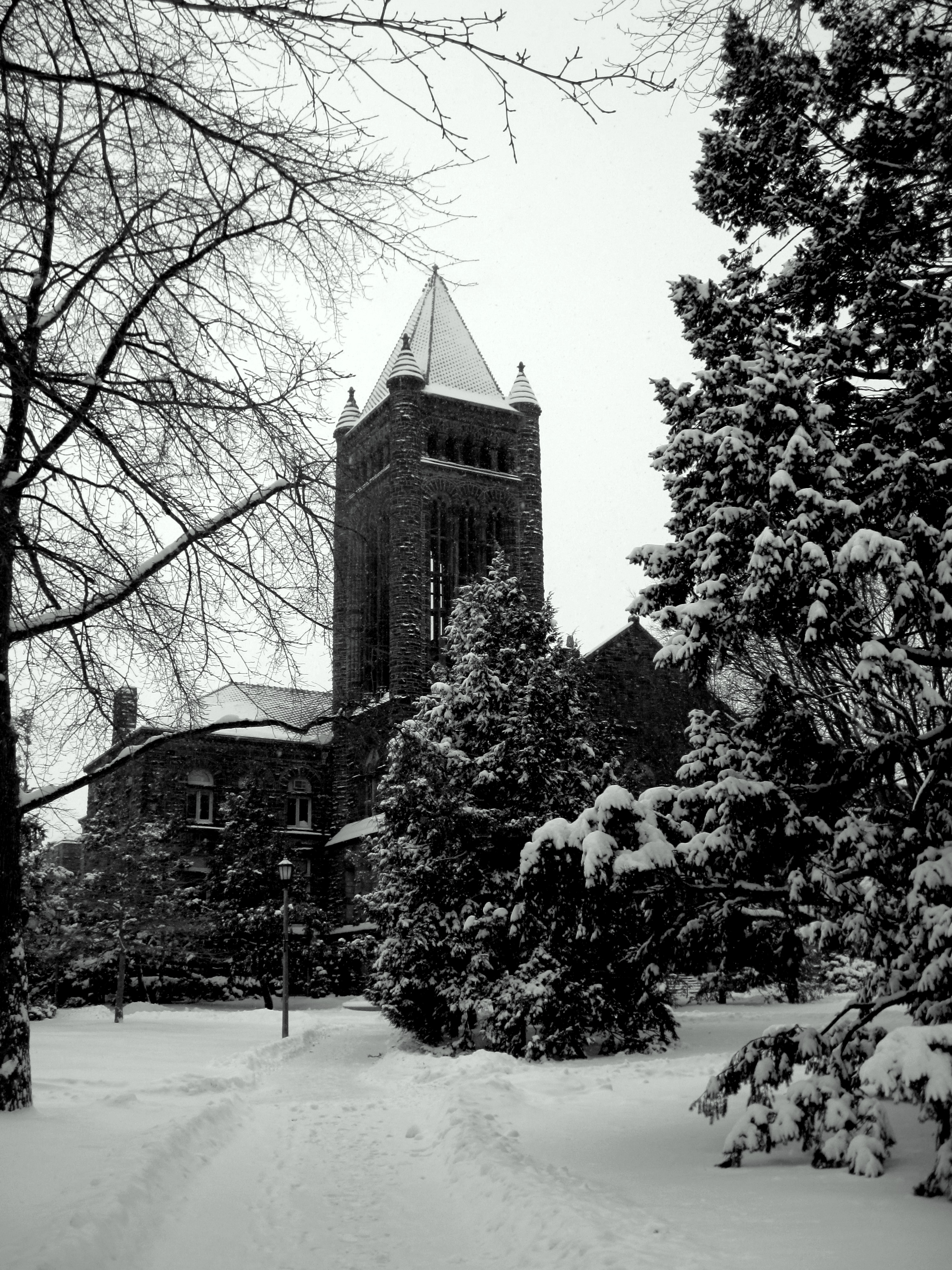
Altgeld Hall the original University Library

In the 1882 the College of Medicine was established. In the 1880s the institution experienced financial hardship which also resulted in the university changing names in 1885, from the Illinois Industrial University to the University of Illinois. The name change was then to avoid confusion with schools for delinquents. Then president Selim H. Peabody struggled to maintain academic standards and sell the university's lands. Peabody's methods came under attack by then students and developing alumni groups. This resulted in 1891, the Board of Trustees forced him out of office.

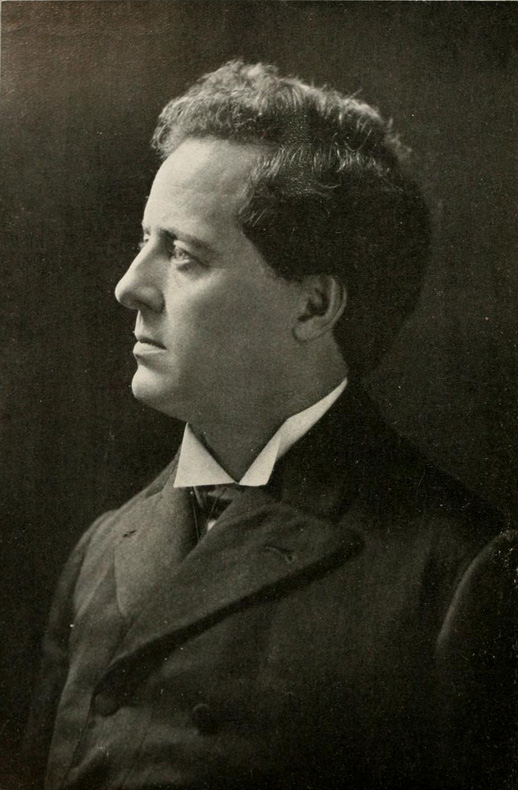
Edmund J. James

In a three-year search after Peabody's removal the university offered the presidency to such people as Woodrow Wilson and Washington Gladden. In addition to the search the university began a period of rapid growth under the guidance of Acting Regent Thomas J. Burrill. Eventually Andrew S. Draper, was selected by the trustees. Draper also broadened the university's offerings by adding schools of law, library science and medicine. In 1884, the university's first Native American student Carlos Montezuma (also known as Wassaja) graduates from the university. Wassaja is believed to be the first Native American ever to earn a Medical Degree in an American University.

Around 1889, enrollment, courses and departments increased. The agricultural (1888) and engineering Library and Information Science (1904) experiment stations brought public and national attention to the university's research interests. During this same time in 1893 the School of Library and Information Science was established followed by the College of Applied Health Sciences (1895) and College of Law (1897). Also, the now Altgeld Hall was built starting in 1896 was designed by Nathan Ricker and James McLaren White of the university's architecture department. The building was originally the University Library.

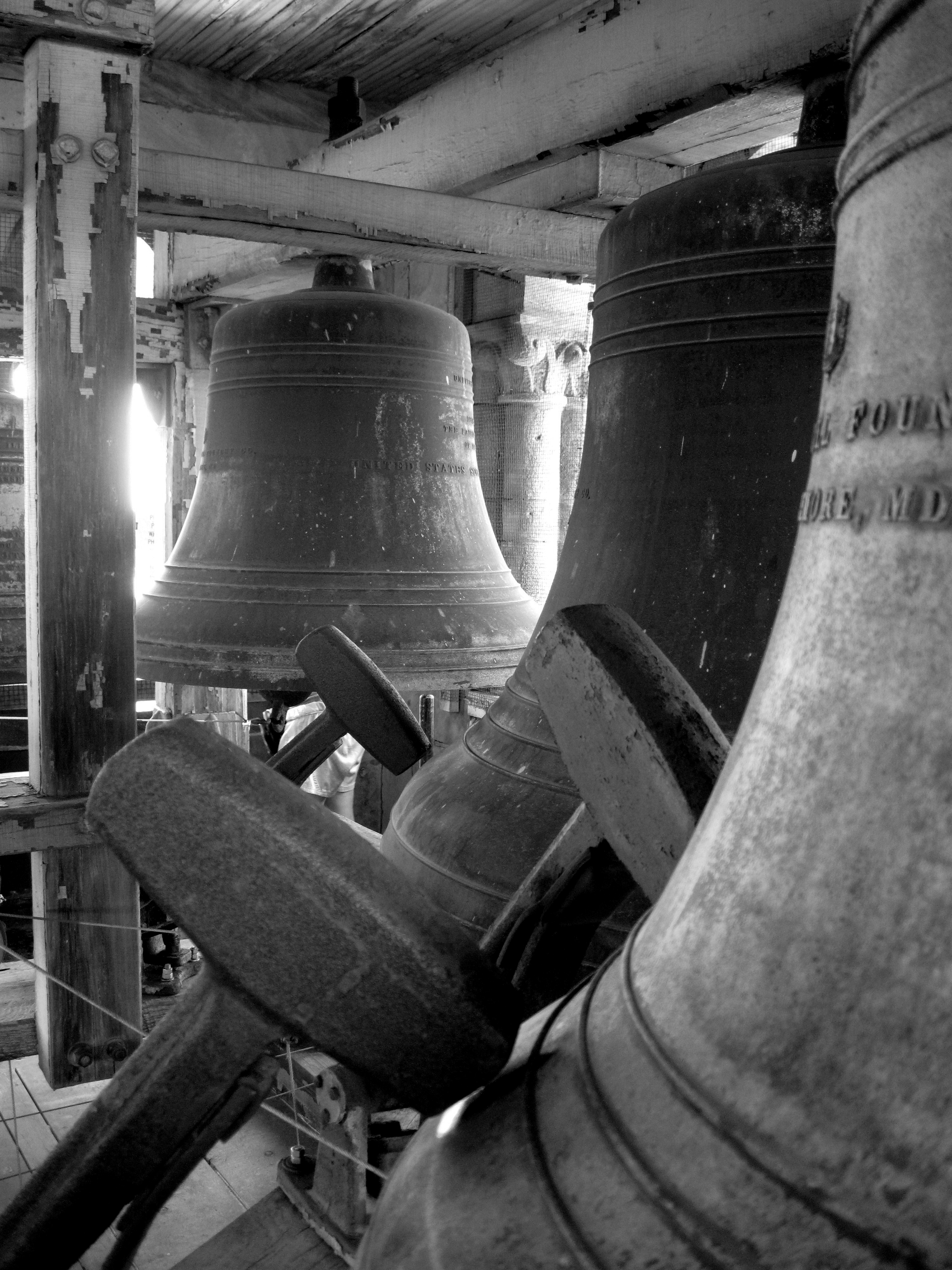
In 1920 the University Chime is added to the University Library bell tower (Altgeld Hall)

In 1899, Dean Eugene Davenport mobilized the state's agricultural interests to put the College of Agriculture on firm footing with a $150,000 appropriation for a building. This resulted in the development of colleges. Eventually Draper returned to New York in 1904.

Edmund J. James became president in 1904. During his presidency the now College of Education (1905), College of Liberal Arts and Sciences (1913) and the College of Business (1915) were established. The College of Liberal Arts and Sciences was created through the merger of the College of Literature and Arts and the College of Science. James is credited for building the foundation of the large Chinese international student population on campus. James established ties with China through the Chinese Minister to the United States. James and Wu Ting-Fang and created a direct connection between China and the Urbana campus. James established the first office for foreign students in the United States. Between 1911 and 1920, the University of Illinois was educating a third of all the Chinese students in the United States. Some student alumni from Illinois later influenced China's development, including Coching Chu (class of 1913) who is known as "Father of Chinese Meteorology". Edward Y. Ying (class of 1939) was influential in the planning of modern Shanghai. H.Y. Moh (class of 1913) later became a cotton manufacturer and government minister. In addition, during Jame's presidency, class rivalries and Bob Zuppke's winning football teams contributed to campus morale. The Altgeld Chimes were installed in 1920 in the University Library's tower (Altgeld Hall Tower)

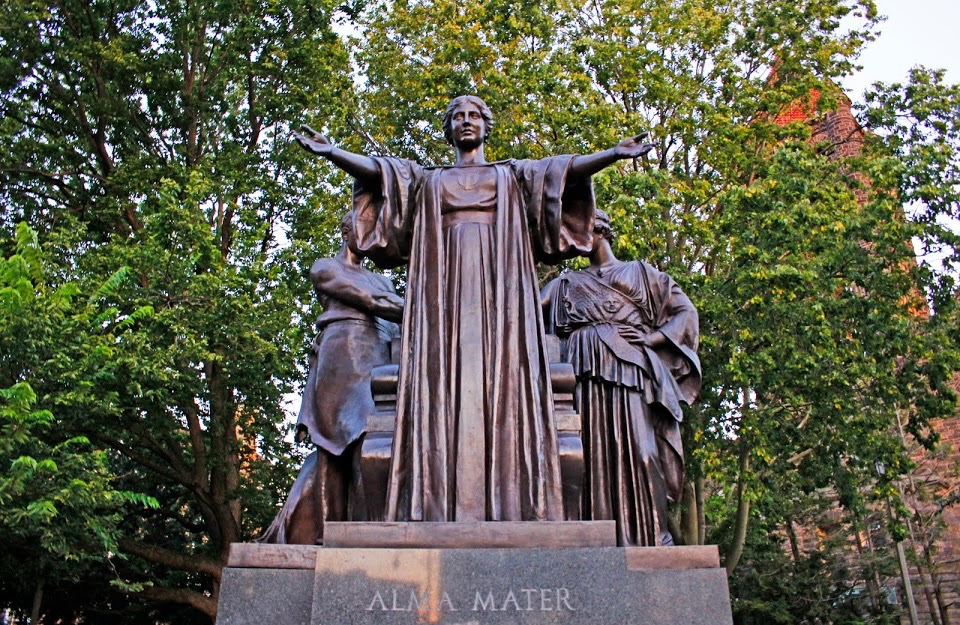
Alma Mater was dedicated on June 11, 1929

After James, administrator David Kinley served as president from 1920 to 1930. During this period of time, the university became known as one of the strongest fraternity campuses in the country. Prior to Kinley, Fraternity row was established in the early 1900s while sorority housing concentrated on John Street. The fraternity district moved southward towards Chalmers Street and most sororities moved to Urbana by the Greek house building boom in the 1920s. During Kinley's presidency the now College of Media (1927) was established. On June 11, 1929, the Alma Mater statue was unveiled. The Alma Mater was established by donations by the Alumni Fund and the classes of 1923–1929. The statue was originally stood behind the Auditorium until moved to its current location on August 22, 1962

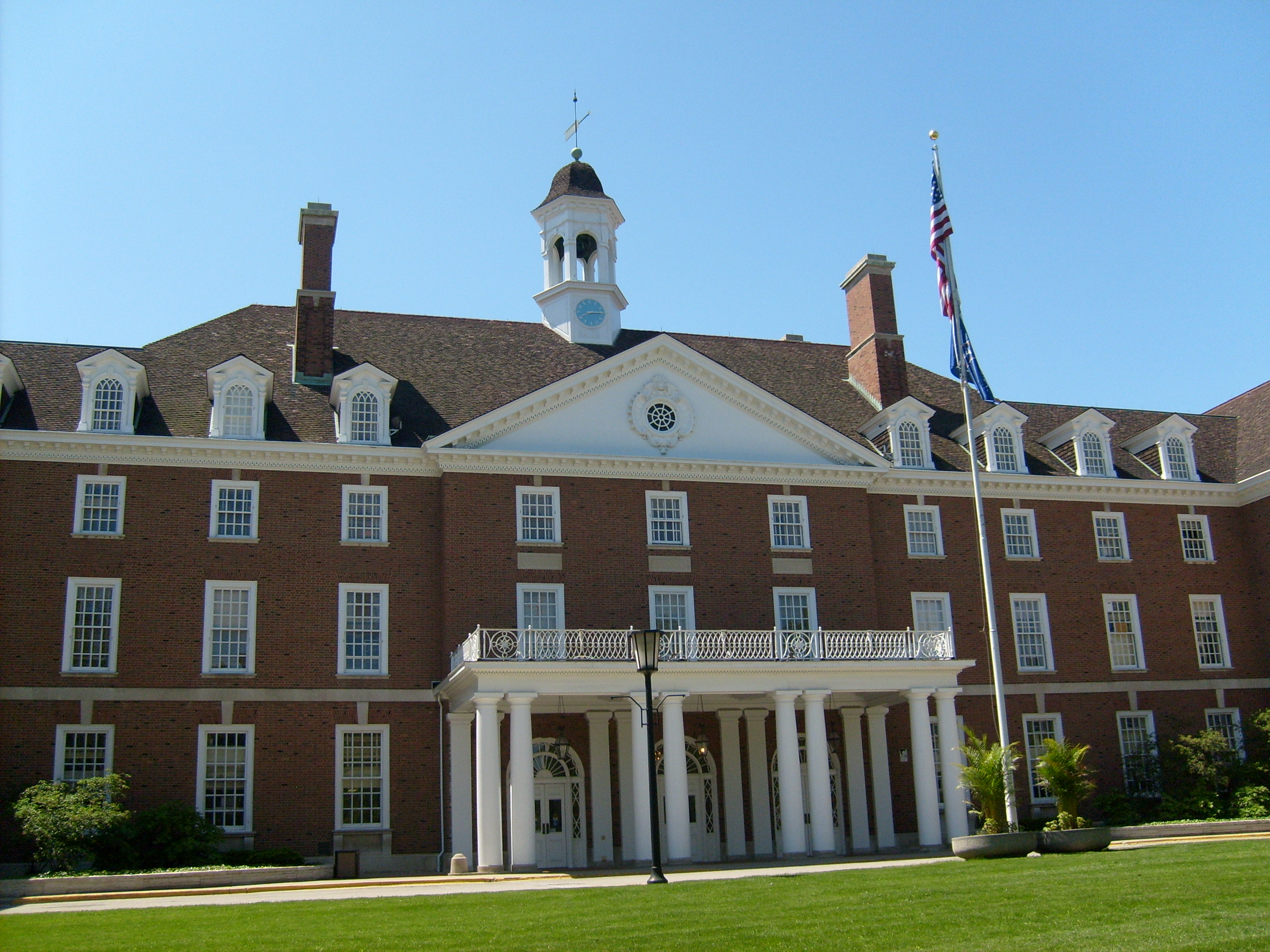
The Student Union Building called Illini Union

Presidents Harry Woodburn Chase followed in 1930 to 1933. During Chase' Presidency the now School of Social Work was established in 1931. President Arthur Hill Daniels served from 1933 to 1934 Like many universities, the economic depression slowed construction and expansion which was during President Arthur C. Willard's term. Willard served from 1934 to 1946. Even though expansion was slow, the old University Hall began to collapse in 1938. The university replaced the original university hall with Gregory Hall and the Illini Union. Pieces of the original University hall were eventually made in the Hallene Gateway. The Illini Union was the first building devoted to social and service functions for students.

== Post–World War II ==
In the years following World War II, under president David Henry the university experienced rapid growth. The enrollment doubled and the academic standing improved. This included the creation of Willard Airport, which was completed in 1945 and began service in 1954. Willard Airport, named for former University of Illinois president Arthur Cutts Willard, is located in Savoy.

This period was also marked by large growth in the Graduate College and increased federal support of scientific and technological research. What's more, during these times, the university experienced the turmoil common on many American campuses. Among these were the water fights of the fifties and sixties. The fights, also called water riots, began in 1957 and continued into the early sixties.

Leo Koch was a professor of biology at the university in the 1950s. His 1960 letter to the Daily Illini defending premarital sex provoked public outrage and prompted his firing from the university by President David Dodds Henry. Henry called the letter "offensive and repugnant." The UI Board of Trustees supported Henry, while the University of Illinois Senate voted to reprimand Koch but not to censure him. The firing and Koch's subsequent battle to be reinstated became a sensation in the press. Illinois was censured by the American Association of University Professors for the ouster.

The 1970s saw several progressive movements in serving various student groups such as Afro-American Studies Commission was established (1970), the university offering its first Women's Studies course (1970), University formed Office of Minority Student Affairs (1974), and La Casa Cultural Latina founded (1970). First official Quad Day was held in 1971 and the tradition still continues on the campus. WPGU-FM began stereo broadcasting and moved from Oglesby Hall to the new Century 21 buildings in 1972. Another impact (campus bar scene) on campus culture that still exists today began in 1976, when state law allowed 18-year-olds to drink beer and wine, The 1970s also saw several mentions to questioning of the use of Chief Illiniwek, such as an article, "A Challenge to the Chief," that appeared in the Illio (1975), calling for the removal of the Chief from University stationery. In addition, in 1978 three social work graduate students wrote a piece critical of Chief Illiniwek in The Daily Illini Forums. Another program that is still around since 1978 is the Student Organization Resource Fee (SORF) which is initiated to most various student groups and events on campus.

== Late 20th century ==
UNIVERSITY OF ILLINOIS, Urbana-Champaign
College/school	Year founded
Agriculture, Consumer, and Environmental Sciences	1867
Fine and Applied Arts	1867
Engineering (Grainger)	1868
Medicine	1882
Library and Information Science	1893
Applied Health Sciences	1895
Law	1897
Education	1905
Liberal Arts and Sciences	1913
Business (Gies)	1915
Media	1927
Social Work	1931
Aviation	1946
Labor and Employment Relations	1946
Veterinary Medicine	1948
Medicine (Carle Illinois)	2015

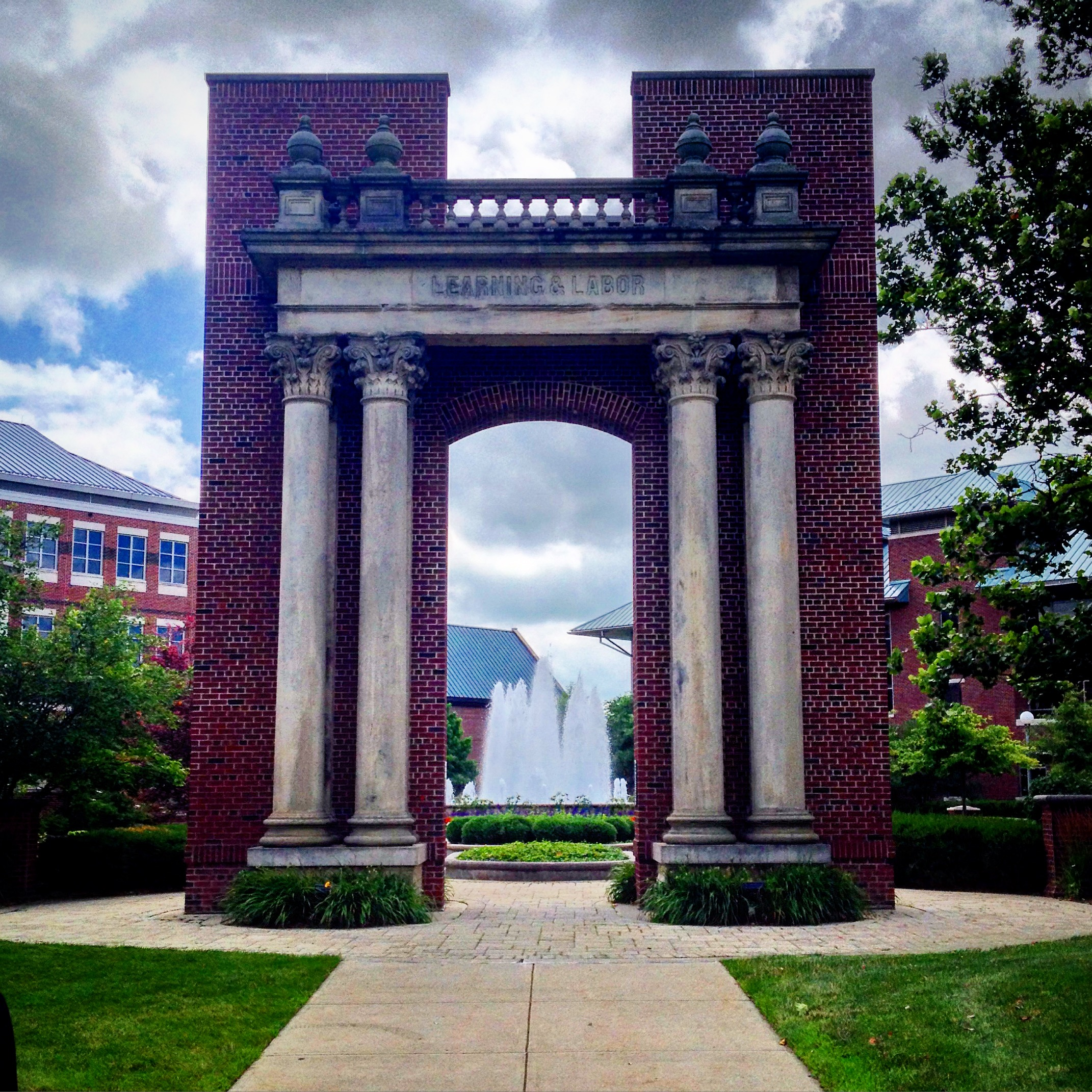
Hallene Gateway dedicated in 1998

In January 1998, President Bill Clinton visited the University of Illinois the day after making his State of the Union address before Congress. The campus airport gained some notoriety incident in which Air Force One became stuck in mud, requiring a backup aircraft to transport Clinton from a speaking engagement at the University of Illinois' Assembly Hall. The Air Force dispatched backup aircraft SAM26000, which first entered service during the Kennedy Administration and would be retired later in 1998.

On October 8, 1998, the Hallene Gateway Plaza was funded through alumni Alan M. and Phyllis Welsh Hallene. The Plaza features the original sandstone portal of the New Main University Hall. After original University Hall's deconstruction in the 1930s pieces were placed in storage until in 1994, it was rediscovered near maintenance sheds among "brush, raspberry brushes and small trees" and a backhoe had to be called in to help unearth it.

== 21st century ==
In past years, the state of Illinois supplied roughly two-thirds of the university's budget while the federal government funded 90% of research. In recent years, state support has declined from 4.5% of the state's tax appropriations in 1980 to 2.28% in 2011, a nearly 50% decline. As a result, the university's budget has strongly shifted away from relying on state support with nearly 84% of the budget now coming from other sources.

In 2007, the university announced the retirement of Chief Illiniwek using the basis that in 2005 the National Collegiate Athletic Association expressed disapproval of the university's use of a "hostile or abusive" image as its mascot. For years prior several groups protested that the use of a Native American figure and indigenous customs in such a manner was inappropriate and promoted ethnic stereotypes. The then University mascot, was typically portrayed by a student dressed in Sioux regalia. The controversy of retiring the mascot continued on campus with some students. Complaints continue that indigenous students felt insulted when images of the chief continue to be present on campus.

Series of investigative reports by the Chicago Tribune in 2009 noted that between 2005 and 2009 university trustees, president, chancellor, and other administrators pressured admissions officials into admitting under-qualified but politically well-connected applicants into the university. The scandal was later referred to as the "clout scandal".

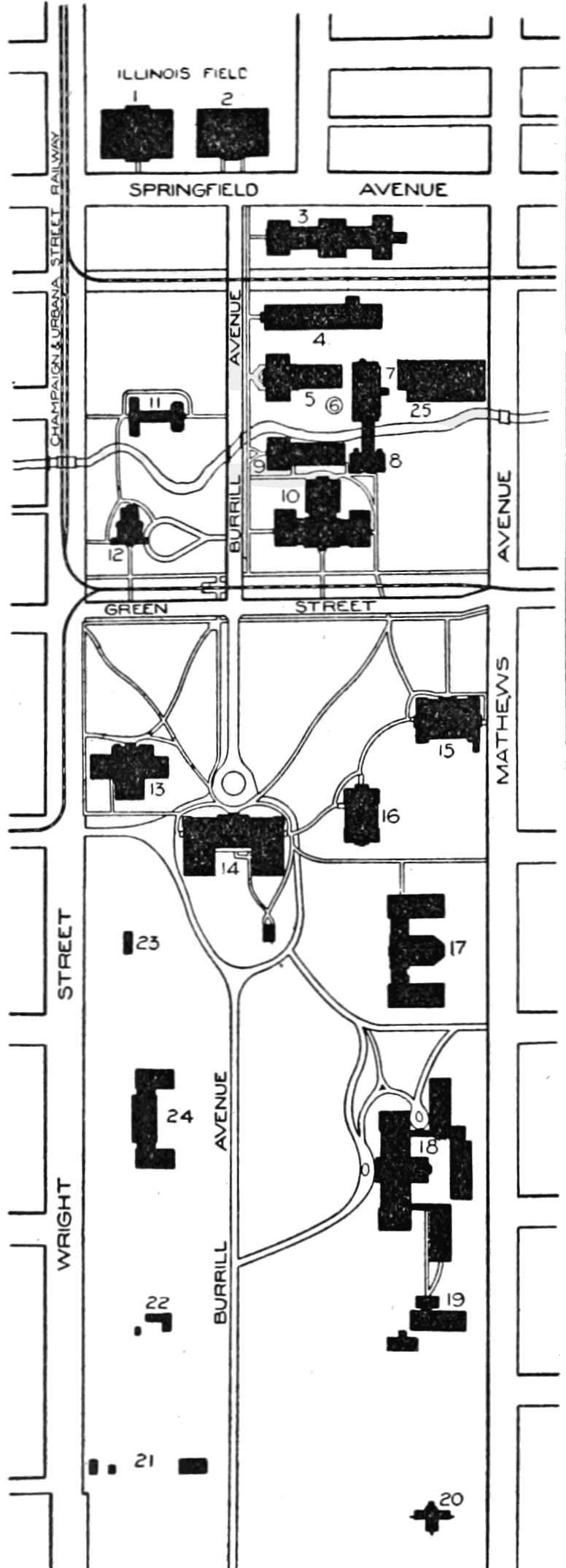
Campus depicted in 1905

Dr. Kenneth Howell, an adjunct professor teaching Introduction to Catholic Thought, was not rehired in 2010 after a complaint that his comments about homosexuality, especially in an email to all students in the class, were offensive. The Alliance Defense Fund took up Dr. Howell's case, stating that his dismissal was a violation of academic freedom and the First Amendment. The university's position, as stated by Ann Mester, associate dean of the College of Arts and Sciences, was that Dr. Howell's comments "violate university standards of inclusivity, which would then entitle us to have him discontinue his teaching arrangement with us." Eventually, Dr. Howell was reinstated by the University of Illinois as an adjunct instructor for the fall 2010 term to teach "Introduction to Catholicism". The matter was reviewed by the Academic Senate Committee on Academic Freedom and Tenure, which concluded that Dr. Howell was not granted due process, but that there could be grounds for dismissal through due process because of a lack of competency. The committee also concluded that students do not possess a right to not be offended by a professor's criticisms of their viewpoint.

In 2012, the campus received media attention when President Michael Hogan resigned after 20 months of his presidency. There were faculty who said the enrollment controversy during his presidency was symptomatic of a larger problem of what they described as "Hogan's arrogant, manipulative leadership style and bullying of people who disagreed with him." Which pointed to emails released under public records requests. The emails reflected him chastising the chancellor for her "inability to allay faculty concerns about the enrollment issue."

On September 12, 2014, talks began to introduce a new medical school to the university, which would be the first new college created in Urbana-Champaign in over 60 years. The proposed program would focus on intersection of engineering, technology and big data with health care. By drawing on the large number of engineering resources that the university is known for, the new college of medicine could "graduate physician-scientists who could work in clinical practice but also be positioned to develop new medical equipment and innovations." The proposal was reviewed by the Illinois Board of Trustees and unanimously approved on March 12, 2015.

In 2015, the University of Illinois announced that they would be naming its newest residence hall after Carlos Montezuma also known as Wassaja. Wassaja was the first Native American graduate and is believed to be one of the first Native Americans to receive a medical degree from an American university. The university also made national headlines between 2013 and 2015, the then Chancellor Phyllis Wise fired faculty member Dr. Steven Salaita. Wise, made the decision after complaints about Salaita's Twitter account. The decision was criticized by various academic organizations as inconsistent with norms of academic freedom. The controversy of Salaita along with problems with establishing the medical program were believed to be connect with Wise's resignation. Beyond Salaita, the university also had other controversial faculty appointments or terminations. Which include the hiring and support of James Kilgore in 2014 who was a former militant with the Symbionese Liberation Army. Who served as a research scholar and at the university's Center for African Studies.

== Campus ==
The Main Quadrangle at the University of Illinois Urbana-Champaign comprises the main campus of the university. It is a quadrangle surrounded by buildings of the College of Liberal Arts and Sciences (LAS) and is the center of campus activities.

Several architects had been instrumental in the building of the campus. These include Ernest L Stouffer, Nathan Clifford Ricker, Charles A. Platt, James White, Clarence Howard Blackall, Holabird & Roche, and W.C. Zimmerman. Various campus buildings have been placed on the National Register of Historic Places; these include the Mumford House, Freer Hall, Evans Hall, Busey Hall, Main Library, Altgeld Hall, Round Barns, Kenney Gymnasium, Natural History Building, and Harker Hall. In addition, the Morrow Plots and the University of Illinois Observatory are designated as the National Historic Landmark.

== See also ==
- WPGU – student-run commercial radio station
- List of University of Illinois Urbana-Champaign people – List of notable University of Illinois People
