= Paula Allen-Meares =

American academic (born 1948)

6th Chancellor of the University of Illinois Chicago
- In office January 2009 – January 2015
- Preceded by: Sylvia Manning; Rick Gislason (interim)
- Succeeded by: Rick Gislason (interim); Michael Amiridis

Personal details
- Born: 1948 (age 77–78)
- Education: State University of New York at Buffalo (BS); University of Illinois Urbana-Champaign (MSW, PhD)

Academic background
- Thesis: A Current Analysis of School Social Work Tasks and Its Implication for Differential Staffing Patterns (1975)

Academic work
- Discipline: Social work
- Institutions: University of Illinois Urbana-Champaign; University of Michigan; University of Illinois Chicago

Paula G. Allen-Meares (born 1948) is an American academic who served as the chancellor of the University of Illinois Chicago from 2009 to 2015. In 2010, she was also appointed Vice President of the University of Illinois. She has a background in social work, mental health, and higher education.

Allen-Meares was raised in Buffalo, New York. She completed her undergraduate education at SUNY Buffalo, and then undertook postgraduate studies in social work at the University of Illinois at Urbana–Champaign (UIUC). While completing her doctorate, she worked for the Illinois Department of Children and Family Services. She joined the UIUC faculty in 1975, and in 1990 was made dean of the School of Social Work. In 1993, Allen-Meares joined the University of Michigan as dean of the School of Social Work. She also served as chair of the University Health Sciences Council. During her tenure, the School of Social Work's endowment increased from $1 million to $42.3 million.

Allen-Meares's appointment as chancellor of the University of Illinois Chicago (UIC) was announced in June 2008, and her term commenced in January 2009. During her tenure, student enrollment and research funding increased by 8% and 14%, respectively. Among U.S. universities, UIC ranked 52^{nd} in federal research funding. Allen-Meares also worked to increase the diversity of students and faculty, invested in research supporting start-up companies, reduced campus energy consumption, and oversaw the creation of a cross-college bioengineering partnership. She led UIC's "Brilliant Futures" fundraising campaign, which raised $678 million, exceeding its fundraising goal and becoming the most successful in the University's history.

Her tenure was also marked by challenges, including the formation of a faculty union at UIC. At the time, the University enrolled 27,589 students and employed 1,727 instructional faculty. During her chancellorship, there were several leadership transitions in the University of Illinois System, including the presidencies of B. Joseph White, Stanley O. Ikenberry, Michael J. Hogan, and Robert A. Easter. In November 2013, the University of Illinois Board of Trustees approved a one-year extension of her contract. Following the vote, Board Chairman Christopher Kennedy described Allen-Meares as "highly respected" in Chicago and "a wonderful asset" to the University.Chancellor Allen-Meares also directed the UIC Student Success Plan, a campus-wide initiative focused on improving undergraduate student outcomes, including retention, graduation, and future employment across eight strategic areas.

As chancellor, she unsuccessfully advocated for UIC to host the Barack Obama Presidential Center. Allen-Meares's initial five-year term was extended to January 2015, but not renewed thereafter; in August 2014, the UIC faculty senate had passed a motion of no confidence 44–9. She received an exit bonus of $98,440 on top of a $437,244 annual salary, which was criticized by faculty representatives. As of 2025, the UIC Chancellor and University of Illinois System Vice President received compensation of $710,700.

== See also ==
- List of women presidents or chancellors of co-ed colleges and universities
