= Newton Alonzo Wells =

American visual artist and educator (1852–1923)

- Born: April 9, 1852; Lisbon, New York, U.S.
- Died: January 16, 1923; Algeria
- Education: Académie Julian
- Alma mater: Syracuse University
- Occupation(s): Artist, professor
- Spouse: Flora A. Ellis
- Children: 2

Newton Alonzo Wells (April 9, 1852 – January 16, 1923) was an American artist and professor of art. Wells is known for his portrait paintings, murals, etchings, and sculptures; as well as decorative art. He was a professor emeritus at the University of Illinois Urbana-Champaign (UIUC).

== Early life and education ==
Newton Alonzo Wells was born on April 9, 1852, in Lisbon, New York. He attended high school at Franklin Academy in Malone, New York.

He graduated from Syracuse University (BFA degree 1877, and MFA degree 1880). Wells also studied art and painting at Académie Julian in Paris under Jean-Joseph Benjamin-Constant, and William-Adolphe Bouguereau.

In 1878, he married Flora A. Ellis. They had a son and a daughter.

== Career ==
Wells taught at Union College in Schenectady, New York from 1877 to 1879; and was a professor of drawing at Syracuse University from 1879 to 1889. He was Dean of the school of art at Western Reserve University from 1889 to 1890. After serving as Dean, he took a year off and worked as an artist in Europe, including exhibiting his work at the annual Salon in Paris in 1896–1897.

In 1899, Wells became a professor at the University of Illinois Urbana-Champaign (UIUC), a position he held until September 1919, when he retired as professor emeritus.

The DeSoto County Courthouse in Hernando, Mississippi, has murals by Wells (depicting Hernando de Soto's journey), they were painted in 1903 and were originally in the Gayoso Hotel in Memphis, Tennessee.

== Death and legacy ==
He died on January 16, 1923, in Algeria, while traveling.

His artwork is included in museum and library collections including at the Smithsonian American Art Museum, the Cornell University libraries, and the Syracuse University Art Museum. Syracuse University Libraries also has a collection of his papers in the archives.

== List of works ==
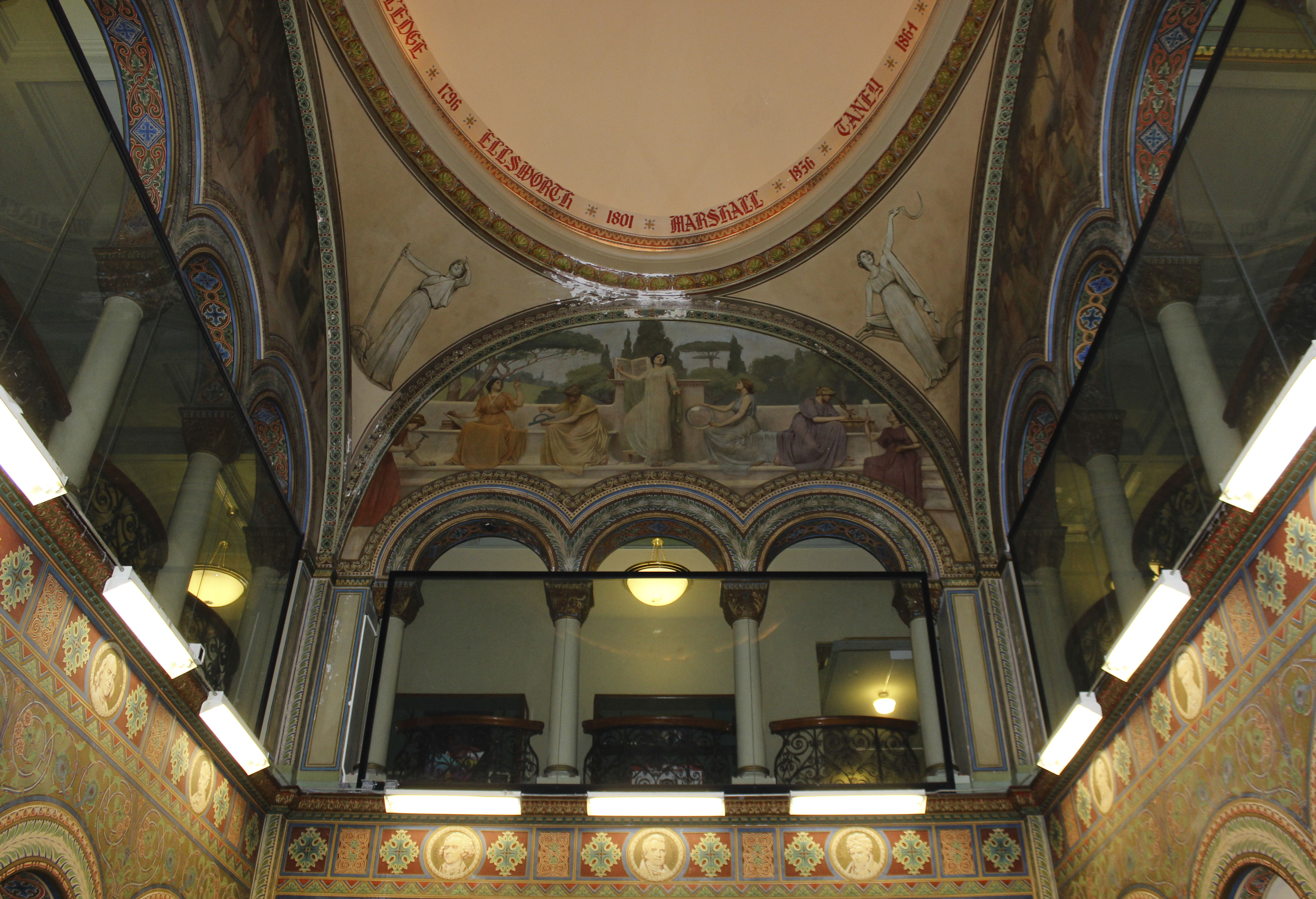
"The Laboratory of Minerva" ceiling mural (1898–1899) by Wells in the Mathematics Library, Altgeld Hall at University of Illinois Urbana-Champaign

- Charles Chauncey Shackford Portrait (1884), oil painting, at Cornell University Libraries
- Portrait of Chief Justice George Franklin Comstock (c. 1885), oil painting, at Syracuse University Art Museum
- The Housewife (1888), oil painting, at Syracuse University Art Museum
- Portrait of the Honorable David Decker (1889), oil painting, at Syracuse University Art Museum
- Portrait of Thomas W. Durston (1890), oil painting
- Portrait of Dr. Charles N. Sims (1893), oil painting, at Syracuse University Art Museum
- Portrait of Chancellor Alexander Winchell (1893), oil painting, at Syracuse University Art Museum
- The Laboratory of Minerva, four murals in the dome (1898–1899) in Altgeld Hall at University of Illinois Urbana-Champaign
- murals (1903) for the Gayoso Hotel in Memphis, now at the DeSoto County Courthouse in Hernando, Mississippi
- Spring (1913) color etching with aquatint and chine-collé, at Smithsonian American Art Museum
- Portrait of N. Clifford Ricker (1917) etching, at Smithsonian American Art Museum
- A Man (1917) etching, at Smithsonian American Art Museum
- Portrait of Dr. Burrill (1917) etching, at Smithsonian American Art Museum
