= GSLIS =

GSLIS /ˈɡɪslɪs/ may refer to a number of schools with the name "Graduate School of Library and Information Science":

- Dominican University Graduate School of Library and Information Science, in River Forest, Illinois
- Simmons College Graduate School of Library and Information Science, in Boston, Massachusetts
- University of Illinois at Urbana-Champaign Graduate School of Library and Information Science, in Champaign, Illinois.
- University of Rhode Island Graduate School of Library and Information Studies (GSLIS), in Kingston, Rhode Island
