= Lisbon, New York =

- Town
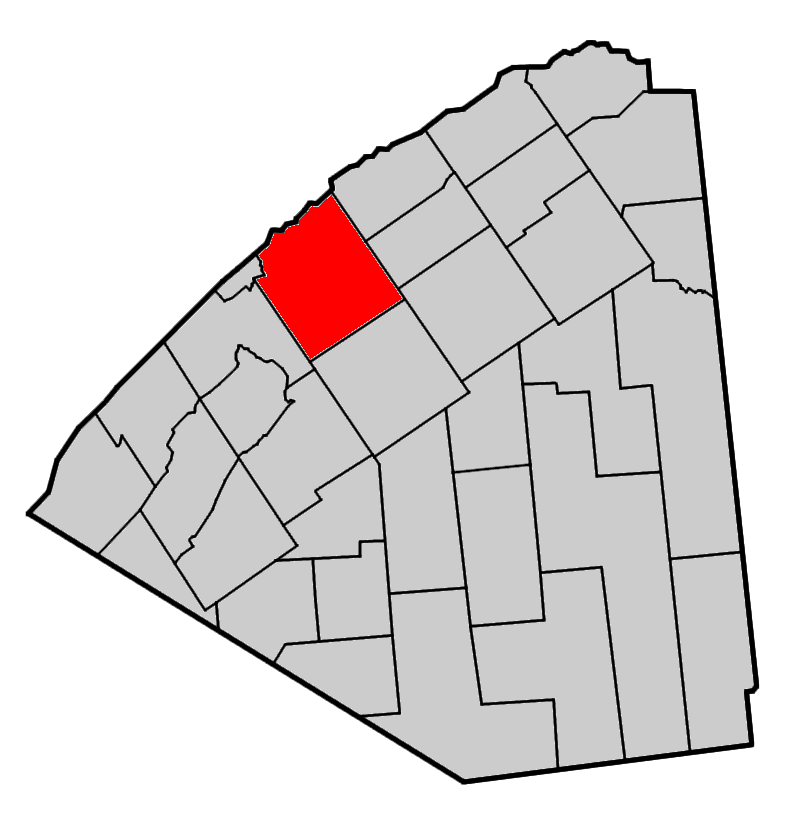
- Map highlighting Lisbon's location within St. Lawrence County.

- Location within the state of New York
- Coordinates: 44°42′10″N 75°19′32″W
- Country: United States
- State: New York
- County: St. Lawrence

Area
  - Total: 113.92 sq mi (295.04 km^{2})
  - Land: 108.28 sq mi (280.44 km^{2})
  - Water: 5.64 sq mi (14.60 km^{2})
- Elevation: 344 ft (105 m)

Population (2020)
  - Total: 4,221
  - Density: 37.5/sq mi (14.49/km^{2})
- Time zone: UTC-5 (Eastern (EST))
  - Summer (DST): UTC-4 (EDT)
- FIPS code: 36-42631
- GNIS feature ID: 0979154
- Website: https://www.townoflisbonny.org/

Lisbon is a town in St. Lawrence County, New York, United States. The population was 4,102 at the 2010 census.

The town is named after Lisburn, a town in the North of Ireland where several of the early settlers of the town were from. is in the northern part of the county and is northwest of Canton.

== History ==
The area along the St. Lawrence River had been occupied by Iroquoian peoples, as noted by early French explorers. They are thought to have been defeated by members of the Five Nations of the Iroquois Confederacy who dominated the area of present-day New York state west of Albany. They preserved this area as hunting ground and conducted fur trading with French colonists along the river.

The first European-American settlers arrived around 1789. Many migrants arrived in the area from New England and were eager to buy land. Demand had risen during the American Revolution. Macomb and his partners believed that upstate New York was strategic for prosperous development, as they were depending on the growing trade with Canada across the St. Lawrence River and Lake Ontario.

Two factors worked against this: due to rising tensions with Great Britain, the US government passed the Embargo Act of 1807, prohibiting trade with Britain (and including the Canadian colonies. While smuggling across the lakes and rivers occurred, the act suppressed trade with Canada, as did the War of 1812 and restrictions afterward. The completion of the Erie Canal in 1824 shifted growth and development to the Great Lakes area, as it opened trade from that area through Central New York, connecting with the Hudson River and New York City. Migrant populations were drawn to the west.

The Town of Lisbon was the first town in the county; it was formed in 1801, before the county was established. The former Lisbon Railroad Depot, now operated as the town museum, was listed on the National Register of Historic Places in 2000. Also listed are the Lisbon Town Hall, the United Presbyterian Church, and the Hepburn Library of Lisbon. The Presbyterian Church, essentially the national church of Scotland, was a sign of settlement in the area by ethnic Scots-Irish people from Scotland and Ireland.

== Geography ==
According to the United States Census Bureau, the town has a total area of 113.7 square miles (294 km^{2}), of which 108.2 square miles (280 km^{2}) is land and 5.4 square miles (14 km^{2}) (4.78%) is water. The northern town line is marked by the St. Lawrence River, which is the international border with Canada, the Province of Ontario.

The town borders Ogdensburg, New York at its northwest corner. New York State Route 37 and New York State Route 68 are highways that converge west of the town in Ogdensburg. NY-37 follows the south bank of St. Lawrence River in a northeasterly direction, and NY-68 runs southeasterly to Canton.

== Demographics ==
Historical population
Census	Pop.	Note	%±
1820	930		—
1830	1,891		103.3%
1840	3,508		85.5%
1850	5,295		50.9%
1860	5,640		6.5%
1870	4,475		−20.7%
1880	4,297		−4.0%
1890	3,809		−11.4%
1900	5,255		38.0%
1910	2,981		−43.3%
1920	2,673		−10.3%
1930	2,642		−1.2%
1940	2,630		−0.5%
1950	2,557		−2.8%
1960	3,040		18.9%
1970	3,271		7.6%
1980	3,548		8.5%
1990	3,746		5.6%
2000	4,047		8.0%
2010	4,102		1.4%
2020	4,221		2.9%

As of the census of 2000, there were 4,047 people, 1,468 households, and 1,101 families residing in the town. The population density was 37.4 inhabitants per square mile (14.4/km^{2}). There were 1,719 housing units at an average density of 15.9 per square mile (6.1/km^{2}). The racial makeup of the town was 98.27% White, 0.12% African American, 0.57% Native American, 0.17% Asian, 0.07% from other races, and 0.79% from two or more races. Hispanic or Latino of any race were 0.52% of the population.

There were 1,468 households, out of which 36.4% had children under the age of 18 living with them, 60.4% were married couples living together, 9.4% had a female householder with no husband present, and 25.0% were non-families. 19.5% of all households were made up of individuals, and 7.6% had someone living alone who was 65 years of age or older. The average household size was 2.75 and the average family size was 3.10.

In the town, the population was spread out, with 27.9% under the age of 18, 8.0% from 18 to 24, 27.6% from 25 to 44, 24.6% from 45 to 64, and 12.0% who were 65 years of age or older. The median age was 37 years. For every 100 females, there were 100.0 males. For every 100 females age 18 and over, there were 96.4 males.

The median income for a household in the town was $35,772, and the median income for a family was $38,384. Males had a median income of $30,558 versus $25,525 for females. The per capita income for the town was $15,784. About 7.5% of families and 14.1% of the population were below the poverty line, including 21.5% of those under age 18 and 4.5% of those age 65 or over.

== Notable people ==
- Rick Carlisle – Former NBA player and current coach of the Indiana Pacers
- Newton Alonzo Wells (1852–1923) American visual artist and educator
- Bill Wimble – hall of fame automobile racing driver

== Communities and locations in the Town of Lisbon ==
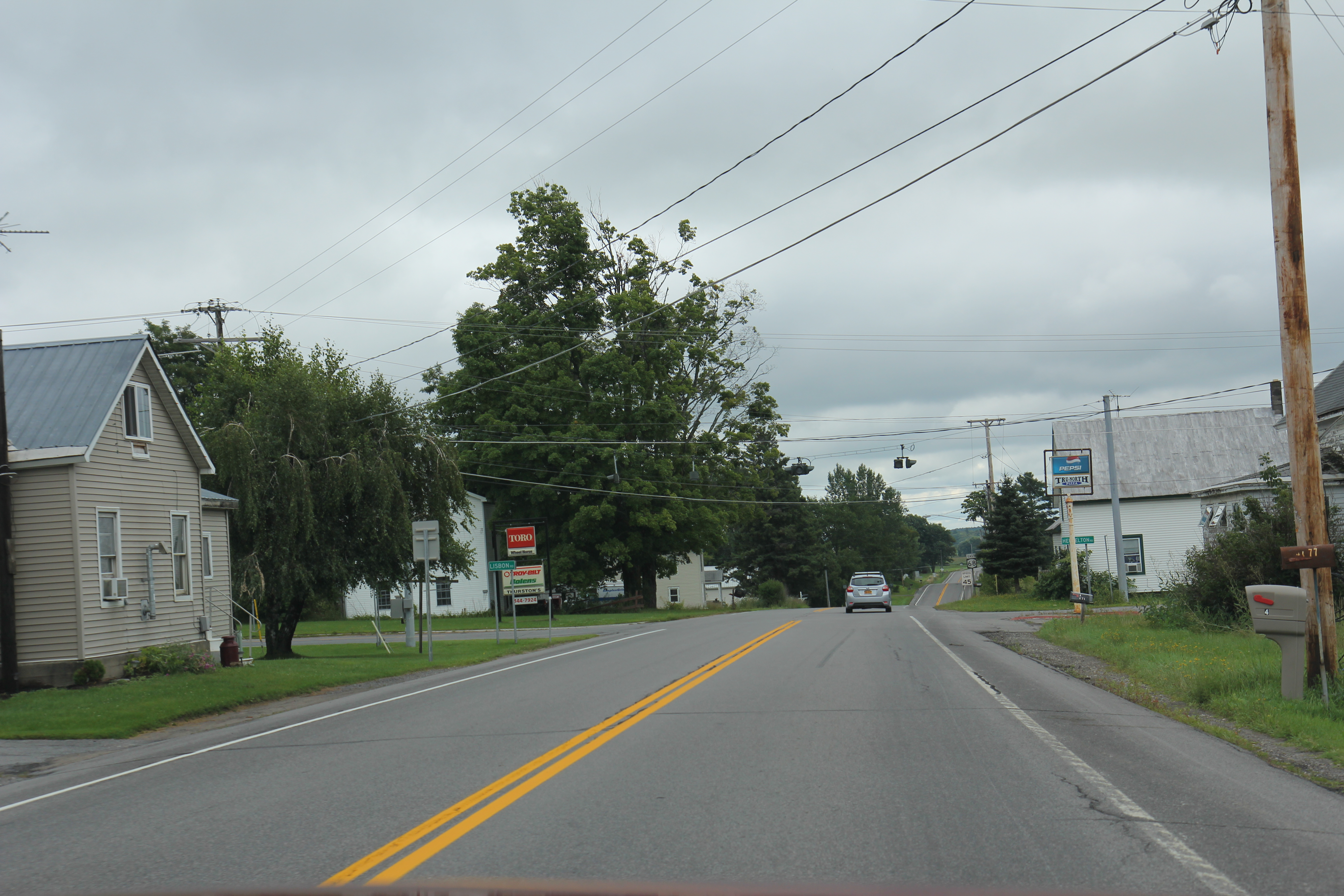
Downtown Flackville

- Benedict Island – An island in the St. Lawrence River between Galop Island and the mainland.
- Chimney Island – A small island in the St. Lawrence River north of Chimney Point.
- Chimney Point – A projection into the St. Lawrence River and the location of the Ogdensburg Prescott International Bridge.
- Flackville – A hamlet in the western part of the town on NY-68 at County Road 10.
- Galop Island – An island in the St. Lawrence River, formerly called Isle au Gallaup by French colonists.
- Galop Island State Park – A state park on Galop Island.
- Gregory Corners – A location east of Lisbon village at the junction of County Roads 27 and 30.
- Hague Crossing – A hamlet near the northeastern town line on County Road 30.
- Lisbon – The hamlet of Lisbon is on County Road 10 (Lisbon Road) at the junction of County Road 27 (Morley-Lisbon Road) near the center of the town.
- North Corners – A location north of Lisbon village at County Roads 27 and 28.
- Pine Grove – A hamlet near the northeastern town line on County Road 28 at County Road 11.
- Red Mills – A hamlet near the St. Lawrence River on NY-37, formerly known as Galloupville.
- Sparrowhawk Point – A location on the south bank of the St. Lawrence River.
