= United Presbyterian Church (Lisbon, New York) =

Historic church in New York, United States

- U.S. National Register of Historic Places
- Location within New York Location within the United States
- Location: 26 Church St., Lisbon, New York
- Coordinates: 44°43′47″N 75°19′17″W
- Area: less than one acre
- Built: 1857
- Architect: Horwood, H.J.
- Architectural style: Mid-late 19th Century
- NRHP reference No.: 05001124
- Added to NRHP: October 05, 2005

United Presbyterian Church is an historic Presbyterian church located at Lisbon in St. Lawrence County, New York. It was built in 1857 and is a rectangular gable roofed frame building, three bays wide and four bays deep. It was modified and enlarged in the late 19th century and early 20th century. Attached to the main block is a two-story Sunday school wing.

It was listed on the National Register of Historic Places in 2007.
