= Galop Island =

Island in St. Lawrence County, New York, United States

- Location within New York

Geography
- Location: St. Lawrence River
- Coordinates: 44°45′55″N 75°24′02″W
- Area: 675 acres (273 ha)
- Highest elevation: 289 ft (88.1 m)

Administration
- United States
- State: New York
- County: St. Lawrence
- Town: Lisbon
- Owner: New York Power Authority

Galop Island is an uninhabited island in the Saint Lawrence River located in St. Lawrence County, northeast of Ogdensburg, New York. The 675-acre (2.73 km^{2}) island is owned by the New York Power Authority and managed by the New York State Office of Parks, Recreation and Historic Preservation as the undeveloped Galop Island State Park.

Galop Island has historically been known by a variety of names, including Isle Aux Galloup, Gallou Island, Butternut Island, Dillingham Island, Dixon Island, Lalone Island, Lotus Island, Round Island, Sears Island, Big Island, and Twin Island.

== Wildlife habitat ==
The island contains a mixture of shrubs, open areas and mature forests. It is a known wintering area for bald eagles. A nearby area of the Saint Lawrence River, known as the Galop Island Pools, remains free of ice during the winter due to strong river currents and turbulence. The approximately 1,800 acres (7.3 km^{2}) of open water is utilized by eagles and other migratory birds as a winter food source. The availability of open water during the winter is limited within the region; only three other areas within the Saint Lawrence River remain similarly free of ice.

Approximately 1,000 acres (4.0 km^{2}) of shallow bays along the river channel south of the island include spawning habitat for muskellunge, causing the area to be a regionally important sport fishing destination. The large, protected, shallow bays with variable water velocities found offshore from Galop Island are rare within the region. The bays additionally support migratory waterfowl during the spring and fall, and additional fish species, including brown bullhead, smallmouth bass, and yellow perch, are abundant.

== See also ==
- List of New York state parks
