= Lincoln Hall (University of Illinois Urbana-Champaign) =

Coordinates: 40°06′24″N 88°13′42″W

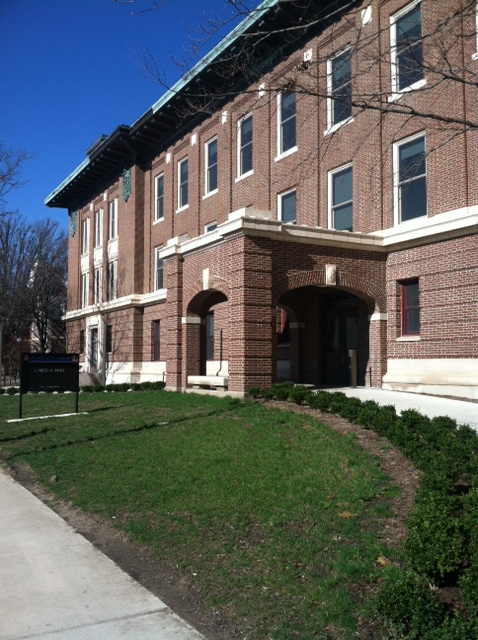
- Lincoln Hall, viewed from the Wright Street (west) side.
- Interactive map of the Lincoln Hall area

General information
- Architectural style: Georgian Revival
- Location: Campus of the University of Illinois Urbana-Champaign, 702 S Wright Street, Urbana, Illinois, United States of America
- Current tenants: University of Illinois College of Liberal Arts and Sciences
- Inaugurated: February 12, 1913

Lincoln Hall is one of the eleven buildings that make up the Main Quad of the University of Illinois Urbana-Champaign (UIUC). The building's exterior depicts scenes of the life of Abraham Lincoln and is located on the southwest corner of the Quad. The building is home of the Liberal Arts and Science College. Lincoln Hall contains four floors which includes classrooms, a theater, conference rooms, and offices for faculty. Specifically, the Department of Communication, Department of Sociology, several LAS administrative offices, including Student Academic Affairs and the Dean's Office reside in Lincoln Hall (about 250 people). Over the years, Lincoln Hall has emerged as the second most used classroom building on campus, with 350 sections of classes held there each semester. Almost every student will have taken a class in Lincoln Hall by graduation.

Lincoln Hall was built in 1909 after the Illinois State Legislature approved the $250,000 project. It was ready for occupation in 1911, and was finally dedicated on February 12, 1913. The prairie-influenced Italian design honors President Abraham Lincoln. Lincoln Hall is considered architecturally innovative and qualifies for the National Registrar of Historic Places.

A bronze plaque with the text of the Gettysburg Address hangs in the East entrance of the hall. Also in the entryway is a bronze bust of Lincoln made by Hermon Atkins MacNeil. The nose is more polished than the rest of the sculpture because many students rub it for good luck. 10 scenic panels from the life of Lincoln are on the east (Quad) exterior side of the four-story building. These panels were executed and signed by sculptor Kristian Schneider who worked for the American Terra Cotta and Ceramic Company in Crystal Lake, Ill. Schneider is best known as the sculptor who was in charge of executing the work for American architect Louis Sullivan from the time of the Auditorium Building until his death in 1924.

On the north and south sides it has 20 quotes (10 on each side) from Lincoln's speeches and letters. Half the quotes were added in the 1929 expansion of the building. The original 10 quotes (five on each side) are each flanked by two medallion portraits (20 portraits in all) of men who played prominent roles in Lincoln's life. There are also at least 69 owl figures adorning the building. The South courtyard is a memorial to those University of Illinois students who died in the First World War, dedicated by the classes of 1918 and 1919.

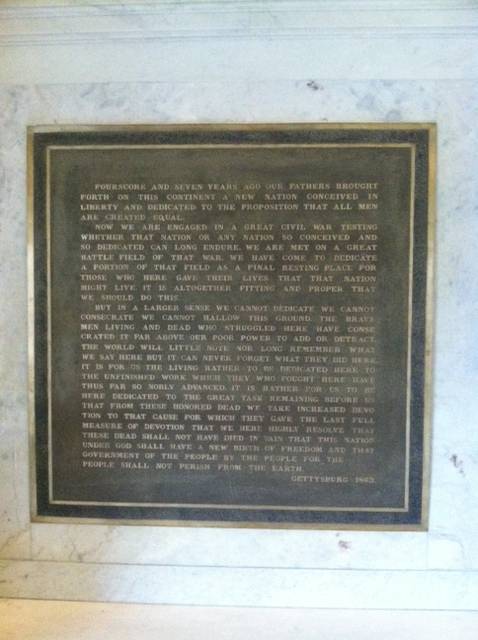
The plaque of the Gettysburg Address in the East Foyer

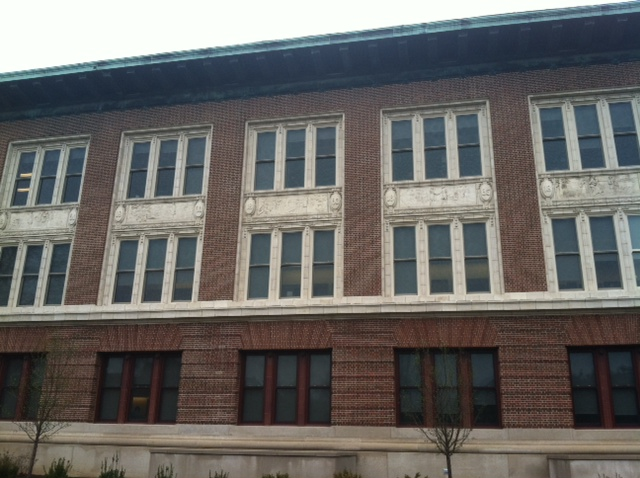
Five of the 10 scenic panels of Lincoln's life on the East side of the exterior of Lincoln Hall

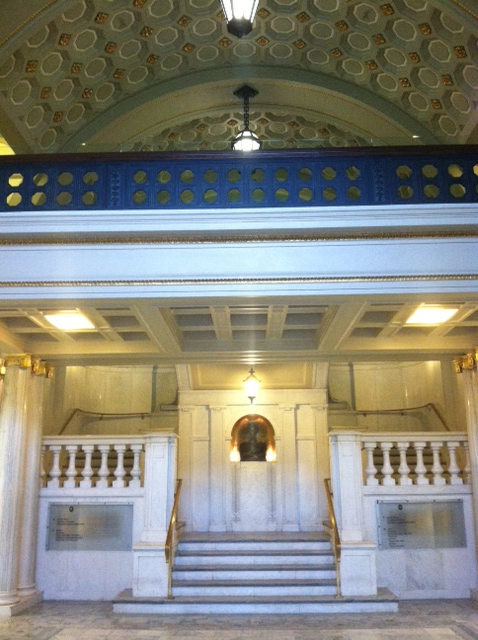
The restored East Foyer of Lincoln Hall, with the bust of Lincoln still overlooking

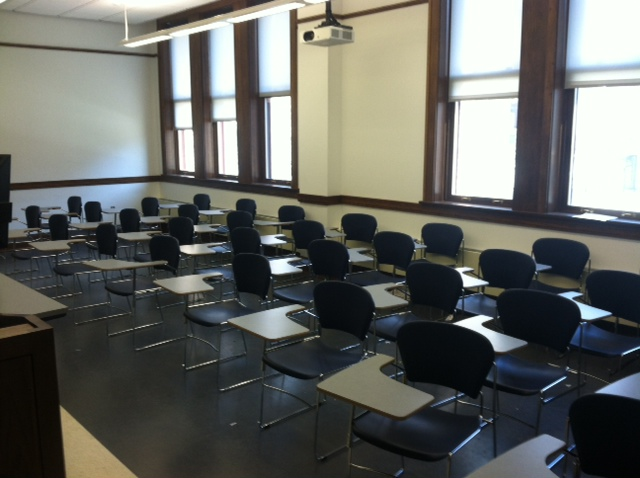
A new classroom in Lincoln Hall

There was an addition to Lincoln Hall in 1929. The renovation cost $500,000 and extended the building west to Wright Street and added a theater. Also, in 1950 Lincoln Hall became the first building on campus with wheel-chair assessable ramps.

In 2005, the Landmarks Preservation Council of Illinois placed Lincoln Hall on its yearly Ten Most Endangered list. In July 2009, Governor Pat Quinn approved $60.3 million for the renovation of Lincoln Hall. The University of Illinois pledged to pay $6 million for the renovation. The plan brought the building up to the contemporary building code. The renovated building was ready for occupancy in July 2012.

The entire exterior of the building was restored including the slate of roof tiles, windows, brick mortar, detailing, and the 30 terra cotta panels depicting quotes and portraits from Abraham Lincoln's life. On the Wright Street side of the building, the old carriage porch was restored into the formal entrance for the building.

As for the interior of Lincoln Hall, the theater, east foyer, and some detailing were restored. The Lincoln Hall Theater was returned to its original look by using historical colors and preserving the decorative iron ends of seats, the tablets, and frescoes. A new stage curtain, seats, stage equipment, projectors, and a control room were added. The refinishing of the interior of Lincoln Hall included 5,000 feet of original white oak paneling, baseboard, door cast, and trim. In the entrance foyer from the Quad, the barrel vault ceiling, Gettysburg Address tablet, marble floors, and pillars were restored. The bust of Lincoln still overlooks the foyer.

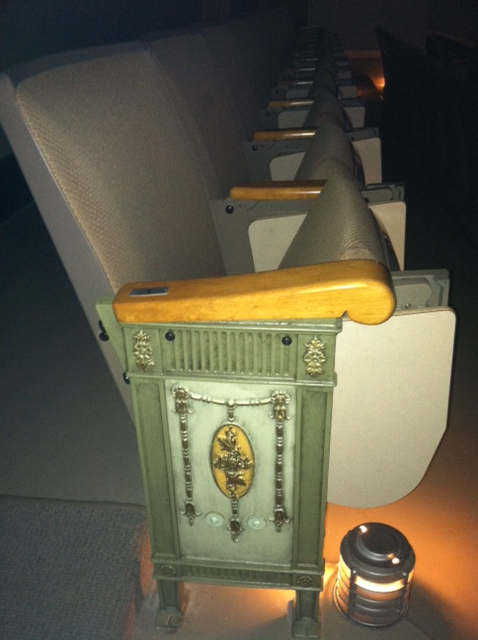
One of the restored decorative iron ends of the seats in Lincoln Hall Theater

Since the renovation of Lincoln Hall, air conditioning and wireless connection are installed throughout the entire building. All 18 classrooms are on the first floor and each classroom has audio/visual capacity. Every classroom is equipped with projectors, display screens, chalkboards, and speakers. Office suites are on the upper floors and include conference rooms equipped for presentations and meetings with faculty.

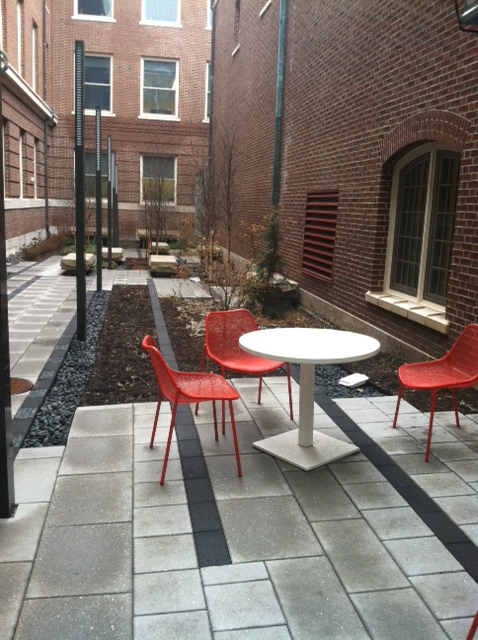
The renovated courtyard

The renovation of Lincoln Hall is also eco-friendly. The roofs within the courtyards are covered with plants reducing rain runoff and increasing the lifespan of the roof. The slate roofing tiles were recycled as mulch for the grounds. Storm drains and sanitary sewers are relined instead of replaced eliminating the need for excavations and new pipe. New building materials—at least 20 percent of which is harvested and manufactured regionally—are recyclable in case the university ever desires another upgrade. Adhesives, sealants, paints, carpeting, and coatings meet low VOC (volatile organic compound) and other chemical component limits set by South Coast Air Quality Management District, Green Seal, and other environmental standards. No composite wood or agrifiber products contain urea-formaldehyde resins. Heating and cooling systems operate on non-hydrochlorofluorocarbon refrigerants to comply with the Montreal Protocol on preserving atmospheric ozone. Finally, low-flow water fixtures are installed to reduce water usage by more than 40%.

The College of Liberal Arts and Science rededicated the renovated Lincoln Hall on February 12, 2013, exactly 100 years to the day of the building's original dedication.

Lincoln Hall also accepts donations towards the Lincoln Hall Fund for Scholarships. People who donate $300 to $1,200 are eligible to have their name engraved in one of the tiles in the courtyard. People who donate $1,500 to $3,000 to the fund get their name engraved in one of the courtyard benches or tables. Lastly, people who donate over $2,500 get a permanently saved seat in Lincoln Hall Theater.
