= College of Liberal Arts and Sciences (University of Illinois Urbana-Champaign) =

College in Illinois, U.S.

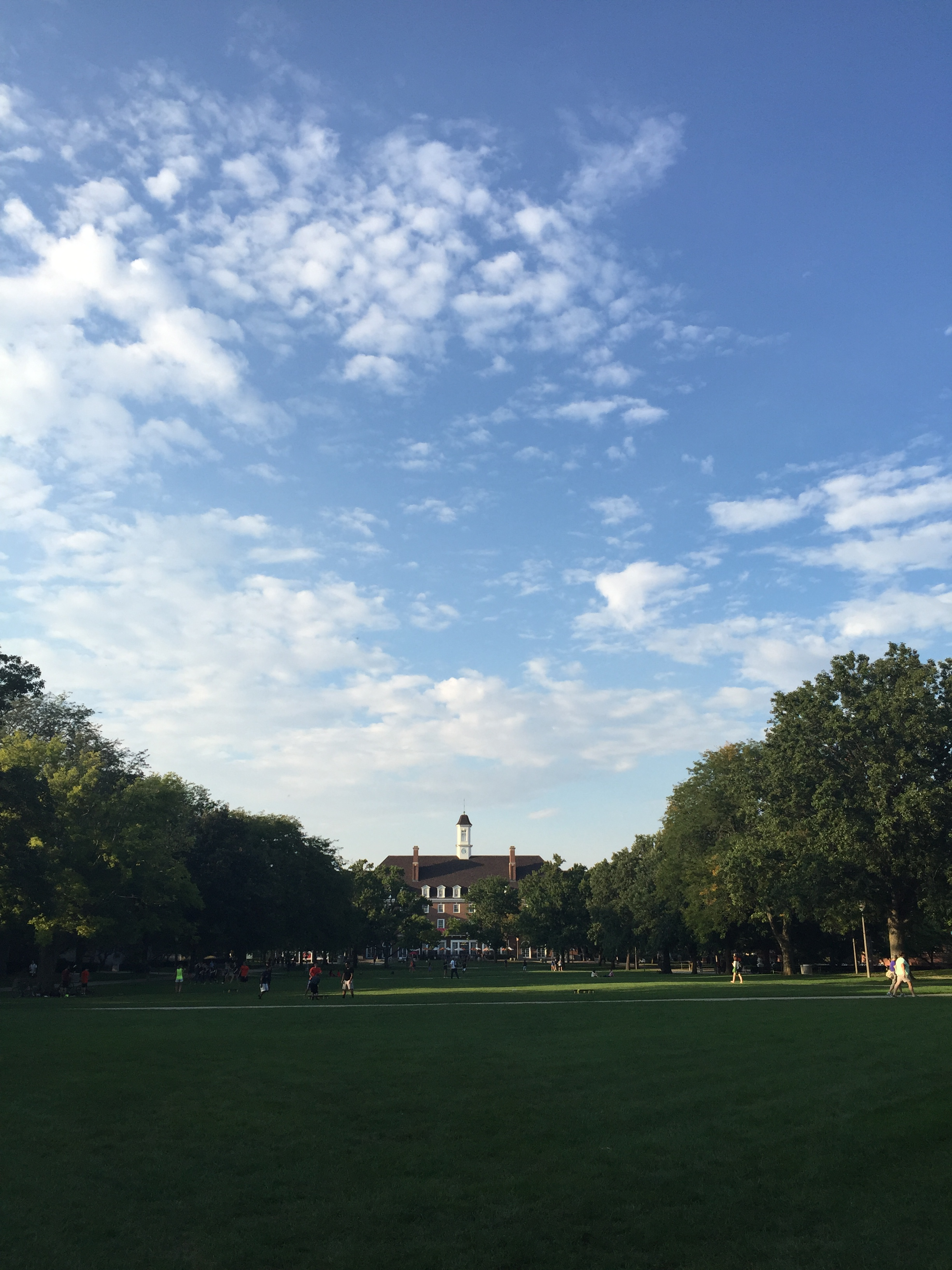
- The Main Quad at the University of Illinois Urbana–Champaign. Many LAS buildings reside on the Main Quad.
- Former names: Illinois Industrial University est. 1868 (158 years ago); College of Literature and Arts est. 1872 (154 years ago); College of Science est. 1894 (132 years ago)
- Type: College of Liberal Arts and Sciences
- Established: 1913 (113 years ago)
- Affiliations: University of Illinois at Urbana–Champaign
- Dean: Venetria K. Patton
- Academic staff: 660
- Students: 15,686
- Undergraduates: 12,979
- Postgraduates: 2,707
- Location: Urbana, Illinois, United States; 40°6′24″N 88°13′42″W
- Website: las.illinois.edu

The College of Liberal Arts and Sciences (LAS) is the largest college at the University of Illinois Urbana-Champaign. Established in 1913 through the merger of the College of Literature and Arts and the College of Science, the college offers 70 undergraduate majors, as well as master's and Ph.D. programs. As of Fall 2025, LAS enrolled approximately 13,000 undergraduate students (34% of the university's total) and 2,700 graduate students.

== Campus ==
LAS contains around 60 buildings, including Altgeld Hall, Noyes Laboratory, the Foreign Languages Building, and the Natural History Building on the Main Quad. Lincoln Hall is the college's headquarters.

The college has led multiple major building renovations in the twenty-first century: Lincoln Hall underwent a $60 million renovation ending in 2012. The building's exterior was restored, the theater was returned to its original look, and in the entrance foyer, some original features were restored, including the barrel vault ceiling, Gettysburg Address tablet, marble floors, and pillars. Classrooms were renovated to include updated audio/visual technology.

The Natural History Building, which is listed on the National Register of Historic Places, underwent a $72 million renovation from 2014 to 2017, adding new classrooms, laboratories, and meeting spaces. The building's exterior includes restored masonry, tile, and marble. In 2019, the building received Leadership in Energy and Environmental Design Gold status for its renovation being conducted in an environmentally efficient manner.

The College of LAS has begun a $192 million project to restore and renovate Altgeld Hall and replace Illini Hall with a new building. This project will provide collaborative spaces for students and faculty and will improve accessibility. The project is targeting LEED Platinum certification for Illini Hall and LEED Silver certification for Altgeld Hall. As of October 2026, both buildings are still under construction.

== Academics ==
The College of LAS contains 37 academic departments, five schools, nine centers and institutes, and at least 70 majors and 60 minors. LAS offers majors and minors in the social sciences, math, humanities, and physical sciences. Among the 30 most popular undergraduate majors at the university, nearly half are in LAS, with psychology, economics, and molecular & cellular biology in the top five. The college offers about 1,500 different classes each semester. More than 99% of all students at the University of Illinois’ Urbana campus take at least one class in the college.

=== Scholarships ===
The College of LAS awards more than $3 million in scholarships every year with 276 scholarships being offered at the college level. Some high level scholarships awarded by the college include Critical Language Scholarships, Fulbright awards, and the Obama-Chesky Scholarship for Public Service. As well as the Marshall, Rhodes, Schwarzman, Truman, and Goldwater scholarships. For international scholars, the college offers the Boren Scholarships and Fellowships for international study.

== Research ==
The College of LAS annually receives approximately $70 million in grant funding for faculty research. All LAS faculty members are affiliated with interdisciplinary research institutes on campus (such as institutes for Advanced Science and technology, Genomics, Humanities, Sustainability, amongst other research areas). Many faculty members are established leaders in them. LAS faculty have been honored with various awards such as the National Medal of Science, Guggenheim Fellowships, National Endowment for the Humanities Fellowships, and memberships to the National Academy of Science and American Academy of Arts and Sciences.

Some research facilities associated with LAS are:

- Beckman Institute for Advanced Science and Technology
  - Dedicated to research in neuroscience, materials science, imagine, language and literacy, and bioengineering.
  - Jeffery Moore, the Murchinson-Mallory Professor of Chemistry, stands as the director.
- Carl R. Woese Institute for Genomic Biology
  - Dedicated to research in biology, cellular and metabolic engineering, and genome technology.
  - Gener Robinson, the Swanlund Chair in Entomology, stands as the director.
- Humanities Research Institute
  - Dedicated to research in the humanities, arts, and social sciences.
  - Antoinetter Burton, the Swanlund Endowed Chair in History, stands as the director.
- Institute for Sustainability, Energy, and Environment
  - Dedicated to research in sustainability, energy, and environmental needs.
  - Evan DeLucia, the G. William Arends Professor of Biology, stands as the director.
- Interdisciplinary Health Sciences Institute
  - Dedicated to faculty-driven research in cancer, precision medicine, and neuroscience.
  - Neal Cohen, a professor of psychology, stands as the director.
- National Center for Supercomputing Applications
  - Dedicated to digitally-enabled research in high-performance computing data-driven science and provides resources for computing, data, networking, and visualization.

== Faculty ==
The College of LAS has approximately 600 tenure-track faculty members, a third of all faculty on the Urbana campus. The college also staffs approximately 250 non-tenure track faculty members who teach and advise students and contribute to research. Nearly one in four LAS faculty members are honored with named appointments.

== Alumni ==
There are more than 183,000 LAS alumni, including 7 Nobel Laureates and 9 Pulitzer Prize winners.

=== Notable alumni ===
- Susan Avery (MS 1974, physics; PhD 1978, atmospheric sciences) - senior fellow at the Consortium for Ocean Leadership.
- David Harold Blackwell (AB 1938; MS 1939; PhD 1941, mathematics) - the first African-American elected to the National Academy of Sciences.
- Maudelle Bousfield (AB 1906, mathematics and astronomy) - the first African-American woman to graduate from the University of Illinois.
- St. Elmo Brady (MS 1914; PhD 1916, chemistry) - the first African-American to earn a doctoral degree in chemistry.
- Nancy Brinker (BA 1968, sociology) - founder of Susan G. Komen for the Cure.
- Lin Chuan (MS 1982; PhD 1984, economics) - former premier of Taiwan.
- Rafael Correa (MS 1999; PhD 2001, economics) - former president of Ecuador.
- Roxanne Decyk (BA 1973, English literature) - Shell executive.
- Edward Adelbert Doisy (BA 1914; MS 1916, chemistry) - Nobel Prize winner in medicine and physiology.
- David Herbert Donald (MA 1942; PhD 1946, history) - Pulitzer Prize in Biography winner.
- Jean Driscoll (BA 1991, speech communication) - Paralympic athlete.
- Bob Dudley (BS 1978, chemical engineering) - former BP executive.
- Robert W. Holley (BA 1942, chemistry) - Nobel Prize winner in medicine and physiology.
- Robert Johnson (BA 1968, teaching of social studies) - co-founder of BET
- Edwin G. Krebs (BA 1940, chemistry) - Nobel Prize winner in medicine and physiology.
- Lynn Morley Martin (BA 1960, teaching of English) - American politician.
- Wendell Stanley (MS 1927; PhD 1929, chemistry) - Nobel Prize winner in chemistry.
