= Lisbon Town Hall =

- U.S. National Register of Historic Places
- Location within New York Location within the United States
- Location: Church and Main Sts. Lisbon, New York, U.S.
- Coordinates: 44°43′44″N 75°19′16″W
- Area: less than one acre
- Built: 1889
- Architectural style: Queen Anne
- NRHP reference No.: 80004336
- Added to NRHP: September 4, 1980

Lisbon Town Hall is a historic town hall building located in the Town of Lisbon in St. Lawrence County, New York. It was built in 1889 and is a large frame barn like structure with Queen Anne style decoration. It is a 2 1/2-story building with an exposed basement of local stone and a gambrel roof.

It was listed on the National Register of Historic Places in 1980.
