= Gayoso Hotel =

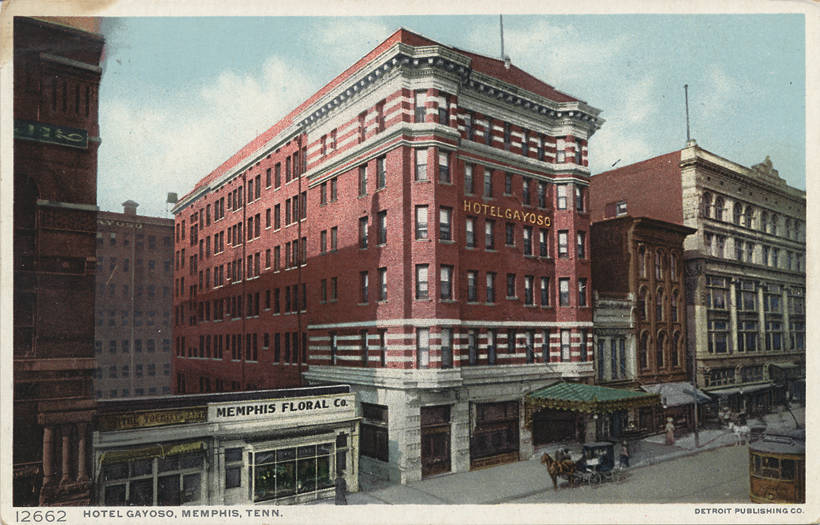

Gayoso Hotel, originally the Gayoso House, is a former hotel in Memphis, Tennessee. Built in 1842 it overlooked the Mississippi River. It burned July 4, 1899 and was rebuilt according to a design by James B. Cook. Goldsmith's Department Store acquired it in 1948 and expanded into it from next door. It was eventually renovated for use as an apartment and office building with a restaurant.

It had murals painted in 1903 by Newton Alonzo Wells depicting Hernando De Soto's voyage that are now at the DeSoto County Courthouse. The Gayoso House at Peabody Place is an apartment complex.

== See also ==
- History of Memphis, Tennessee
- National Register of Historic Places listings in Shelby County, Tennessee
