= Illini Union =

Coordinates: 40°06′34″N 88°13′38″W

Illini Union University of Illinois at Urbana–Champaign
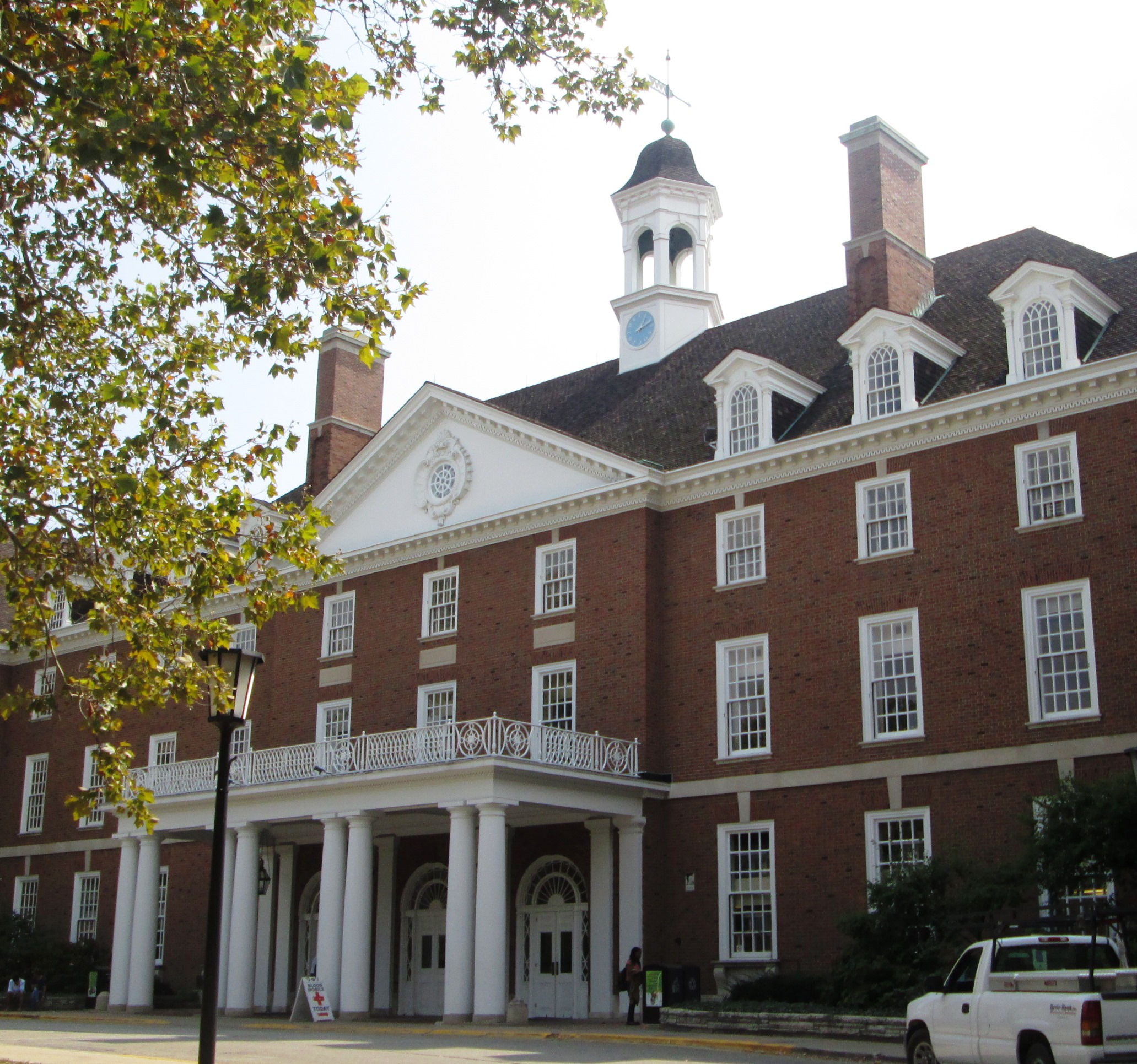
- (2013)

General information
- Type: Student union
- Architectural style: Colonial Revival
- Completed: 1941

Website
- https://www.union.illinois.edu/

The Illini Union, located at 1401 West Green Street in Urbana, Illinois, on the campus of the University of Illinois at Urbana–Champaign, is the student union for the university.

The building was dedicated on November 1, 1941, as the campus's home for student organizations, meetings, and student programs and activities, replacing University Hall. It was constructed in cooperation with the University of Illinois Foundation, which secured funding for the construction through a $525,820 Public Works Administration grant and a $656,000 loan which was later repaid through student fees.

Today, Illini Union contains the Illini Union Hotel, a credit union, a convenience store, information services, CITES (Campus IT) instructional facility, quick-service restaurants, a bowling alley, arcade, student performance spaces, and office space for Registered Student Organizations, student government, Student Legal Services, Student Tenant Union, LGBT Resource Center, and Union administration.

The Illini Union Board serves as a campus-wide programming organization and as the advisory Board for the Illini Union Director.
