= Harker Hall =

- Chemical Laboratory
- U.S. National Register of Historic Places
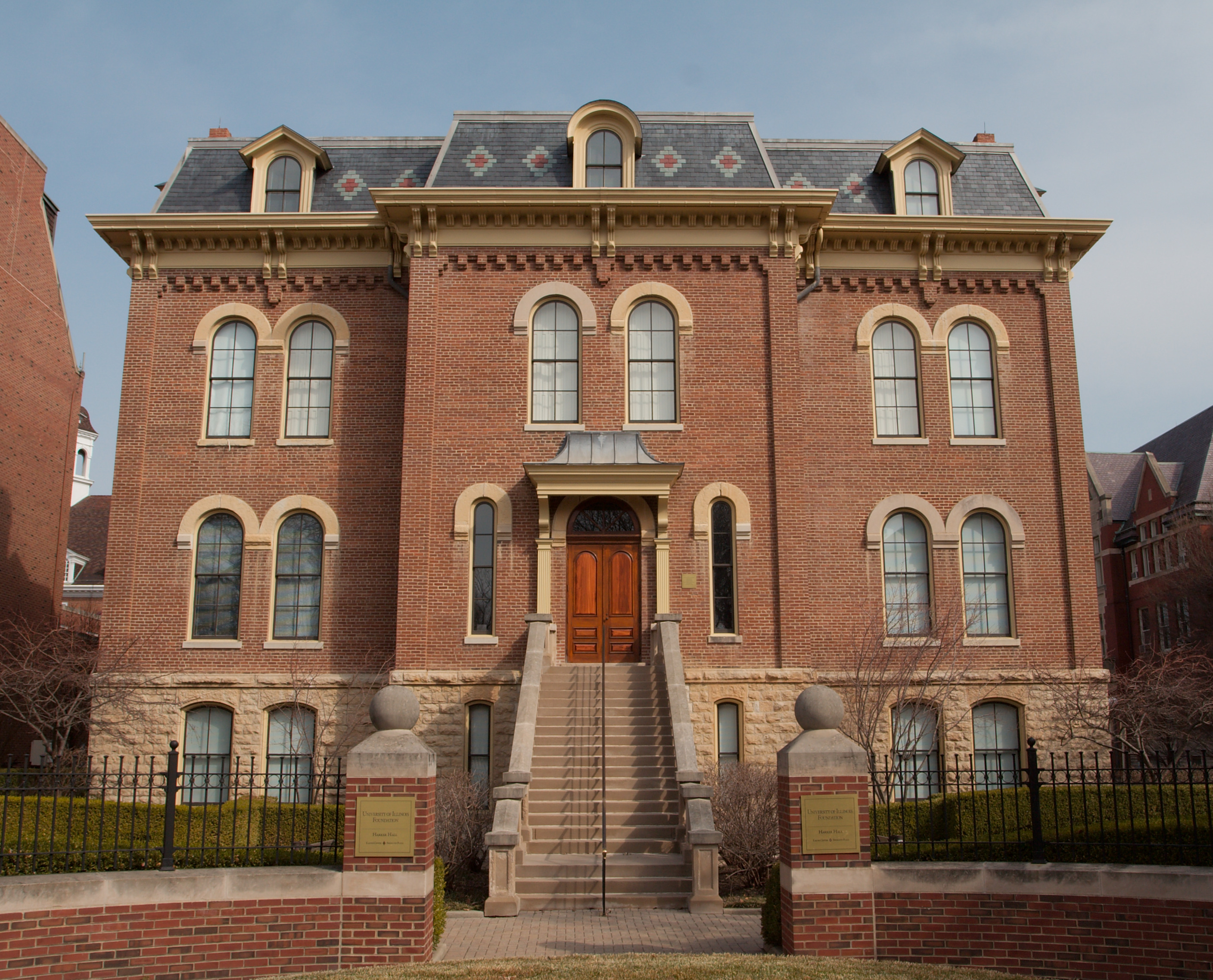

- Location within Illinois Location within the United States
- Location: 1305 W. Green St., Urbana, Illinois
- Coordinates: 40°6′32″N 88°13′36″W
- Area: less than one acre
- Built: 1877
- Architect: Ricker, Nathan Clifford
- Architectural style: Second Empire
- MPS: University of Illinois Buildings by Nathan Clifford Ricker TR
- NRHP reference No.: 86003148
- Added to NRHP: November 19, 1986

Harker Hall, also known as the Chemical Laboratory, is a historic building on the campus of the University of Illinois at Urbana–Champaign in Urbana, Illinois. Built in 1877, the building originally served as the university's chemical laboratory. Architect Nathan Clifford Ricker and John Mills Van Osdell designed the Second Empire building, which originally featured a mansard roof. In 1896, a lightning strike set the roof on fire, and architect James White replaced it with a hip roof. The building was named Harker Hall in honor of Oliver A. Harker, who served as dean of the university's law school from 1903 to 1916. Until it stopped hosting classes, the hall was the oldest classroom building at the university.

The building was added to the National Register of Historic Places on November 19, 1986.

== Timeline ==
References
