= School of Information Sciences (University of Illinois Urbana-Champaign) =

Library and information science school, University of Illinois

Coordinates: 40°06′28″N 88°13′53″W

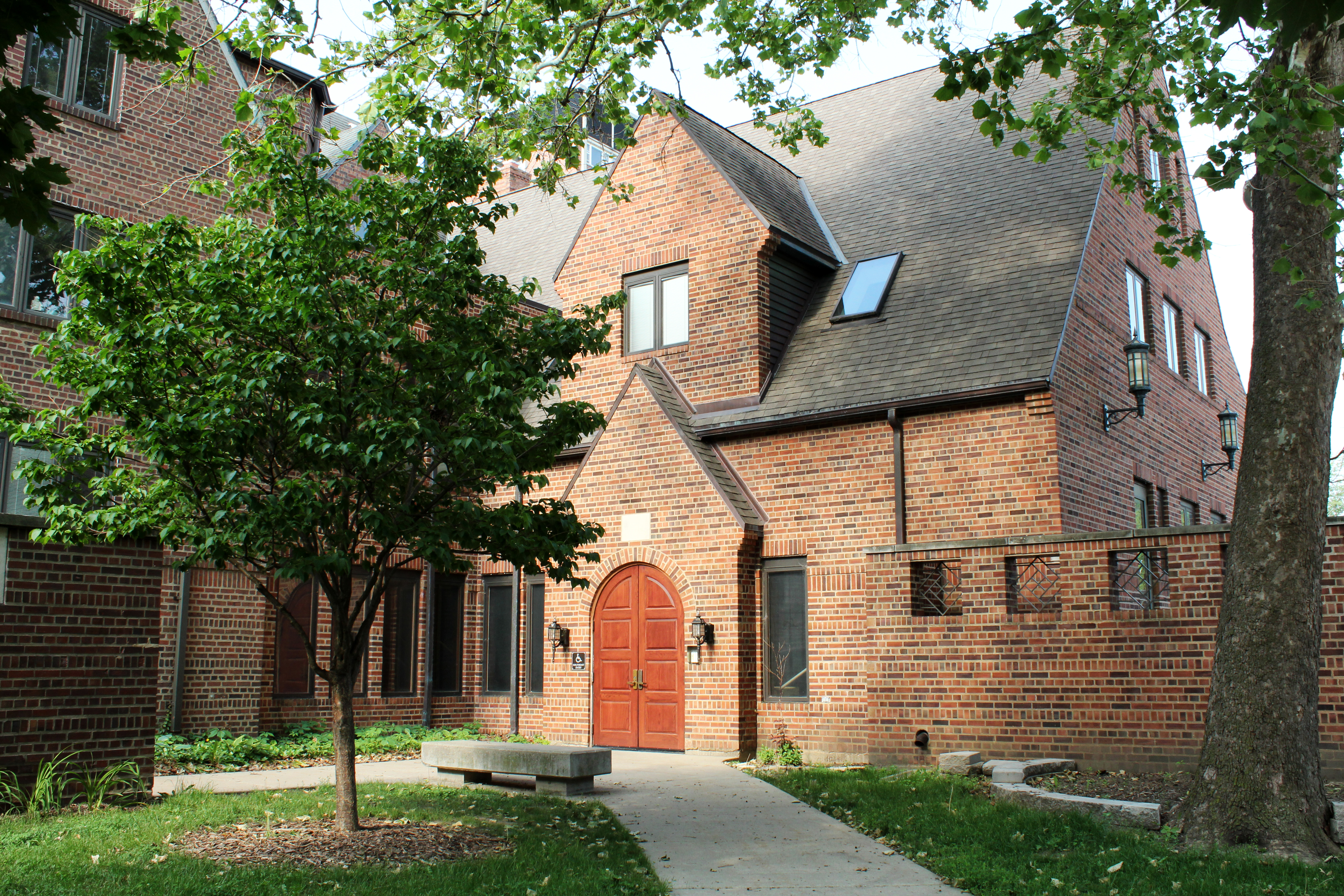
- Established: 1893, as the Library Science Program at the Armour Institute in Chicago
- Parent institution: University of Illinois Urbana-Champaign
- Academic staff: 67 FTE
- Students: 2,030 students
- Location: 501 E. Daniel Street, MC-493 Champaign, IL 61820-6211, Champaign, Illinois, United States
- Website: ischool.illinois.edu

The School of Information Sciences is an undergraduate and graduate school at the University of Illinois Urbana-Champaign. Its Master of Science in Library and Information Science is currently accredited by the American Library Association. The school is a charter member of the iSchool initiative.

== History ==
The program has its roots in the Library Science Program at the Armour Institute of Chicago created in September 1893 as part of the strong cultural movement following the Industrial Revolution to professionally educate men and women for the upcoming twentieth century and for the technical world. The public library had come to be seen by most as a "university of the people," and those who were to become the "best librarians" were those formally educated in the trade.

Seeking a director, Frank W. Gunsaulus, the president of the Institute, asked Melvil Dewey to recommend the best person for the job. Dewey recommended Katharine Sharp, who was finishing up her library science degree program in Dewey's school in Albany, NY. Once established, the school became the only library science program in the Midwest and the fourth in the United States.

Sharp, in turn, became the library school: "Her enthusiasm, her drive, and her unswerving dedication were the determining factors for the school during its formative years in Chicago as well as the following ten years when she directed the Illinois State Library School on the Urbana–Champaign campus." The school in Chicago, operating off of a technical institute model, began taking on a university structure under Sharp's leadership. The Armour facility did not provide enough collection or classroom space that was needed, and finances were becoming tight. The University of Illinois and the University of Wisconsin were interested in the program, and both universities offered to accept Sharp's program. Sharp chose the University of Illinois, and the program moved to Urbana.

The initial location for the library science program was in Altgeld Hall where it remained until 1926. It then moved to the Main Library for the next fifty three years until 1979. The program then relocated to David Kinley Hall until 1993. An additional relocation went underway when the University purchased property from Acacia fraternity's Illinois Heth chapter and moved the school to its current location at Fifth and Daniel Streets. As of August 2021, the School leased an additional two floors in The Hub high rise at 614 E. Daniel Street.

The school officially changed its name from the Graduate School of Library and Information Science (GSLIS) to the School of Information Sciences in June 2016.

== Facilities ==
The school is located on the corner of Fifth and Daniel Streets in Champaign, Illinois. It is situated next to the Department of Speech and Hearing Science and across the street from the Department of Psychology. The building was formerly the location of the Acacia and still has functional showers for both men and women along with three kitchens. Other areas, such as the second floor lounge and the doctoral student area, serve as study spots for students. Wireless Internet access is also available in all public areas, and technology support is provided by the department's Help Desk on the second floor. The Help Desk is staffed by current iSchool master's students. In 2021, the school expanded into new spaces on the fourth and fifth floors of the Hub Champaign Daniel building located on the corner of Sixth and Daniel Streets in Champaign.

The school is in close proximity to many campus libraries. The University of Illinois Urbana–Champaign, one of three campuses of the University of Illinois system, has over 40 libraries; their combined holdings are among the largest in the United States and the world. One such library, The Center for Children's Books, which houses more than 16,000 youth trade books, is located in the iSchool building.

== Curriculum ==
=== Undergraduate Programs ===
Bachelor of Science in Information Sciences (BSIS) prepares students to use information and data to understand human perspectives, social context, and policy implications. Students focus on designing information systems and services; organizing and evaluating information for diverse users; and interpreting data for use in real-world situations.

Bachelor of Science in Information Sciences + Data Science (BSIS+DS) is an interdisciplinary curriculum that combines information sciences, statistics, computer science, and math. The program prepares students to collect, organize, analyze, and store data in ways that help organizations manage processes and make decisions. The BSIS+DS is part of a campus-wide partnership to provide interdisciplinary education in data science. The core program consists of a collaboration between the iSchool, Grainger College of Engineering, and College of Liberal Arts and Sciences.

=== Undergraduate Minors ===
Minor in Informatics focuses on the design, application, use, and impact of information technology, allowing students to become better creators and users of computing technology and to think critically about technology’s role in society.

Game Studies and Design Minor fosters critical skills in academic game studies and technical skills in game design. Students learn to think critically about the history, cultural meaning, social impact, ethics, and increasingly significant role of games, gaming, and interactive media in a diverse society.

=== Graduate Programs ===
Master of Science in Library and Information Science (MSLIS) prepares students to connect foundational concepts, theories, and principles of information organization and access within professional contexts. Students will design systems and services to provide access to information, analyze information challenges, and develop the capacity to apply ethical principles in everyday practice. The MSLIS program at Illinois is consistently ranked #1 by U.S. News & World Report.

Master of Science in Information Management (MSIM) provides students with training in management and policy; knowledge representation; human-centered design and systems; and data analytics. Graduates will acquire technical and problem-solving skills, along with the leadership necessary to ethically apply those methods to the complex problems faced by organizations and society.

Master of Science in Bioinformatics Information Sciences (IS) Concentration prepares students in managing information produced in a range of biomedical settings and in creating healthcare systems that connect the available data and analytics to improve medicine and public health.

=== Joint Degrees ===
MSLIS students can earn joint degrees as follows: MSLIS + MA in History; MSLIS + MA in Russian, East European, and Eurasian Studies; MSLIS + MA in African Studies; JD + MSLIS.

=== Doctoral Program ===
Doctorate in Information Sciences expands upon a master’s degree in information science. Students will complete 32 credit hours, a presentation to demonstrate research competency, the field exam, and a dissertation as well as attend talks, meet with international visitors, and participate in School-sponsored events.

=== Certifications, Licensures, and Endorsements ===
Certificate of Advanced Study is a customized approach to expanding a student’s professional career. Students select an area of focus and then design and complete a project that furthers that study.

School Librarian Licensure allows MSLIS and CAS students to prepare for careers as instructional partners, teachers, school leaders, information specialists, and program administrators. Students also can pursue a School Librarian Endorsement, Technology Specialist Endorsement, and a Certificate in Teaching Media Literacy.
