= School of Social Work (University of Illinois Urbana-Champaign) =

College in Illinois, U.S.

Coordinates: 40°6′23.3″N 88°13′16.1″W

University of Illinois School of Social Work
- Type: Public
- Established: 1944
- Parent institution: University of Illinois Urbana-Champaign
- Dean: Ben Lough
- Students: 546
- Undergraduates: 260
- Postgraduates: 286
- Location: Urbana, Illinois
- Website: socialwork.illinois.edu

The School of Social Work is the social work school of University of Illinois Urbana-Champaign. The school was originally a graduate school, but began an undergraduate program in Fall 2010.

On May 11, 2023, Ben Lough was named as the new dean of the school. He succeeded Steve Anderson. Anderson had served since 2017.

== Facilities ==
The School of Social Work houses one building, located on Nevada Street in Urbana. Until 2009, the building used to be housed on Oregon Street. The current location is three blocks east of the Main Quadrangle, and a block east of Busey–Evans Residence Halls.

== Ranking ==
As of 2025, the master's program has been ranked 24th out of 319 social work schools by U.S. News & World Report.

== See also ==
- List of social work schools
