= Nathan Clifford Ricker =

American architect

- Born: June 24, 1843; Acton, Maine
- Died: March 19, 1924 (aged 80)
- Occupation: Architect
- Spouse: Mary Carter Steele
- Children: Ethel

Nathan Clifford Ricker, D.Arch (June 24, 1843 – March 19, 1924) was a professor and architect known for his work at the University of Illinois. He was born on a farm near Acton, Maine June 24, 1843. In 1875, he was married to Mary Carter Steele of Galesburg, Illinois. Mary Steele graduated with honors from the University of Illinois in 1875. His only child, Ethel, was born in 1883. He died on March 19, 1924.

== Educator ==
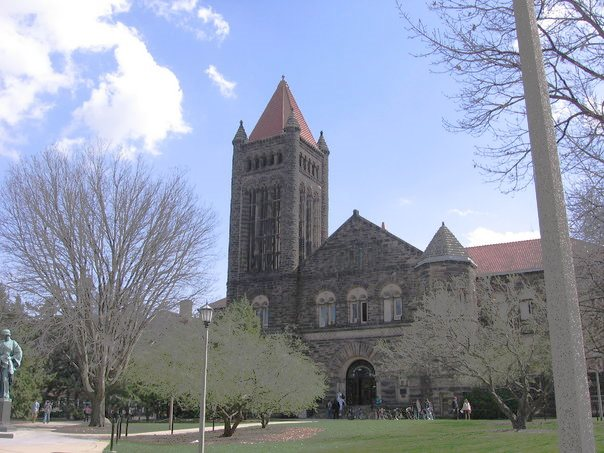
Altgeld Hall

He served the University of Illinois for 45 years, from 1872 - 1917. He chaired the Department of Architecture from 1873 - 1910, creating the department and its curriculum. In 1890, he established the first curriculum in architectural engineering. From 1878 - 1905, he served as dean of the College of Engineering. He also served as university architect, designing four major buildings at UIUC. The publication of his book, Elementary Graphical Statics and Construction of Trussed Roofs LCCN 06-46611 in 1885 was the first book published by a University of Illinois faculty member.

== Architect ==
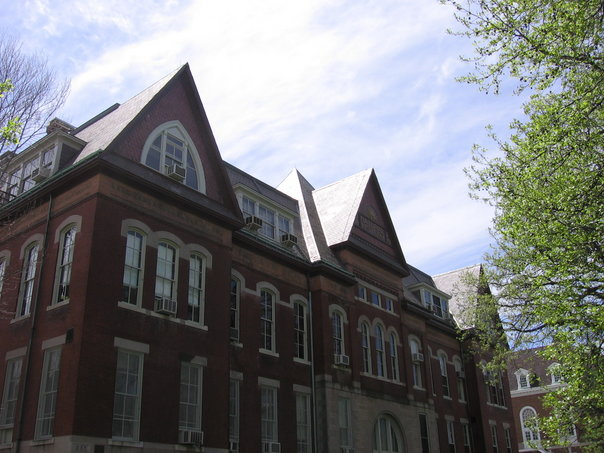
Natural History Building

On March 12, 1873, he received his graduation certificate, making him the first person to receive a Degree in Architecture in the United States. In 1914, Alpha Rho Chi honored him with the title of "Master Architect." He is associated with the design of several sites listed on the National Historical Register and located in Champaign County, Illinois.

- Altgeld Hall (originally Library Hall)
- Harker Hall (originally Chemical Laboratory)
- Metal Shop, now known as Aeronautical Lab "B"
- Kenney Gym, listed as Military Drill Hall and Men's Gymnasium
- Natural History Building
- 612 West Green Street, Urbana, Illinois. The home he designed and occupied from 1892 until his death in 1924.
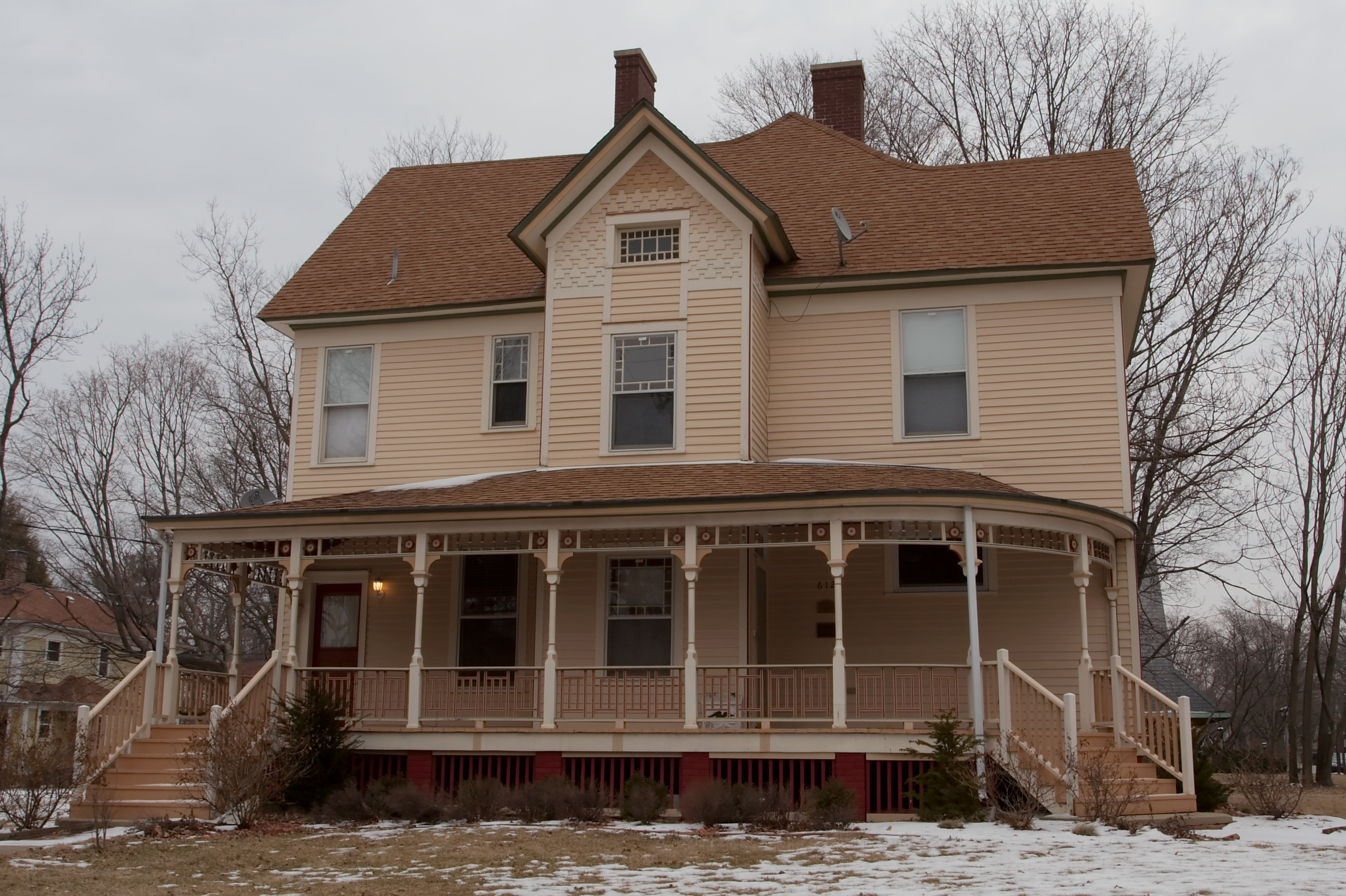
  Nathan Ricker House, Urbana

== Books written by Ricker ==
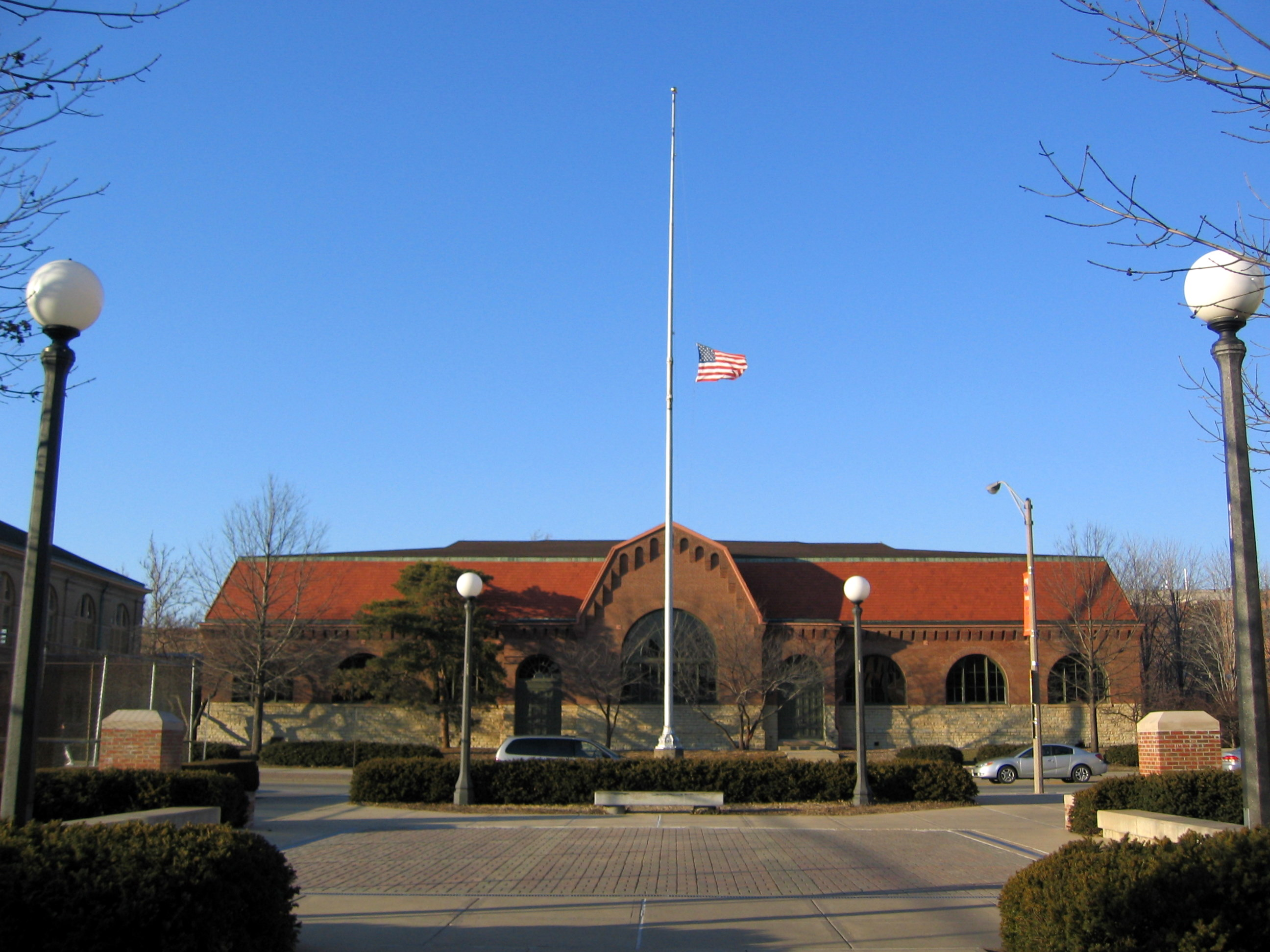
Kenney Gym

- The elements of construction in architecture (1881) LCCN ca09-5085
- Elementary Graphical Statics and Construction of Trussed Roofs (1885) LCCN 06-46611
- Technical review of the Chicago public library (1898) LCCN 01-8168
- An extension of the Dewey decimal system of classification applied to architecture and building. (1906) LCCN 07-29856
- A study of roof trusses (1907) LCCN 08-7167
- A treatise on design and construction of roofs (1912) LCCN 12-22158
- Simplified formulas and tables for floors, joists and beams; roofs, rafters and purlins (1913) LCCN 13-15719
- A study of base and bearing plates for columns and beams (1919) LCCN 10-7724
