= Altgeld Hall =

Educational building in University of Illinois Urbana-Champaign

Coordinates: 40°6′34″N 88°13′42″W

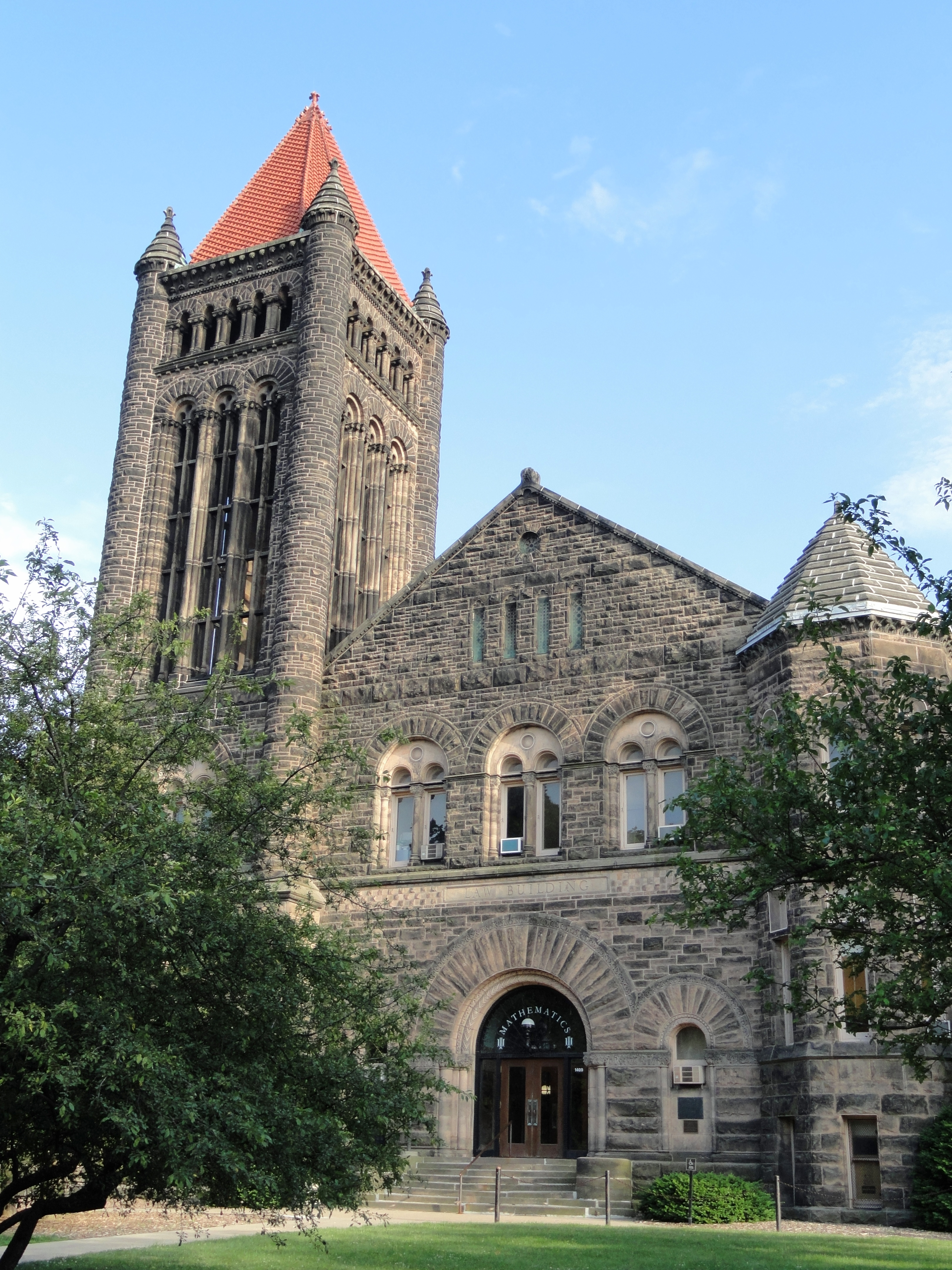
- Altgeld Hall in 2011
- Interactive map of the Altgeld Hall area
- Former names: University Library; Law Building

General information
- Type: educational
- Architectural style: Richardsonian Romanesque
- Location: University of Illinois Urbana-Champaign, 1409 West Green Street; Urbana, Illinois
- Current tenants: Department of Mathematics; Mathematics Library
- Construction started: June 10, 1896
- Completed: December 1, 1897
- Owner: University of Illinois Urbana-Champaign

Design and construction
- Architects: Nathan Ricker and James M. White

Altgeld Hall, located at 1409 West Green Street in Urbana, Illinois on the University of Illinois Urbana-Champaign (UIUC) campus, was built in 1896–97 and was designed by Nathan Ricker and James M. White of the university's architecture department in the Richardsonian Romanesque style. Planning for the building began during the Illinois governorship of John Peter Altgeld. The building was originally the University Library, and received major additions in 1914, 1919, 1926, and 1956. From 1927 to 1955 it was used by the College of Law, and from 1955 on by the Department of Mathematics and the Mathematics Library. The University Chime in the bell tower – which marks the hours, half hours, and quarter hours and plays a ten-minute concert every school day from 12:50–1:00 p.m. – was installed in 1920. The building was officially named "Altgeld Hall" in 1941. Altgeld Hall was added to the National Register of Historic Places on April 17, 1970.

== History ==
=== Design ===
Planning for the building started in 1892, with Governor John Peter Altgeld and University President Andrew Sloan Draper involved in the design of the building. Initially, the trustees announced a design contest that would award $1200 to the best design. The trustees awarded the prize to Edward G. Bolles, a young man with no experience in building design, but after the building committee met with the young man, they decided to reject the Bolles entry and all the other entries submitted.

Based on a suggestion made by Governor Altgeld, the building committee offered the commission to Daniel Burnham, fresh from his success as the organizing architect of the 1893 World's Columbian Exposition in Chicago. Artistic conflicts between Burnham and the Governor soon became clear, and the relationship was severed. After two years of looking for an acceptable design, the building committee called upon the university's own architecture department. On February 4, 1896, Professors Nathan Ricker and James McLaren White completed the design plans that included construction costs in less than a month.

Altgeld Hall was one of five Illinois university buildings, the so-called "Altgeld's castles", in whose designs the governor took a personal interest.

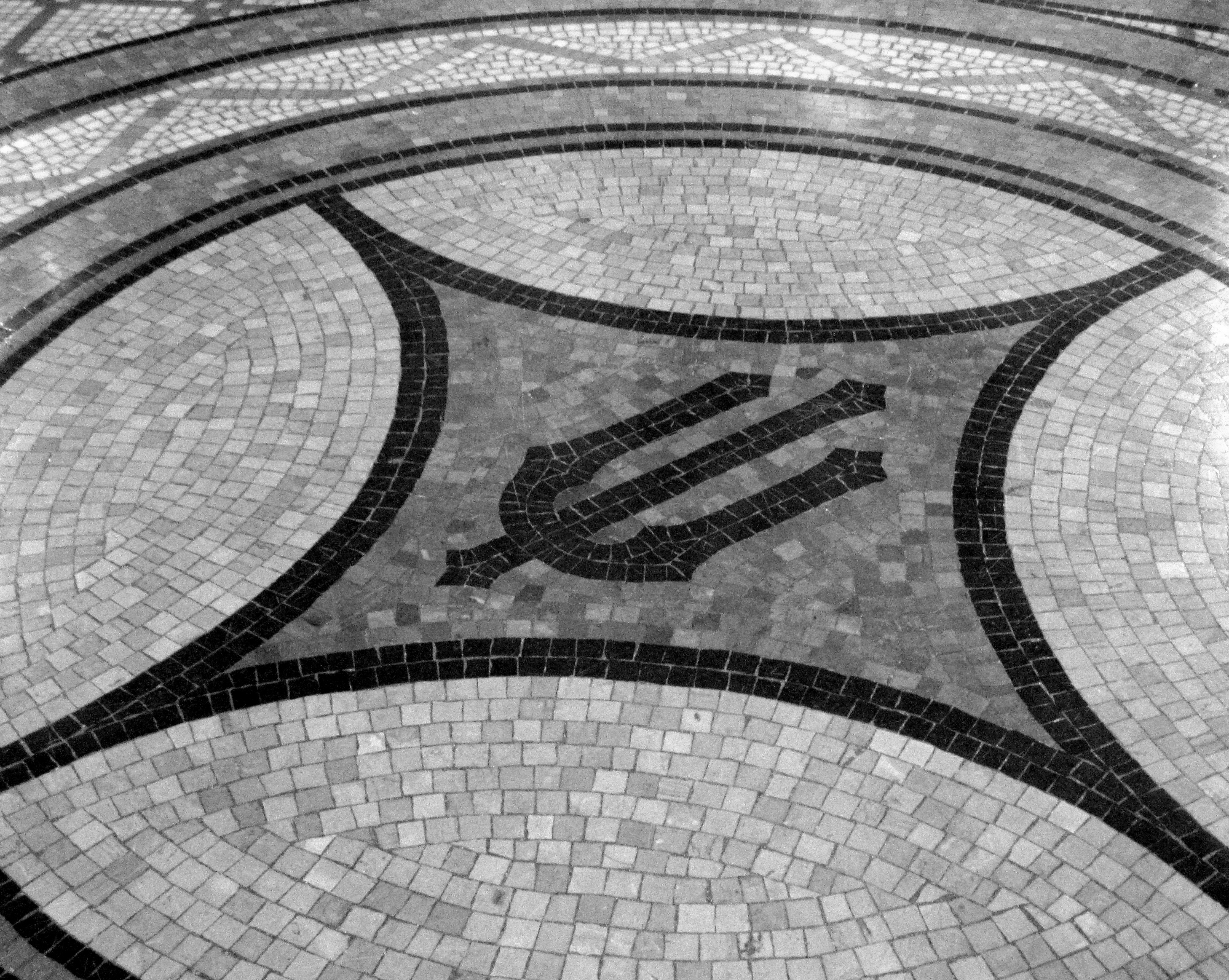
Mosaic floor in the entry way

=== Construction ===
Construction started on June 10, 1896, only four months after the initial building design was submitted by Ricker and White. The cornerstone, which included a time capsule, was set on September 11, 1896. Ricker and White supervised the construction of the building which was completed on December 1, 1897.

=== Decoration ===
The exterior features the only gargoyle on campus, while the interior features four murals painted around the domed ceiling of what is now the Mathematics Library. Newton Alonzo Wells painted the murals at the recommendation of the architects. The four murals were dedicated to the four colleges at the university in 1897. The south mural is "The Sacred Wood of the Muses" dedicated to the College of Literature and Arts. The north mural is "Arcadia" dedicated to the College of Agriculture. The west mural is "The Laboratory of Minerva" dedicated to the College of Science. The east mural is "The Forge of Vulcan" dedicated to the College of Engineering.

=== Use ===
At dedication on June 8, 1897, the building was designed as the University Library. In 1927, the School of Law moved in and occupied the building until 1955; an inscription at the north entrance of the building still says Law Building. Since 1955 the Department of Mathematics and the Mathematics Library have occupied the building . In 1941, the building was officially named Altgeld Hall after Governor Altgeld. The building made a brief appearance in the 1945 film The House on 92nd Street, posing as Ohio State University.

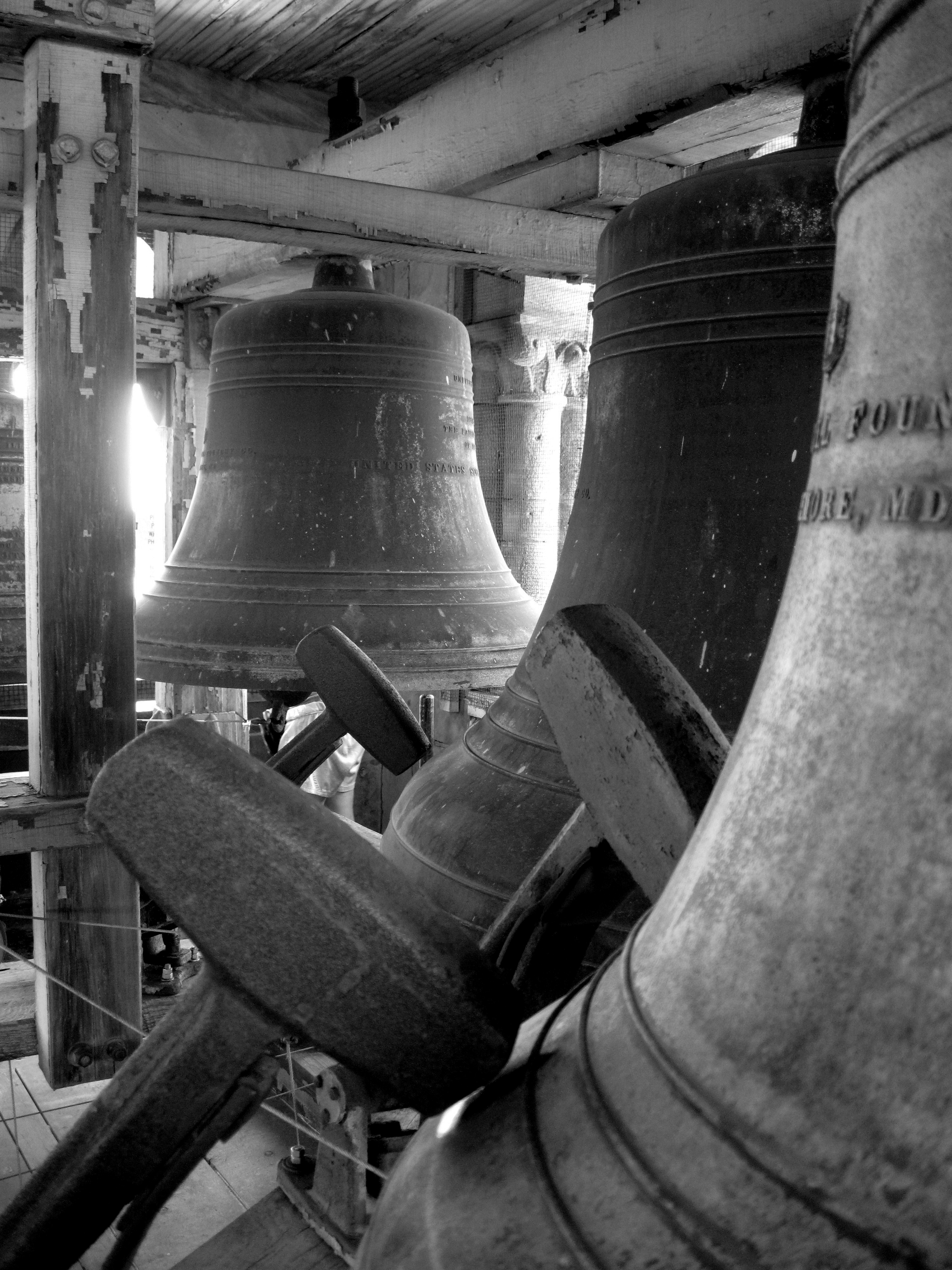
Bells in Altgeld Hall Tower

== The Altgeld Chimes ==
The Altgeld Chimes were installed and dedicated on October 30, 1920. Atop the 132-foot tower are fifteen bells, weighing a total of seven and a half tons, cast by McShane Bell Foundry. The university's chime was a gift from the graduating classes of 1914–1921 and the United States School of Military Aeronautics. The senior class of 1922 purchased a Seth Thomas clock mechanism that allows the chime to play the Westminster chime to mark the hours and the quarters. The mechanism does not currently operate.

A small playing chamber is inside the tower containing a wooden chimestand with fifteen pump handles that control the clappers inside the bells via steel wires. Each lever is marked with a musical note, which form an almost complete chromatic scale, ranging from low D to high G while missing low D-sharp and both F-naturals. This configuration of bells were cast such that it can play the university fight song “Illinois Loyalty” in the key of D-major. For this reason, songs must often be transposed to keys where F-naturals are not present.

Official concerts are performed every weekday classes are in session from 12:50 to 1:00 PM. Concerts are performed during special occasions, such as Homecoming Weekend, the University of Illinois Founders Day, and Commencement evening. In addition, informal concerts are held randomly throughout the day during the last ten minutes of the hour. It is tradition to play the university's alma mater, "Hail to the Orange," during every concert. The concerts have been a tradition since 1920 when the university chime was installed.

== Folklore ==
Throughout the history of Altgeld Hall, students have circulated various urban legends about the building's contents, due in part to its labyrinthine floor plan. In the 1950s, a fake office for the pseudonymous mathematical collective Nicolas Bourbaki was constructed in a third-floor room near the building's elevator shaft, complete with a quill pen, candle, and sign labeled "N. Bourbaki". Despite being removed by the university due to fire safety concerns, the office remained an urban legend over the next several decades, with students and professors replacing its sign and sharing rumors in what was "perhaps the longest-lasting prank in the building’s history."

Beginning in the 2010s, students have circulated widespread rumors and falsified photographs on social media, particularly Reddit, about the existence of a Dairy Queen ice cream shop inside the building. This has led some students, especially freshmen, on a wild goose chase to find the nonexistent ice cream shop.

== See also ==
- Altgeld's castles
