= Campus of the University of Illinois Urbana-Champaign =

College campus in Illinois, United States

Coordinates: 40.1019523°N 88.2271615°W

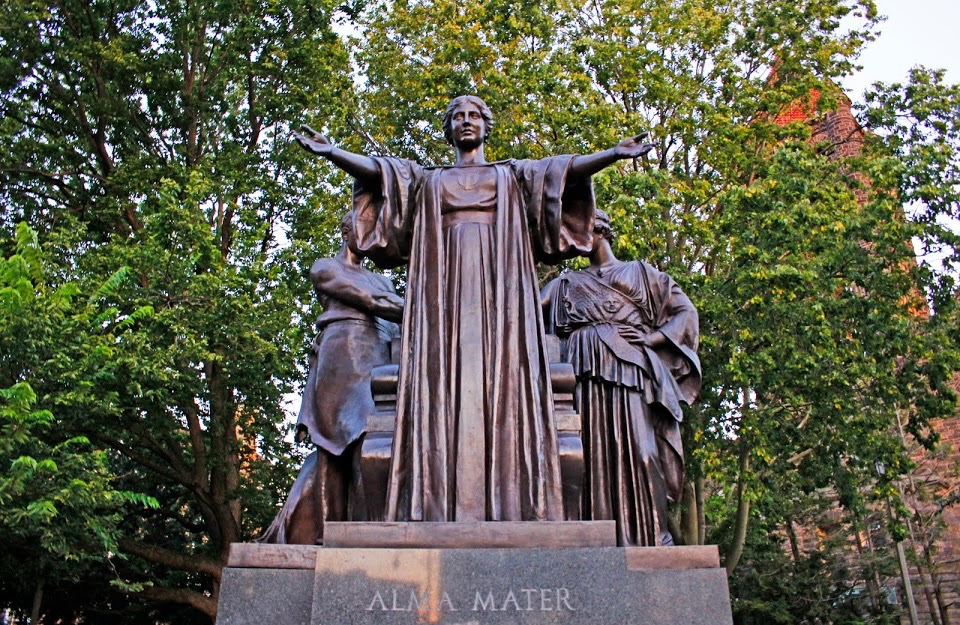
Alma Mater was dedicated on June 11, 1929.

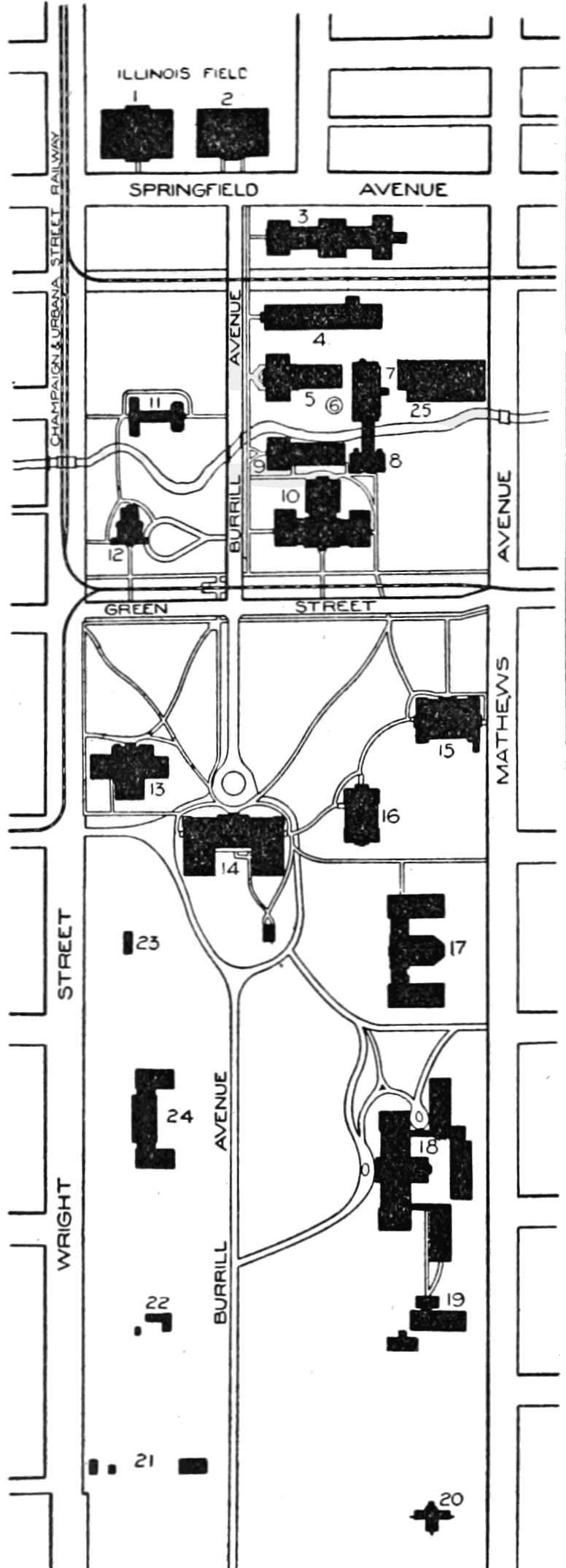
Campus depicted in 1905

The University of Illinois Urbana-Champaign is an academic research institution that is the flagship campus of the University of Illinois System. Since its founding in 1867, it has resided and expanded between the twin cities of Champaign and Urbana in the State of Illinois. Some portions are in Urbana Township.

Several architects had been instrumental in the building of the campus. These include Ernest L. Stouffer, Nathan Clifford Ricker, Charles A. Platt, James M. White, Clarence Howard Blackall, Holabird & Roche, and W.C. Zimmerman. Various campus buildings have been placed on the National Register of Historic Places; these include the Mumford House, Louise Freer Hall, Evans Hall, Busey Hall, Main Library, Altgeld Hall, Round Barns, Kenney Gymnasium, Natural History Building, and Harker Hall. In addition, the Morrow Plots and the University of Illinois Observatory are designated as the National Historic Landmark. In celebration of the 2018 Illinois Bicentennial, the Main Quadrangle at the University of Illinois Urbana-Champaign was selected as one of the Illinois 200 Great Places by the American Institute of Architects Illinois component (AIA Illinois).

== History ==
Established as one of 37 public land-grant institutions established after the Morrill Land-Grant Colleges Act. The act was signed by Abraham Lincoln on July 2, 1862. The Morrill Act of 1862 granted each state in the United States a portion of land on which to establish a major public state university, one which could teach agriculture, mechanic arts, and military training, "without excluding other scientific and classical studies." This phrase would engender controversy over the university's initial academic philosophies, polarizing the relationship between the people of Illinois and the university's first president, John Milton Gregory. Illinois was one of seven commonwealths that had not formed a state university. The grant established eligibility for 480,000 acres of public scrip land valued at $600,000.

In the 1920s, the university became known as one of the strongest fraternity campuses in the country. Fraternity row was established in the early 1900s while sorority housing concentrated on John Street. The fraternity district moved southward towards Chalmers Street and most sororities moved to Urbana by the Greek house building boom in the 1920s. In June 1929, the Alma Mater statue was unveiled. Like many universities, the economic depression slowed construction and expansion which was during President Arthur C. Willard's term. Willard served from 1934 to 1946. Even though expansion was slow but added Gregory Hall and the Illini Union. In the years following World War II, under president David Henry the university experienced rapid growth. The enrollment doubled and the academic standing improved which also resulted in the expansion of the campus and buildings. This included the creation of Willard Airport.

== Main Quad ==
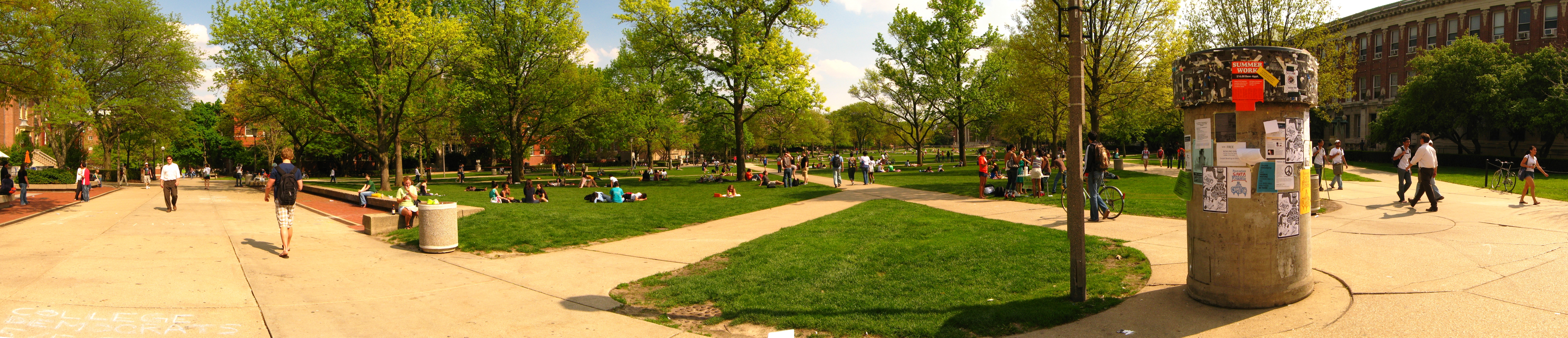
A panorama facing southeast on UIUC's Main Quad in 2009

There are fifteen buildings on or very close to the Main Quad that comprise the main campus of the university. They are listed clockwise with the Illini Union on the north side as the top:

=== Illini Union ===
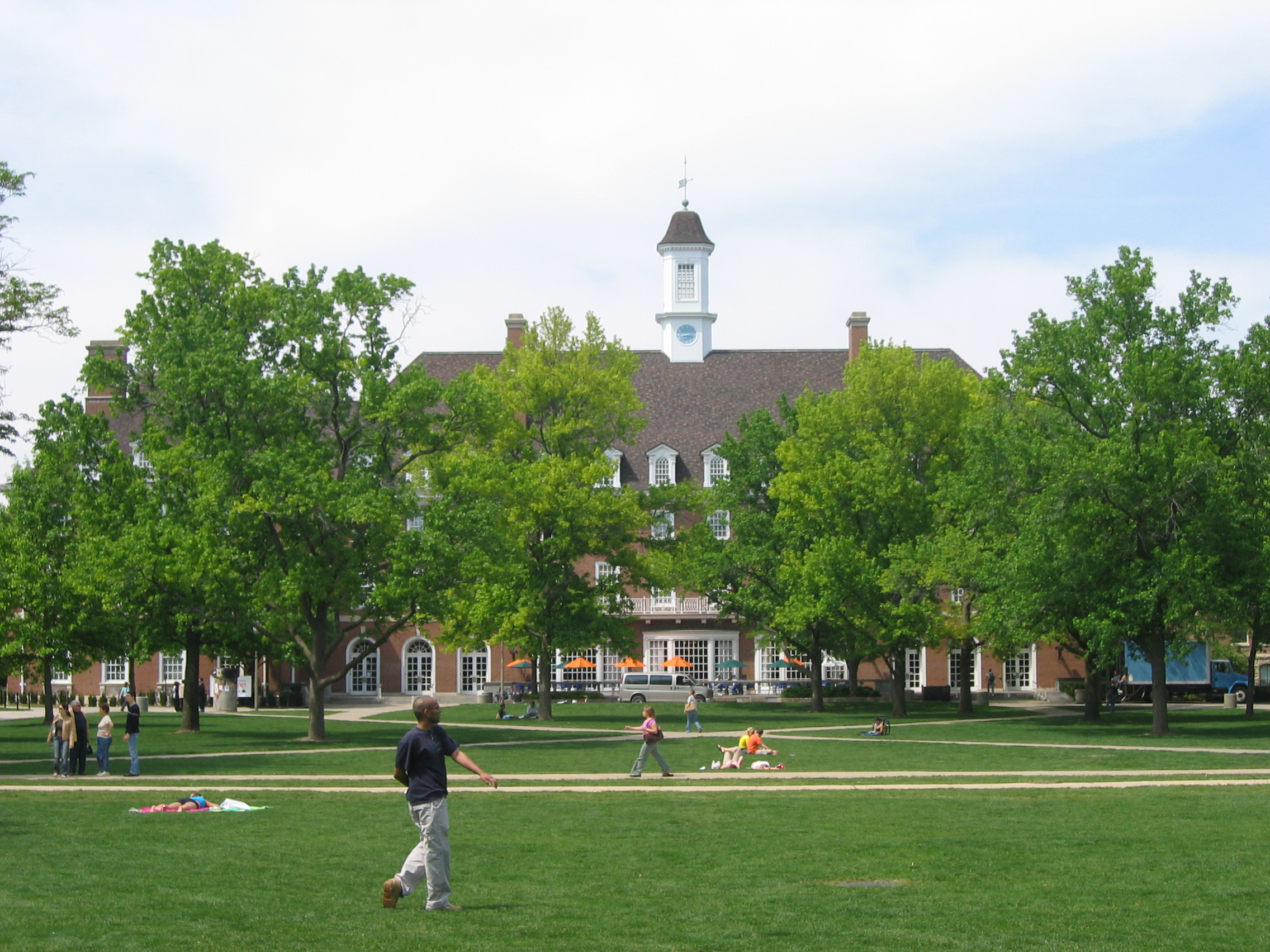
Illini Union

The Illini Union is the student union at the northernmost point of the Main Quad and lies on Green Street. Its Georgian Revival style was conceived by Ernest L. Stouffer, university architect, and Howard Cheney, consulting architect. The cupola, clock, and bell from University Hall (demolished) are retained in the Union. Much of the original woodwork was carved by John C. Freiburg. The building was constructed in 1939–40; a $6.9 million addition in 1960 dramatically increased its size and usefulness. The Union replaced the University Hall, one of the first buildings on the campus. It is the center of student activities and hundreds of registered student organizations. Numerous expos, conferences, and events are held in the Union's ballrooms and facilities. There is a full-service underground food court and bowling alley as well as a university operated hotel in the upper floors.

=== Harker Hall ===
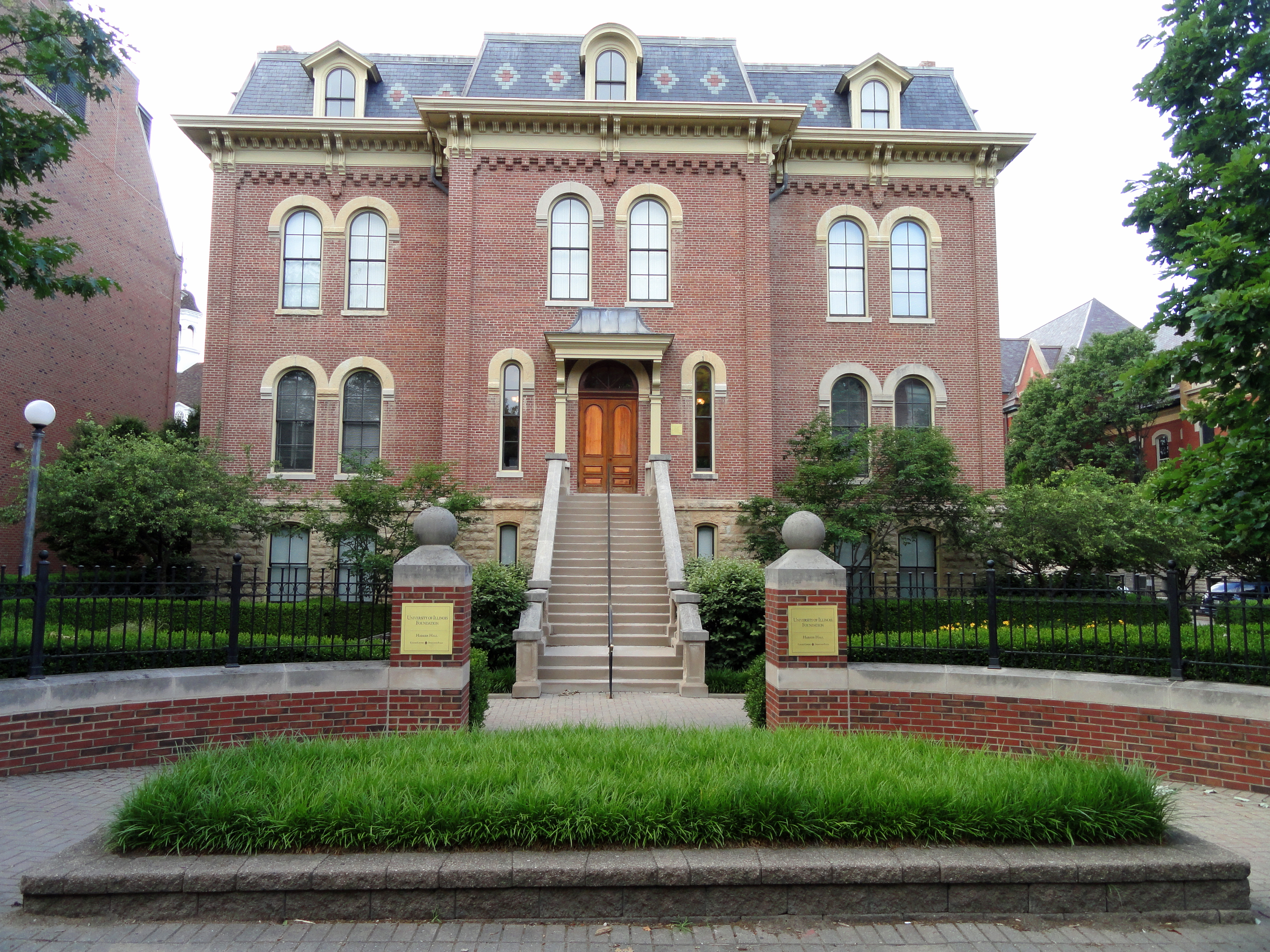
Harker Hall

Harker Hall is immediately east of the Union and west of the Natural History Building. The building previously housed the Department of Chemistry and School of Law. The building was named after Judge Oliver Harker, who served as the Dean of the College of Law from 1903 to 1916. Harker Hall underwent extensive restoration in 1992 and is home to the University of Illinois Foundation, a non-profit organization that is responsible for the fund raising effort for the University of Illinois system.

=== Natural History Building ===
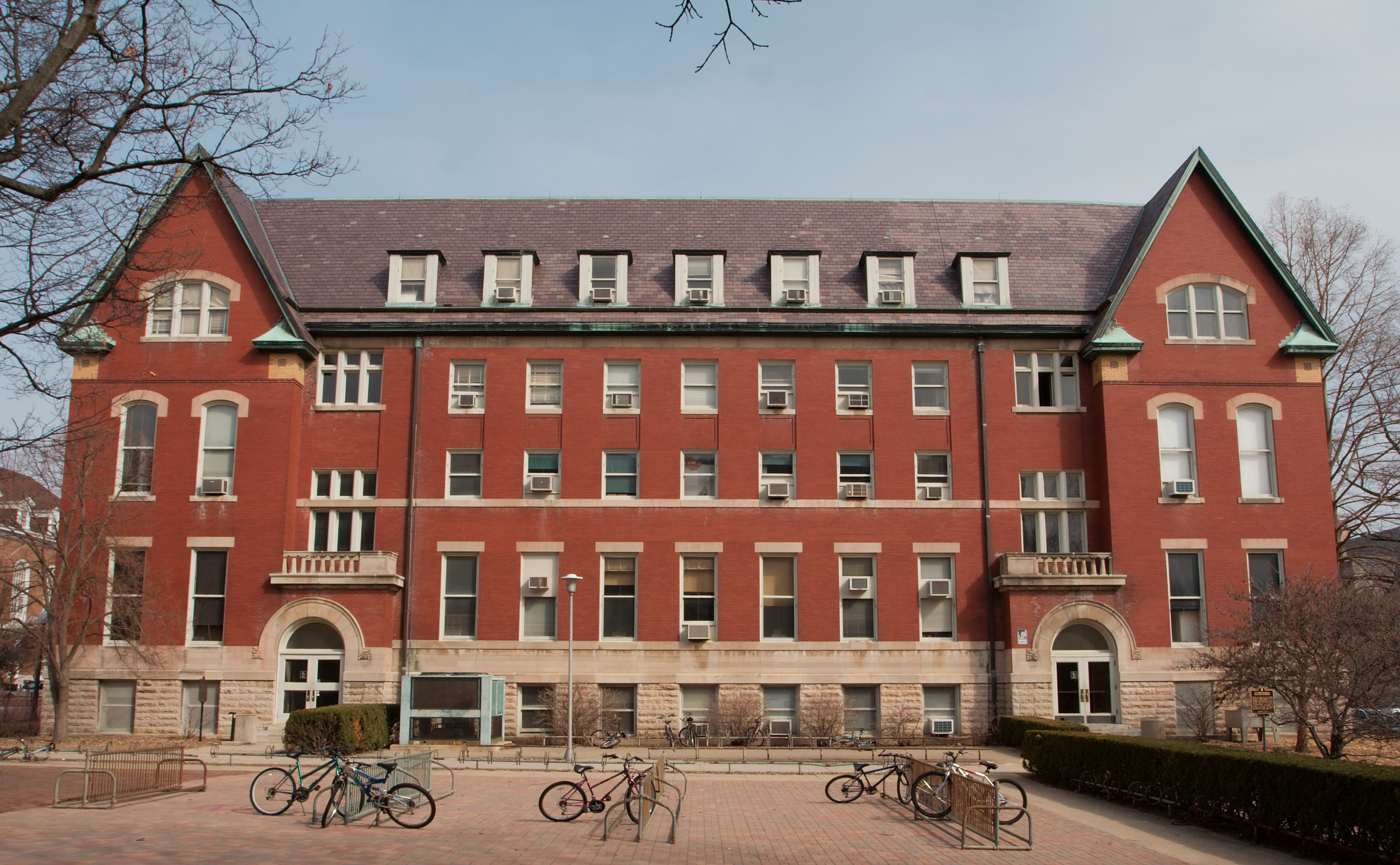
The Natural History Building

The Natural History Building marks the northeast corner of the LAS buildings and has been largely evacuated as a result of structural issues discovered in 2010. The building was designed by Nathan Clifford Ricker and was placed on the National Register of Historic Places, and has several additions that expanded the building to the south in the early 20th century. The building used to house the university's natural history museum with exhibits on geology and paleontology. The majority of these exhibits have been relocated to storage facilities or became part of the Spurlock Museum. The building was set to undergo a $70 million renovation beginning in 2014, and upon completion in 2016, will house the School of Earth, Society and Environment (which includes the departments of Atmospheric Sciences, Geology, and Geography and Geographic Information Science) and teaching labs of the School of Integrative Biology.

=== Noyes Laboratory ===
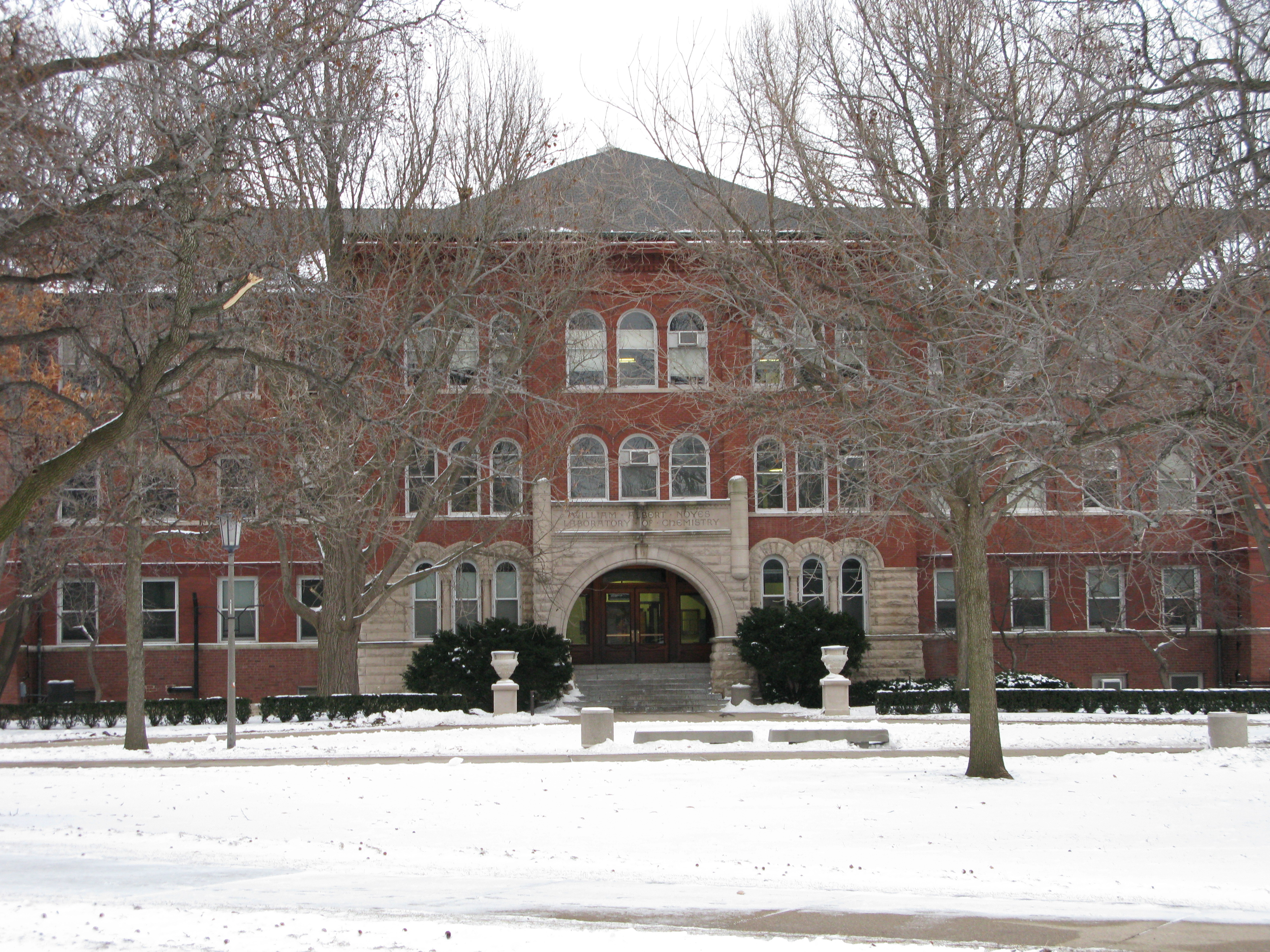
Noyes Laboratory

Noyes Laboratory is home to the chemistry department and lies directly south of the Natural History Building. The building is in the Richardsonian Romanesque style. Built in 1902, the Noyes Laboratory was the largest chemistry building in the nation upon its completion. The building was designated a National Historic Chemical Landmark by the American Chemical Society in 2002.

=== Chemistry Annex ===
The Chemistry Annex provides additional facilities for the chemistry department; among them labs, classrooms, study halls and the Chemistry Learning Center, where students can receive additional assistance from TAs and professors. While Chemistry Annex is physically attached to the north side of Davenport Hall it is connected to Noyes Lab via a tunnel.

=== Davenport Hall ===
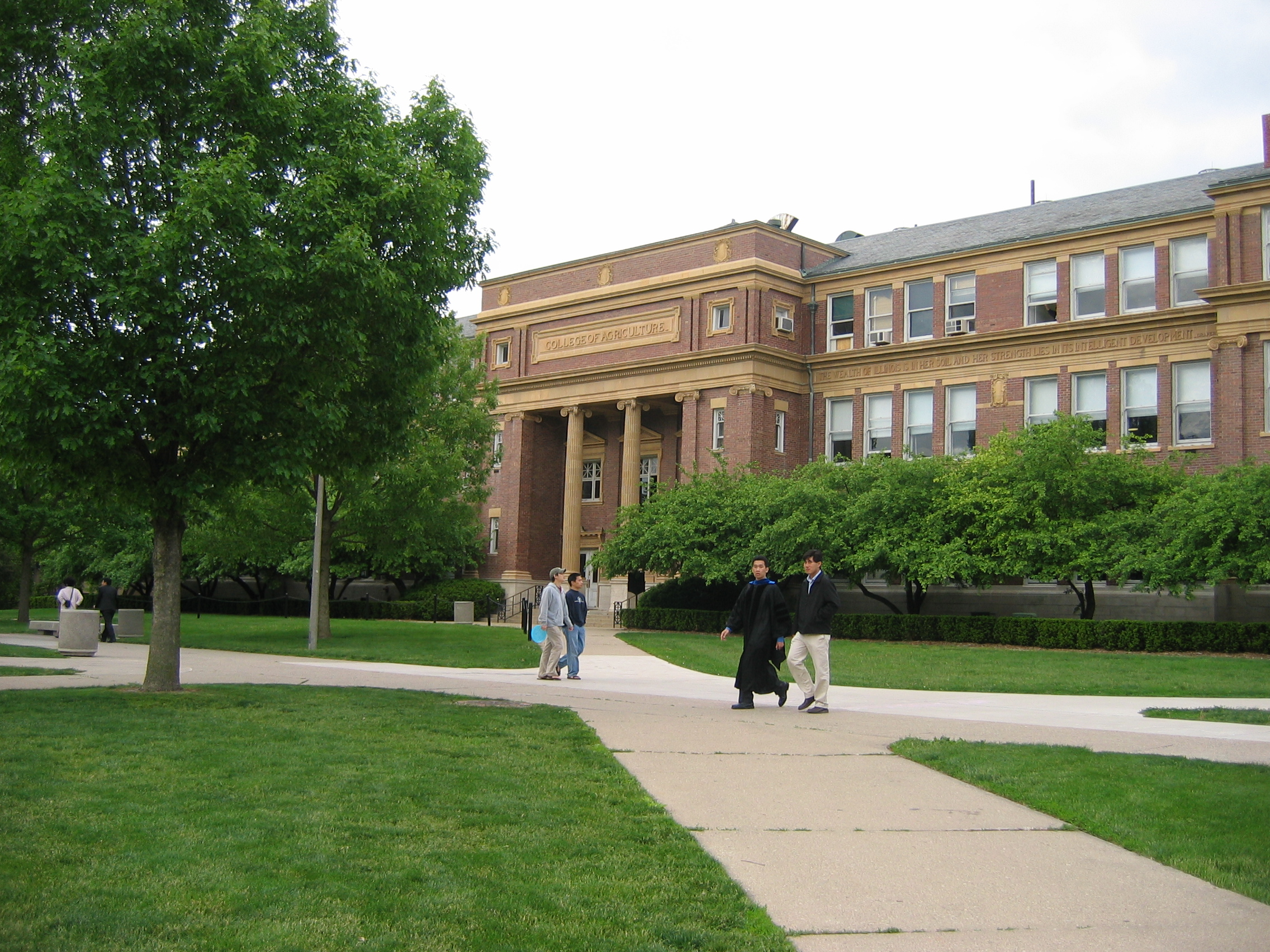
Davenport Hall

Completed in 1899, the Davenport Hall is one of the oldest academic buildings on campus. Davenport Hall is immediately south of Noyes Lab and the Chemistry Annex. It is still labeled with its original name, "College of Agriculture," but today is home to the departments of geography and anthropology. The building was named after Eugene Davenport, the former dean of the College of Agriculture.

=== Literatures, Cultures & Linguistics Building ===
The Literatures, Cultures & Linguistics Building (formerly known as the "Foreign Languages Building") is south of Davenport Hall and is home to internationally recognized research and teaching that focuses on the analysis of culture, broadly understood.

A popular myth is that the building's distinctive architecture was a result of its being designed to house a supercomputer on campus called PLATO. The building was supposedly designed so that if it was bombed, the building's shell would fall outwards, protecting the supercomputer on the inside. It is also rumored that the building's interior layout was a result of trying to confuse Soviet spies and prevent them from stealing secrets from the supercomputer. In reality, the building's architecture is not actually all that unique and was a popular style of the day. In fact, just a few blocks to the west, one may find the Speech and Hearing Sciences Building, which is a two-story clone of the building. PLATO itself was real, but referred not to a secret government program, but rather to the first "modern" electronic learning system, the predecessor of course software like WebCT and Mallard. The mainframe computer that ran the PLATO system was located in north campus, in a building which used to reside on the west side of the Bardeen Quad.

=== Foellinger Auditorium ===
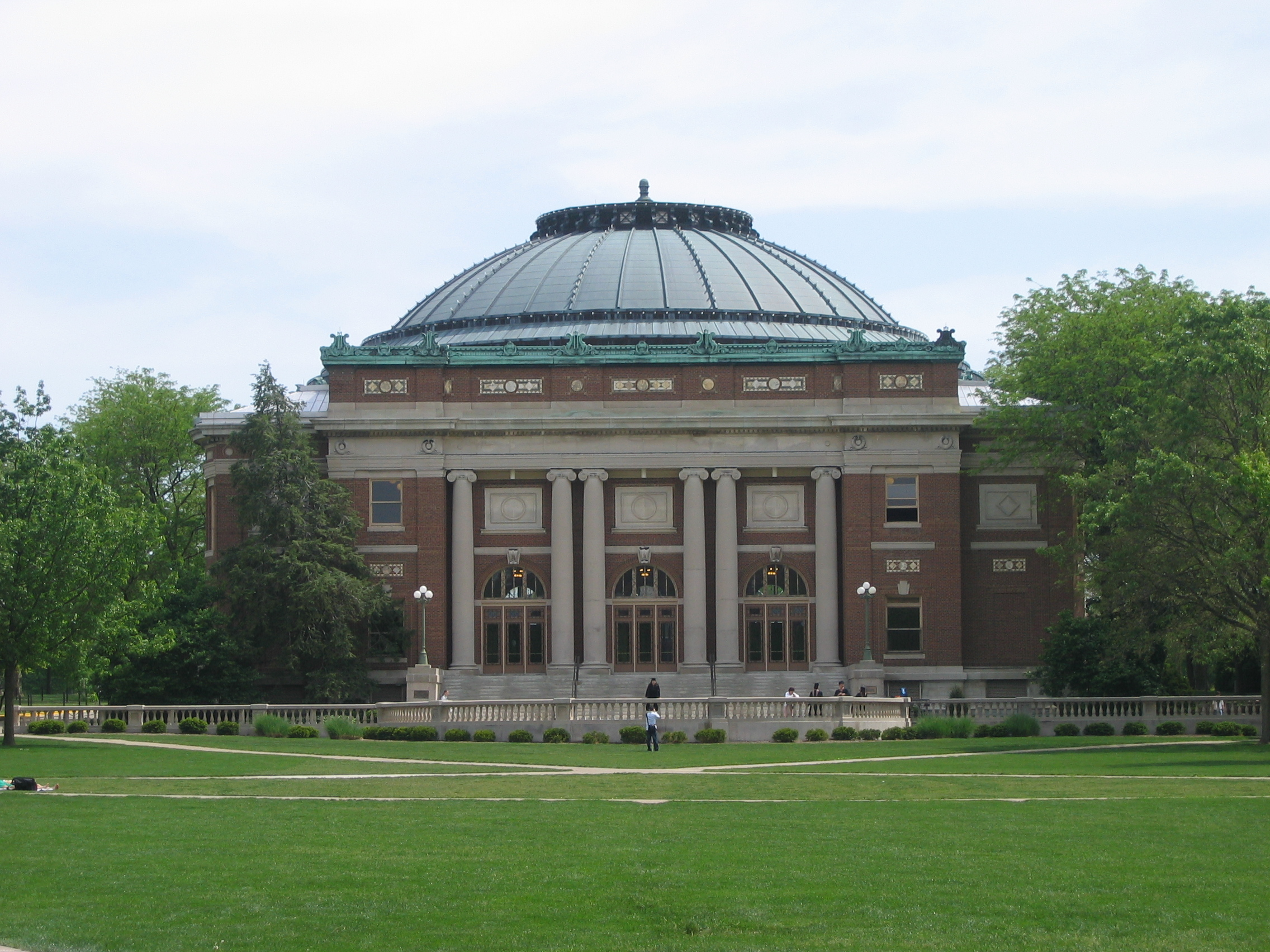
Foellinger Auditorium

Foellinger Auditorium marks the southern terminus of the Main Quad, directly facing the Illini Union. Originally known as the "University Auditorium," the structure was renovated as part of a donation from Helene Foellinger of Fort Wayne, Indiana. The structure was designed by Charles Blackall, a prominent Boston-based architect who specialized in theater design. It is used for stage productions, speaker presentations, and large lecture classes.

=== Gregory Hall ===
Gregory Hall lies due west of Foellinger and houses numerous departments within the College of Media and LAS, including philosophy, economics, and history. The building is named in honor of John Milton Gregory, the former University President.

=== Lincoln Hall ===
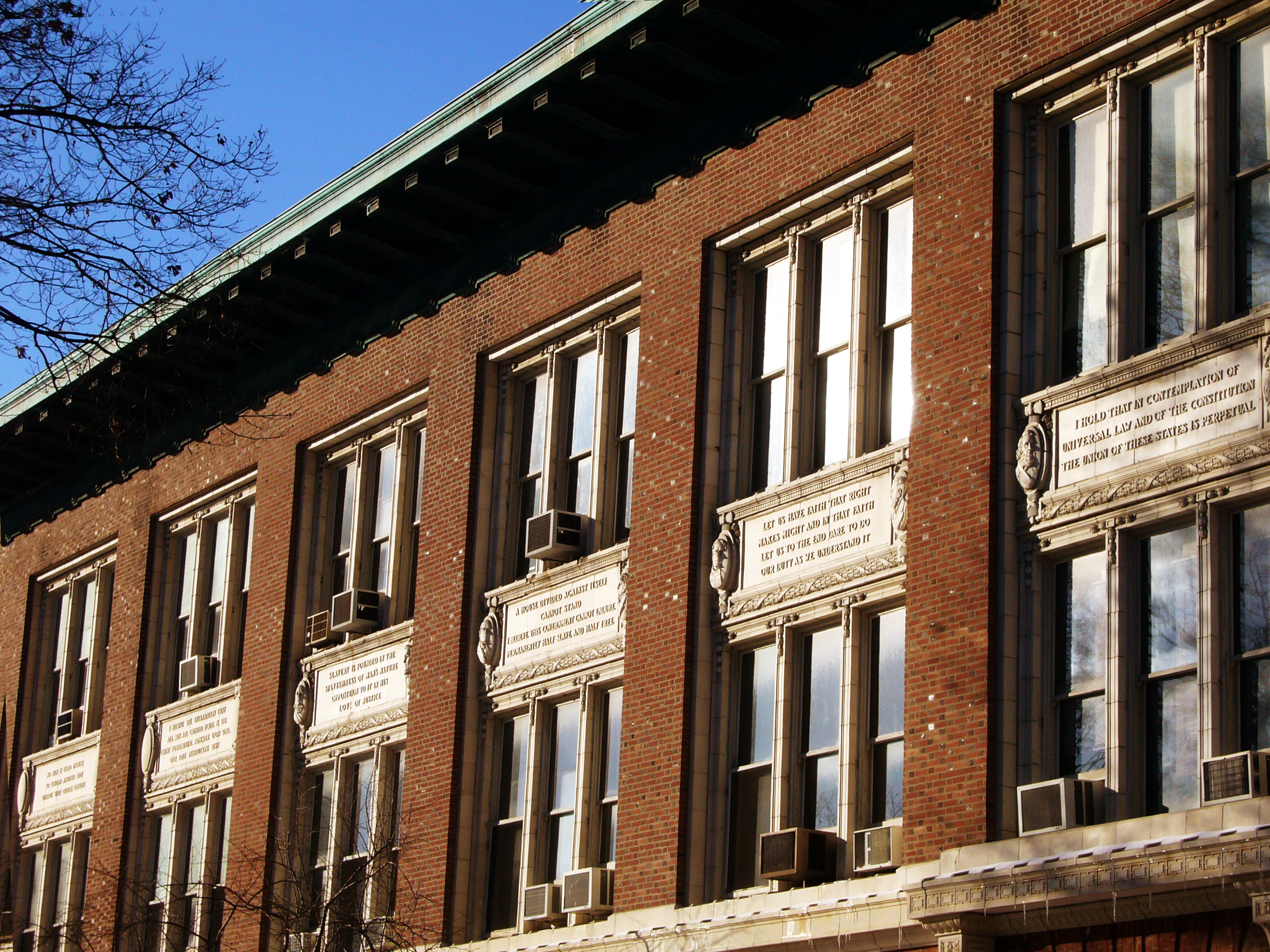
Lincoln Hall's narrative terra cotta panel

Lincoln Hall is northwest of Foellinger and is home to the College of Liberal Arts & Science, the largest college on campus. The building centers around a large auditorium. A big bust of Abraham Lincoln outside the entrance to the theater has its nose polished and nearly worn away after decades of students' rubbing it for good luck prior to a test. Prior to the opening of the Spurlock Museum across the campus, Lincoln was the home of the World Heritage Museum. In Spring 2007, Illinois Governor Rod Blagojevich's proposed capital budget for the Fiscal Year 2008 called for $55.1 million for the $66.4 million renovation project. The building reopened for classes in Spring 2012.

=== Eternal Flame ===
The free standing pillar between Lincoln Hall and the English Building on the Main Quad is the Eternal Flame. Formerly an ever-burning oil lamp, it is now topped with an electric light. It is a memorial from the class of 1912.

=== English Building ===
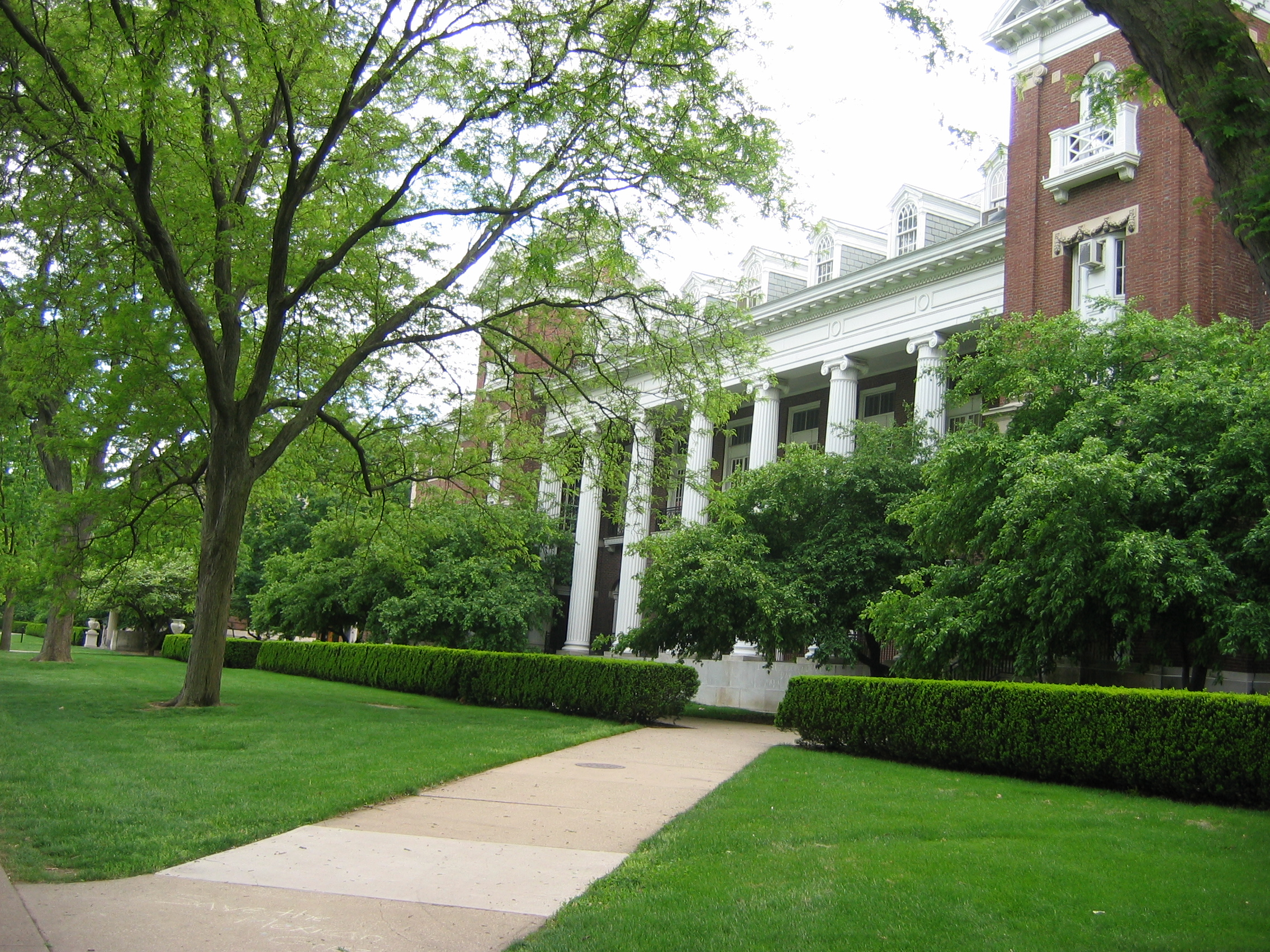
English Building

Built in 1905, the English Building was designed by McKim, Mead & White, a firm known for Beaux-Arts architecture. It was originally known as the "Woman's Building." At that time, according to Senator Henry Dunlap, it was supposed to "provide for every aspect of a women's education." This included hosting Household Science with its practice apartment, practice kitchens and dietetics classroom, the Child Development Study Program, a gymnasium, and a pool. The plan of the earliest building only included the westernmost portion of the building, as well as parts of the southern and northern legs.

Influenced by a new campus plan, an addition, designed by William Carbys Zimmerman, was added in 1913 to the Quad side of the Women's Building. This new addition of classrooms and meeting rooms formed the square shaped plan and called for the creation the East side, two-story, white portico. Another addition was completed in 1923 by James M. White.

In 1947, the Woman's Building was renamed Bevier Hall in honor of Isabel Bevier, the founder of the Home Economics Department in 1900. This name lasted until the new Bevier Hall on Goodwin Avenue was dedicated in 1956. At that time it was renamed the English Building as the English Department took over. Among students on campus, the legend has it that a student drowned in a swimming pool and continues to haunt the building today. Today, the English Building is home to the English department and lies north of Lincoln Hall.

=== Henry Administration Building ===
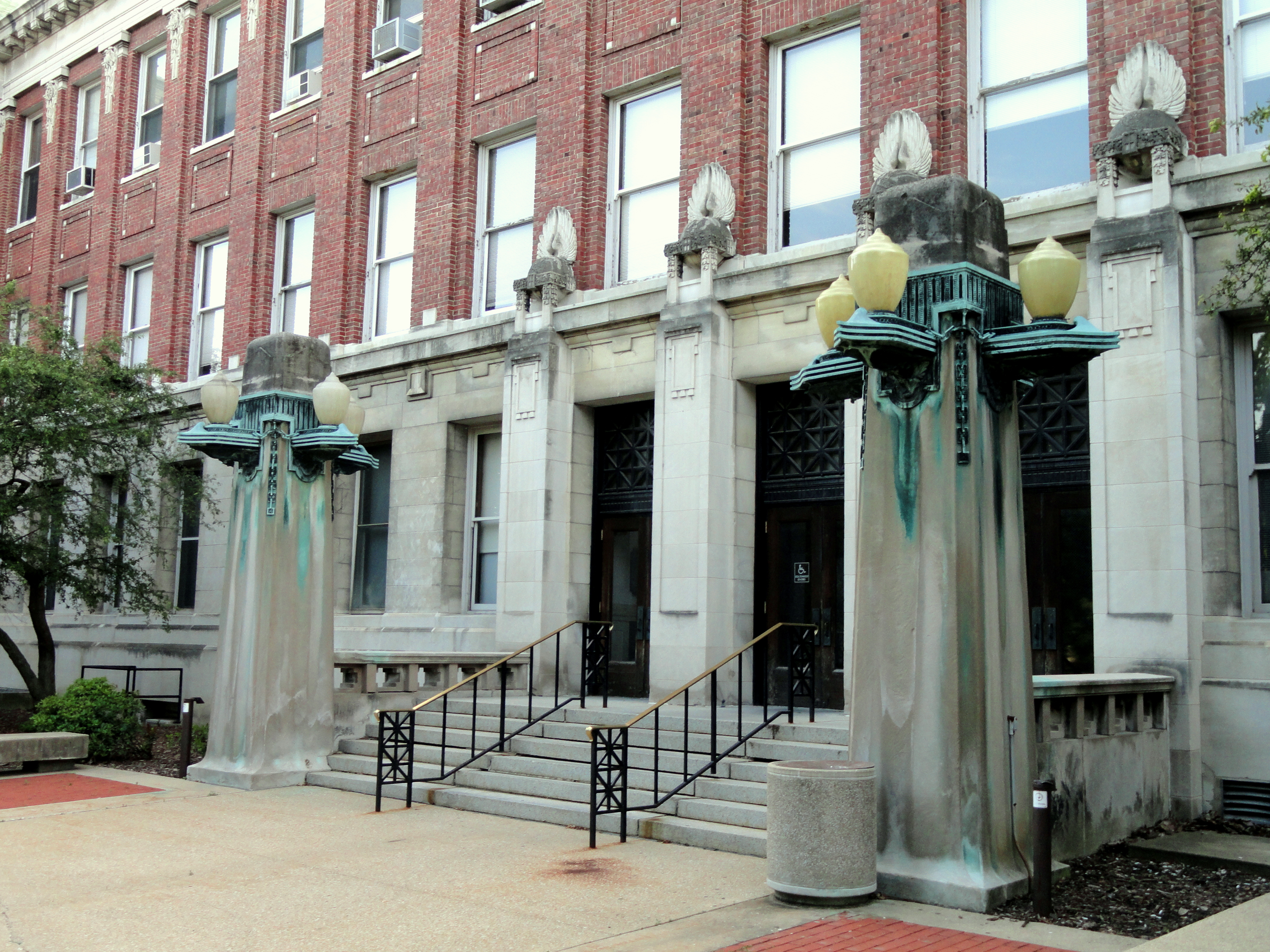
East entrance to the Henry Administration Building

The David Dodds Henry Administration Building is north of the English Building and houses primarily administrative offices, including University Student Financial Services & Cashier Operations (USFSCO), as well as several classrooms. The building is named after David Henry, the university president from 1955 to 1971.

=== Altgeld Hall ===
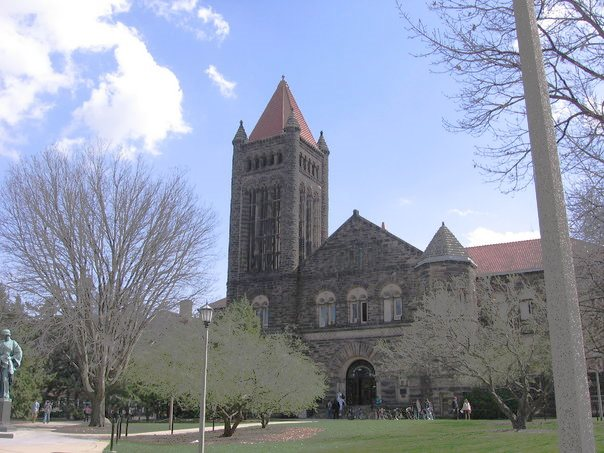
Altgeld Hall

Named after former Illinois governor John Peter Altgeld, Altgeld Hall marks the northwest corner of the Quad between the Henry Administration Building and the Illini Union on the corner of Wright and Green Streets. Opened as the Library Hall, the building also served as the Law Building and now is the home of the Department of Mathematics. Designed by Nathan Clifford Ricker, the Romanesque building was the compromise between John Altgeld's preference of Gothic revival style and the classical architecture desired by the board of trustees. The tower was modeled after the Allegheny County Courthouse in Pittsburgh and the entryway after the Ames Free Library in Easton, Massachusetts. The building is one of Altgeld's castles, inspired by Governor Altgeld's interest in Germanic architecture; Southern Illinois University Carbondale, Illinois State University, Eastern Illinois University and Northern Illinois University have similar structures. The tower has housed the Altgeld Chimes since 1920.

=== Alma Mater ===
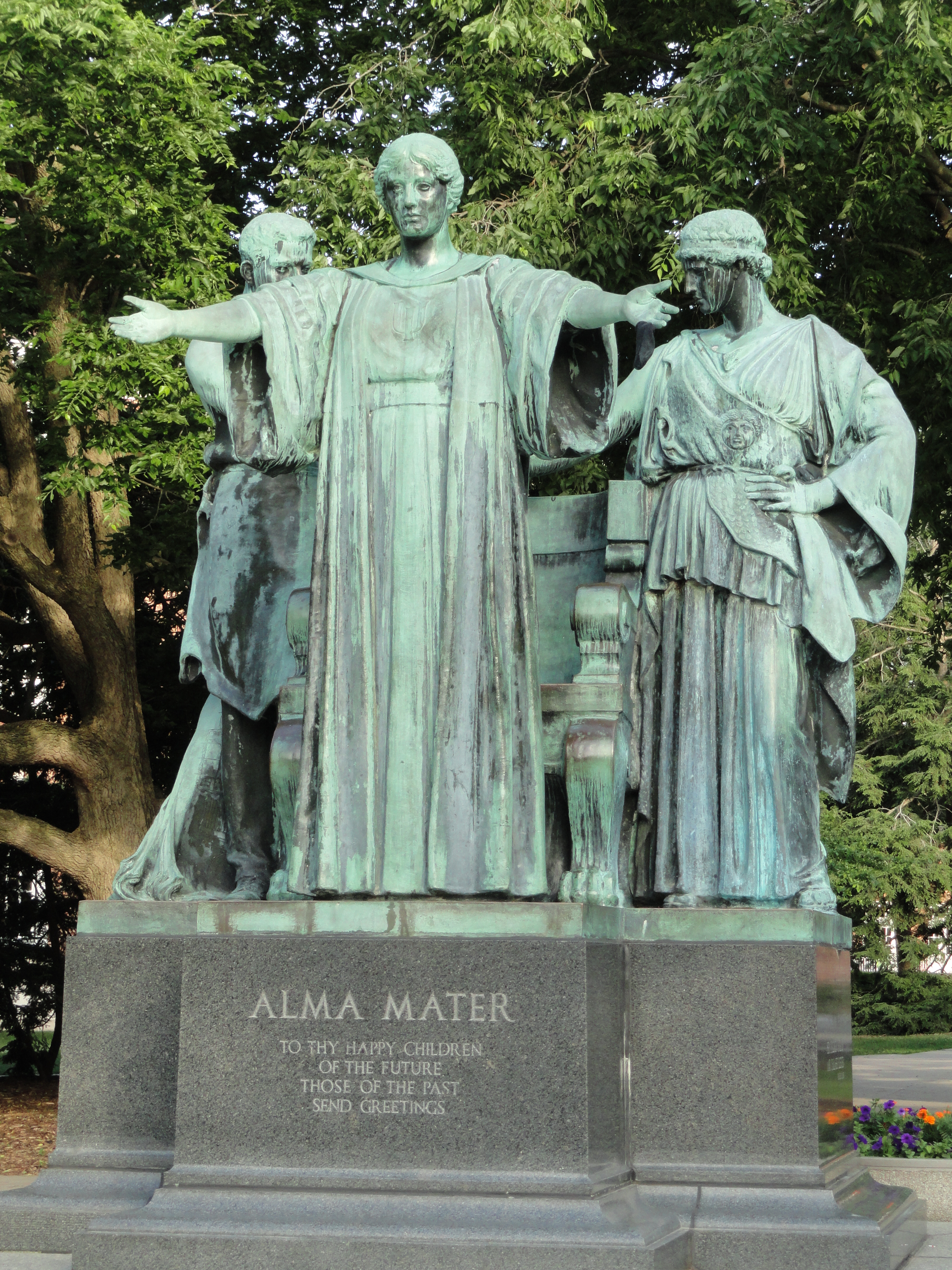
Alma Mater – UIUC

Planted between Altgeld Hall and the Illini Union is the bronze Alma Mater statue by sculptor Lorado Taft. The 10,000-pound statue depicts a mother-figure wearing academic robes and flanked by two attendant male and female figures representing "Learning" and "Labor" after the university's motto. The 1929 statue is iconic for the university and a popular backdrop for student graduation photos.

== Nearby buildings ==
=== Krannert Center for the Performing Arts ===
Built in 1969, the Krannert Center is a five-stage theater complex. It houses the Tryon Festival Theater, Follinger Great Hall, Colwell Playhouse, and Studio Theater. It also houses an outdoor amphitheater. The building is home to all the Performing arts at the university, and holds the offices for the Theater and Opera Departments. The second level of the building houses several rehearsal rooms as well as production shops and offices.

=== Main Library ===
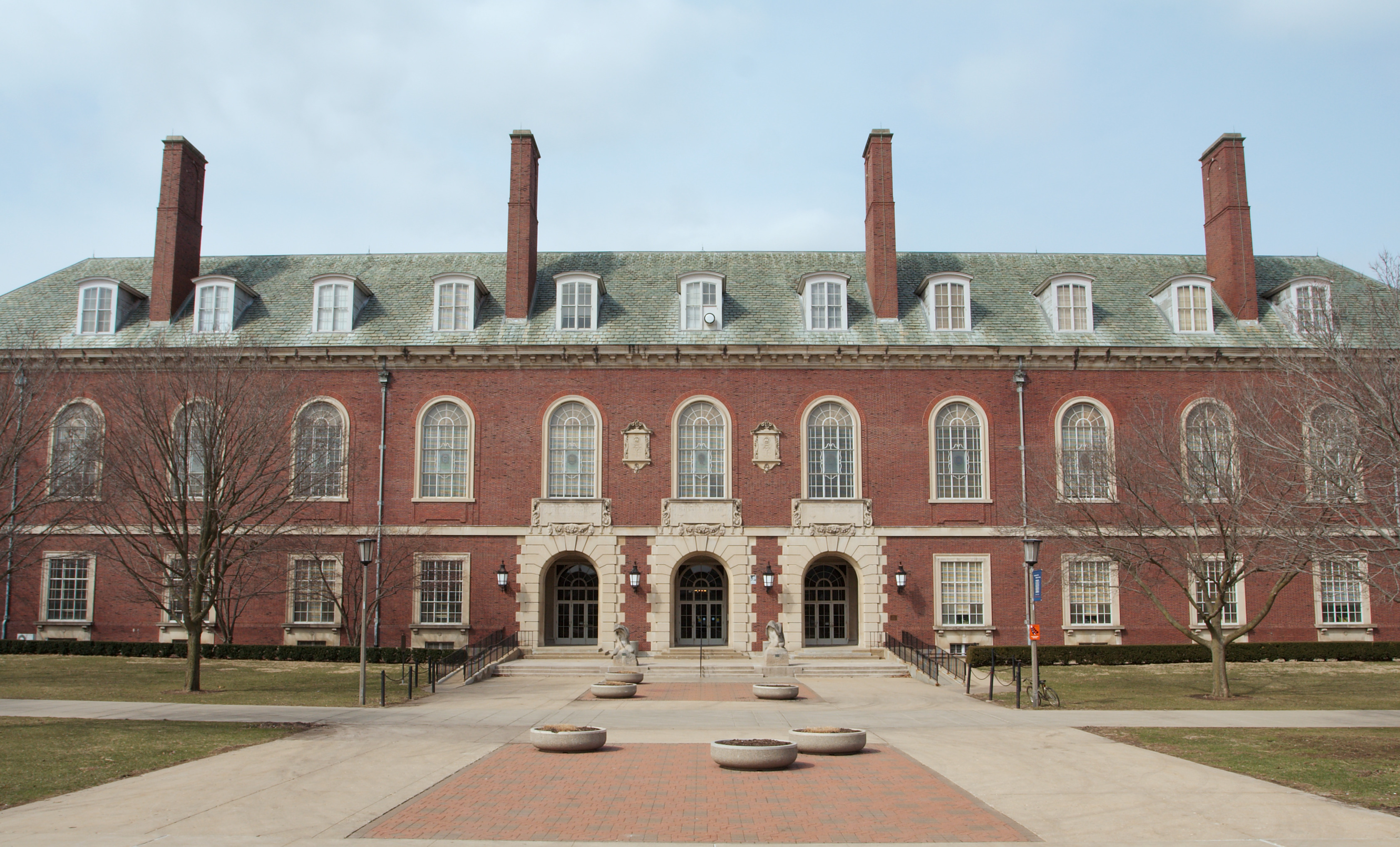
Main Library

The Main Library is located south of Gregory Hall between Armory Drive and Gregory Drive. The UIUC libraries house the largest collection of books of any public university in the United States, reaching over thirteen million volumes. This number also makes it the third largest academic library overall, behind those of Harvard University and Yale University.

=== Undergraduate Library ===
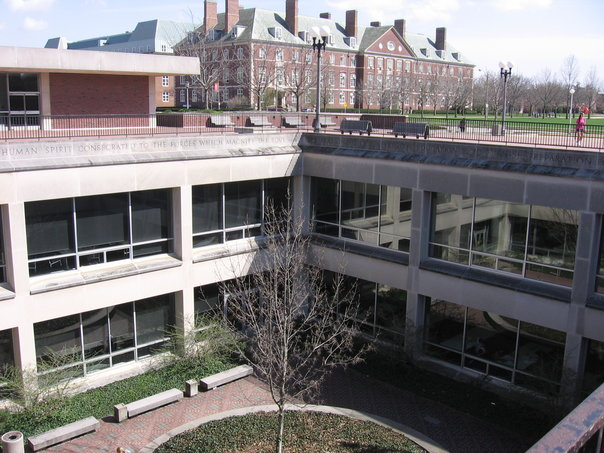
Undergrad Library and Mumford Hall

The Undergraduate Library (Undergrad Library for short) is located due east of the Main Library and west of the Morrow Plots. The library consists of two underground levels with an open courtyard in the center. It is connected to the Main Library by way of a tunnel. Since May 13, 2022, the Undergraduate Library has been closed to students while it is being transformed into a new Archives and Special Collections building.

=== Smith Memorial Hall ===
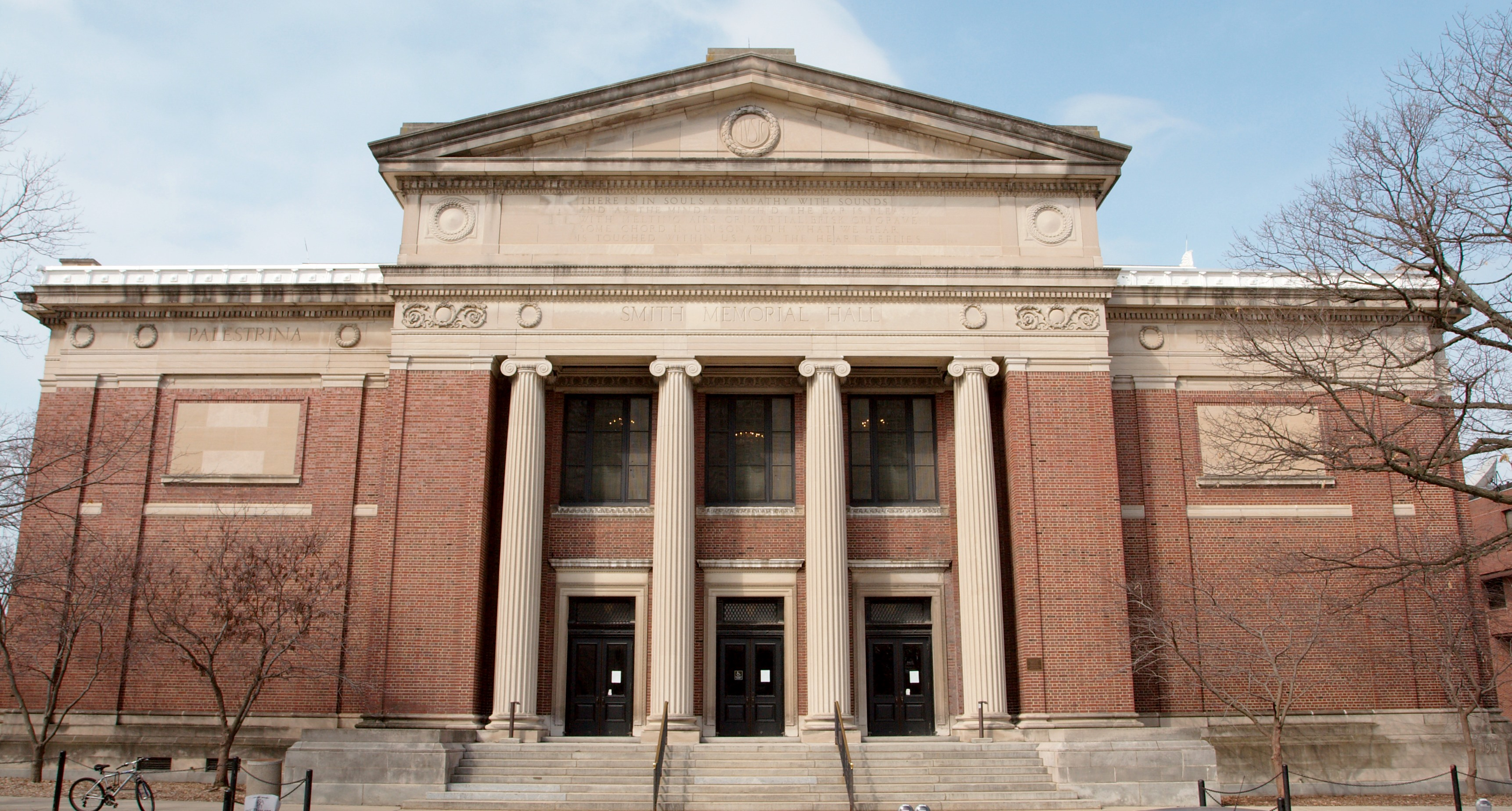
Smith Memorial Hall

Completed in 1920, Smith Memorial Hall was the first University building constructed from funds which were not state-appropriated. Built to house the School of Music, funds were provided by Thomas J. Smith, a lawyer and trustee of the university, as a memorial to his wife, Tina Weeden Smith. The designer was James M. White, the University Architect. The building was placed on the National Register of Historic Places.

Smith Hall is located between the Foreign Language Building and Foellinger Auditorium, but is off the Main Quad. The professors of voice, piano, and percussion have their offices there. The Steinway grand pianos and percussion equipment are located in this building.

=== Observatory ===
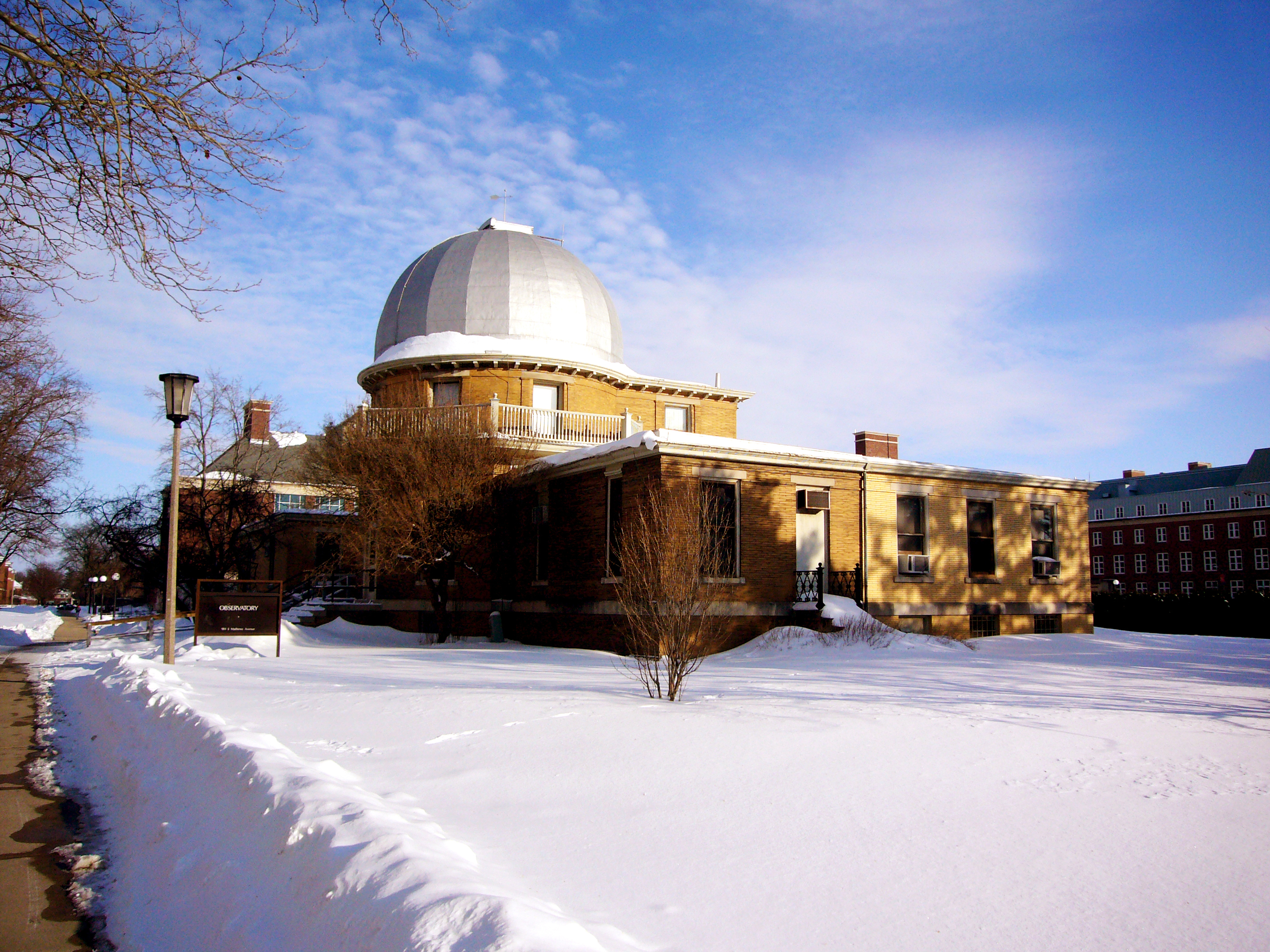
The Astronomical Observatory

The Observatory is located south of Smith Hall and north of the Morrow Plots. The building was designated as the National Historic Landmark by the Department of the Interior in 1989 as the birthplace in the early 1900s of photoelectric photometry through the work of Dr. Joel Stebbins. The Observatory is the site of frequent Astronomy Open House events and houses a 12-inch refractor telescope available for student and class use.

=== Carl R. Woese Institute for Genomic Biology ===
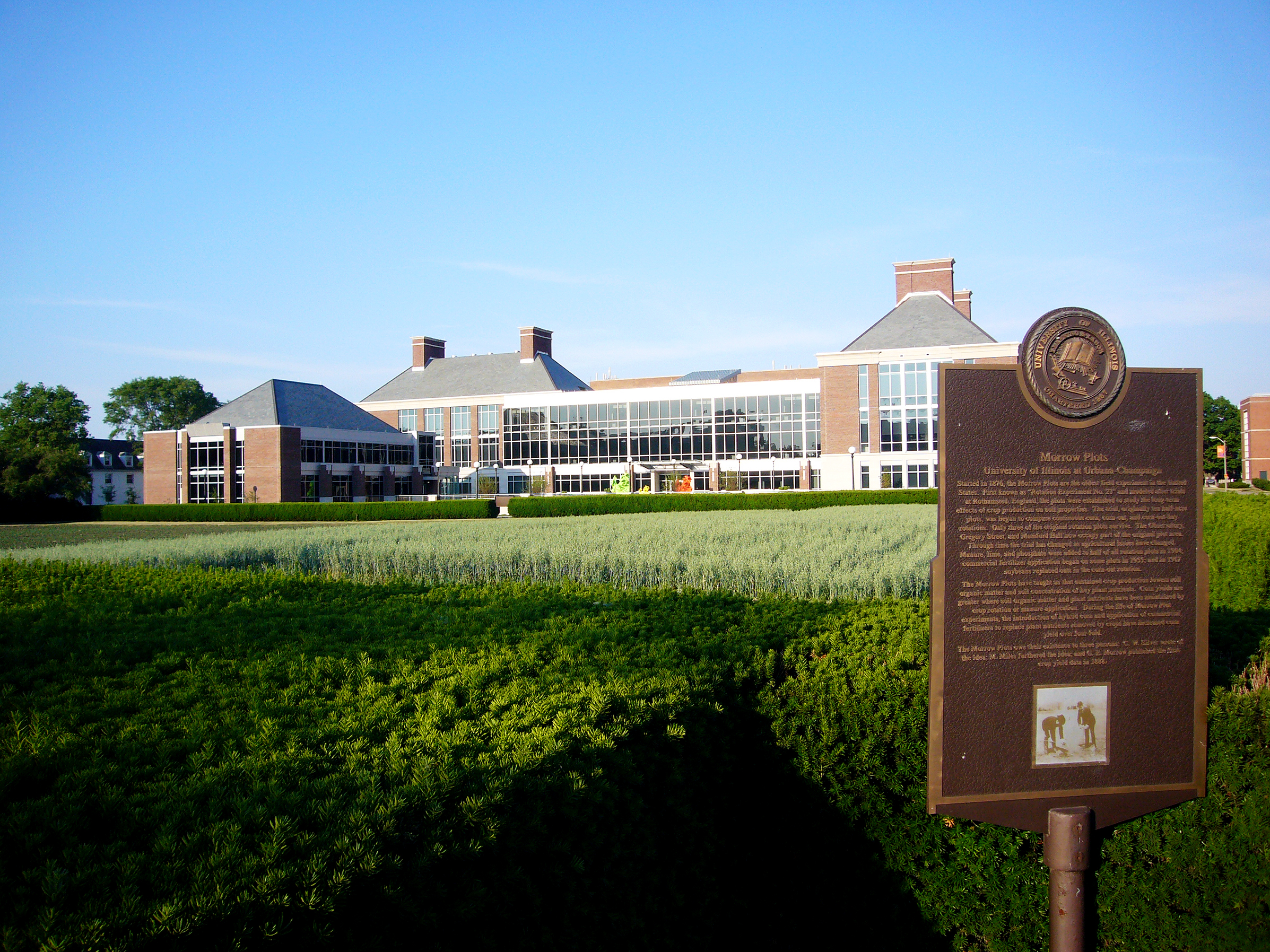
The Morrow Plot with Institute for Genomic Biology at the background

The Carl R. Woese Institute for Genomic Biology is one of the newest facilities on campus and lies just east of the Morrow Plots. Completed in November 2006, the 186,000-square-foot (17,300 m^{2}) building houses researchers in Systems Biology, Cellular and Metabolic Engineering, and Genome Technology. Formerly known as Institute for Genomic Biology, the institute was established in 2003 to advance life science research and stimulate bio-economic development in the state of Illinois.

=== Bevier Hall ===
Bevier Hall, named for Isabel Bevier, was built in 1955. It is immediately east of the newly built Institute for Genomic Biology.

=== Freer Hall ===
Originally known as the Women's Gymnasium, the Freer Hall was designed by architect Charles A. Platt and was completed in 1931. Freer Hall is east of and across Goodwin Avenue from Bevier Hall. It is also part of the Division of Campus Recreation and houses a full swimming pool, gym, and facilities.

The Freer Hall is placed on the National Register of Historic Places as part of the schematic Platt nomination.

=== CRCE ===
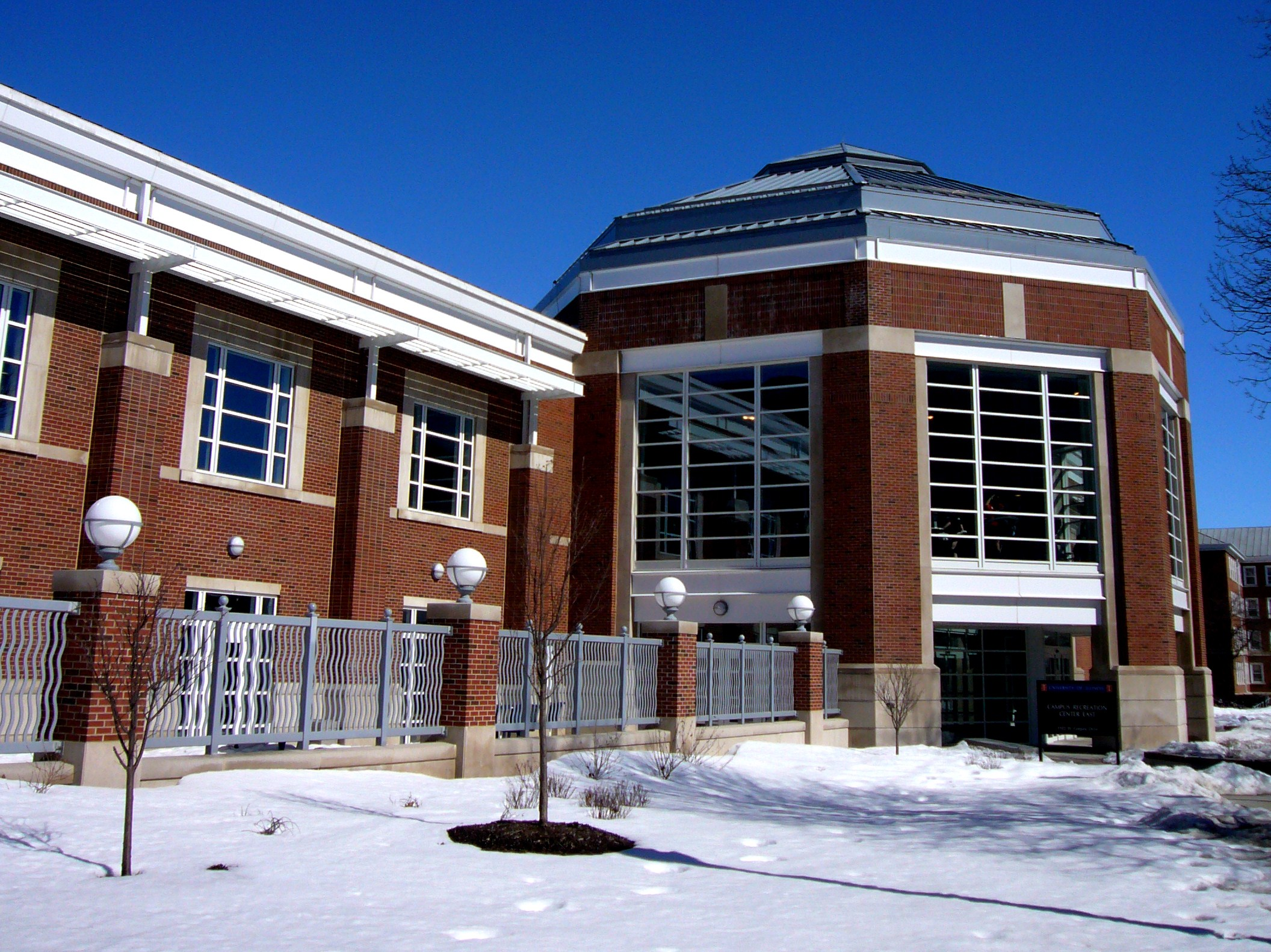
CRCE main entrance

The Campus Recreation Center – East (CRCE) is east of Freer Hall on the Gregory Drive. The facility was open in Spring 2005 and has 110,000 square feet (10,000 m^{2}) of activity space with an aquatic center, racquetball courts, gymnasium and a 3-lane indoor track.

== Bardeen (North) Engineering Quad ==
Located north of Green Street, the Bardeen Engineering Quad is home to buildings of the College of Engineering. The Engineering Campus is the colloquial name for the portions of campus surrounding the Bardeen Quadrangle and the Beckman Quadrangle at the College of Engineering. It is an area of approximately 30 square blocks, roughly bounded by Green Street on the south, Wright Street on the west, University Avenue on the north, and Gregory Street on the east.

== South Quad ==
The South Quad lies south across Gregory Drive from the Undergraduate Library and the Main Quad and is home to numerous buildings that are part of the College of ACES and the College of Business.

=== David Kinley Hall ===
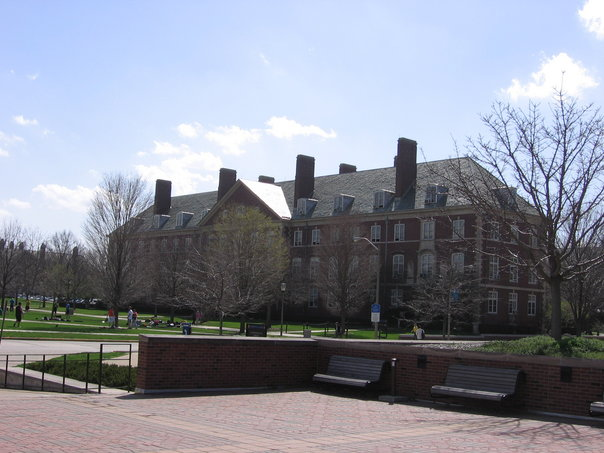
David Kinley Hall

David Kinley Hall (DKH) is home to the departments of Political Science and Economics, and is used for many classes in the College of LAS. David Kinley Hall is one of the northernmost buildings on the South Quad, lying directly across Gregory Drive from the Main Library. It is the last building by Charles Platt.

=== Surveying Building ===
The Surveying Building is located behind David Kinley Hall. It is one of the only two Jacobean style structure on the Urbana-Champaign campus.

=== Wohlers Hall ===
Wohlers Hall is primarily used for administrative offices within the College of Business and is located west of David Kinley Hall and the Architecture Building on Sixth Street. Its original name was the Commerce West building or Com West for short.

=== Architecture Building ===
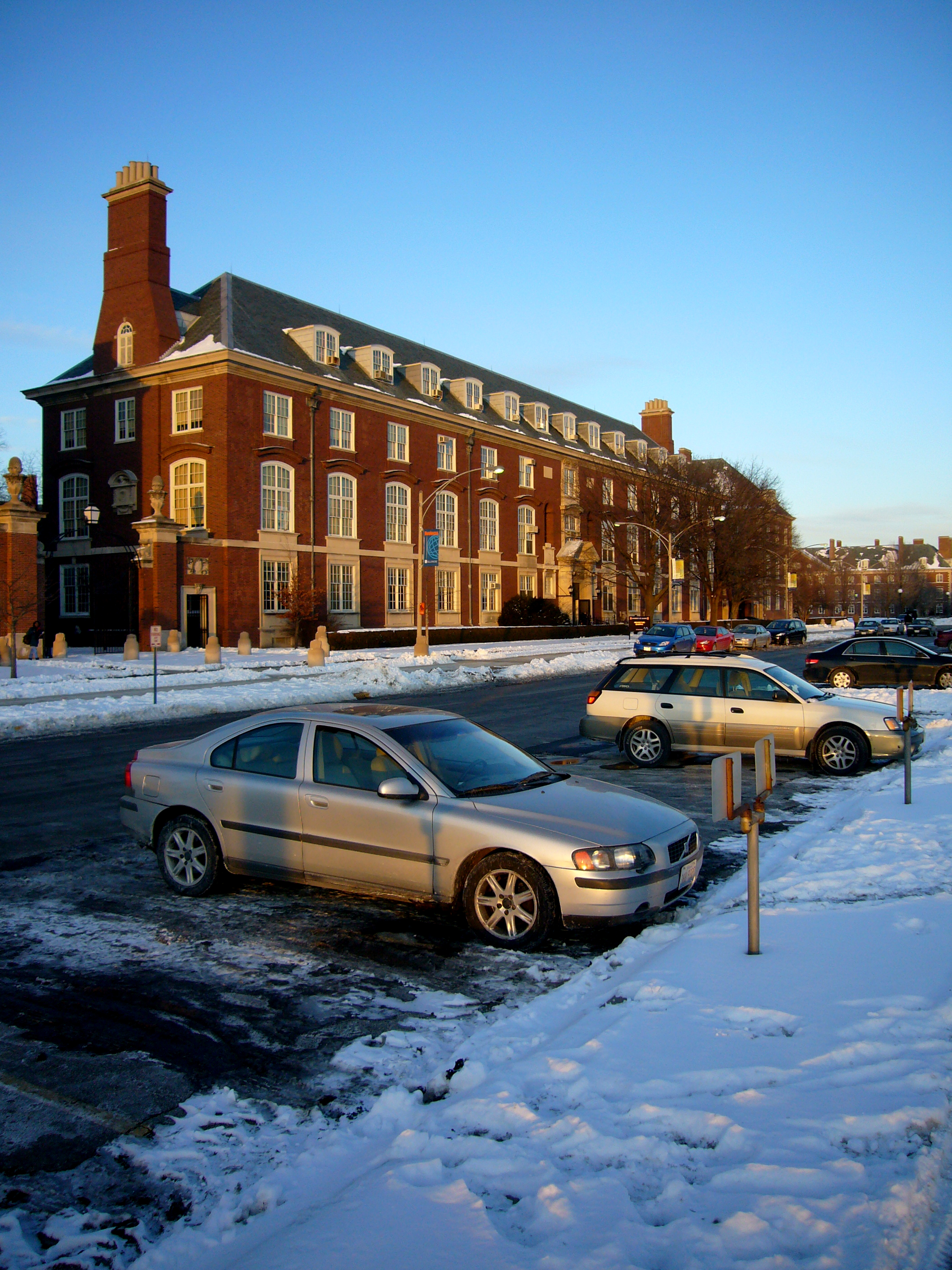
Architecture Building

Designed by Charles A. Platt, the Architecture Building is part of the College of Fine and Applied Arts' School of Architecture. The Architecture Building lies on Lorado Taft Drive and is between David Kinely Hall and Wohlers Hall.

Notable features within the building includes ornamental metal works by Louis Sullivan and a cast of Gates to Paradise of the Florence Baptistry. The Temple Buell Architecture Gallery (TBAG) once housed the university-owned Gregory Plaster Cast collection.

Today, the building houses college's Ricker Library of Architecture and Art, named after the first graduate Nathan C. Ricker. Today the Ricker Library contains more than 120,000 volumes and 33,000 serials, 35,000 microforms, and a small but burgeoning collection of videos, making it one of the largest of its kind in the United States. The Architecture Building is also the Home of main administrative office for the College of Fine & Applied Arts.

=== Mumford Hall ===
Mumford Hall is also on Gregory Drive and directly across the South Quad from David Kinley Hall. Mumford Hall is primarily used for administrative offices as well as classrooms for the College of ACES, and was named for former Dean of Agriculture Herbert W. Mumford.

Originally the Agriculture Building, the building was the first building on campus by Charles A. Platt and the first planned project according to the campus master plan.

=== Mumford House ===
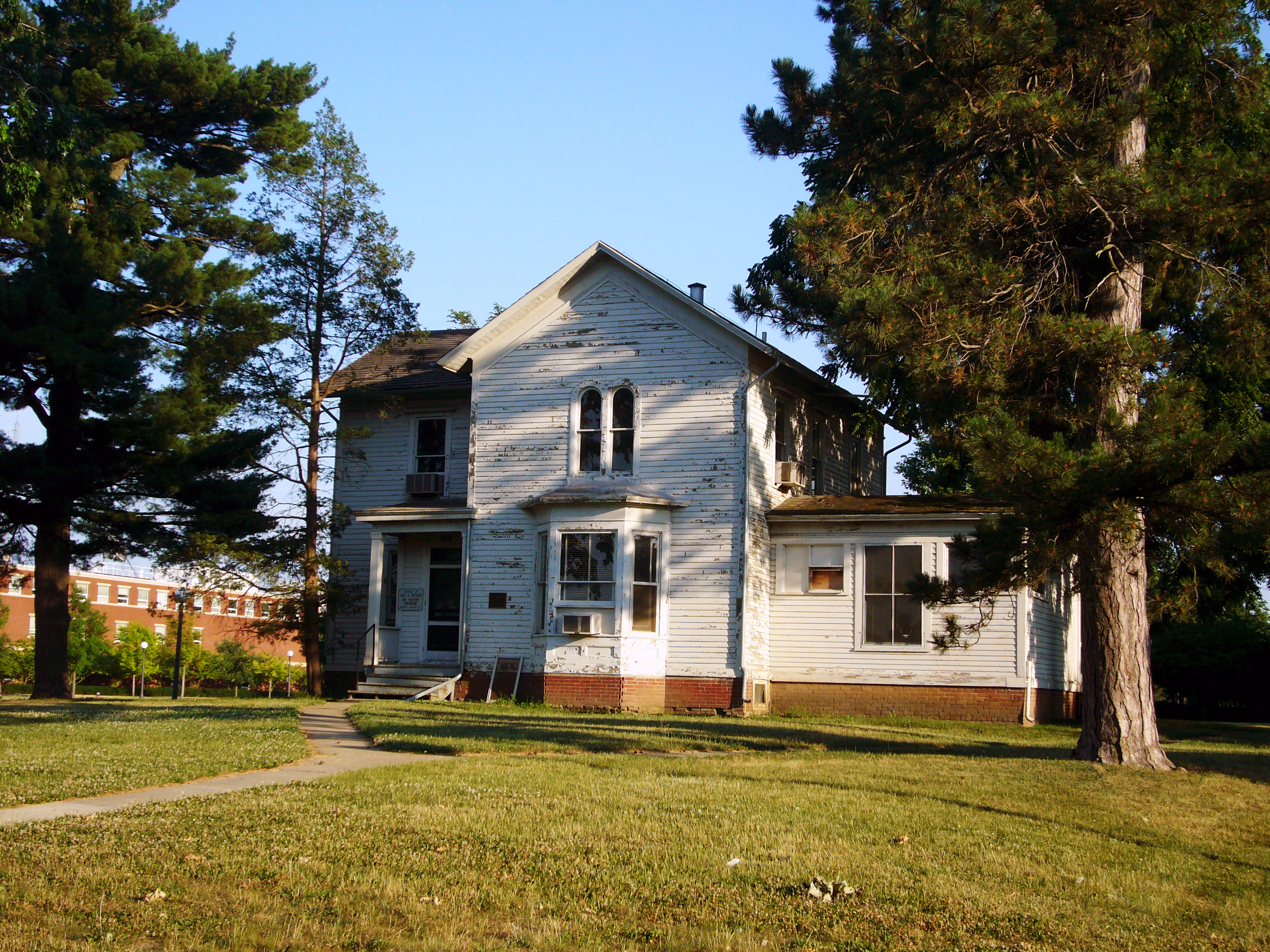
Mumford House

Mumford House is located north of the Temple Hoyne Buell Hall. Constructed in 1870 as a model farmhouse for the school's experimental farm, the Mumford House is the oldest structure on campus. The house was historically used as the official residence of the Dean of Agriculture, until the construction of the Davenport House on the site of today's Illini Union Bookstore. The farmhouse was named for former Dean of Agriculture Herbert W. Mumford and is listed on the National Register of Historic Places.

The university has proposed moving the structure to the south farm, where it would house a welcome center for the College of Agricultural, Consumer and Environmental Sciences. However, such action would disqualify the Mumford House's current historic status. The structure was on the 2006 Top 10 Statewide Endangered List, published by the Landmarks Preservation Council of Illinois, a preservation advocacy group based in Chicago.

Furthermore, the building has endured substantial damage as a result of poor upkeep and neglect. Mumford House remains locked and unoccupied almost all year. The only time people are allowed inside the building is when second year architecture students carry out an in-depth building study of the structure as part of an architectural technology course. The inside of the house is completely empty, and much of the interior finishes are deteriorating due to poor heating management. In the most recent building study, the architecture students discovered that nobody had been inside the building since the previous winter, and that the heaters had been left on throughout the entire summer.

On Wednesday, 11 March 2009, the University of Illinois Board of Trustees met and Mumford House was discussed. Chairman Shah stated that "Chancellor Herman has assured me that there is no intention of relocating Mumford House." Shah and at least 4 other Trustees made strong statements in support of the house remaining in its original location. Board Secretary Michelle Thompson was instructed to draft a resolution for their next meeting, stating that the Mumford House shall remain in its original location permanently. Shah requested that by the September meeting, which will be back in Urbana, that Mumford House be a board item and that Chancellor Herman have architectural plans for the house.

=== ACES Library and Information and Alumni Center ===
The ACES Library and Information and Alumni Center dominates the northern end of the South Quad and can be seen from very far away, especially because of its unusual appearance and octagonal shape. The building officially terminates the "Military Axis".

=== Turner Hall ===
Turner Hall is east of the ACES Library and is part of the College of ACES and home of the Department of Crop Sciences.

=== Animal Sciences Laboratory ===
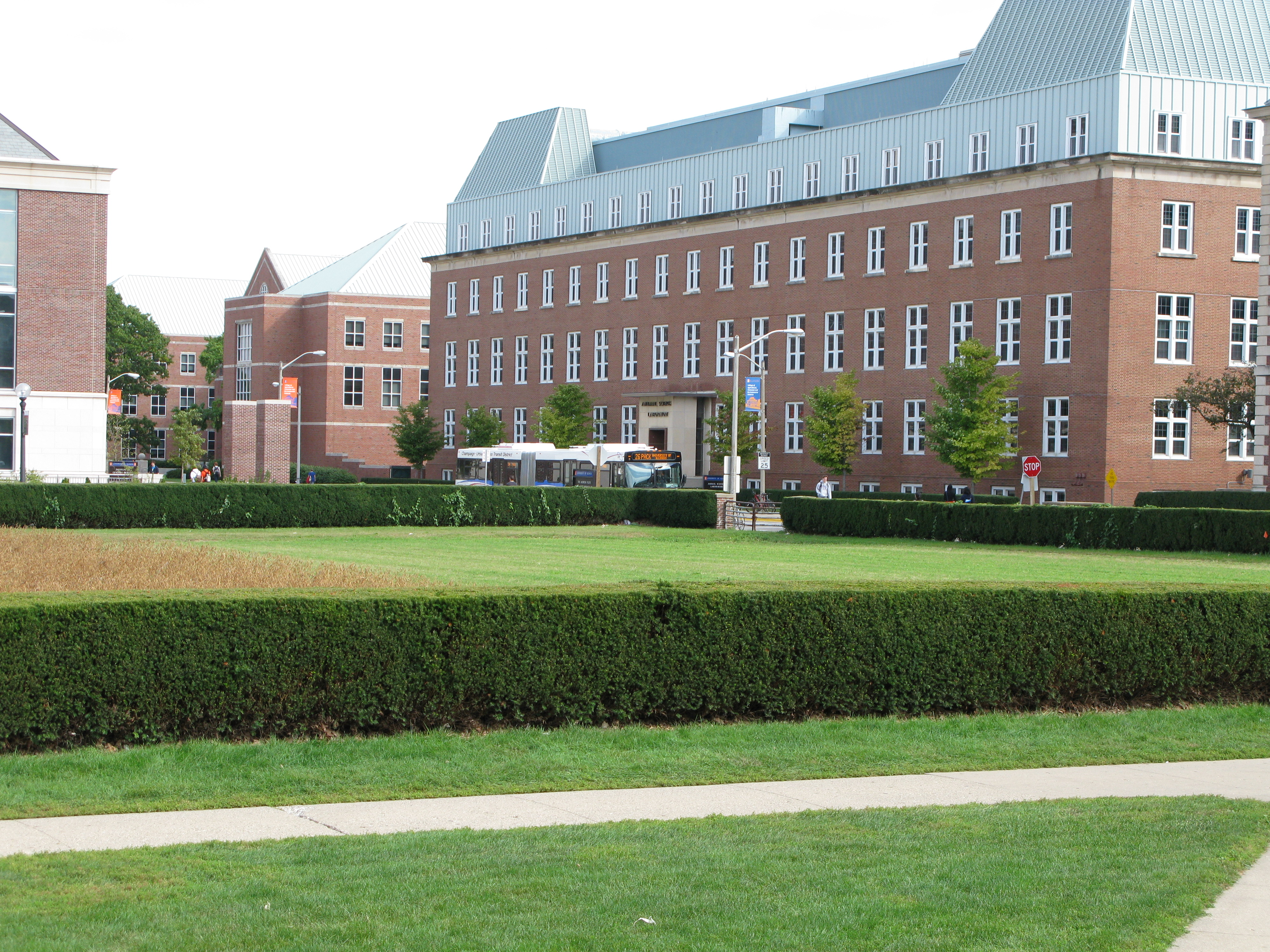
Animal Sciences Lab

The Animal Sciences Lab is adjacent to Mumford Hall to the east on Gregory Drive and is connected to Madigan Lab.

=== Madigan Laboratory ===
Madigan Lab is also part of the College of ACES and is immediately east of the Animal Sciences Lab on Gregory Drive and faces Goodwin Avenue. It can be seen from as far away as the Siebel Center along Goodwin.

=== Temple Hoyne Buell Hall ===
Temple Hoyne Buell Hall is due south of David Kinley Hall on the South Quad and is part of the College of Fine and Applied Arts. It houses the graduate division of the School of Architecture, as well as the Department of Landscape Architecture and the Department of Urban and Regional Planning.

The building, completed in 1997, is designed by Perkins+Will, in honor and made possible by the school alumnus and donor Temple Hoyne Buell.

=== Agriculture Engineering Sciences Building ===
The Agriculture Engineering Sciences Building is directly east and across the South Quad from Buell Hall and is part of the College of ACES.

=== Wood Engineering Lab ===
The Wood Engineering Lab is tucked behind the Agriculture Engineering Sciences Building and is part of the College of ACES.

=== Natural Resources Building ===
The Natural Resources Building is in the southwest corner of the South Quad. It houses the Illinois State Geological Survey and the Illinois Natural History Survey.

=== Stock Pavilion ===
The Stock Pavilion is at the southern terminus of the South Quad and marks the southern boundary of the main campus. Designed for the stock judging purposes, the structure is vacant. Several proposals had been presented for its rehabilitation and adaptive reuse, such as the home for the Ricker Library for Architecture and Arts.

=== Art East Annex Studio 1 ===
Located directly east of the Agriculture Engineering Sciences Building and directly south of the ACES library, Art East Annex Studio 1 houses the work studios for all second year and some third year students in the school of architecture. Previously the space was used for painting and sculpting students in Art+Design, after being converted from its original use as a maintenance garage for University vehicles. The original building was called the Farm Mechanics Building (later renamed the Agricultural Engineering Building), and was built in 1907 at a cost of $41,500, including an $8,500 addition in 1911. The "Tractor Laboratory and Garage" (present day architectural studio space) was added in 1924 and 1928. The upper levels of the original building contain studios for metals students in Art+Design. The studios have been undergoing long overdue renovations since 2007. 2008 changes include networking upgrades, a wood shop, a spray painting room, and a printing studio with plotters, laser cutters, and a CNC Machine. Future plans include the installation of furniture and basic appliances for student lounge spaces throughout the building (announced at the Fall 2007 studio open house). The building and its additions were designed by architect James White.

=== Art East Annex Studio 2 ===
Next door to the east of Art East Annex Studio 1, Art East Annex Studio 2 was constructed in 1905 at a cost of $18,000. The building was originally known as the Agronomy Building, and contained a field laboratory. The building now serves the school of Art+Design, and is undergoing upgrades similarly to Studio 1.

=== Flagg Hall ===
Flagg Hall is located on Fourth Street, neighboring Barton Hall and Noble Hall. Flagg Hall, formerly known as Flagg House, was built in 1953 and was a residence and dining hall. It is now used as studio space for students majoring in graphic design, industrial design, new media, and painting within the School of Art and Design. It holds a wood shop and finishing room in the basement. The building as a whole is in a state of disrepair.

=== Noble Hall ===
Noble Hall was built in 1952. Like Flagg Hall, it used to be a residence hall but is now affiliated with the College of Fine and Applied Arts. Its lower-level houses an ink lab, which makes available a selection of traditional ink printing and binding techniques. Noble Hall also offers research project and doctoral student workspace for the School of Urban and Regional Planning.

=== Art and Design Building ===
The Art and Design Building is located on the Northeast corner of Fourth and Peabody in Champaign. It was constructed during 1958–1959 and called the Art and Architecture building. It now houses the main office and classrooms for the School of Art and Design. The Link Gallery, which features university and high school student artwork throughout the year, connects the Art and Design building with the Krannert Art Museum. The A+D building hosts a variety of resources for Art Students. These include computer labs, printers, studio and workshop space, and a checkout window allowing students to rent equipment.

=== Education Building ===
The Education Building is directly east from the Krannert Art Museum and houses the College of Education. The Education Building was built in 1964 and designed by the university architectural professor A. Richard Williams.

=== Siebel Center for Design ===
Opened in August 2022, the Siebel Center for Design is an interdisciplinary space with labs open to all students on campus. It was built partly with a $25 million gift from alumnus Thomas Siebel.

== Residence halls ==
University housing for undergraduates is provided through twenty-four residence halls in both Urbana and Champaign. All undergraduates living within the undergraduate halls are required to have a meal plan. Graduate housing is usually offered through two graduate residence halls, restricted to those in sophomore year or above, and through three university-owned apartment complexes. One of the newer residence halls, Nugent Hall, has rooms with Beckwith Residential Support Services for students with severe physical disabilities.

=== Urbana North ===
==== Busey–Evans ====
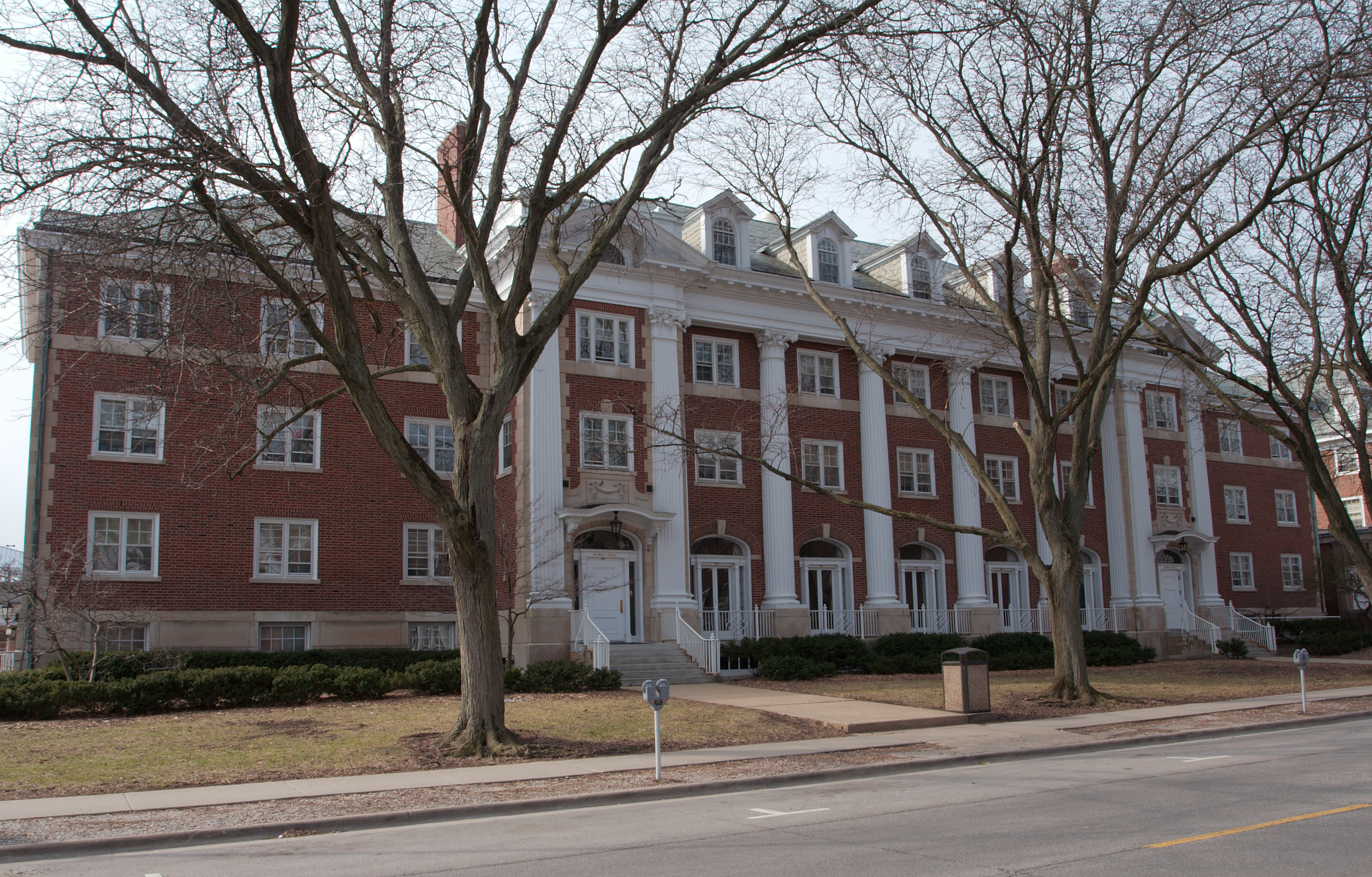
Busey–Evans Residence Halls

Busey Hall was the first residence hall built by the university, with its cornerstone laid on Saturday, October 21, 1916. Evans Hall was added in 1924–26. Men were the first occupants of the hall, but Busey and Evans have traditionally been female-only. Evans started housing men in fall 2019. They are listed on the National Register of Historic Places.

==== Illinois Street (ISR) ====
Built in September 1964, The Illinois Street Residence Halls include the 5 story Townsend Hall and the 12 story Wardall Hall. Since 1977, the Illini Railroad Club has maintained a large model railroad layout in the basement of Townsend Hall. The Innovation Living Learning Community and the Honors Living Learning Community are housed within the building. The Sustainable Living Learning Community will be moved from the Lincoln Avenue Residence Halls to ISR in Fall 2024.

==== Lincoln Avenue (LAR) ====
LAR opened its doors in September 1949, originally known simply as the "Women's Residence Halls". It opened as an all female hall; however, starting in the fall of 2011, LAR was gradually converted to a co-ed hall. In 1984 its wings were named Leonard Hall and Shelden Hall. LAR is home to the Sustainability Living Learning Community as well as the Scholars Community.

==== Allen Hall ====
An addition to the west of the Lincoln Avenue Residence Halls (LAR), Allen Hall was built in 1958 and was originally all female, however it has since been converted to co-ed living. The first floor north wing is a "gender inclusive" community in which anyone can live in-room with another person of any gender identity. Allen is also home of "Unit One", the first living-learning community program at the University of Illinois, beginning in 1971. Unit One is known for a liberal arts feel within a large, Research 1 campus, and brings guests-in-residence to stay for a week at a time to do educational programming.

=== Urbana South ===
==== Florida Avenue (FAR) ====
FAR was completed in September 1966, FAR consists of Oglesby Hall and Trelease Hall. This complex is open to both men and women. FAR is home to the Health Professions Living Learning Community as well as the Women in Math, Science, and Engineering Community. Because of the long walking distance to most classroom buildings, FAR is both literally and figuratively "far" from the main campus.

==== Pennsylvania Avenue (PAR) ====
PAR includes Babcock, Blaisdell, Carr, and Saunders Halls. Built in 1962, they were the first coeducational residence halls on campus, being split equally between men and women. Saunders Hall is home to the Global Crossroads Living Learning Community, while Babcock is home to the Intersections Living Learning Community.

=== Ikenberry Commons/Champaign ===
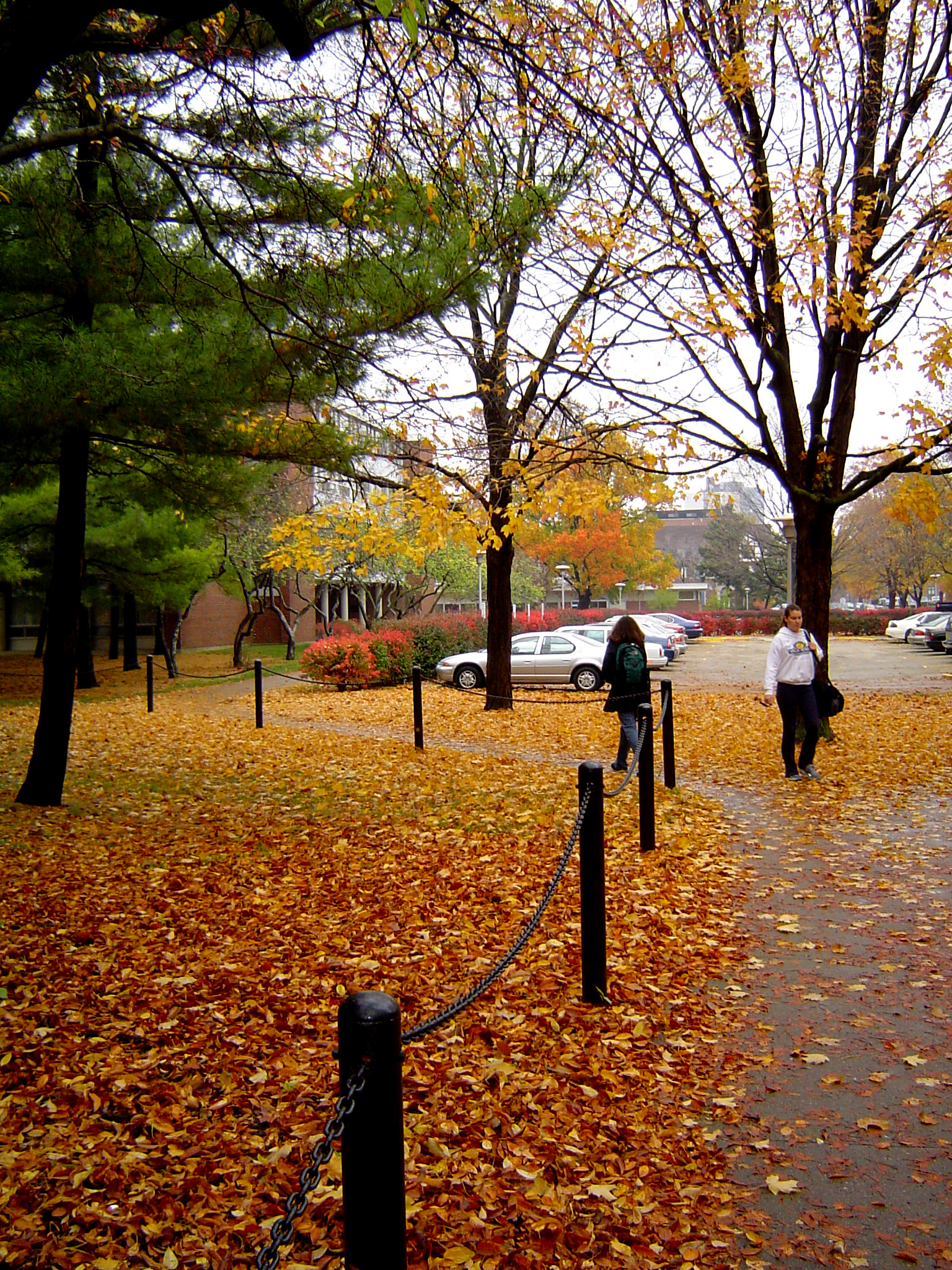
Ikenberry Commons: Snyder Hall, Weston Hall & Scott Hall

The residence halls in Champaign originally consisted of the Gregory Drive Residence Halls, the Peabody Drive Residence Halls, and the 4th Street Residence Halls.

The Gregory Drive Residence Halls consisted of Forbes Hall, Garner Hall, and Hopkins Hall. The Peabody Drive Residence Halls consisted of Scott Hall, Snyder Hall, and Weston Hall. These six halls were commonly nicknamed the "Six Pack" due to their identical, connected structures and due to the persona of the area being where partiers lived on campus. Finally, the 4th Street Residence Halls consisted of Clark House, Barton House, Flagg House, Lundgren House, and Noble House. Taft Hall and Van-Doren Hall were later added, Barton and Lundgren were converted into halls, and the other buildings in the 4th Street Halls were repurposed.

To make room for newer residence halls, the housing department began tearing down older residence halls and buildings. The Illini Orange, a mailroom, snack bar, and bus stop, and the Peabody and Gregory Drive dining halls were demolished in 2008 to make room for the new Student Dining and Residential Programs Building (SDRP), which opened in 2010. Garner Hall was demolished in 2012 to make room for Nugent Hall, then Forbes Hall was demolished in 2013 to make room for Wassaja Hall.

The Champaign area was then renamed for the former University of Illinois president, Stanley Ikenberry, and the area became known as "Ikenberry Commons" in 2010.

==== Ikenberry North ====
The Ikenberry North neighborhood contains six halls: Barton, Lundgren, Hopkins, Weston, Nugent, and the newest hall, Wassaja. Barton and Lundgren opened in 1941 while Hopkins was built in 1958 (Weston, along with Scott and Snyder, opened in 1961). Half of Nugent Hall opened in 2010, and construction was completed on Nugent Hall in 2012. Wassaja opened in 2016. They are all located along Gregory Drive, First, and Fourth Streets. Hopkins is home to the LEADS Living Learning Community, Weston is home to the Weston Exploration Living Learning Community, Nugent is home to the Honors Living Learning Community and the Beckwith Residential Support Services program, and Wassaja is the home to the Business Living Learning Community which began in the fall 2018.

Students with disabilities are provided distinct housing options to accommodate their needs. The university is known for being one of the first universities to provide accommodations for students with disabilities. Students with moderate to severe disabilities can opt to live in Nugent Hall, supported by the Beckwith Residential Support Services. The Beckwith Program opened in 1981 and moved to Nugent Hall in 2010. Through the Beckwith program, students are assisted by an administrative team to fully learn full how to manage academic life, and personal life. The first floor of Nugent Hall is equipped with a wide array of accommodations such as a lift system, proximity card readers to open doors, a motion activated sink, and a wireless paging system to call staff. Similar features can also be found throughout the residence hall, such as automatic doors, an electric, hospital-style bed, automated sinks, and access to accessible exercise equipment.

==== Ikenberry South ====
The Ikenberry South Residence Halls include Scott, Snyder, Taft, Van-Doren, and Bousfield. They are located along Peabody Drive, Euclid, and Fourth Streets. Snyder Hall is the only substance-free residence hall on campus. Bousfield Hall opened in 2013 and is the first hall within University Housing community with single suite style rooms and double suites with a shared bath for four residents. Scott Hall is home to the Transfer Community.

=== Graduate student housing ===
Both Daniels and Sherman Hall are upperclassmen and graduate student residence halls. Currently, both Daniels and Sherman Hall house students that are in their sophomore year or beyond. Students who live in these halls are not required to purchase a meal plan.

=== University apartments ===
In lieu of privately owned apartments, the housing department also offers apartments instead of traditional dormitories. These apartments are most commonly utilized by graduate students, students with families, and faculty. Freshman cannot live in these apartments.

Orchard Downs is located about a mile from campus, Goodwin-Green is located near the Illinois Street Residence Halls, and Ashton Woods is located near the university's research park.
