= Harold D. Guither =

American agricultural economist (1927–2024)

- Born: June 16, 1927; Walnut, Illinois, U.S.
- Died: September 13, 2024 (aged 97); Davenport, Iowa, U.S.

Harold Daniel Guither (June 16, 1927 – September 13, 2024) was an American agricultural economist and writer.

== Life and career ==
Guither was born in Walnut, Illinois, on June 16, 1927. He attended Walnut Community High School. He spent 14 months in the United States Navy at the end of World War II. He graduated from the University of Illinois College of Agriculture with a B.S. in agriculture and an M.S. in agricultural economics. He was an agricultural economist for Doane Agricultural Service in St. Louis, Missouri.

In 1956, Guither joined the editorial staff at the University of Illinois, advising in agricultural communications. He obtained a Ph.D. in agricultural economics in 1962. In 1966, he joined the Department of Agricultural Economics. Guither was secretary-treasurer of the Illinois Society of Professional Farm Managers and Rural Appraisers for 10 years. He retired from the University of Illinois in 1995. He was a member of the American Agricultural Economics Association. He received the 1999 ACES Award of Merit.

In 1998, he authored a book on the history of the animal rights movement. He took a "middle of the road" position on animal rights and described the sociological characteristics of the movement. It has been described as an attempt "to provide an unbiased examination of the paths and goals of the members of the animal rights movement and of its detractors".

Guither died in Davenport, Iowa, on September 13, 2024, at the age of 97.

== Selected publications ==
- Food Lobbyists: Behind the Scenes of Food and Agri-Politics (1980)
- The American Farm Crisis: An Annotated Bibliography With Analytical Introductions (1987)
- Animal Rights and Animal Welfare: Implications for Professional Farm Managers and Rural Appraisers (1994)
- Animal Rights: History and Scope of a Radical Social Movement (1998)
- Professional Services for Agriculture: 75 Years of Farm Management, Rural Appraising and Consulting (2004)
