= Mumford =

Mumford may refer to:

== Places ==
In the United States

- Mumford, Missouri, an unincorporated community
- Mumford, New York, a hamlet in the town of Wheatland, New York
- Mumford, Texas, an unincorporated community
- Mumford High School in Detroit, Michigan

Elsewhere

- Mumford, Ghana
- Mount Mumford, a mountain in Antarctica

== Music and film ==
- Mumford (film), a 1999 American comedy-drama film
- Mumford & Sons, a British folk rock band

== Other uses ==
- Mumford (surname), people with the surname Mumford
- Amazing Mumford, a Muppet character on Sesame Street
- Mumford procedure, an orthopedic surgical procedure used in shoulder surgery
