= Isabel Bevier =

Founding American educator in home economics

Isabel Bevier (November 14, 1860 – March 17, 1942) was one of the pioneers in the development of the scientific study of women’s labor in the home, today known as "home economics". In 1900 she began developing the “household science” (later called “Home Economics”) program at the University of Illinois at Urbana-Champaign.

== Early life and education ==
Bevier was born on a farm in central Ohio in 1860, the youngest of 9 children. From a very early age she was destined to become a teacher. After only 2 years of high school she enrolled in the University of Wooster (just north of Columbus, Ohio) where she earned a bachelor's degree in 1885. After teaching in high school she returned to earn a master's degree in Latin and German in 1888.

The educational experiences that changed the course of her professional life began when she enrolled in a summer chemistry course at the Case School for Applied Science (today known as Case Western Reserve University). She was the first woman to apply to this program. Sparked by an interest in chemistry she continued to study applied chemistry issues at Harvard, Wesleyan University and MIT. Through her studies with Wilbur O. Atwater, a pioneer in agricultural chemistry, Bevier began work on food science and nutrition. At MIT she worked with Ellen Richards, first president of the American Home Economics Association (AHEA) in 1908, on her ground breaking food and sanitary chemistry.

== Teaching career ==
Beverly Bartow quotes a letter of recommendation for Bevier in 1885 stating, “She has the ‘teacher tact’ that must be born in one, for it cannot be acquired."

Bevier’s high school teaching career was brief. She taught Latin and English for one year (1885) at Shelby High School in Ohio and then two years (1885-1887) in Mt. Vernon, Ohio teaching botany, English and math.

In 1888 she began her career in higher education. For nine years she was a Professor of Natural Sciences at Pennsylvania College for Women (today known as Chatham University) in Pittsburg. She went on to teach at Lake Erie College in 1898-99.

In 1900 she was recruited by Andrew Draper to develop a program in Household Science (Home Economics) at the University of Illinois at Urbana-Champaign. For the next 21 years she taught and provided leadership to one of the most influential Home Economics programs in the United States.

== Establishment of Household Science at the University of Illinois ==
Prior to Bevier’s arrival at Illinois, John Milton Gregory had hired Louisa Catherine Allen in 1874 to establish a domestic science program, but this program was ended in 1880. Bevier was not interested in creating a cooking and sewing school, she was determined to create a program based on science that addressed the everyday issues in the lives of women, children and families. She along with Eugene Davenport, Dean of the College of Agriculture, specifically chose the name “Household Science” for the program to emphasize the “science” aspect.

== Leadership of the American Home Economics Association (AHEA) ==
Isabel Bevier was in the forefront of the professionalization of home economics. She was part of the initial group that founded AHEA in 1908. That year she participated in the drafting of the organization’s Bylaws and was elected First Vice-President. In 1911 she succeeded Ellen Richards as the President of AHEA. She also served on the editorial board of the society’s first scientific journal, the Journal of Home Economics.

== Contributions to home front in World War I ==
During World War I, home economists played a significant role in helping American families manage food shortages and the lack of other basic resources. Isabel Bevier served as the Illinois Chair of the Thrift and Conservation Department of the Woman’s Committee of the Council of National Defense. Later she was Director of Home Economics in President Herbert Hoover’s Food Administration. In each of these roles she was responsible for applying the lessons of food preservation, nutrition and clothing conservation to the wartime shortages of food and other basic necessities. This work demonstrated the value of applying science to home and family life.

== Contributions to science and education ==
Bevier is less known for her scientific work than her teaching. However, Bevier was instrumental in applying the principles of chemistry to the study of food preparation and preservation. She reported findings about the chemical processes of bread making, was the first to use food thermometers to monitor the cooking of meat and she made contributions to our understanding of various means of food substitutes.

Bevier published two major books in her lifetime. The House, published in 1907 served as the basic introductory textbook for her original course at the University of Illinois. In addition to describing the design and construction of family homes, this book is a manifesto of Bevier’s views on the importance of applying science to the challenges faced by families and to the importance of educating women. She also wrote Home Economics in Education (1924) that described her ideas about home economics education.

== Legacy at the University of Illinois ==
The program in Household Science established by Bevier has undergone significant changes since its inception in 1900. The original areas of study within Household Science — including nutrition and food science, child and family development, and consumer economics — now exist as independent academic departments. Each field has developed into its own specialized scientific domain. Nevertheless, all of these departments were influenced by Bevier's foundational approach, which demonstrated that applying scientific research to women, children, and family issues could generate knowledge and practical applications aimed at improving human health and well-being. Contemporary research in food safety and nutrition, the study of human development, and the principles of family finance continue to reflect the framework that Bevier helped to establish.
