= Mumford (surname) =

Mumford is a surname. Notable people with it include:

- Alice Mumford (born 1965), artist
- Catherine Mumford (1829–1890), married name Catherine Booth, mother of The Salvation Army
- David Mumford (born 1937), British-American mathematician
- David Mumford (priest) (born 1947), Scottish priest, dean of Brechin
- Eloise Mumford (born 1986), American actress
- Enid Mumford (1924–2006), British computer scientist known for her work on sociotechnical systems
- Ethel Mumford (1878?–1940), American writer
- George Mumford (died 1818), American politician
- Herbert Windsor Mumford I (1871–1938), American professor of agriculture
- Jerri Mumford (1909–2002), Canadian servicewoman
- Kamesha Mumford, American politician
- Lawrence Quincy Mumford (1903–1982), Librarian of Congress
- Lewis Mumford (1895–1990), American historian of cities and sociologist of technology
- Mary Mumford, 15th Lady Herries of Terregles (1940–2017), daughter of the 16th Duke of Norfolk and a peeress in her own right
- Marcus Mumford (born 1987), English musician
- Mick Mumford, Australian military officer
- Quincy Mumford (born 1991), American singer-songwriter and guitarist
- Shane Mumford (born 1986), Australian footballer
- Stephen Mumford (born 1965), English philosopher
- Stephen Douglas Mumford (born 1942), American fertility and population growth expert
- Thad Mumford (1951–2018), American television writer and producer
- Thomas Mumford (1625–1692), progenitor of the Mumford family that left England and settled in Rhode Island
- William Bruce Mumford (died 1862), hanged for tearing down the US flag during the American Civil War

== Fictional ==
- Amazing Mumford, fictional character
