= Louise Freer Hall =

- Women's Gymnasium, University of Illinois Urbana-Champaign
- U.S. National Register of Historic Places
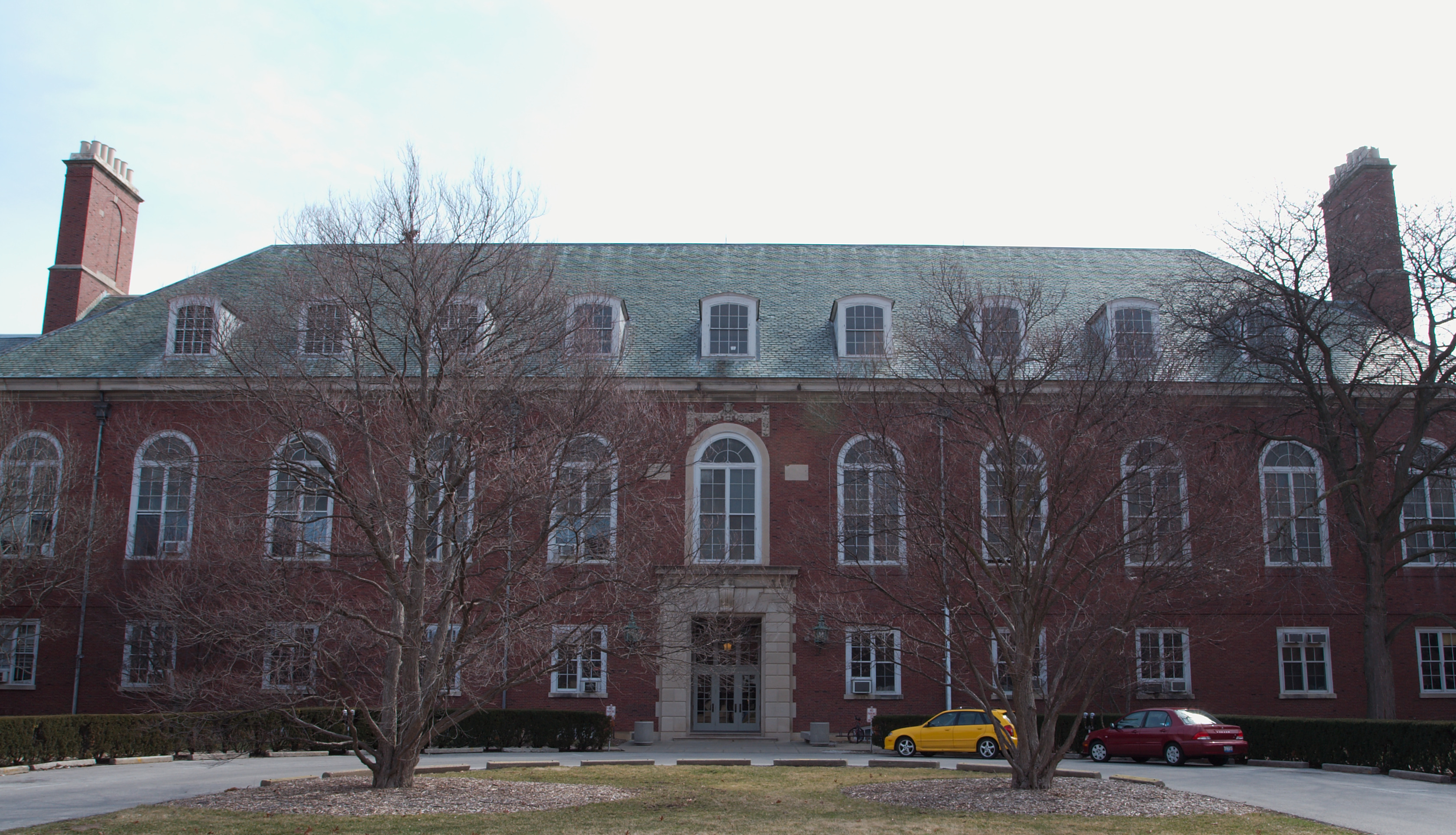

- Location within Illinois Location within the United States
- Location: 906 S Goodwin Ave., Urbana, Illinois
- Coordinates: 40°6′24″N 88°13′27″W
- Area: less than one acre
- Built: 1930
- Architect: Platt, Charles; White, James
- Architectural style: Georgian Revival
- MPS: University of Illinois Buildings designed by Charles A. Platt MPS
- NRHP reference No.: 02001751
- Added to NRHP: February 5, 2003

Louise Freer Hall, also known as the Women's Gymnasium, is a historic building on the campus of the University of Illinois Urbana-Champaign. Built in 1930, it was the last of the university's buildings designed by Charles A. Platt, who was responsible for the university's overall plan. Like most of Platt's designs for the university, the building has a Georgian Revival plan. The gymnasium originally provided expanded facilities for the women's physical education department, which had outgrown its space in the Woman's Building. The new gymnasium's facilities included two general-purpose spaces, several specialized facilities, and a physical education laboratory. Louise Freer, the women's physical education director for whom the building was later renamed, added a lounge area in 1932 to provide a social space in the building. The building is still used as a gymnasium and hosts intramural sporting events and physical education classes.

Freer Hall has served as the home venue for the Illinois Fighting Illini women's swimming and diving team.

The building was added to the National Register of Historic Places on February 5, 2003.
