= College of Fine and Applied Arts =

College of Fine and Applied Art(s) may refer to:

- College of Fine and Applied Art (Khartoum), a public art school in Sudan
- College of Fine and Applied Arts (University of Illinois Urbana-Champaign), an art school of the University of Illinois at Urbana-Champaign

== See also ==
- School of Fine Arts
