= College of Agricultural, Consumer and Environmental Sciences =

College of the University of Illinois at Urbana-Champaign

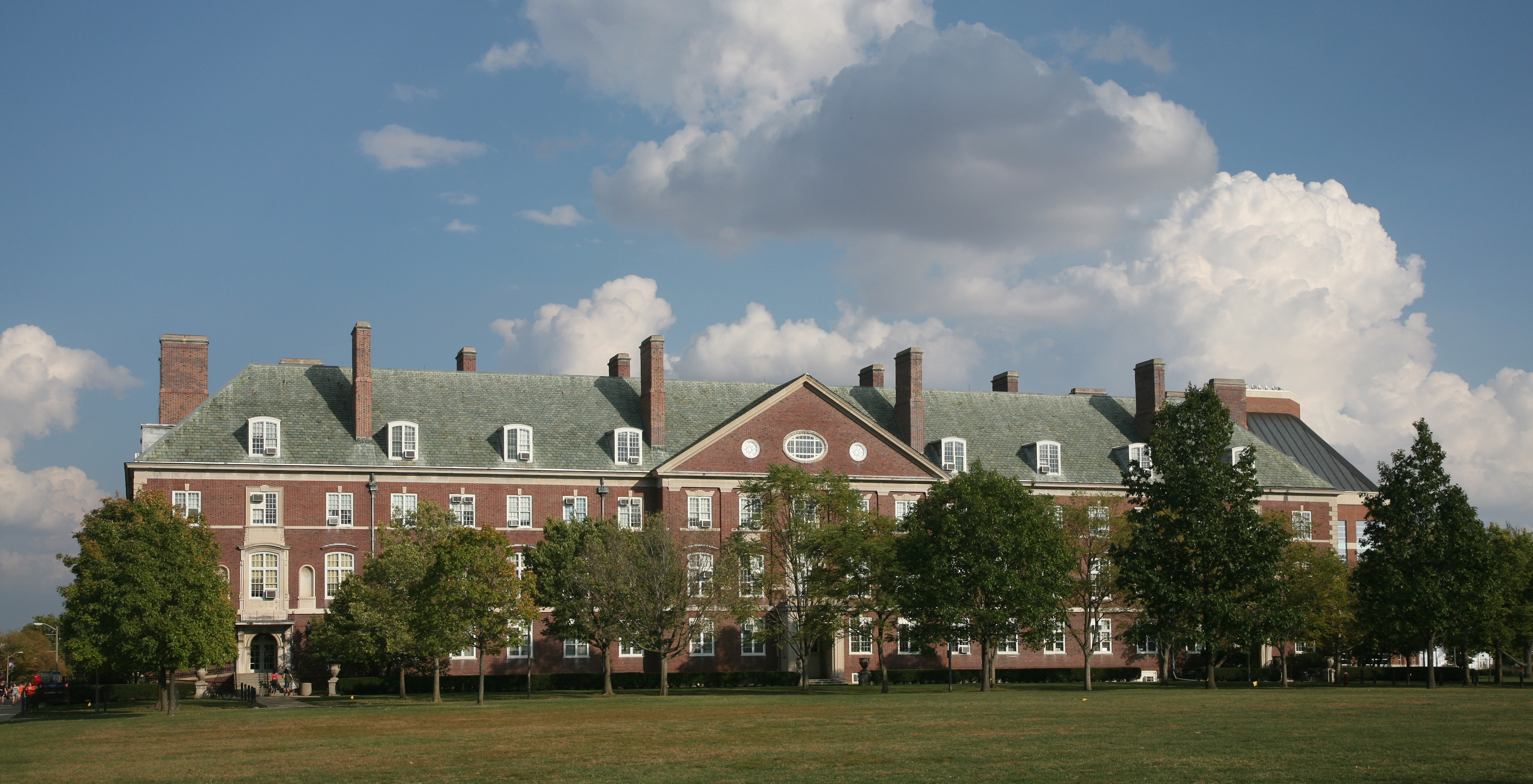
- Mumford Hall on the South Quad houses the Office of the Dean of ACES
- Type: Land-Grant, Public, State
- Established: 1867
- Parent institution: University of Illinois Urbana-Champaign
- Dean: Germán Bollero
- Academic staff: 260
- Administrative staff: 1,378
- Students: 3,470
- Undergraduates: 2,732
- Postgraduates: 738
- Location: Urbana, Illinois, U.S. 40.103647°N 88.226015°W
- Nickname: College of ACES
- Website: aces.illinois.edu

The College of Agricultural, Consumer and Environmental Sciences (ACES) is part of the University of Illinois Urbana-Champaign. Most of the ACES buildings are located on the South Quad. In terms of staff, ACES has 186 tenure-system faculty, 78 specialized faculty, 26 postdoctoral researchers, 493 academic professionals, 565 civil service staff, 323 assistants, and 956 hourly employees.

== Facilities ==
- ACES Library, Information and Alumni Center
- Turner Hall
- Animal Sciences Laboratory
- Edward R. Madigan Laboratory
- Agriculture Engineering Sciences Building
- Davenport Hall, named for Eugene Davenport, formerly known as the Agriculture Building and later the Old Agricultural Building
- Mumford Hall, named for Herbert Windsor Mumford I, formerly known as the New Agricultural Building
- Bevier Hall

== Departments ==
- Agricultural and Biological Engineering

The undergraduate Agricultural Engineering program at the University of Illinois Urbana-Champaign was ranked 1st and the undergraduate engineering program was ranked 5th in the 2008 America's Best Colleges edition of U.S. News & World Report (published in August 2007). The graduate engineering program at Illinois was ranked 5th in the 2007 Best Graduate Schools issue of U.S. News & World Report (published in March 2007). (College of Engineering) (ACES News)

- Agricultural and Consumer Economics
- Agricultural Education
- Animal Sciences
- Technical Systems Management
- Crop Sciences
- Food Science and Human Nutrition
- Human Development and Family Studies
- Natural Resources and Environmental Sciences
  - Agroecology/Sustainable Agriculture Program
- Division of Nutritional Sciences

== Deans ==
- Herbert Windsor Mumford I (1922–1938)
- John R. Campbell (1983–1988)
- W. R. (Reg) Gomes (1989–1995)
- David L. Chicoine (1996–2001)
- Robert A. Easter (2002–2009)
- Robert J. Hauser (2009–2016)
- Kimberlee K. Kidwell (2017–2021)
- Germán Bollero (2023–Present)
