= Herbert Windsor Mumford I =

Professor of agriculture at University of Illinois at Urbana-Champaign

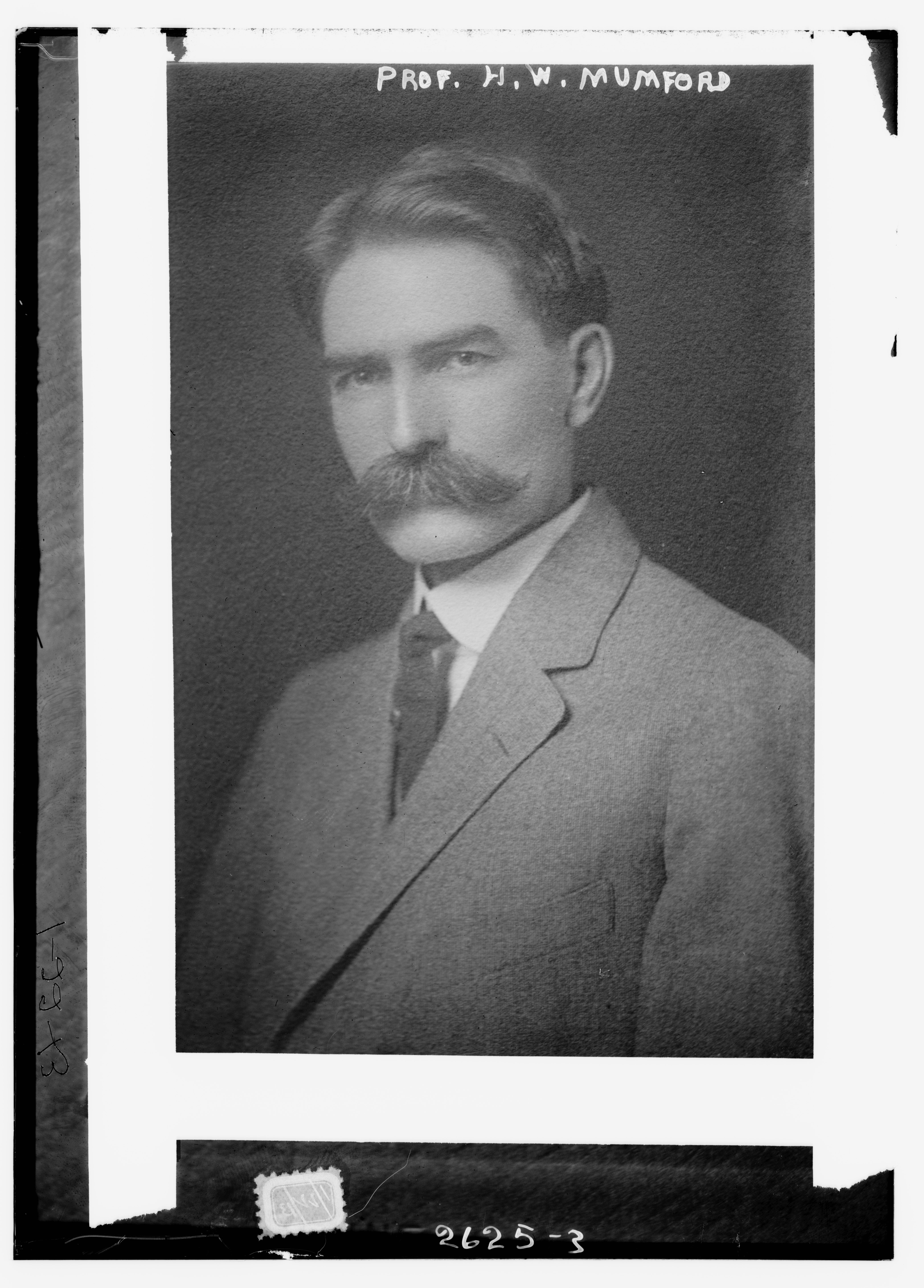
Herbert Windsor Mumford I circa 1913

Herbert Windsor Mumford I (1871-1938) was a professor of agriculture from 1901 to 1938 at the University of Illinois at Urbana–Champaign.

== Biography ==
He was born in 1871. He had a brother, Frederick Blackmar Mumford (1868-1946). He worked at the University of Illinois at Urbana–Champaign and was the department head for animal husbandry from 1901 to 1922. He was dean of the UIUC College of Agriculture and the director of the Agricultural Experiment Station and the cooperative extension service from 1922 till his death. He died in 1938.

== Legacy ==
On June 27, 1946 the Board of Trustees of the University of Illinois approved a resolution to rename the agricultural building Mumford Hall. The renaming took place on April 17, 1947.

In a neighboring state, the University of Missouri's Board of Curators honored Mumford's brother, F. B. Mumford, who served as Dean of that university's College of Agriculture, by renaming Mizzou's agriculture building Mumford Hall on March 18, 1930.
