= Eugene Davenport =

American academic and agriculturist (1856–1941)

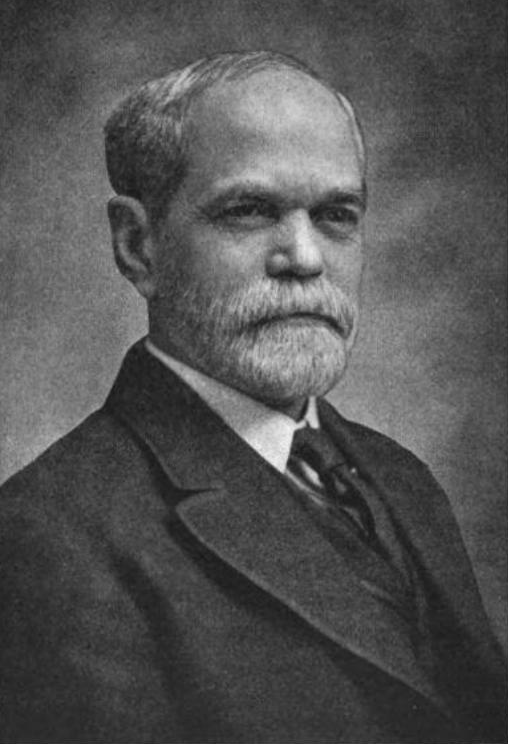
- Born: June 20, 1856; Barry County, Michigan
- Died: March 31, 1941 (aged 84); Woodland, Michigan
- Education: Michigan State Agricultural College
- Occupations: Academic, agriculturist
- Political party: Republican
- Spouse: Emma Jane Coats (m. 1881; died 1935)
- Children: 2

Eugene Davenport (June 20, 1856 – March 31, 1941) was an American academic and agriculturist from Michigan. Davenport studied at the undergraduate and graduate level at Michigan State Agricultural College. He taught at the school for two years, then briefly led an agricultural college in Brazil. When he returned to the U.S. he accepted he position as dean of the University of Illinois College of Agriculture. He is credited with greatly growing the institution in his 27 years and was named vice president of the university from 1920 to 1922. He retired and wrote a memoir on his farm until his death.

== Biography ==
Eugene Davenport was born on June 20, 1856, on a farm in Barry County, Michigan, near Woodland. He was the only child of George Martin and Esther (Sutton) Davenport. He attended both public and private schools. Davenport began teaching when he reached the age of eighteen. He attended the Michigan State Agricultural College, graduating in 1878. Davenport then returned to the family farm and taught at a nearby private school. He returned to college to obtain a Master of Science degree, graduating in 1884.

Davenport again returned to the college in 1888 study under William James Beal. He was named a professor of agriculture and superintendent of the college farm in 1889. He only held the position for two years before leaving to preside over an agricultural school in Piracicaba, Brazil. However, Davenport left in April 1892 to study at the Rothamsted Experimental Station in Harpenden, England. At some point he returned to the family farm near Woodland.

In the fall of 1894, Davenport agreed to become dean of the College of Agriculture at the University of Illinois. Arriving January 1, 1895, Davenport found that there were only nine students and that the school offered only a short course in the winter. Furthermore, the new president of the university, Andrew S. Draper, disliked the agricultural studies. Davenport was made professor of animal husbandry that March, Draper initially refused to allow Davenport to hire any fellow instructors. Davenport secured funds from outside sources to provide for faculty, and Draper finally relented to allow hiring in the summer of 1896 with Perry Greeley Holden and Wilber J. Fraser.

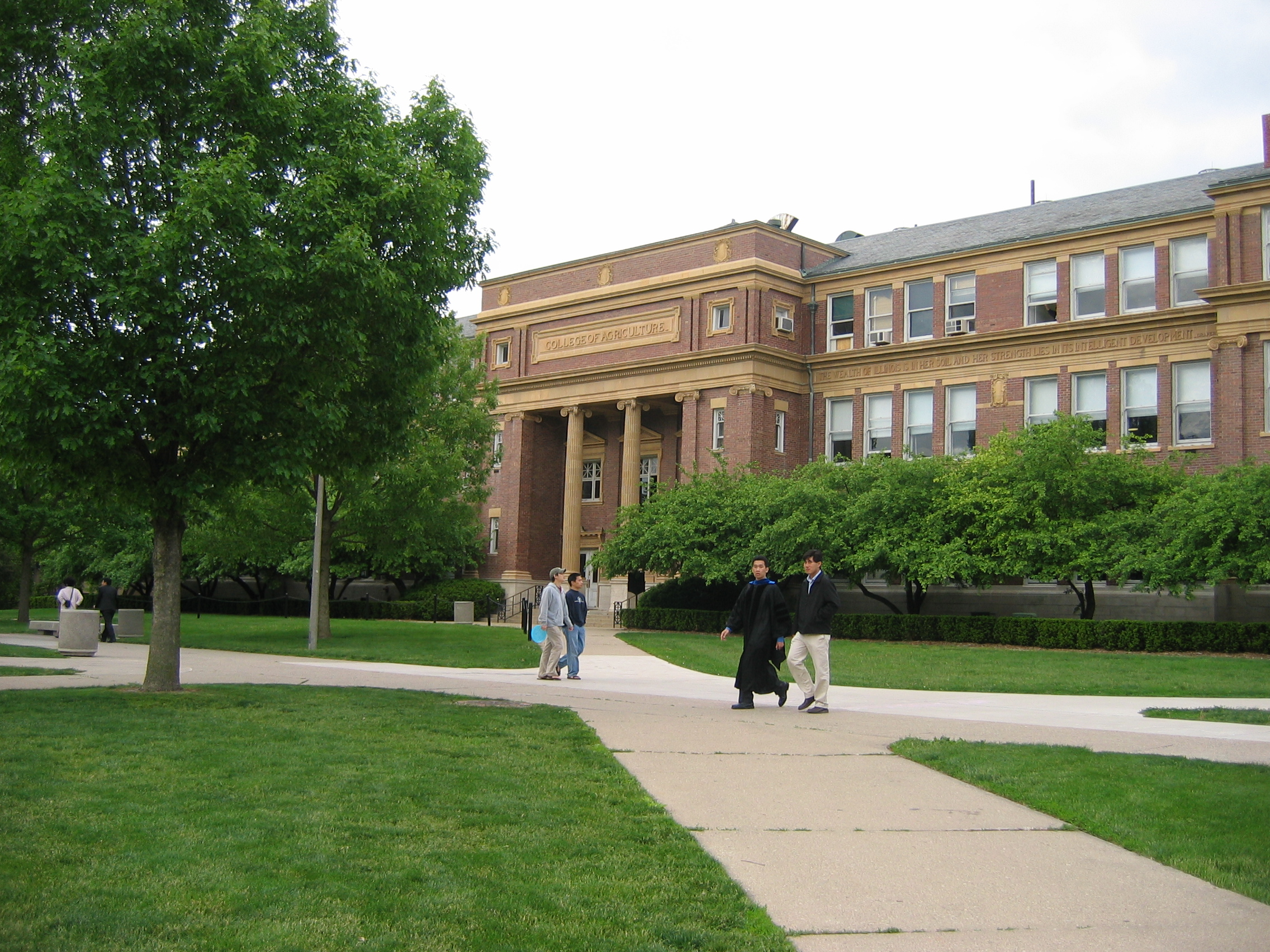
Davenport helped secure funds for the College of Agriculture Building. It is now known as Davenport Hall.

Davenport was appointed director of the Agricultural Experiment Station in 1896. He co-founded the Illinois Farmers' Institute, which he used to lobby the Illinois General Assembly for funds for the school. In 1899, the assembly approved a motion to appropriate money for the construction of an agricultural building. He published his first textbook, Principles of Breeding, in 1907. This was followed by Education for Efficiency in 1909, where he argued for teaching home economics and agriculture in public school. During World War I he was part of a committee advising the government on food policy.

The connections that Davenport made during the war helped to provide more funds and influence for the college. In 1920, Davenport was named vice president of the university, a position he held until his retirement two years later. He then returned to the family farm near Woodland. He wrote a memoir, Timberland Times, which was published posthumously in 1950. He was also working on an autobiography, but was unable to finish it.

Davenport married Emma Jane Coats on November 2, 1881. They had two daughters: Dorothy (died an infant) and Margaret. His surviving daughter died in 1930 and his wife followed in 1935. Politically, Davenport was a Republican and he staunchly supported prohibition of alcohol and tobacco. Davenport was the only member of the Michigan Convention to Ratify the 21st Amendment (repealing prohibition) to vote against it. He was raised in the Universalist church but later became a Congregationalist. Davenport died on his farm on March 31, 1941, following kidney disease. He was buried at Woodland Memorial Park. The College of Agriculture at the University of Illinois was renamed Davenport Hall in his honor.
