= Armory (disambiguation) =

An armory, or arsenal, is a military or civilian location for the storage of arms and ammunition.

Armory or armoury may also refer to:

== Places ==
- Armoury, Innsbruck
- Armoury (Siġġiewi)
- The Armory (Key West), Florida, listed on the NRHP in Florida
- The Armory (Portland, Oregon)
- The Armory (Durham, North Carolina)
- The Armory Show (art fair)
  - The 69th Regiment Armory, in New York City, site of the show
- The Armory (Janesville, Wisconsin), listed on the National Register of Historic Places in Rock County, Wisconsin
- The Armory (game company), a US distributor of tabletop games and supplies, now part of Alliance Distribution.
- The Citadel Armory, Charleston, South Carolina, currently known as McAlister Field House and home of The Citadel Bulldogs basketball, wrestling, and volleyball teams
- Fort Washington Avenue Armory, home of the Nike Track and Field Center in Washington Heights, New York
- Minneapolis Armory, in downtown Minneapolis, Minnesota, known locally as The Armory, and listed on the U.S. National Register of Historic Places in 1985
- Washington Avenue Armory, in Albany, New York
- The Armory (San Francisco), a historic building in the Mission District of San Francisco, California
- The Armoury (New Westminster), British Columbia, Canada
- The Armoury, Winchelsea, East Sussex, England
- National Guard Armory, in the United States, a meeting place for reserve units

== Other uses ==
- Armory (comics), a Marvel Comics character
- The Armory (game company), a miniature figure company
- Armoury Studios
- Armory, a synonym for heraldry, a discipline relating to the design and study of coats of arms; or a collection of coats of arms

== See also ==
- List of armories and arsenals in New York City and surrounding counties
- List of armouries in Canada
- Armory v Delamirie, English legal case
