= Rare Book and Manuscript Library =

Rare Book and Manuscript Library may refer to:

- Rare Book and Manuscript Library (Columbia University)
- Rare Book and Manuscript Library (University of Illinois Urbana-Champaign)
- Beinecke Rare Book and Manuscript Library, Yale University
