= Combat Paper Project =

Art project

The Combat Paper is a project formed to help veterans cope with experiences in the war. It was based out of the Green Door Studio in Burlington, Vermont, in the United States. Their processes include making paper out of their old uniforms to then create art on them as well as many other creative outlets for them to connect to fellow veterans. They have exhibits and workshops available to further expand their knowledge as well as connect on a more national level with others.

Combat Paper is a collaboration initiated by Drew Matott and Drew Cameron, involving war veterans, activists and artists.

Combat Paper is made using uniforms worn during military service. The uniforms are cut into pieces, cooked and macerated in a Hollander beater to make paper pulp. The pulp is then formed into paper sheets. Combat Paper has been used to make broadsides, books and personal journals, and the base for other printing processes.

In October 2009 utilizing a bike operated beater, Drew Matott, John LaFalce, Lee S. McDonald and Scott Meeker conducted a street intervention inviting attendees at the 2009 Friends of Dard Hunter Conference to cut pieces of military uniforms and place the pieces into the beater.

== List of sponsors, supporting institutions and special collections ==
- The Studios of Key West, Key West, FL
- Longwood University, Farmville, VA
- Magnolia Editions, Oakland, CA
- The Beat Museum, San Francisco, CA
- Napa Valley Hand Papermaking, Napa, CA
- University of California Santa Barbara, Santa Barbara, CA
- International Printing Museum, Carson, CA
- Tarbeaux Press, Sierra Madre, CA
- Cabbage Head Press, Tempe, AZ
- Herberger College of Fine Arts, Arizona State University, Tempe, AZ
- Fresno City College, Fresno, CA
- The Caxton Club, Chicago, IL
- Art Institute of Washington, Washington, DC
- St. Lawrence University, Canton, NY
- Seastone Papers, West Tisbury, Martha's Vineyard, MA
- Friends of Dard Hunter, Tuscaloosa, AL
- Rutgers University, New Brunswick, NJ
- Mills College, Oakland, CA
- San Francisco Public Library, San Francisco, CA
- Colorado Center for Handmade Paper, Colorado Springs, CO
- Colorado College, Colorado Springs, CO
- The Ottawa School of Art, Ottawa, Ontario, Canada
- National Alliance for the Mentally Ill
- Brooklyn Artists Alliance, Brooklyn, NY

=== Sponsors ===
- The Studios of Key West, Key West, FL
- St. Lawrence University, Canton, NY
- Columbia College, Chicago, IL
- Iraq Veterans Against the War
- Booklyn Artists Alliance, Brooklyn, NY
- Radio Bean, Burlington, VT
- Speeder & Earl's, Burlington, VT
- Art Rage Gallery, Syracuse, NY
- The Beat Museum, San Francisco, CA
- Sara Nesson Productions, Burlington, VT
- Friends of Dard Hunter, Tuscaloosa, AL
- National Alliance for the Mentally Ill
- Cabbage Head Press, Tempe, AZ
- Herberger College of Fine Arts, Arizona State University, Tempe, AZ
- Art Institute of Washington, Washington, DC
- Longwood University, Farmville, VA
- International Printing Museum, Carson, CA
- Tarbeaux Press, Sierra Madre, CA
- Seastone Papers, Martha's Vineyard, MA
- Saratoga Library, Saratoga, CA
- The Caxton Club, Chicago, IL
- Magnolia Editions, Oakland, CA
- University of California Santa Barbara, Santa Barbara, CA
- Napa Valley Hand Papermaking, Napa, CA
- Fresno City College, Fresno, CA
- Mills College, Oakland, CA
- San Francisco Public Library, San Francisco, CA
- Colorado Center for Handmade Paper, Colorado Springs, CO
- Colorado College, Colorado Springs, CO
- The Ottawa School of Art, Ottawa, Ontario, Canada
- Rutgers University, New Brunswick, NJ

=== List of Special Collections ===
- The Ames Library, Tate Archives & Special Collections, Illinois Wesleyan University
- Bailey/Howe Library, Special Collections, University of Vermont, Burlington, VT
- Bavarian State Library, Munich, Germany
- The Boston Athenæum, Special Collections, Boston, MA
- Carl Blegen Library, University of Cincinnati, Cincinnati, OH
- Hunter Library, Special Collections, Western Carolina University, Cullowhee, NC
- Lafayette College Libraries, Lafayette College, Easton, PA
- Library of Congress, Washington, DC
- Princeton University Library, Princeton, NJ
- Richard F. Brush Collection, St. Lawrence University, Canton, NY
- Scripps College, Special Collections, Claremont, CA
- Temple University, Special Collections, Philadelphia, PA
- University of California, Irvine, CA
- University of California Santa Barbara, Santa Barbara, CA
- University of California, Santa Cruz, Santa Cruz, CA
- University of Central Florida, Orlando, FL
- University of Connecticut, Special Collections, Storrs, CT
- The Rare Book & Manuscript Library, University of Illinois at Urbana-Champaign
- University of Minnesota, Minneapolis, MN
