= G.O.O.T.M.U. =

Board game

Box art, 1992

G.O.O.T.M.U. is a board game that was published by Jolly Games in 1992.

== Description ==
G.O.O.T.M.U. (Get Out of the Maze Unit) is a game for 2–6 players where players try to navigate around a maze of randomly laid tiles.

=== Components ===
The game comes with

- 32 4 in × 4 in (100 mm × 100 mm) isomorphic tiles, each printed with 16 squares
- 6 player pawns
- cardboard and wooden counters representing pieces of "Get Out of the Maze Units" (each one divided into three pieces), tools and encounters
- a six-sided die
- 4-page rulesheet

=== Setup ===
Each player chooses a different colour of pawn, and is given the matching three pieces of their own GOOTMU. From the pool of 32 board tiles, the first player draws a number of tiles randomly and creates a square or rectangular board with them. The number of tiles and the shape of the board are dependent on the number of players:

- 2 players: 3 x 3
- 3 players: 3 x 4
- 4 players: 4 x 4
- 5 players: 5 x 4
- 6 players: 5 x 5

The first player then places their pawn anywhere on the board. The second player places each of the three pieces of the first player's GOOTMU anywhere on the board, and then places their own pawn anywhere on the board. The third player places the second player's GOOTMU pieces on the board and then places their own pawn on the board, and so on, until the last player places their pawn on the board, and the first player places the last player's GOOTMU pieces on the board.

=== Objective ===
The only way to escape from the maze is to retrieve all three pieces of one's own GOOTMU unit.

=== Gameplay ===
The first player rolls the die, and must move that number of spaces on the board, obeying all written instructions on each space ("Move Back 3 Spaces" "Roll Less Than 3 to Move", "Lose 1 Turn", etc.) If the player rolls a "6", the player can choose to move 6 spaces as usual, or can rotate a tile one-quarter turn, either the tile the player's pawn is on, or an adjacent tile.

Play then passes to the next player.

=== Victory conditions ===
The first player to successfully recover all three pieces of their own GOOTMU is teleported out of the maze and wins the game.

== Publication history ==
G.O.O.T.M.U. was designed by Tom Jolly, and was published by Jolly's company, Jolly Games, in 1992. It is similar in some aspects to Jolly's well-received 1985 game, Wiz-War, another game where the board is created by randomly laying tiles.

== Reviews ==
In the December 1993 edition of Dragon (Issue #212), Allen Varney noted the similarities to Wiz-War, and called it an "equally unusual game of great maze escapes." However, Varney thought this game was "an interesting but uneven design," pointing out that "If one game happens to get a good group of tiles from the 32 provided, you’ll have lots of freewheeling fun. But you might just as easily get a frustrating maze full of dead ends and obstacles." He concluded with ambivalence, saying, "It's worth a try, but I recommend sticking with the terrific Wiz-War game."

Rick Heli reviewed the game for Spotlight on Games, and found it was too reliant on luck rather than skill, and found some spaces and rules too frustrating to make for a very enjoyable game.
