= University Library (University of Illinois Urbana-Champaign) =

Library system of the University of Illinois

Coordinates: 40.1047°N 88.2288°W

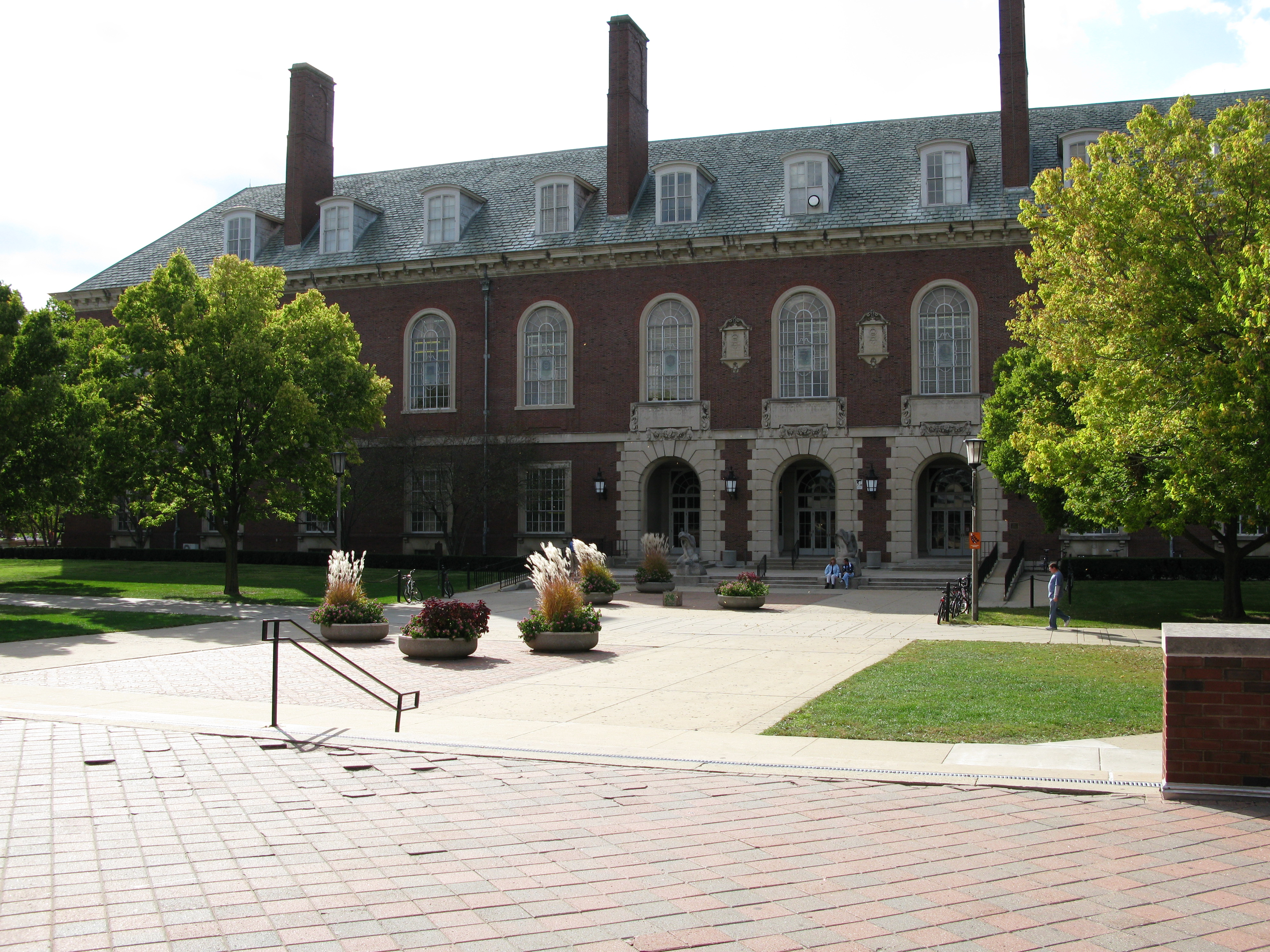
The Main Library building on the main campus of the University of Illinois.

The University Library is the library system of the University of Illinois Urbana-Champaign. It comprises a network of physical and digital libraries. It provides resources and services to the university's students, faculty, staff, and the broader community.

== History of the University Library ==
The University Library came into being before the university with which it is affiliated, as the university board considered it essential that students and faculty would have books waiting to greet them when the university opened its doors. However, this earliest collection was very small and did not yet have its own library building. As a result, the University Library has moved as it has grown throughout its history, a trend that continues to this day. While its collections had previously resided elsewhere, Altgeld Hall (known as Library Hall at the time) was the first building built specifically to house the university's library. Today, Altgeld Hall is home to the university's Math Department; the University Library moved in the 1920s to what is now called the Main Library.

=== Growing collections ===
The earliest Library collection consisted of around one thousand items. The collection remained small for some time, and in the early 1900s the Library was smaller than those of other large public libraries, as well as private institutions such as the University of Chicago. This would, however, quickly change. Between the mid-1930s and 1940, the library expanded its collection significantly. By certain metrics, such as the number of volumes, it was ranked as the fifth-largest academic library in the United States at that time. A strong library collection became increasingly important to the university's standing and to its retention of students, as well as to the implementation of a successful graduate school program at the university.

The Undergraduate Library (UGL) emerged in part from the surge in collections, deriving both from the influx of the shuttered University of Illinois at Galesburg's collection in 1949 and from the need to grant undergraduates free access to research materials. The Undergraduate Library building was constructed in 1969, built underground in order to maintain open spaces and leave unobstructed sun for the university's experimental cornfield. The Oak Street High Density Storage facility also grew out of the surge in collections. The facility, which opened in 2004, provides a "climate-controlled" environment for the integrity of the materials housed therein, and is kept around "50°Fahrenheit and 30% humidity."

=== University librarians ===
Early board members' concern for the University Library did not extend beyond purchasing books for student and faculty use: the Library lacked a librarian, and for more than twenty years, between 1873 and 1894, faculty members assumed the management of the small collection. Percy Bicknell, hired in 1894 as the first University Librarian, strove to bring the University Library into line with its counterparts throughout the country, beginning the University Library's tradition of Dewey cataloging as well as creating the Library's first card catalog.

Bicknell was let go in 1897, replaced by the progressive and reference-minded Katharine Sharp. Sharp, who took up the reins as the Library moved into Altgeld Hall, left a lasting mark both on the University Library and the university as a whole. Along with her work in the University Library, Sharp brought the Graduate School of Library and Information Science to the university. At the time, it was the only library science school in the Midwest, and one of only four in the nation.

University Librarians following Bicknell and Sharp have continued the Library's innovative traditions. They have also fought for patrons' right to privacy according to the American Library Association's code of ethics and its Library Bill of Rights. Paula Kaufman, University Librarian from 1999 to 2003, received several awards for her work protecting intellectual freedom and patron privacy, including the Robert B. Downs Intellectual Freedom Award and an award from the American Library Association's Office of Intellectual Freedom.

=== Online catalog ===
University librarians contributed to the development of online card catalogs, participating in the broader movement towards library automation. The University Library's first foray into automation of library services came in 1974, with the use of OCLC workstations for the cataloging of monographs at the library. In short order the technology was put to use cataloging serials, which was seen as a step on the way to the creation of a fully computerized, web-based card catalog. Hugh Atkinson, University Librarian from 1976 to 1986, made the enhancement and creation of automated catalogs and cataloging one of his and the Library's priorities during his tenure. Atkinson, who brought experience with library technology to the University Library, oversaw the implementation of MARC standards, or Machine-Readable Cataloging. Atkinson's dream of a fully automated library began to bear fruit in the late 1970s and early 1980s, as University Library patrons were for the first time able to request books on library computers.

Atkinson's 1986 death brought with it a shift towards other facets of library automation. In 1994, the Grainger Engineering Library Information Center introduced both public and staff PC workstations with internet connectivity, aligning with technological advancements of the time. For a time, Grainger's web servers ran the University Library's website. In the early 1990s librarians at the university, including current Grainger head librarian William Mischo, worked to give patrons access to full-text article searching and implemented an early federated search.

== Collections ==
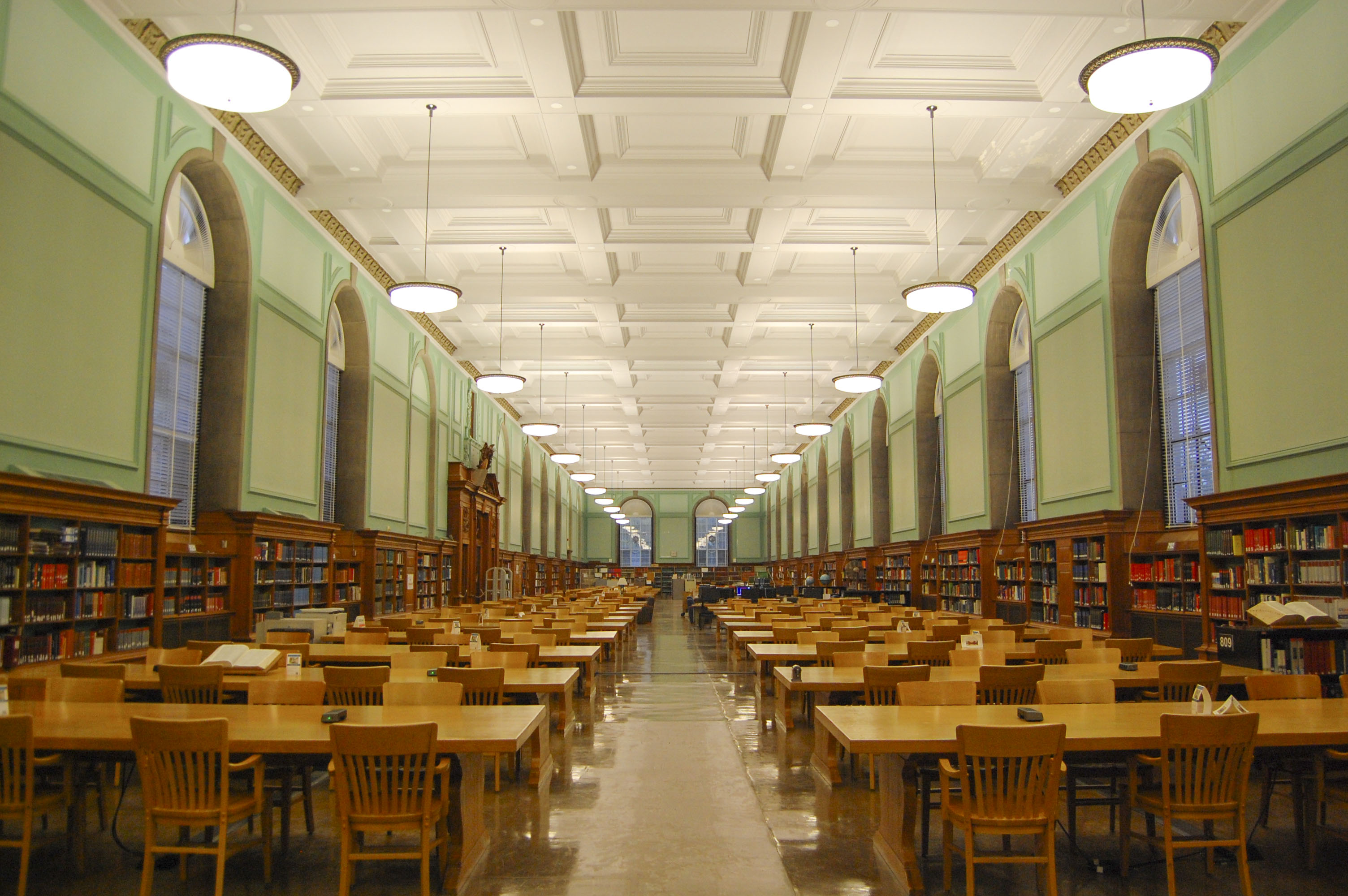
The Reference Reading Room

The University of Illinois Urbana-Champaign Library is one of the largest public academic libraries in the United States, "more than thirteen million volumes and 24 million items and materials in all formats, languages, and subjects, including 9 million microforms, 120,000 serials, 148,000 audio-recordings, over 930,000 audiovisual materials, over 280,000 electronic books, 12,000 films, and 650,000 maps." Beyond print books, the University Library's collections include DVDs, video games, and comic books. The University Library holds a significant collection of Indian comics, one of the largest of its kind in North America, featuring works in Hindi and other Indian languages. The Library also owns two copies of a brick from Abraham Lincoln's home, both by mason Harry C. Jorgensen (they are non-circulating but can be viewed at the library). Other items in the collection include e-books, microform, government documents, electronic and print academic and scientific journals, audio books, and loanable technology, including laptops, multimedia equipment, and graphing calculators.

The Library Office of Collections honors faculty who are newly tenured or promoted by allowing them to select a book for the Library collections. Bookplates in honor of the faculty or staff member are affixed to a chosen book, and the member's discussion of their choice is printed and made available to the general public on the Library's website.

All Library affiliates, including faculty, staff, and students, can recommend that an item be purchased for the Library collection at any time.

=== I-Share and Interlibrary loan ===
The University Library is part of the Consortium of Academic and Research Libraries in Illinois, or CARLI. CARLI manages the shared catalog I-Share with 138 members, or more than 94% of the academic libraries in the state. I-Share libraries are able to share books, DVDs, print journals, and other collections with each other. The University Library is the largest single library in the CARLI/I-SHARE system, and as such, its collections are the backbone of the wider I-SHARE collections.

Additionally, the Library participates in WorldCat. WorldCat, OCLC's international database linking library collections throughout the world, allows patrons at the University Library and beyond to access the materials they need for their research, whether from their own library or another.

=== IDEALS ===
The Illinois Digital Environment for Access to Learning and Scholarship, known as IDEALS, is the University of Illinois Urbana-Champaign's institutional repository. Since 2010, Master's theses and Ph.D. dissertations completed at the University of Illinois Urbana-Champaign have been deposited in IDEALS. Scholars may decide to whom, and how soon, their works should be available. They may choose to make their dissertations or theses available to the general public or restrict them to University of Illinois Urbana-Champaign affiliates. Additionally, they may choose to restrict their work entirely, ensuring that for a period of two years after graduation it will remain embargoed. In addition to dissertations and theses, IDEALS contains research by many of the scholars and departments at the University of Illinois Urbana-Champaign, much of which is freely available to the general public.

=== Special collections ===
The Rare Book & Manuscript Library (RBML) at Illinois acquired the Gwendolyn Brooks archives in 2014, reflecting its role in promoting literary studies and outreach activities. RBML also holds the Carl Sandburg archives, and in 2013 librarians with RBML discovered previously unknown poems among the poet's papers. Additionally, the Rare Books & Manuscript Library holds personal archives of French novelist Marcel Proust; English writers John Milton, H.G. Wells, and Anthony Trollope; English politician Benjamin Disraeli; and Olympian and former president of the International Olympic Committee, Avery Brundage.

The University Library's Illinois History and Lincoln Collection preserves and makes available a large collection of documents and publications pertaining both to the sixteenth president of the United States and to the history of the state of Illinois. Among other famed collections, the University Library contains strong Slavic and Eastern European collections, as well as strong collections in subjects as diverse as music, literature, history, maps, sciences, and serials. In this context, the term "serial" includes periodicals such as journals, magazines, and newspapers, as well as yearbooks.

The University Archives preserves and collects records, publications, correspondence, and personal papers from or about the University of Illinois Urbana-Champaign community. Items collected range from yearbooks, called "Illios," to fraternity documents to newspapers covering University sports, new initiatives, and even world wars. The Archives curates and organizes both physical and digital collections. The University of Illinois Archives is also the repository for the American Library Association's archives. It includes the Student Life and Culture Archives, which, since its foundation in 1989, has focused on preserving documents related to its titular student life and culture on the campus. The Sousa Archives and Center for American Music, in the Harding Band Building, holds many of American composer and bandleader John Philip Sousa's personal and professional archives. The Sousa Archives is also the home of Herbert L. Clarke's archives, as well as those of the late classical composer Salvatore Martirano, including manuscripts, scholarly work, letters and personal communication, and more. In addition to its more well-known collections, the Sousa Archives actively works to patronize and preserve regional performing arts through its Urbana-Champaign Local Music Preservation Initiative, a local music collection at the archive, and exhibits highlighting local music and musicians.

=== Digital collections ===
The University Library is involved with several digitization projects. The History, Philosophy, and Newspaper Library's Illinois Digital Newspaper Project, begun in 2005, has made digitized versions of nearly 50 different newspapers available online. The project is ongoing, and the University Library hopes to digitize considerably more of its large newspaper collection. Similarly, the university's famed emblem book collection has begun to be digitized, with many emblems now available for perusal on an open-access website hosted by the University Library.

The University Library is committed to increasing access to its public domain works, and as such is currently working with Google Books; the Committee on Institutional Cooperation and Google; and the Open Content Alliance and its partners HathiTrust, Internet Archive, and Illinois Harvest.

== Services ==
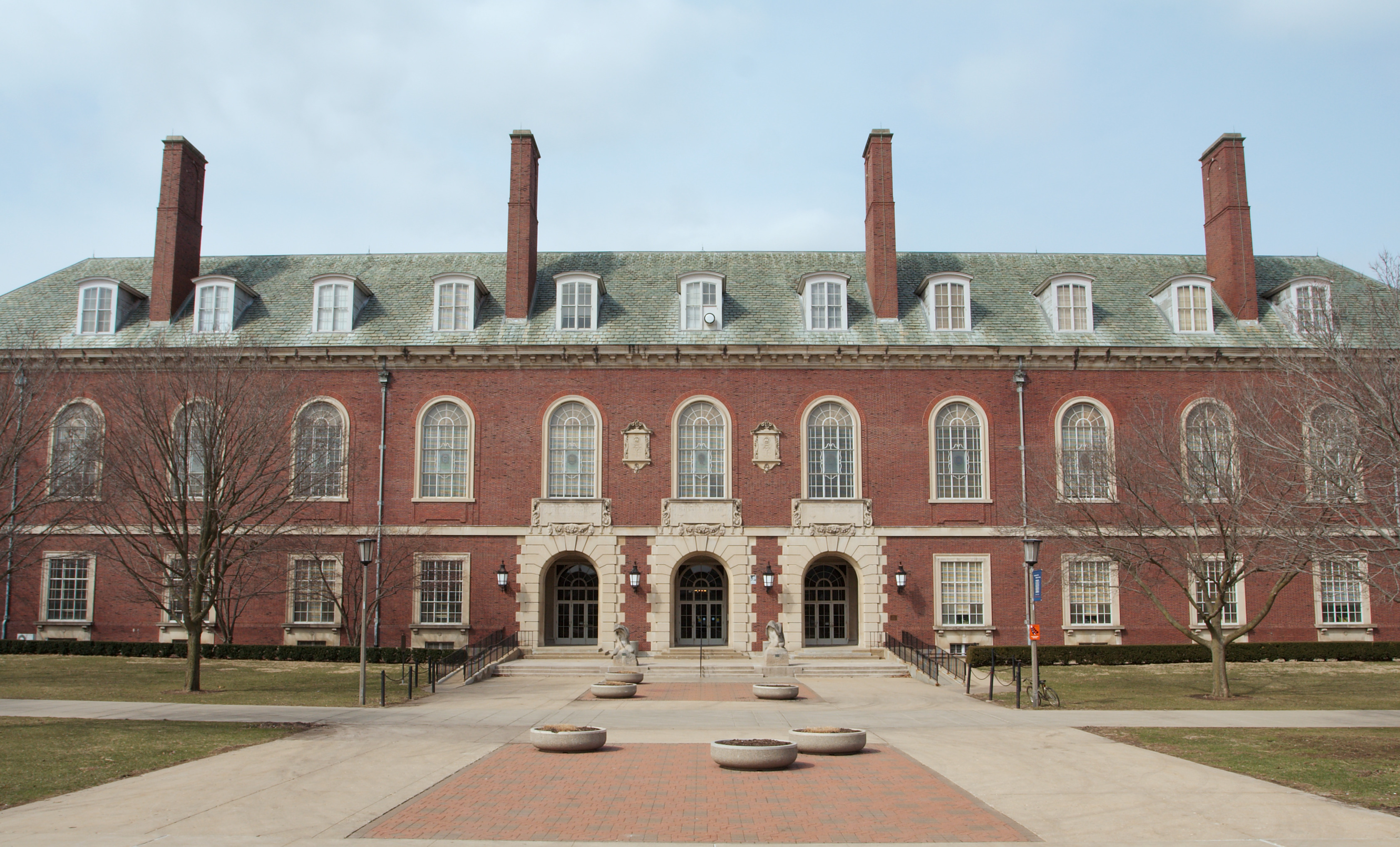
Main Library

The University of Illinois Urbana-Champaign Library offers a variety of services for its affiliates and community members.

=== Research assistance ===
The University Library serves researchers of all levels. They can assist with finding information and scholarship across disciplines through reference and instructional services.

==== Ask-A-Librarian ====
Ask-A-Librarian is the Library's instant messaging reference service. Illinois faculty, staff, and students can chat with a librarian for extended hours and get their questions answered from wherever they are. The service is often open the same hours as the information desk or for additional night and weekend hours after the information desk closes. Chat boxes are conveniently located on most Library webpages and vendor databases pages. Research assistance is also available via text messaging and phone.

==== Subject liaisons ====
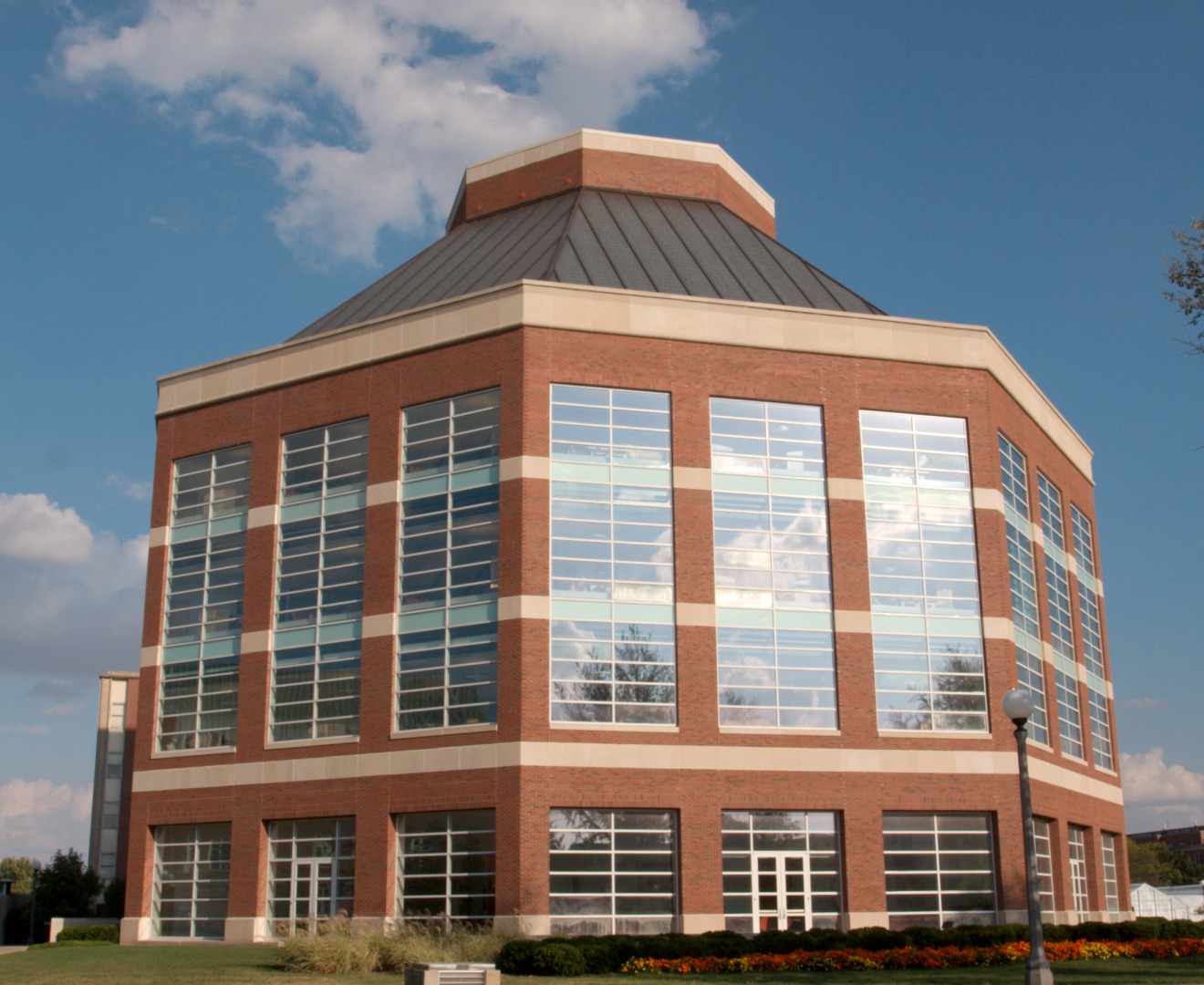
ACES Library

Subject librarians are available to provide expert assistance to all departments and colleges on campus. The department's subject librarian, who often has an additional degree or significant training in that department's subject area, is available to help affiliated faculty, staff, and students with library research. They also create webpages and other guides to help students taking courses in their subject area. Instructors can request that their subject librarian come to their class for a library instruction session.

=== Data assistance ===
Under White House and Office of Science and Technology Policy mandate, several grant funding agencies and organizations now require all applicants to submit a data management plan in order to receive funding. The University Library provides services to help researchers save, find, use, retrieve, analyze, and visualize their data.

==== Research data service ====
The Library's Research Data Service (RDS) is a partnership between the Office of the Vice Chancellor for Research, the Provost, the Library, GSLIS, CITES, and NCSA. RDS offers researchers information on data management plans (DMPs) for different agencies as well as tips and tricks for effectively organizing and sharing data with co-researchers. Illinois affiliates can set up consultations with a data specialist for more information.

==== Scholarly commons ====
Located on the third floor of the Main Library, the Scholarly Commons is a hub for digital and data-based research. The space includes software packages and hardware for data visualization, manipulation, and analysis, including ArcGIS, R, and Atlas.ti. In addition to tools, many experts staff the Scholarly Commons. These experts have experience and knowledge in digitization, metadata creation and schemas, copyright law, statistical analysis, database design, and digital humanities. All experts are available to provide consultation to Illinois affiliates needing assistance in their area. Additionally, Scholarly Commons staff manage IDEALS, the Library's university repository and host events on a variety of topics, including altmetrics and the non-academic job search.

==== Data management series ====
The University Library offers multiple workshop sessions on data management. These sessions cover file naming, metadata, sharing, storage and permanence. All workshops are supplemented with a guide on data management best practices.

=== Instructional services ===
The University Library offers numerous forms of instruction to its affiliates.

==== Subject librarian instruction ====
Because every academic unit on the University of Illinois Urbana-Champaign campus has an affiliated subject librarian, instructors from that area can request their subject librarian teach sessions on library searching, resource evaluation, data management, and information literacy. The Undergraduate Library also offers instructional sessions for Rhetoric, ESL, and Communication classes.

==== Savvy Researcher workshops ====
Savvy Researcher workshops are open to all Illinois affiliates. These 50-minute sessions cover a range of topics, all of which help affiliates do advanced research, searching, evaluation, and data analysis. Workshops help students, faculty, and staff navigate the full research life cycle, from the literature review to citation management. A sample of workshop titles include "The Literature Review Demystified," "Google for Scholars," "Finding Grants to Support Your Research," and "Improve Your Research Strategies".

==== Learn pages ====
The Library has specific pages devoted to learning how to use library resources. These web pages, entitled "learn", teach affiliates and community members about library resources, software, and information and citation management practices.

=== Tours and orientations ===
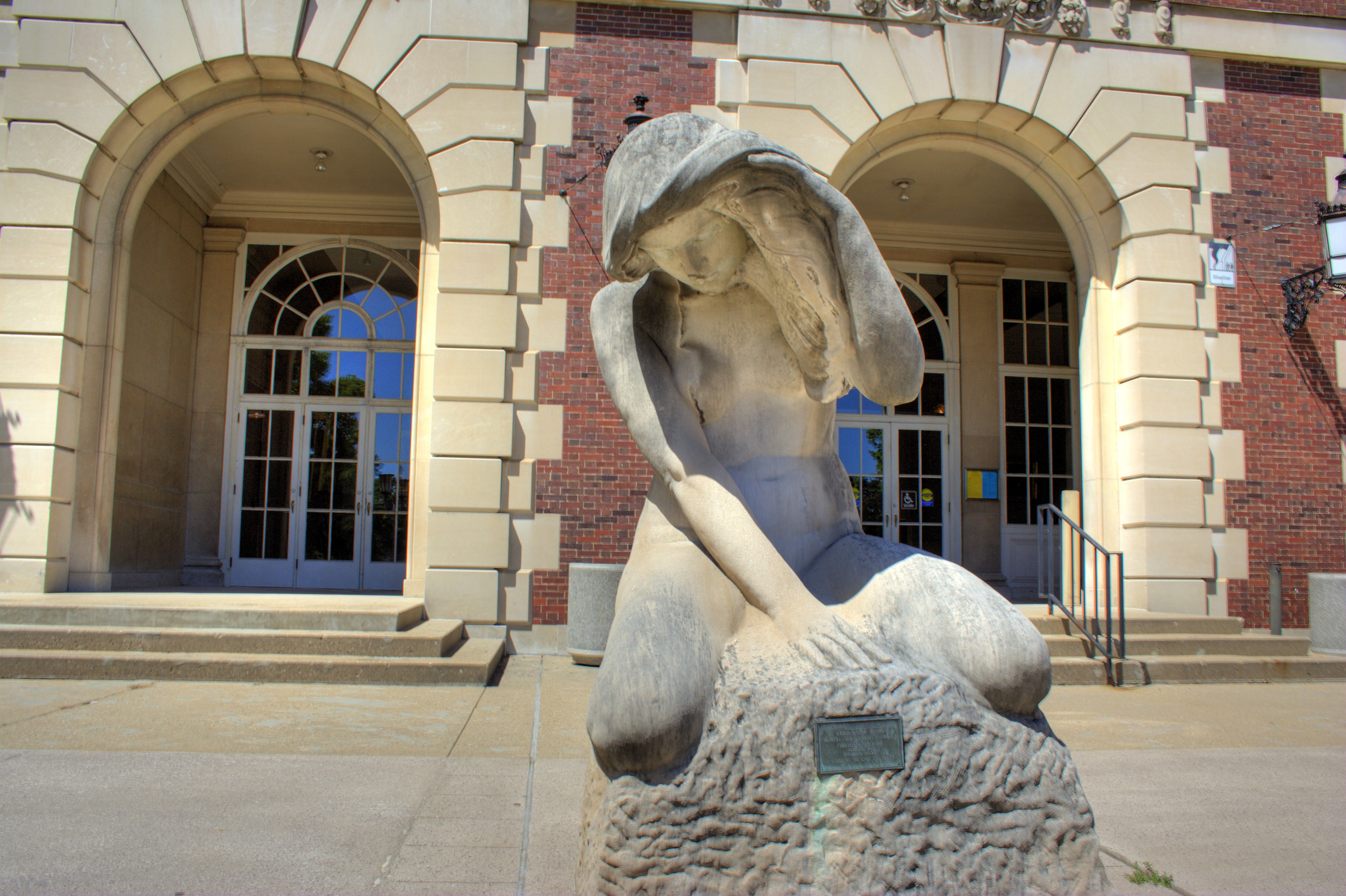
A statue from Loredo Taft's proposed Fountain of Creation, outside the Main Library

There are several options for those hoping to tour the Main Library space. Tours are offered at the beginning of every Fall and Spring semester. These are open to all affiliates, especially incoming students hoping to know more about library services.

Tours are also available for any Illinois group on request. Any Illinois affiliate can also contact the information desk to receive a personal tour of the Main Library space. The library offers virtual tours with extended explanations and pictures of each departmental library.

The Library also participates in many campus and departmental orientations. Any student can access Library orientation information from the Library's informational guide.

=== Outreach and events ===
The University Library often holds events on topics relating to Library collections, services, and patron interests. For example, the Rare Book & Manuscript Library often curates displays and holds events when they procure new collections. They also hold yearly events celebrating important anniversaries, including Shakespeare's birthday, publicized through their newsletter.

Other departmental libraries, including the International and Area Studies Library (IAS) and the University Archives regularly offers events open to the community. All Library events and announcements are announced on the calendar.

=== Courtesy borrowing card ===
Because Illinois is a public, land-grant institution, any resident of the state of Illinois with a photo ID can request a borrowing card. Proof of Illinois address is needed before a card can be issued. Courtesy borrowing cards are accepted at all departmental libraries within the Illinois system. They are valid for one year.

Courtesy cards do not make community members eligible for services like Interlibrary loan or I-Share borrowing services. Additionally, library staff can retrieve items from the Main Stacks for any community member; however, community members will not be granted access to the stacks.

Additionally, anyone with a library card from a library with CARLI membership can check out books from any Illinois departmental library. They will simply check the books out under their home institution's record. Likewise, anyone from a library within the Big Ten Academic Alliance (formerly Committee on Institutional Cooperation-CIC) can borrow materials from the university by using the library card issued to them from their home institution. Illinois' library has a borrowing agreement with both of these organizations.

== Libraries ==
The University Library consists of numerous departmental and special libraries, including both virtual and physical spaces.

=== Departmental libraries ===
- ACES (Funk) Library
- Architecture and Art (Ricker) Library
- Center for Children's Books
- Chemistry Library
- Classics Library
- Communications Library
- Engineering (Grainger) Library
- Health Sciences Library
- History, Philosophy, and Newspaper Library
- Illinois Fire Service Institute Library
- Illinois History and Lincoln Collections
- International and Area Studies Library
- Law Library
- Literatures and Languages Library
- Map Library
- Mathematics Library
- Music and Performing Arts Library
- Prairie Research Institute Library
- Rare Book and Manuscript Library
- Scholarly Commons
- Social Sciences, Health, and Education Library
- Sousa Archives & Ctr. For American Music
- Student Life and Culture Archives / Archives Research Center
- Undergraduate Library
- University Archives
- Veterinary Medicine Library

=== Virtual libraries ===
- Biology Virtual Library
- Business Information Services (BIS)
- Geology Virtual Library
- Government Information Services
- International Reference
- LIS Virtual Library
- Physics & Astronomy Virtual Library
