= Beer game =

Beer game may refer to:

- Drinking games, that is, games involving drinking beer or other alcoholic beverages
- Beer and pretzels game, a tabletop game
- Beer Distribution Game, a simulation game developed at MIT to demonstrate key principles of supply chain management
