= Targen's Tome: A Master's Guide to Magic =

Targen's Tome: A Master's Guide to Magic is a book about Magic: The Gathering published by Chessex.

== Contents ==
Targen's Tome: A Master's Guide to Magic is a guide for players, and includes information on deck design, outlining the nine basic deck types and the main cards that are used to build each one.

== Reception ==
Chris Lloyd reviewed Targen's Tome: A Master's Guide to Magic for Arcane magazine, rating it a 5 out of 10 overall. Lloyd comments that "Targen's Tome is an interesting and informative read for new Magic players, but the rest of us will be looking for more hard and fast advice on effective decks and card combinations than is offered here."

== Reviews ==
- Dragon #227
- Casus Belli
