= Tom Jolly =

American board game inventor (born 1954)

Tom Jolly (born April 8, 1954) is an American board game designer.

== Career ==
Tom Jolly's games include Wiz-War, Drakon, Cavetroll, Light Speed, Camelot, Cargo, and he co-designed DiskWars and Vortex/Maelstrom. Additional games he has designed include Gootmu, Knots, WayWord, and Got It!. The publisher of Wiz-War, Chessex, printed the fourth through the 7th editions of Wiz-War.The seventh edition, came out in 1997. The eighth edition was released by publisher Fantasy Flight Games in 2012. The first expansion set, Malefic Curses, came out in January 2014. The ninth edition will be released by Steve Jackson Games.

Fantasy Flight Games published Jolly's DiskWars game in 1998, and a later fusion of the game was made with Alderac Entertainment Group's Rokugan setting resulting in DiskWars: Legend of the Five Rings (2000), and another mashup with Pinnacle Entertainment Group's Deadlands which resulted in Doom Town Range Wars (2000). In January 2014, Diskwars was yet again revived in the form of Warhammer:Diskwars, combining Diskwars mechanics with the Warhammer fantasy world.

Tom Jolly has also written several short Science Fiction and Fantasy stories published by a variety of on-line and paper magazines. He has also designed over 40 puzzles, produced by a number of companies and woodcrafters around the world.

Jolly lives in California with his wife, having retired from his career as an electrical engineer.
