= Flora Belle Ludington =

American librarian and author

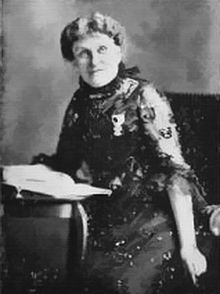

President of the American Library Association
- In office 1953–1954
- Preceded by: Robert Bingham Downs
- Succeeded by: L. Quincy Mumford

Personal details
- Born: November 12, 1898; Huron County, Michigan, US
- Died: March 1967; Holyoke, Massachusetts, US
- Education: Mills College
- Occupation: Librarian; author

Flora Belle Ludington (November 12, 1898 – March 1967) was an American librarian and author. Ludington served as the head librarian for Mount Holyoke College in South Hadley, Massachusetts, from 1938 until 1964.

== Life ==
Born in Huron County, Michigan, Ludington moved to Wenatchee, Washington, as a young girl. At fourteen, she began her library career as a volunteer in the Carnegie public library in Wanatchee. She worked as an assistant in the University of Washington library, where she received a bachelor's degree in librarianship in 1920. She left Washington to be a reference librarian at Mills College, where she went on to study and receive a master's degree in history fin 1925. That same year, she received a second bachelor's degree from the New York State Library School. Ludington worked at Mills College as an assistant professor of bibliography and then associate librarian. In 1936 she left to become the librarian at Mount Holyoke College, where she worked until she retired in June 1964.

A long-time member of the American Library Association, Ludington was chairman of the board on International Relations (1942–1944), where she worked on postwar rehabilitation of European libraries and the development of cooperative programs with libraries in Latin America. As president of the American Library Association from 1953 to 1954, she worked to establish the National Book Committee to "promote wider and wiser distribution of books and to preserve the freedom to read." In 1957 she received the ALA's Joseph W. Lippincott Award for "high achievement."

== Publications ==
- Books and libraries; tools of the academic world (American Library Association, 1958)
- The Newspapers of Oregon, 1846–1870 in the Oregon Historical Quarterly, 1925.

Non-profit organization positions
Preceded by Robert Bingham Downs	President of the American Library Association; 1953–1954	Succeeded by L. Quincy Mumford
