= Robert B. Downs =

Author and librarian

- Downs c. 1940

President of the American Library Association
- In office 1952–1953
- Preceded by: Loleta Fyan
- Succeeded by: Flora Belle Ludington

Personal details
- Born: Robert Bingham Downs; May 25, 1903 Lenoir, North Carolina, US
- Died: February 24, 1991 (aged 87) Urbana, Illinois, US
- Spouses: Elizabeth Crooks (m. 1929; died 1982); Jane Wilson (m. 1983)
- Education: North Carolina; Columbia University
- Occupation: Librarian

Robert Bingham Downs (May 25, 1903 – February 24, 1991) was an American writer and librarian. Downs was an advocate for intellectual freedom, and spent the majority of his career working against literary censorship. Downs authored many books and publications regarding the topics of censorship, and on the topics of responsible and efficient leadership in the library context.

== Life ==
Robert Downs was born May 25, 1903, Lenoir, North Carolina, United States. He was the seventh child of eight of Mr. John McLeod, an educator and local part-time politico, and Clarissa Catherine Hartley Downs. Downs married Elizabeth Crooks in 1929 and they had two daughters. In 1982, Elizabeth Downs died and Downs remarried Jane Wilson in 1983. Downs had three grandchildren and five great-grandchildren. Robert B. Downs died at the age of 87 of pneumonia in 1991 in Urbana, Illinois.

== Educational background ==
Downs attended a one-room schoolhouse called Shady Grove until his high school years when his family relocated to Asheville, North Carolina. After high school Downs attended the University of North Carolina at Chapel Hill (A.B. 1926), and the Columbia University School of Library Service (B.S. 1927, M.S. 1929). During his Masters coursework, Downs was employed at the New York Library and later as a librarian for two years (1929 to 1931) at Colby College in Maine.

== Employment ==
The following "Employment" section uses data procured from the source: Contemporary Authors Online, Gale, 2008.

- 1922–1926: Assistant Librarian, University of North Carolina
- 1927–1929: Librarian, Colby College
- 1929–1931: Assistant Librarian, New York Public Library
- 1931–1932: Assistant Librarian, University of North Carolina
- 1932–1934: Librarian and associate professor of Library Science, University of North Carolina
- 1934–1938: Librarian and professor, University of North Carolina
- 1938–1943: Director of Library and Library Sch. – Director of Libraries, New York University
- 1943–1958: Professor of Library Science, University of Illinois
- 1958–1971: Dean Library Administration, University of Illinois
- 1971: Dean Emeritus, University of Illinois
- 1973: Visiting professor at University of Toronto
- 1975: University of North Carolina
- In addition, Downs served as an adviser to many overseas libraries.

== Professional/academic memberships ==
The following "Professional/academic" section uses data procured from the source: Contemporary Authors Online, Gale, 2008.

- 1951–1952: Vice President, American Library Association
- 1952–1953: President, American Library Association
- 1955–1956: President, Illinois Library Association

In addition, Downs was a member of:

- Southeastern Library Association
- American Association of University Professors
- Authors League America
- Caxton Club
- Society of Midland Authors
- Committee on Books Abroad
- United States Information Agency
- Phi Beta Kappa
- Beta Phi Mu
- Phi Kappa Phi

== Endeavors ==
While Downs looked to heroes Abraham Lincoln and Thomas Jefferson for guidance when challenges were encumbered, it was the influences of his distant cousin, Mr. Louis Round Wilson, that formed Downs' librarian leadership foundation. During his tenure as President of the American Library Association, Downs became a strong force against what he viewed as suppressive forces of literature. Downs produced many publications during his life and is best known for his book titled Books That Changed the World. This publication enjoyed a great deal of success and was subsequently translated into many languages., Downs was also known for his accession talents and developed a proclivity for rare books regarding the topic of American folklore. Aided by Mr. Gordon N. Ray, Downs' talents would eventually facilitate realization of the private papers of noted authors H. G. Wells and Carl Sandburg. These collections are currently part of The Rare Book & Manuscript Library at the University of Illinois at Urbana-Champaign.

== Honors ==
- Joseph W. Lippincott Award for distinguished service to the profession of librarianship. 1964.
- Robert B. Downs Intellectual Freedom Award established in 1969 to celebrate Downs' 25th year as director of the School of Information Sciences at the University of Illinois.
- Melvil Dewey Medal. 1974
- American Library Association Honorary Membership. 1976.

== Works ==
The following "Works" section is a direct reflection of data from the source: Contemporary Authors Online, Gale, 2008.

- (With Louis R. Wilson) Report of a Survey of the Libraries of Cornell University, Cornell University Press, 1948.
- Books That Changed the World, New American Library, 1956, 2nd edition, American Library Association, 1978.
- (With others) Family Saga and Other Phases of American Folklore, University of Illinois Press, 1958.
- Molders of the Modern Mind: 111 Books That Shaped Western Civilization, Barnes & Noble, 1961.
- Strengthening and Improving Library Resources for Southern Higher Education, Southern Regional Education Board, 1962.
- The Kabul University Library, University of Wyoming Education Program, 1963.
- (Editor) The Bear Went over the Mountain, Macmillan, 1964.
- Famous Books, Ancient and Medieval, Barnes & Noble, 1964.
- Resources of North Carolina Libraries, Governor's Commission on Library Resources, 1965.
- How to Do Library Research, University of Illinois Press, 1966, 2nd edition, 1975.
- Resources of Missouri Libraries, Missouri State Library, 1966.
- (With Frances B. Jenkins) Bibliography: Current State and Future Trends, University of Illinois Press, 1967.
- Resources of Canadian Academic and Research Libraries, Association of Universities of Canada, 1967.
- University Library Statistics, Association of Research Libraries, 1968.
- Books That Changed America, Macmillan, 1970.
- Famous American Books, McGraw, 1971.
- Books and History, University of Illinois Library School, 1974.
- Horace Mann, Twayne, 1974.
- Heinrich Pestalozzi, Twayne, 1975.
- Famous Books, Littlefield, 1975.
- Books That Changed the South, University of North Carolina Press, 1977.
- Henry Barnard, Twayne, 1977.
- Friedrich Froebel, Twayne, 1978.
- Australian and New Zealand Library Resources, Mansell, 1979.
- British and Irish Resources, Mansell, 1981.
- Landmarks in Science, Libraries Unlimited, 1982.
- (With others) Memorable Americans, Libraries Unlimited, 1983.
- Perspectives on the Past, an Autobiography, Scarecrow, 1984.
- (With John T. Flanagan and Harold W. Scott) More Memorable Americans, Libraries Unlimited, 1985.
- Books in My Life, Library of Congress (Washington, DC), 1985.
- (Compiler) Images of America: Travelers from Abroad in the New World, University of Illinois Press, 1987.
- Scientific Enigmas, Libraries Unlimited, 1987.
- A Dictionary of Eminent Librarians, High Plains Publishing (Worland, WY), 1990.
- (With Jane B. Downs) Journalists of the United States: Biographical Sketches of Print and Broadcast News Shapers from the Late seventeenth Century to the Present, McFarland (Jefferson, NC), 1991.

Non-profit organization positions
| Preceded by Loleta Fyan | President of the American Library Association; 1952–1953 | Succeeded by Flora Belle Ludington |
