= Main Library (University of Illinois Urbana-Champaign) =

- U.S. National Register of Historic Places
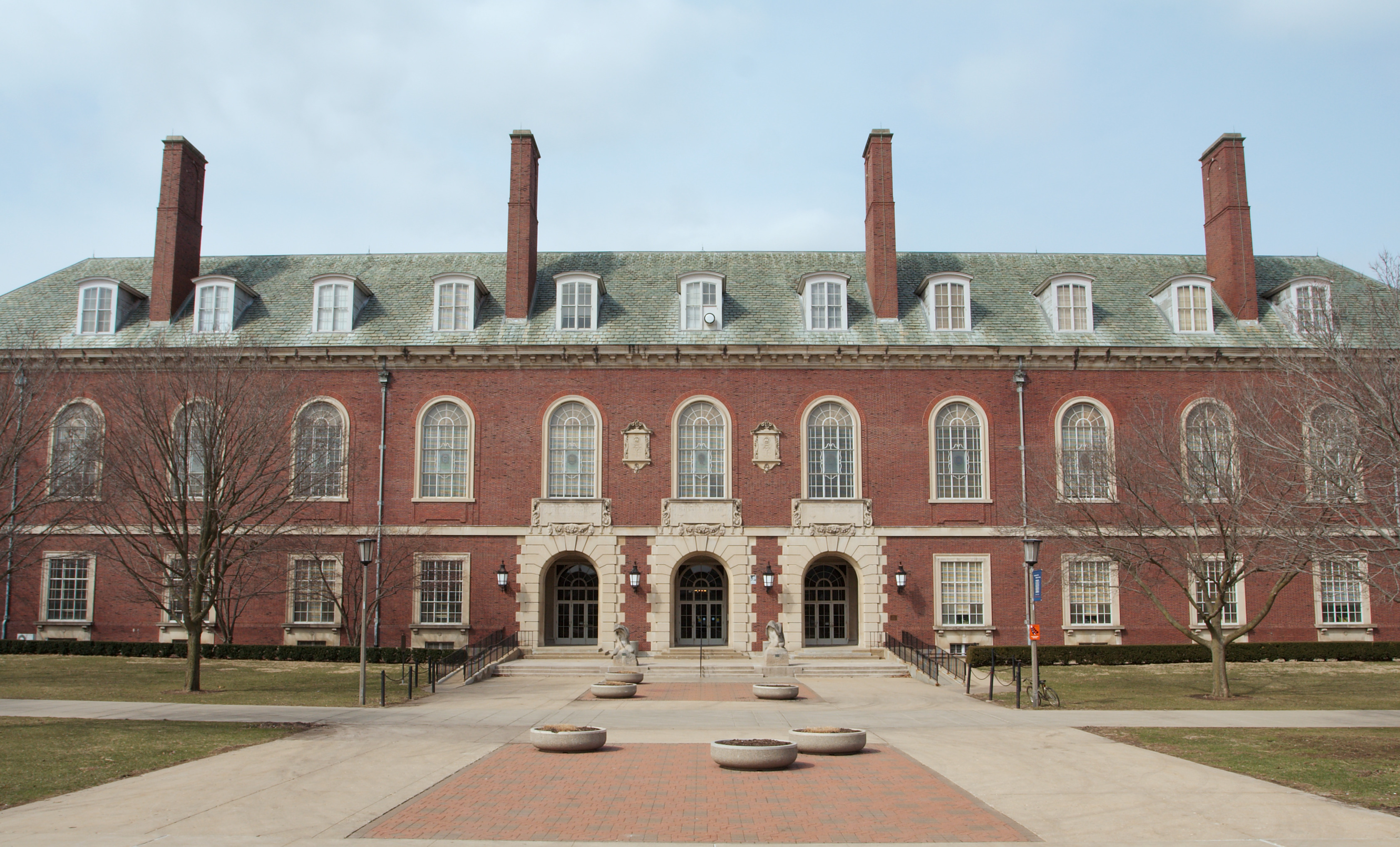

- Location within Illinois Location within the United States
- Location: 1408 West Gregory Drive, Urbana, Illinois
- Coordinates: 40°6′18″N 88°13′43″W
- Area: 4 acres (1.6 ha)
- Built: 1924-1929
- Architect: Platt, Charles Adams
- Architectural style: Georgian Revival
- MPS: University of Illinois Buildings designed by Charles A. Platt MPS
- NRHP reference No.: 00000413
- Added to NRHP: August 11, 2000

The Main Library is a historic building on the campus of the University of Illinois Urbana-Champaign in Urbana, Illinois. Built in 1924, the library building was the third built for the school; it replaced Altgeld Hall, which had become too small for the university's collections. Architect Charles A. Platt designed the Georgian Revival building, one of several on the campus which he designed in the style. The building houses several area libraries, as well as the University Archives and the Rare Book and Manuscript Library. The Main Library is the symbolic face of the University Library.

The library was added to the National Register of Historic Places on August 11, 2000.

== History ==
In 1868, the University of Illinois's first president, John Milton Gregory, personally acquired 644 volumes to establish the library. By 1880, the library housed 12,500 volumes, and by the turn of the century, the collection had grown to 70,000 volumes. The library moved from its previous space in University Hall to the newly-completely completed Library Hall (later renamed Altgeld Hall) in 1897. However, the new building quickly became inadequate for the needs of the quickly-growing student population. In 1912, university president Edmund J. James announced an ambitious plan to expand the collection to one million volumes and to build a new library building. James envisioned a library to rival those at "the great German academic institutions."

By 1909, the university was already considering expanding the campus to the area south of the Main Quad. A plan drawn in 1919 by university professor James M. White imagined a new southern quad anchored by a new library on its western edge. During the economic prosperity that Illinois experienced in the Roaring Twenties, the state legislature committed to funding a major building campaign at the university. In 1923, the University of Illinois hired landscape architect Charles A. Platt to revise the master plan and design new construction. Platt's plan for the campus adopted the Georgian Revival architectural style, which was popular at the time.

Construction on the Main Library began in 1924. The site was previously occupied by tennis courts and the Women's Field. The library was built in three phases. Upon its completion in 1929, the building had a "figure 8" shape with two enclosed courtyards. A bookstack wing abutted the library on its west side.

The library was purposely built away from the center of campus, a break from traditional campus planning, to allow the building to expand. This proved necessary; the library's holdings grew from 649,924 volumes in 1926 to one million volumes in 1935. To accommodate the library's ever-expanding collection, four further additions were added to the bookstack wing between 1939 and 1984. The library's north facade was extended westward in 1962–1964 in the same style as the original construction. To accommodate air conditioning equipment, a basement extension was added to the library's southwest corner in 1966–1968.

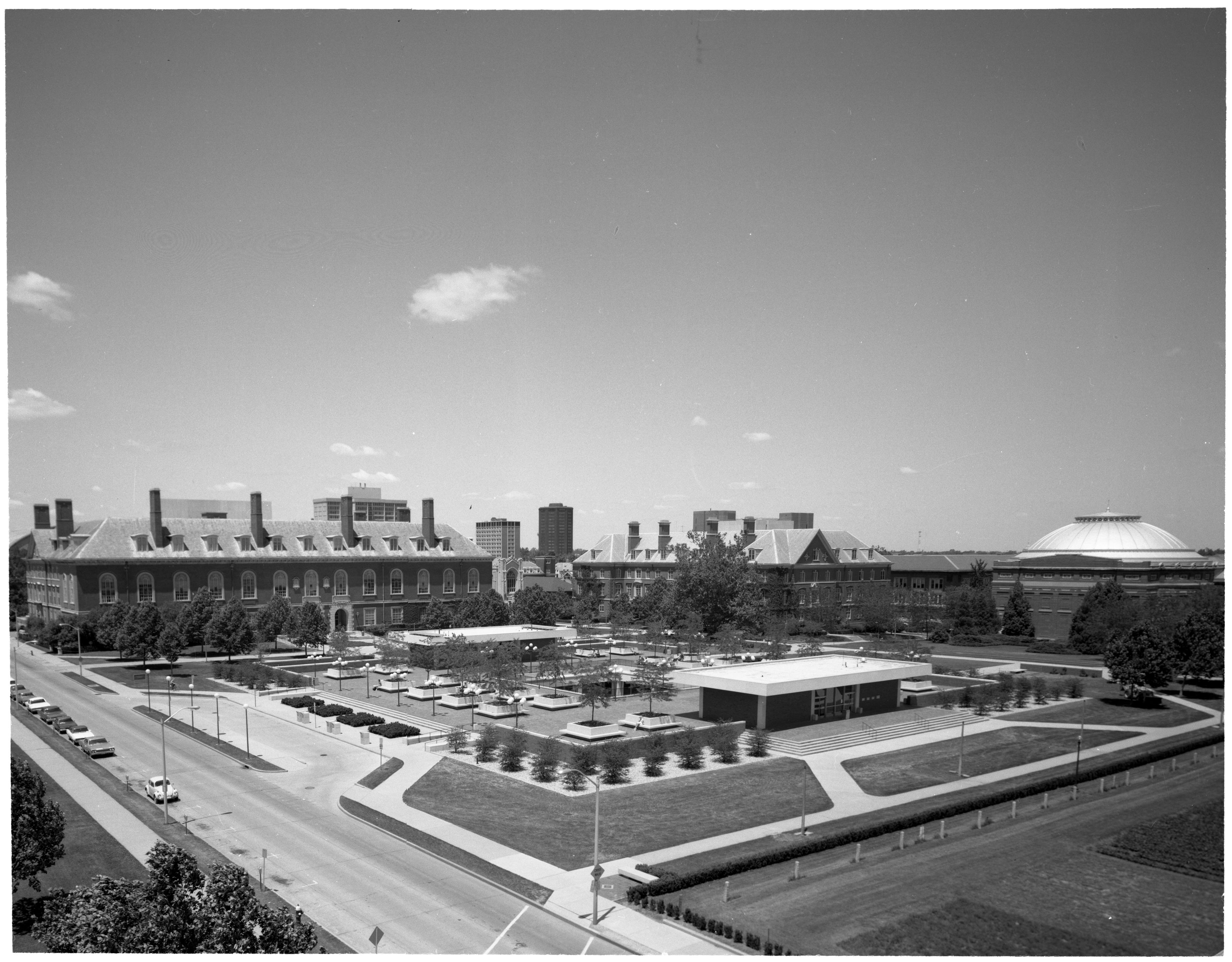
Main Library and Undergraduate Library, 1980

To help accommodate an influx in enrollment following World War II, the University of Illinois opened a satellite campus in Galesburg. When the campus closed, its library's 25,000 volumes became the core collection of a new Undergraduate Library at the Urbana-Champaign campus. Originally housed in rooms 123 and 101 in the Main Library, the facility outgrew its space by 1963. A new, separate building for the Undergraduate Library was completed 1969. Located underground between the Main Library and the Morrow Plots, it is connected to the Main Library via a 170-foot-long (52 m) tunnel.

In 2019, the university announced plans to modify the Main Library by demolishing five of the six bookstack additions on the west side of the building, which will be rebuilt with five stories. The new addition will accommodate interdisciplinary learning spaces, and compact shelving in the new basement will help compensate for the book storage lost by demolishing the stacks. As part of the project, undergraduate services will move to the Main Library from the Undergraduate Library, which the university will remodel to house the library's archives and special collections. Library administration expects construction to begin in 2022 and end in 2026.

== Architecture ==
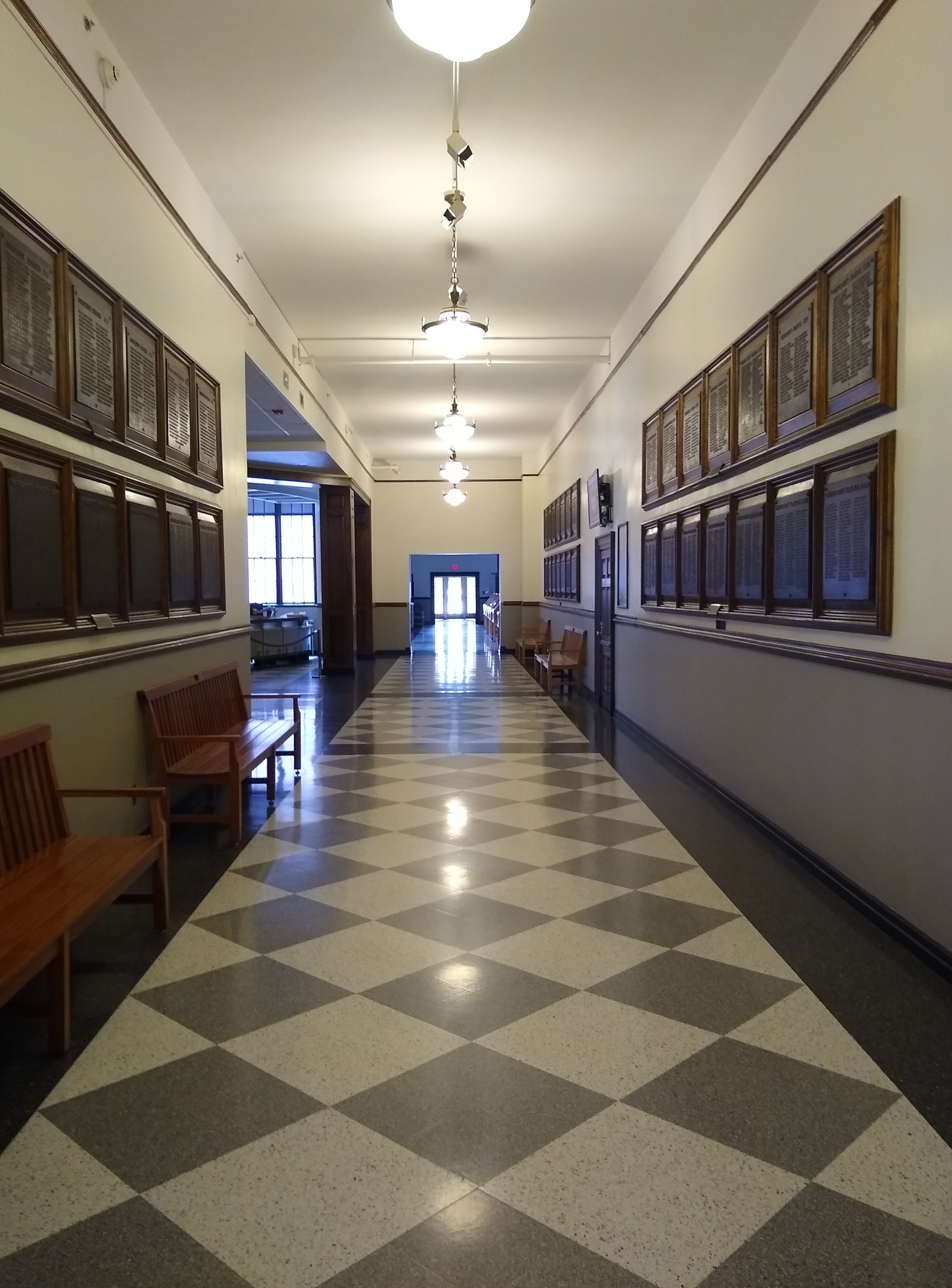
Hallway between the north and south entrances, 2021

The Main Library is one of the eleven red brick Georgian Revival buildings designed by Platt as part of his campus master plan. The main (east) facade features a three-bay main entrance with limestone archways and a green slate roof with a series of eleven dormers and four tall chimneys. Although university libraries were typically designed to be monumental focal points on their campuses, Platt instead placed the Main Library in a non-dominant position along the periphery of what would become the South Quad. However, the library's important role in university life is nevertheless expressed by its massive size. Its high arched windows are reminiscent of the Sainte-Geneviève Library and the Boston Public Library.

The Main Library's lobbies, circulation spaces, and second-floor reading room retain their elaborately detailed historic features. The reading room has 27 stained glass windows showing Renaissance printer's marks, and four Barry Faulkner murals decorate the walls of the central stairwell. The functional spaces and secondary areas of the library interior, which were originally fitted more simply than the public spaces, still retain their original wood trim.

=== Sculptures ===
The plaster model of The Pioneers, a bronze sculpture by Lorado Taft, sits in the library's south lobby. Its counterpart in the north lobby is the plaster model of Thomas Hopkins Gallaudet and Alice Cogswell by David Chester French.

Two of the four limestone sculptures that are collectively known as Sons and Daughters of Deucalion and Pyrrha flank the library's east entrance. The other two are positioned nearby, just south of Foellinger Auditorium. All four sculptures, carved by Walter Zimmerman under the direction of Lorado Taft, were displayed at Chicago's 1933 Century of Progress exposition. They were intended for a larger work called Fountain of Creation that Taft had planned for Jackson Park.

A bust of former University of Illinois president Lloyd Morey was installed in the library's east lobby in 1911. It was stolen by a group that dubbed itself the Statue Liberation Society in 1982; the group had previously stolen the bust of Abraham Lincoln from Lincoln Hall. The Morey bust was never recovered. Its alcove, which remains empty, is still engraved with his name.

== Divisions ==
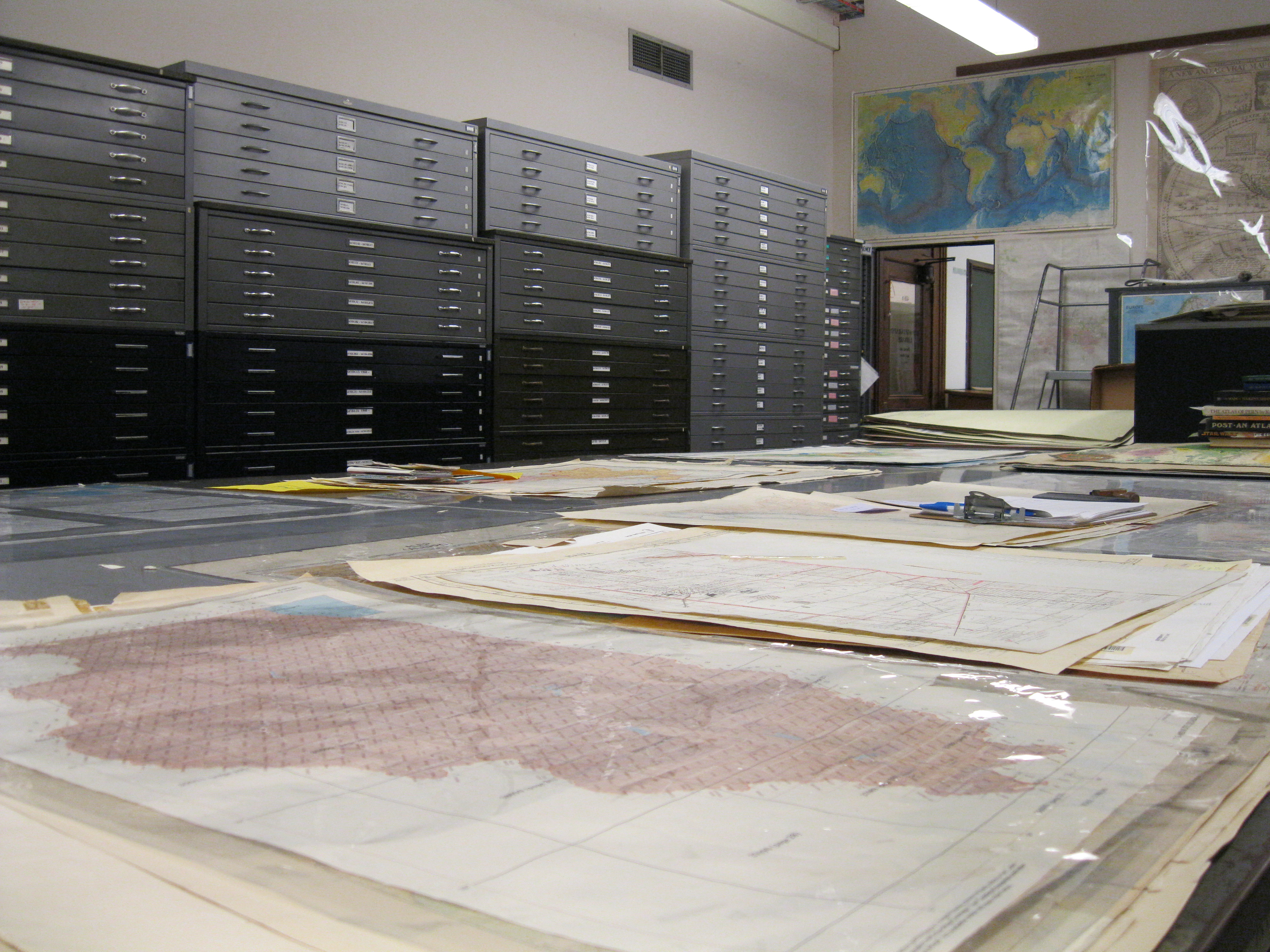
Map Library, 2013

The Main Library houses various University Library departments and branch libraries.

- Central Access Services (CAS)
- History, Philosophy, and Newspaper Library (HPNL)
- Illinois History and Lincoln Collections unit (IHLC)
- International and Area Studies Library (IASL)
- Literatures and Languages Library
- Map Library
- Rare Book and Manuscript Library (RBML)
- Research and Information Services (RIS)
- Scholarly Communications & Publishing
- Social Sciences, Health, and Education Library (SSHEL)
- University Archives

=== Rare Book & Manuscript Library ===
The Rare Book & Manuscript Library within the Main Library building is one of the largest special collections repositories in the United States. Its collections, consisting of over half a million volumes and three kilometers of manuscript material, encompass the broad areas of literature, history, art, theology, philosophy, technology and the natural sciences, and include large collections of emblem books, writings of and works about John Milton, and authors' personal papers.

== Gallery ==
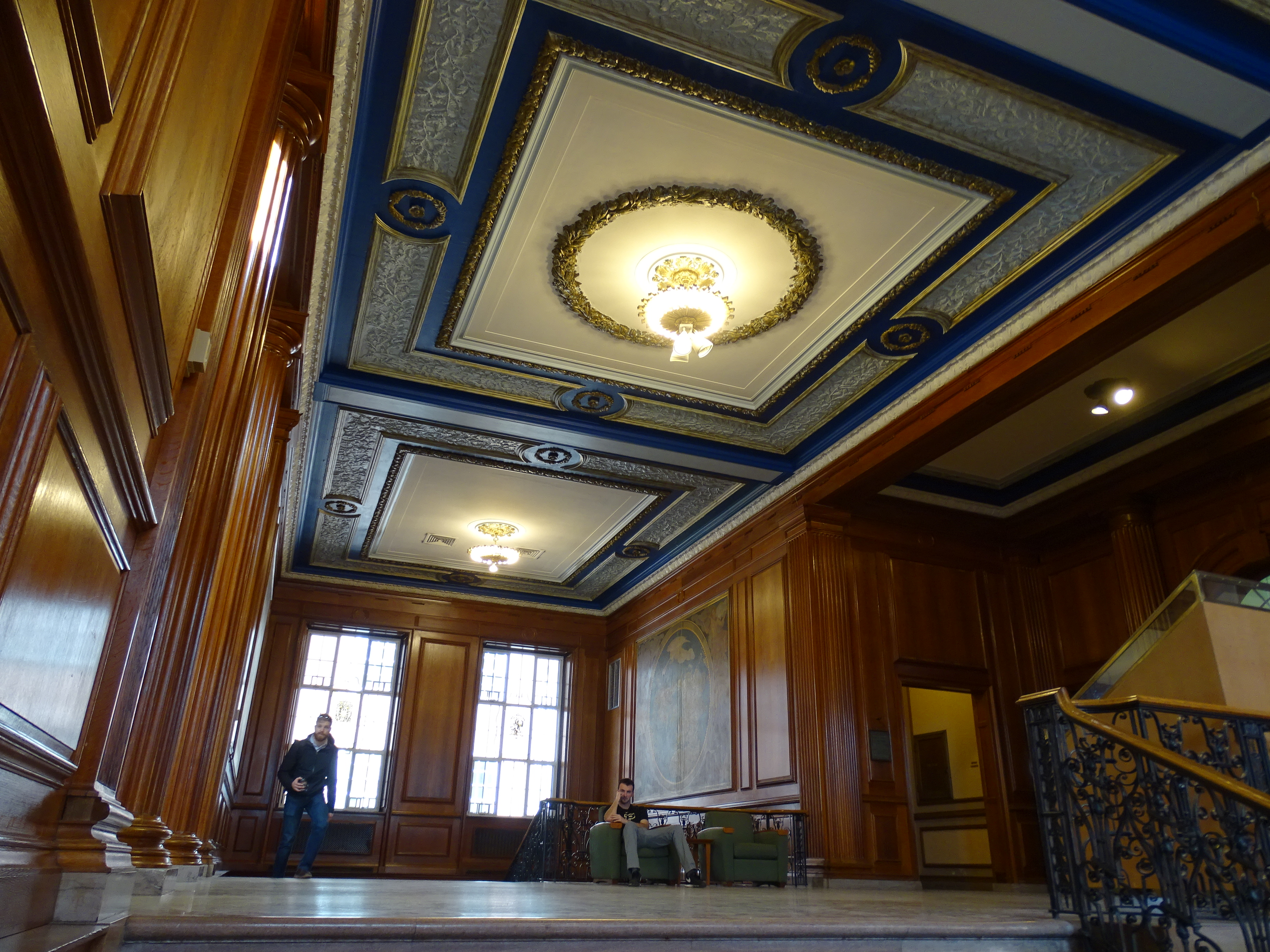
Central stair hall

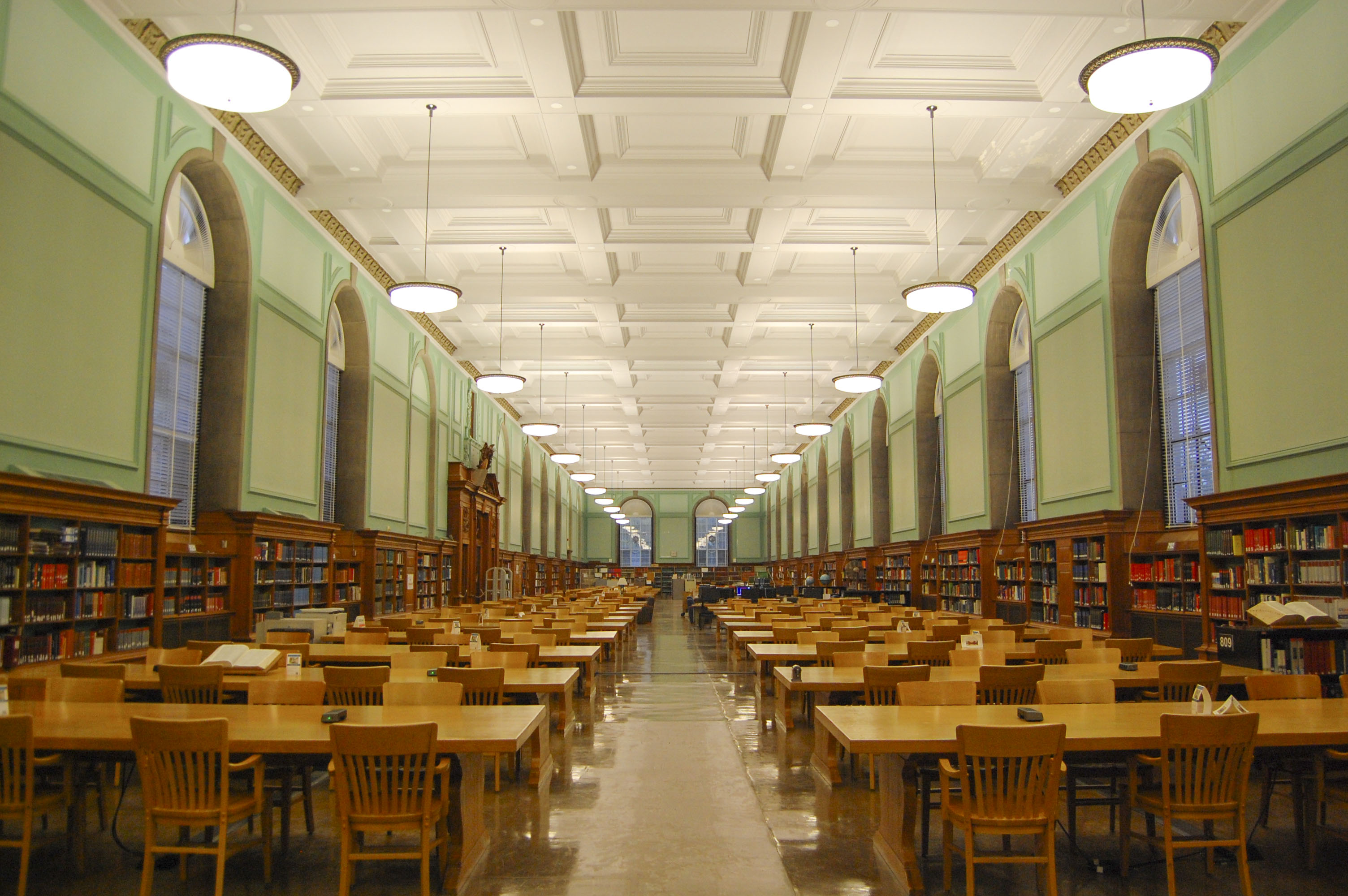
The reading room prior to its 2020 renovation

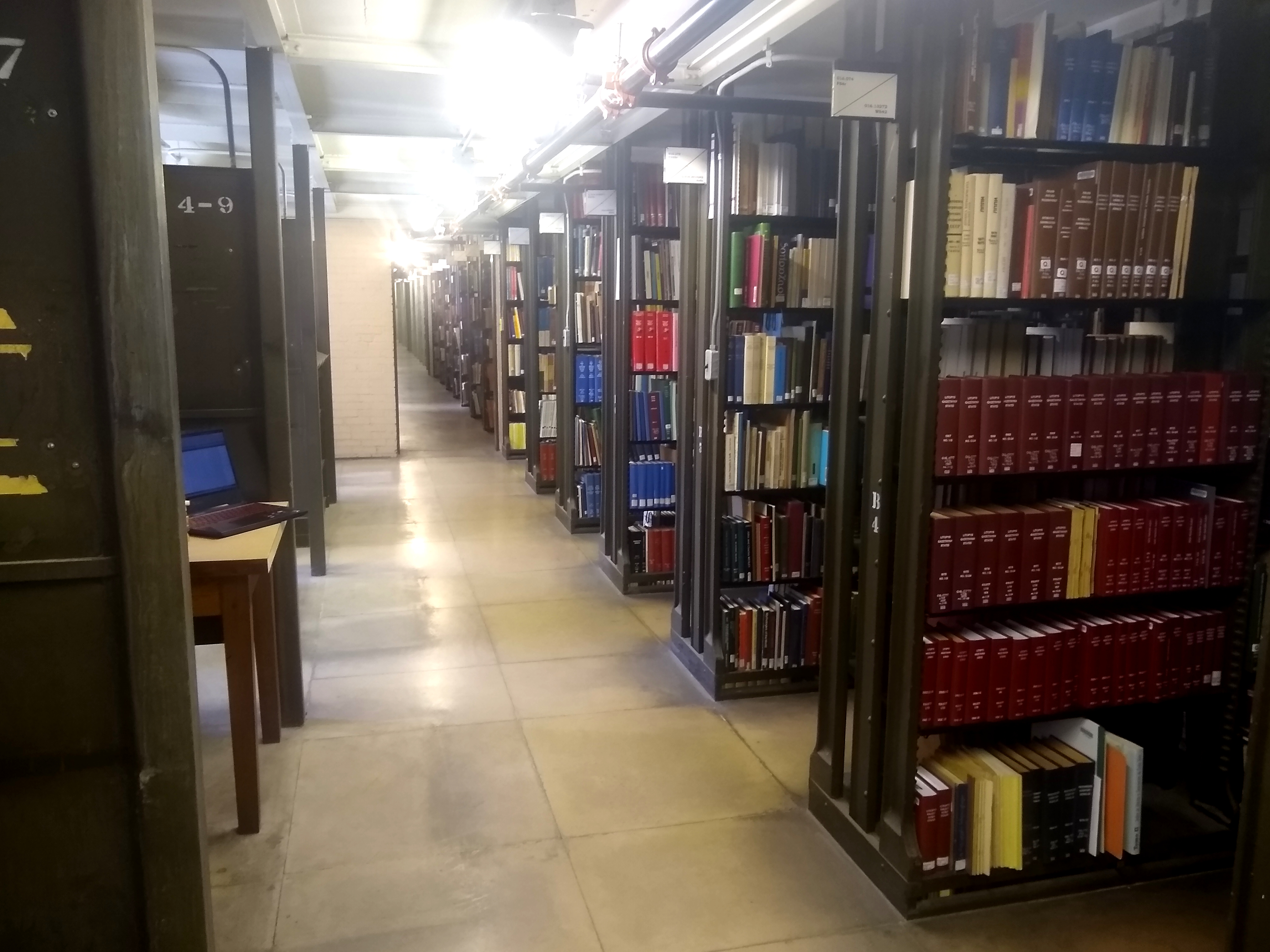
Shelving in the Main Stacks

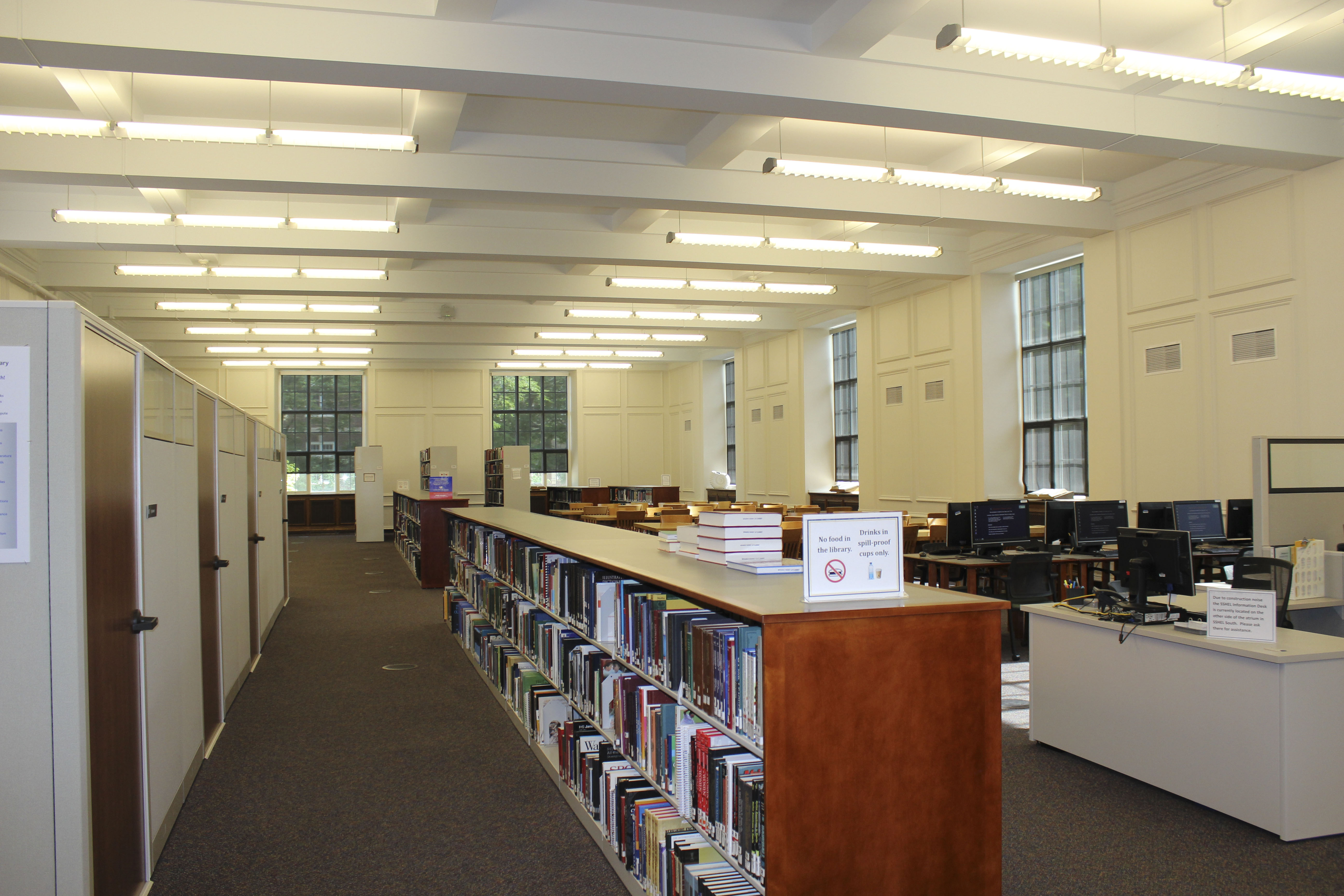
SSHEL, 2014
