= Beer and pretzels game =

Board game with few rules and high luck

A beer and pretzels game is any of a class of tabletop games that are light on rules and strategy, feature a high amount of randomness and a light theme. This is in direct contrast to Eurogames, which involve complex rules and emphasize strategy over randomness. The term was originally coined to describe relatively simple wargames that did not require extraordinary focus to play. The name was then adopted by gamers to mean casual, short and easy to play games in general. Examples of beer and pretzels games include Bohnanza, Wizwar and Pit.

== Characteristics ==
Beer and pretzels games vary greatly in theme and gameplay, but have a set of common characteristics. Rules are simple and generally explainable in just a few minutes, turns pass quickly and humor is common. Randomness, either in the form of cards or dice, is essential. Fortunes may revert quickly, and the game often ends suddenly and unexpectedly. Scoring requires very simple calculations.

From a design standpoint, beer and pretzels games are non-trivial to create. They need to have enough depth to encourage repeat play without a stiff learning curve, and need to be enjoyable in quick sessions.
