= The Armory (game company) =

Tabletop role-playing game company

The Armory was a distributor and publisher of tabletop games—RPGs, CCG, miniature wargames, board games, dice, and related merchandise—founded in 1976 by Roy Lipman. By 1997, the company—then owned by son Max Lipman—was one of the five largest distributors of RPGs and CCGs in the United States, and the second largest dice manufacturer, with annual sales exceeding $15 million.

In October 1998, The Armory merged with Chessex to form Alliance Game Distributors, becoming the largest games distributor in the United States.

== The Armory brand products ==
- Polyhedral dice: d4, d5, d8, d10, d12, d20, sets, d30, and books of tables for the d30.
- Miniatures supplies: Paint, brushes, files, and display boxes.
- RPG supplies: hex & graph paper, fantasy RPG character sheets, sheet protectors, and overlay markers.
- No. 8000-G Fantasy Role Playing Character Sheets (1981)
- No. 8002 Buyer’s Guide to Fantasy Miniatures™, Vol. 1, Issue 1 (Summer 1983)
- No. 8300 MasterScribes Kit (1979)
- #FG-1 Fantasy Gamer's Accessory Pack (1991)
- #FG-2 RPG Data Con: Data Conversion Charts (1992)
