= The Studios of Key West =

Arts center

Coordinates: 24°33′28″N 81°48′9″W

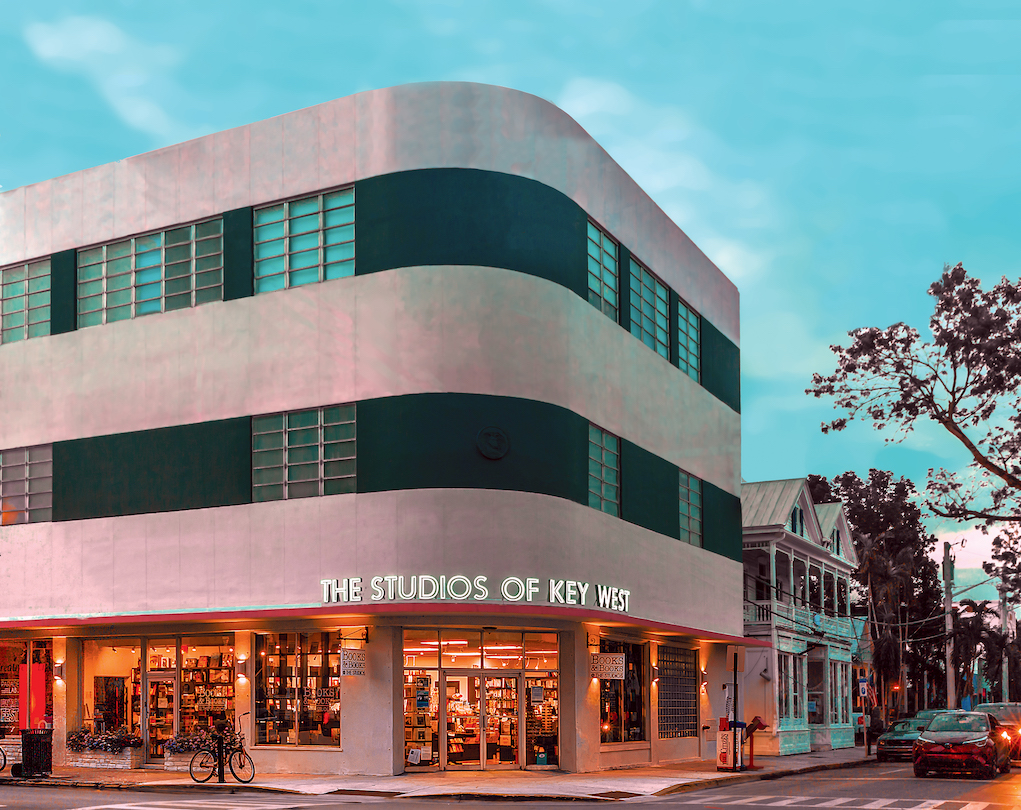
The Studios' home: the former Scottish Rite Masonic Center at Simonton and Eaton Streets

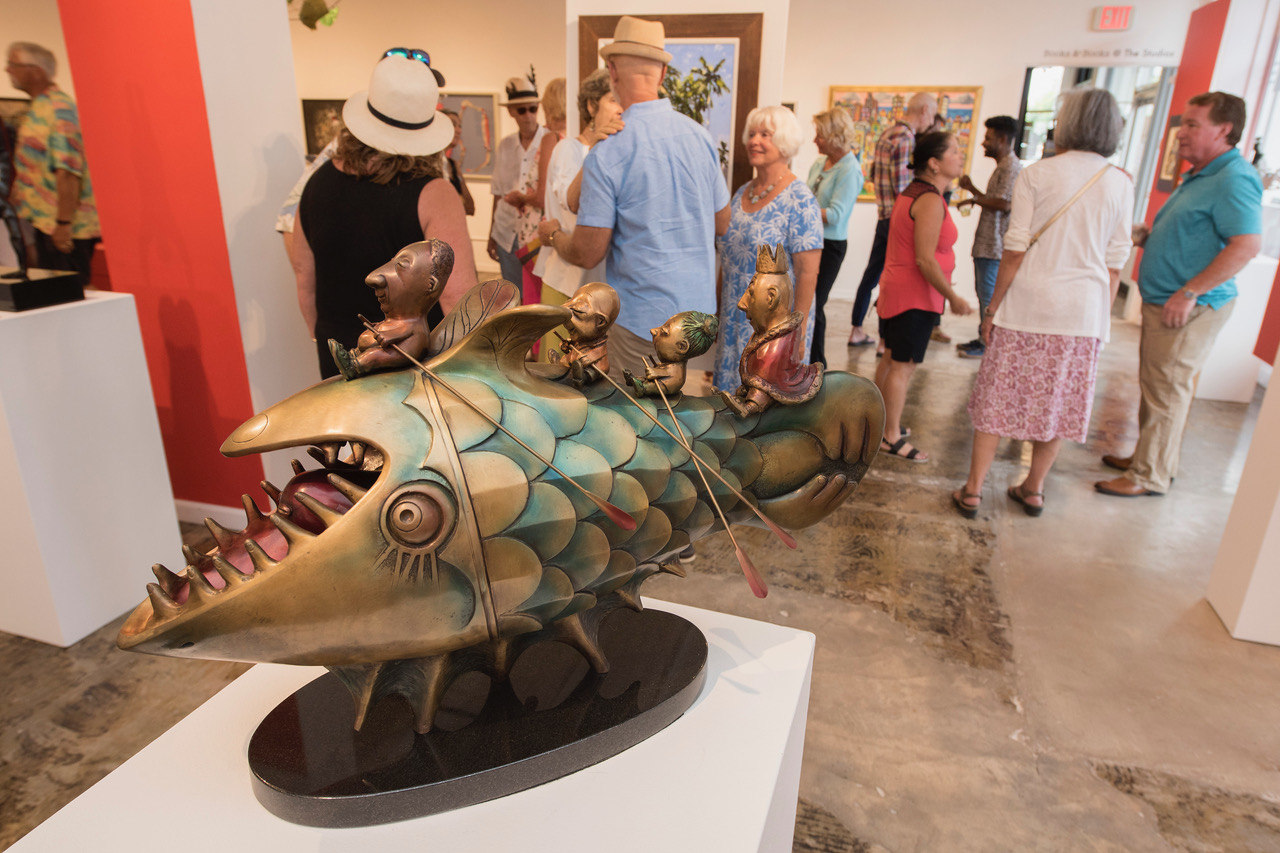
TSKW Cuba Show

The Studios of Key West is a center for the arts in Key West, an island community at the southernmost tip of the Florida Keys. Established in 2006 as a nonprofit cultural organization, The Studios works to promote multidisciplinary arts, to provide artist-in-residency opportunities for artists worldwide, and to maintain long-term studio spaces dedicated to Florida Keys artists. The organization publishes a yearly catalog of activities.

== Campus ==
=== Eaton Street Facility ===
The Studios of Key West, located at 533 Eaton Street, is in the heart of downtown Key West. The three-story building, a piece of Miami Deco architecture, was built in 1951 at the corner of Simonton and Eaton, and is the former Scottish Rite Masonic Center. After a total renovation, the building now includes Key West's largest exhibition space dedicated to contemporary art, a full bar, a box office/information center, a 200-seat auditorium, nine artists' studios, and two classrooms (Filosa). In 2019 Hugh's View, a rooftop terrace, was added to serve as The Studios’ creative space in the sky. In 2016 Books & Books @ The Studios opened offering over 2,500 titles in a variety of subjects and continues to sponsor author talks, book signings, and other events.

=== The Carriage Trade Artist House ===
Adjacent to the Eaton Street space, artist accommodations continue to anchor the Peyton Evans Artists In Residence Program at the Carriage Trade Artist House. The Studios of Key West launched a residency program in 2007. In 2019 The Studios acquired the historic guesthouse featuring a spacious courtyard and treehouse adjacent to the Eaton Street facility to be the home for Artists in Residence. The residency program hosts established and emerging artists and cultural figures from all over the world.

=== Chez Margaret Creative Annex ===
As of 2020 and thanks to Blake Hunter and Murphy Davis, The Studios has a new space for housing world-class artists and performers when they come to town. The artist house on Margaret Street also serves as an occasional event space.

== Programs ==
=== Peyton Evans Artists In Residency program ===
From hundreds of applications per year, up to 40 artists working in the literary, visual, and performing arts are selected by jury to spend a month drawing inspiration from the colorful sights, fascinating people, and remarkable culture of the island. Collaborations have included residencies for Art Students League of New York artist/instructors. Recent PEAR artists have included Esterio Segura—painter, sculpture, installation artist from Cuba; Honor Petrie—visual artist from Inverness, Scotland; Halim Flowers—social justice entrepreneur, writer, speaker from Washington DC; Carmen Sanders—wood carver, from Tucker GA; Orlando Garcia—composer of contemporary classical music from Miami Beach FL. And many others.

=== Exhibitions ===
The Studios of Key West hosts upwards of 40 exhibitions and installations each year. Proposals for exhibitions from local and visiting artists and are installed for two-week to one-month periods. The first Thursday of the month brings a recurring Key West event known as First Thursday. The Studios of Key West and other businesses and galleries in the neighborhood opens their doors for a festive gallery walk and multi-site creative adventure. The Studios of Key West presents its exhibition(s) of the month in the first-floor Sanger Gallery and adjacent Zabar Project Gallery, the second-floor Zabar Lobby Gallery, and the third-floor XOJ Gallery. Also open for First Thursday are The Studios of Key West artists' studios on the third floor. Recent exhibitions have included the work of Letty Nowak, Scott Ponemone, Katlin Spain, Robert Aiosa. And many more.

=== Workshops and classes ===
Each year between October and July, The Studios of Key West offers weekly classes, workshops, and longer-term courses that cater to island residents and visitors. The Studios' largest program serves over 1,000 people each season, with more than 50 distinct classes in a range of media for artists from beginners to professionals. Instructors include year-round local artists and artists visiting from across the globe, either to live at The Studios of Key West for a month as Artists-in-Residence or just to teach what they know. Notable among the list are painters such as Lothar Speer, Mike Rooney, Priscilla Coote, Lucy Stevens, Susan Sugar, and many more. The list also includes noted writers, musicians, photographers, jewelry makers, etc.

=== Concerts ===
The Studios of Key West also hosts a contemporary singer-songwriter series. Past performances have included Peter Mayer, Emily Saliers, Livingston Taylor, Noel Paul Stookey, Carrie Newcomer, and Ben Harrison. By popular demand, some artists make yearly appearances, like singer-songwriters Zoe Lewis and Susan Werner. Each year The Studios of Key West presents classical and chamber music concerts with esteemed musicians from around the world.

=== Performances ===
Performance at The Studios of Key West includes dance, performance art, small-scale theatrical productions, and burlesque and circus arts. Highlights have included the following: Tonya Pinkins (Jelly’s Last Jam, Tony award) presented a workshop reading of her new play with a cast from New York, Charlottesville, and Key West; Tony Shalhoub, Marisa Tomei, Alyssa Milano, Joy Behar, Judith Light, Michael R. Jackson, and many others participated in Between Two Palms, a series of 44 one-hour streaming conversations with artists; Michael Urie (Ugly Betty), Ann Harada (Avenue Q original cast), Constance Shulman (Orange is the New Black), and Colby Lewis performed in Smithtown, a streaming play reviewed by the New York Times and The New Yorker; Blake Hunter (writer/producer, Who’s the Boss, WKRP in Cincinnati) wrote and staged a full-length musical; Mark Campbell (Pulitzer Award, Stonewall) co-presented an evening of original American opera shorts; Norbert Leo Butz (2-time Tony winner, Bloodline, Dirty Rotten Scoundrels, Catch Me If You Can) performed a benefit show for hurricane victims; Dave Barry (humorist), Mike Peters and Mike Luckovich (cartoonists), who share 4 Pulitzers between them, lectured on politics and humor.

=== Lectures ===
The Studios have always been home to lectures, panel discussions, and scholarly presentations. The organisation hosts symposia and speakers of note each year. For example, it recently hosted American newspaper columnist and former assistant managing editor of The Washington Post Eugene Robinson and Pulitzer Prize for Drama winner Ayad Akhtar. Bob Perlow presented "Tales from Hollywood," which revealed an inside look at shows he's worked on from Laverne & Shirley and Cheers to The Tonight Show.

Past events in the free lecture series have include leading writing and cultural figures such as Calvin Trillin, Jean Carper, Lee Smith, Lou Harris, former US Poet Laureate Maxine Kumin, poet Billy Collins, and authors James Gleick, Barbara Ehrenreich, Judy Blume, and Meg Cabot.

=== Youth education ===
Central to its community programs are youth education programs and creative experiences designed to last a lifetime, presented in collaboration with other institutional partners such as the Marion Stevens Fund. School at The Studios launched in 2019, a partnership with May Sands Montessori School, with the galleries getting transformed into living classrooms for elementary and middle school students to visit. Also, The Studios is proudly home to the Key West High School's Drama Club, hosting regular rehearsals as well as their spectacular Spring Musical and Holiday Review. The popular annual Summer Art Camp has different themes each week throughout the summer and plenty of one-on-one attention through small class size and hands-on activities.

The Studios' newest youth program is the Youth Arts Fellowship, where each year, a small number of high-achieving high school artists are hand picked for one-on-one mentoring by professional artists to get them ready for college and beyond. Youth Arts Fellows also benefit from free access to Studios' classes and events and other pre-professional support.

=== Glow Hours ===
Hugh’s View sits on the roof of The Studios main building offering panoramic vistas across the rooftops of Old Town, from the Gulf of Mexico on one side to the Atlantic on the other. Comradery, cash bar, and Key West's famous sunsets.

=== Artist studio tours ===
An almost annual event, the studio tours are organized around different locations and an ever-changing variety of Key West artists including wood workers, welders, potters, jewelry makers, painters, and more.

== History ==
The Studios of Key West proceeds from the traditional approach to the artist colony established by the likes of Yaddo and the MacDowell Colony and expanded more recently by Anderson Ranch, the Vermont Studio Center, and the Atlantic Center for the Arts. Founding executive director Eric Holowacz was installed in early 2007 and was responsible for developing and implementing a strategic plan and building the organisation, programming, partnerships, community engagement ethic, and brand from the ground up.

Between 2001 and 2006, initial ideas for The Studios of Key West were developed by civic and arts leaders throughout the community. The Studios of Key West was officially established in 2006 as a 501(c)3 non-profit organization cultural organization, and soon after began building a campus in and around the historic Key West Armory building. Following the initial strategic plan, Holowacz rapidly developed the campus, programming, brand, and external partnerships as a combination of artist studios and residencies and inclusive community and cultural programming. The key founding staff included Sharon McGauley, Elena Devers, and Lauren McAloon. Founding Board members were Peyton Evans, Lynn Kaufelt, John Martini, Ken Domanski and Ann Henderson; and the first home for The Studios of Key West was the historic Armory on White Street, originally built between 1900–1903 as the drill hall and armory for the Florida state militia. Following continued growth over its first decade, The Studios of Key West acquired a new headquarters at 533 Eaton Street, where the non-profit organization has been based since 2015.
