= Chessex =

American dice company

Chessex Manufacturing
- Type: Private
- Industry: Game supplies, former Game publisher
- Predecessor: Chessex, The Armory
- Founded: 1987; 39 years ago
- Headquarters: Fort Wayne, IN, United States
- Website: http://chessex.com

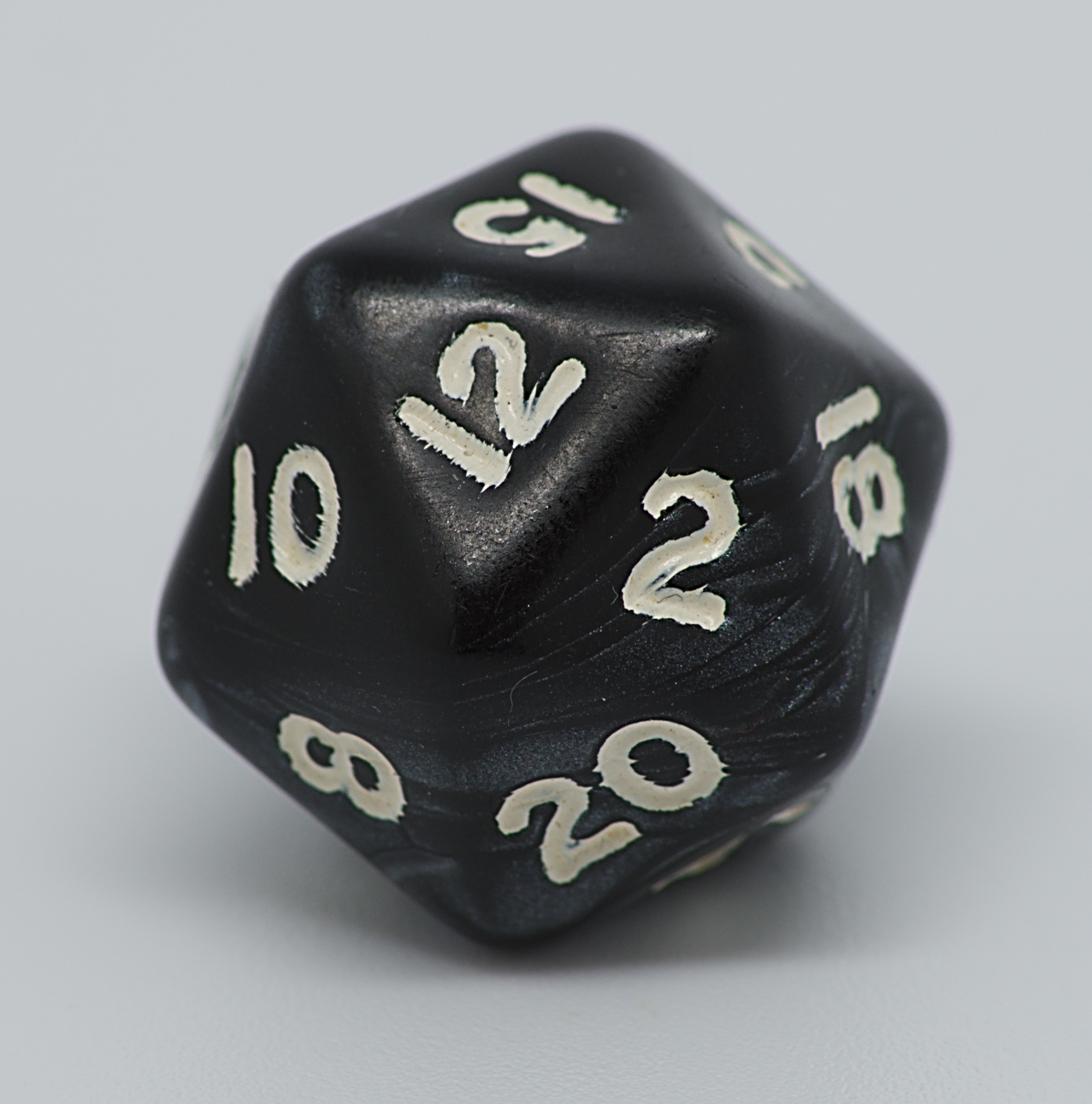
20 sided die

Chessex Manufacturing is an American company that sells dice, primarily for the role-playing game (RPG) and collectible card game (CCG) market. It also offers other accessories used in RPGs and CCGs. The company also has a Chessex Europe branch office.

Chessex was also a distributor and publisher of tabletop games—RPGs, CCG, miniature wargames, board games, and related merchandise—until October 1998 when they merged distribution with The Armory to form Alliance Game Distributors.

== Games published ==
- Banemaster: The Adventure (1995) collectible card game.
- Skyrealms of Jorune (1984–1994) role-playing game.
- Wiz-War (1993–2010) A board game originally self published by Tom Jolly starting in 1985, Chessex published the 4th through 7th editions of the game and a single expansion. While they continued to have rights to the game until 2010 the game was sold out and unavailable shortly after 2000.
