= The Armory (Key West) =

- U.S. National Register of Historic Places
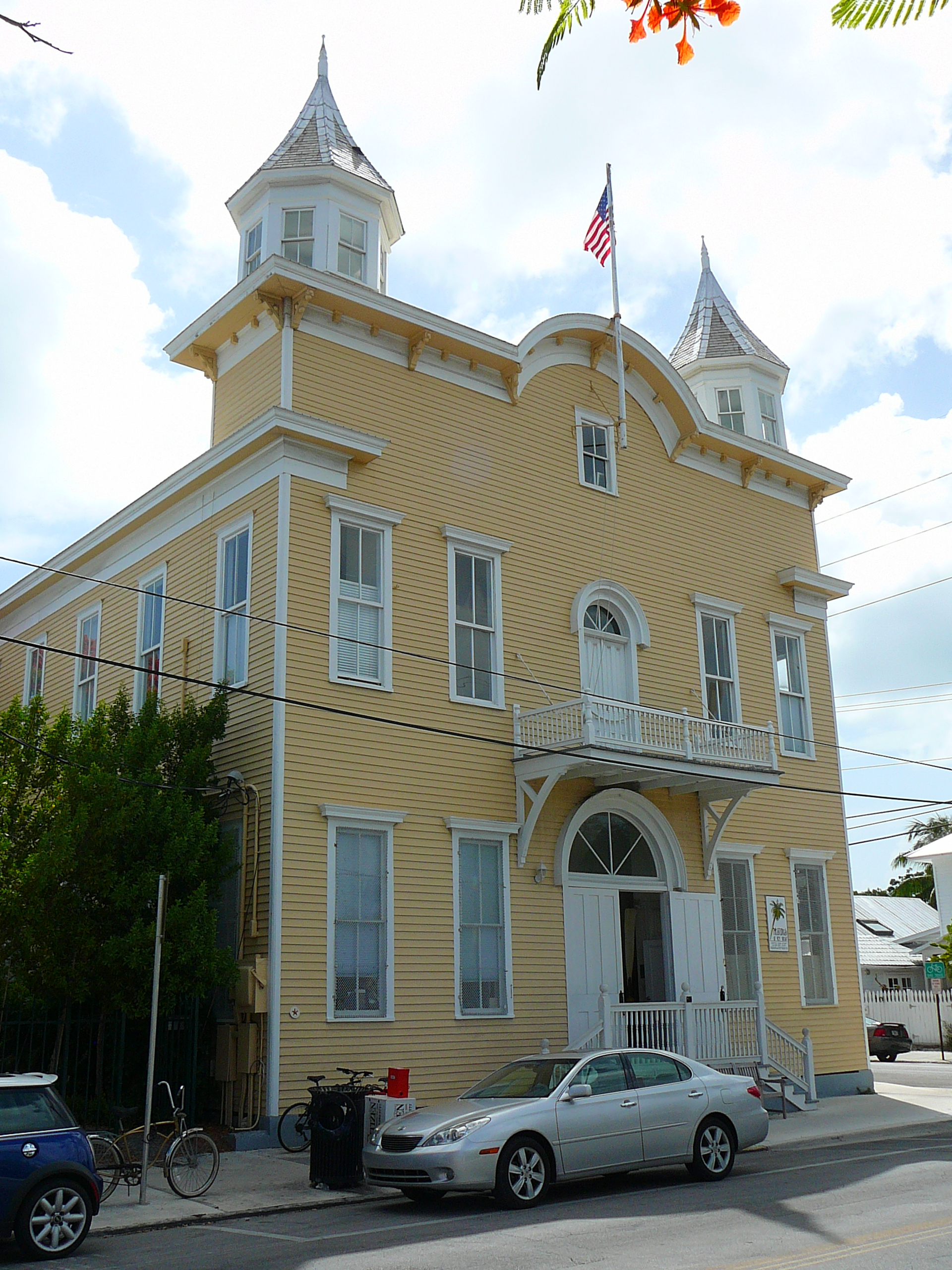
- The old Armory on White Street

- Location within Florida Location within the United States
- Location: Key West, Florida
- Coordinates: 24.55969°N 81.79404°W
- Area: 0.1 acres (0.040 ha)
- Built: 1901
- Built by: John T. Sawyer
- Architect: T.F. Russell
- Architectural style: Gothic
- NRHP reference No.: 71000243
- Added to NRHP: March 11, 1971

The Armory is a historic site in Key West, Florida, United States. It is located at 600 White Street. In 1971, it was added to the United States National Register of Historic Places.

The armory was built to support military training and readiness of local military reserves. In 1877, the "Key West Rifles", a voluntary military company, organized with 80 members. It was not very professional, and after the fire of 1886 destroyed all of its equipment, it ceased to exist. In 1888, a 32-member company named the "Island City Guards" was organized, which would eventually become Company 1, Second Regiment of Infantry, Florida State Troops. It is now part of the National Guard.

Land for an armory was purchased by Monroe County in 1901. The armory was designed by T. F. Russell and built in 1901 by John T. Sawyer. In 1903, upon a ruling by the Florida Supreme Court, the state of Florida refunded the cost to the county and took ownership.

In 2006, it became the home and initial campus of The Studios of Key West, a new artist community offering creative space, professional workshops, and other creative and cultural activities.

After The Studios of Key West moved to their new headquarters, at 533 Eaton Street, in 2015, The Armory eventually became home to 12 artist studios. 'Artists at the Armory' are located on the second floor. The main hall is available for lease and is often used as a rehearsal space by local theater companies or as an exhibition space.

The Historic Florida Keys Foundation (HFKF) leases the Armory from the State of Florida. The HFKF manages the Armory and oversees its maintenance.

The Armory received a Historic Florida Keys Foundation Preservation Award in 2008.

== References and external links ==
- Florida's Office of Cultural and Historical Programs
  - Monroe County listings
  - The Armory
  - The Studios of Key West
