= Wiz-War =

Strategy board game

- Designers: Tom Jolly
- Publishers: Jolly Games (1985-1992), Chessex (1993-2010) Fantasy Flight Games (2012), Steve Jackson Games (2023)
- Publication: 1985
- Players: 2-5
- Playing time: 15-60 minutes

Wiz-War is a four-player board game created by Tom Jolly and first published in 1985 through Jolly’s company, Jolly Games. It is described as a "beer and pretzels game".

The board in Wiz-War is made up of individual segments that form a labyrinth that the players must navigate. The layout is different each time the game is played and can also be modified by players during gameplay. Wiz-War uses cards to represent (among other things) spells cast by players.

== Publication history ==
Tom Jolly started designing Wiz-War in 1983. After several rejections and redesigns he self-published and hand-assembled the first edition of Wiz-War, selling the game through his company Jolly Games. The first edition has low production value, consisting of photocopied typewritten rules, simply designed two-by-three-inch cards, hand-silkscreened cardboard boards, and photocopied chits, all contained in a clear plastic Ziploc bag. The second, third, and fourth editions feature higher production values and a brown box featuring cover art by Jolly. Jolly also self-published two expansions starting in 1988 and 1991, respectively.

Wiz-War was then published by Chessex under license from Tom Jolly. Their fourth edition was mostly unchanged from Jolly's fourth edition. The fifth edition was released in 1991 and featured the same box as the previous edition but updated contents. The sixth edition, published in 1993, featured a new larger blue box, new cover and token art by Phil Morrissey, and updated rules. The third expansion with a purple box but the same cover art by Morrissey was also released during this time. The seventh edition, published in 1997, retained the packaging of the sixth edition but updated the contents again. Chessex and Jolly renewed their publishing agreement in 2000 and in 2002 announced an eighth edition would be released, but the release was delayed for many years. Meanwhile, the 7th edition of Wiz-War was allowed to go out of print. In 2009 Jolly announced that he had canceled the contract with Chessex and had reached an agreement to republish the game with Fantasy Flight Games.

Fantasy Flight Games released the eighth edition in 2012 with modified rules and completely redone artwork, game pieces, and packaging. Fantasy Flight Games also released two expansions for their edition of the game: Malefic Curses and Bestial Forces. The first expansion added an additional board segment, more content, and allowed another player to join in. The second expansion added three schools of magic, several summonable monsters, and also additional content. All Wiz-War products from Fantasy Flight Games have since gone out of print and are no longer available.

On October 9, 2019, Steve Jackson Games confirmed they would produce the 9th edition of Wiz-War. They formally announced they had acquired the rights to publish their own edition of Wiz-War with an announcement of an artist to be confirmed later. Phil Foglio was signed to produce the art and Steve Jackson Games confirmed they would release the game via Kickstarter to gauge interest. The 9th edition of Wiz War was released by Steve Jackson Games in July 2023.

== Description ==
An example of an elaborate homemade wood Wiz-War board. This board configuration includes a seventh homemade board segment allowing for larger games.

Wiz-War is a turn-based board game for two to four players that takes place in a dungeon. Each player is a wizard who seeks to steal the other wizards' treasures, aided by spells and magical items.

=== Setup ===
Each player places their wizard token and two treasures on a home base. Each player is dealt a number of cards that represent spells, objects and actions that can be taken. Each player begins the game with fifteen life points that can be lost in a variety of ways.

=== Gameplay ===
The object of the game is to steal two treasures from opponents while also retaining two. If a player successfully steals a treasure but in the meantime loses a treasure to another player, then the player is no further ahead.

The relative simplicity of the game is deceiving; turns can be structured in a highly complex and sophisticated way to take maximum advantage of the cards in a player's hand and avoid interference by other players.

=== Out of the game ===
A player who loses both of their treasures or all of their life points is out of the game.

=== Victory conditions ===
A player wins by either

- Accumulating two of their opponent's treasures on their home base.
- Eliminating all other players.

== Reception ==
In April 1990, Ken Rolston of Dragon magazine called the first edition "a cheap-and-cheerful" game with "fairly primitive components". He liked the "fast, interesting play with lots of action and entertainment", and concluded that "It's an ideal game for killing an idle hour."

In January 1993, Lester Smith of Dragon magazine liked the fifth edition of the game published by Chessex in 1993. His only criticism was of the cards, which he thought were of poor quality and therefore unlikely to stand up to repeated play, saying "the game strikes me as just a bit pricey, considering its components. ... if you like fast-paced, cutthroat, back-stabbing, fang-snapping ... games (at least on occasion), and if you can find other such people to play as well, then the Wiz-War game comes highly recommended."

In December 1993, Allen Varney of Dragon magazine reviewed the Chessex's fifth edition, saying, "It's a kick, it's a hoot, it's a blast! ... Creative, savvy, elegant in its way, and utterly fearless in inventing bizarre effects, the game achieves a goofy charm."

Mark Rouleau reviewed Wiz-War 6th edition in White Wolf Inphobia #50 (Dec., 1994), rating it a 3 out of 5 and stated that "The price is right, and the components (aside from the card) are well made. Unfortunately, the basic game only has components enough for four players. If you want to play with more people, you'll have to pick up the Wiz-War Expansion Set."

Wiz-War was chosen for inclusion in the 2007 book Hobby Games: The 100 Best. John Wick called Wiz-War "an exercise in cutthroat strategy" and "a damn funny game that will make you cry."
