= Health in Sierra Leone =

Available healthcare and health status in Sierra Leone is rated very poorly. Globally, infant and maternal mortality rates remain among the highest. The major causes of illness within the country are preventable with modern technology and medical advances. Most deaths within the country are attributed to nutritional deficiencies, lack of access to clean water, pneumonia, diarrheal diseases, anemia, malaria, tuberculosis and HIV/AIDS.

The Human Rights Measurement Initiative finds that Sierra Leone is fulfilling 62.1% of what it should be fulfilling for the right to health based on its level of income. When looking at the right to health with respect to children, Sierra Leone achieves 76.8% of what is expected based on its current income. In regard to the right to health amongst the adult population, the country achieves only 67.3% of what is expected based on the nation's level of income. Sierra Leone falls into the "very bad" category when evaluating the right to reproductive health because the nation is fulfilling only 42.3% of what the nation is expected to achieve based on the resources (income) it has available.

== Health status ==
The 2014 CIA estimated average life expectancy in Sierra Leone was 57.39 years. In 2015, after improvements in health in other poorer countries life expectancy for both men and women was the lowest in the world.

=== Disability ===
It is estimated that there are about 450,000 disabled people in Sierra Leone, though number could be under-estimated. Common disabilities in Sierra Leone include blindness, deafness, war wounded, amputees and post-polio syndrome.

=== Emergency medical response ===
In 2019, having lacked an organised rapid emergency medical response, the First Responder Coalition of Sierra Leone (FRCSL) was established by five national and international organizations in June to develop emergency first responder programs across Sierra Leone. The founding members of the Coalition were the Sierra Leone Red Cross Society, LFR International, the University of Makeni, Holy Spirit Hospital, and Agency for Rural Community Transformation. The establishment of the FRCSL was timely as the 72nd World Health Assembly had declared emergency care systems essential to universal health coverage in May. The Coalition began work in Makeni, training 1,000 community members to be first responders over a two-month period and equipping each with first aid skills and materials.

=== Endemic diseases ===
Yellow fever and malaria are endemic to Sierra Leone.

Sierra Leone's entire estimated population of 6.5 million is vulnerable to malaria. Over two million outpatient visits are reported due to malaria annually, of which half are children under five years of age. The 2016 Malaria Indicator Survey demonstrated parasitemia ranges from 6 percent in Western Urban to 58 percent in Koinadugu district, among children 6–59 months of age. Malaria transmission has two peaks, during the rainy season in May and in October/November. Plasmodium falciparum causes the majority of infections.

=== Maternal and child healthcare ===
Of the 20 countries with the highest incidence of maternal mortality, 19 of them are located in Sub-Saharan Africa, with the highest rates in the world occurring in Sierra Leone. One in seventeen women risks dying during pregnancy or childbirth.

The 2015 maternal mortality rate per 100,000 births for Sierra Leone is 1,360. This is compared with 970 in 2010 and 1032 in 2008. The under 5 mortality rate, per 1,000 births is 198 and the neonatal mortality as a percentage of under 5's mortality is 25. In Sierra Leone the number of midwives per 1,000 live births is 1 and the lifetime risk of death for pregnant women 1 in 21.

Since the Ebola outbreak of 2014/2015, healthcare facilities have been associated with pain and death. Africans are choosing to reject the safety of hospitals out for any sort of care, especially for childbirth. It is estimated that maternal mortality rates will increase by 74 percent in the coming years. This statistic has been called the "next wave of deaths from Ebola " due to the potential increase in maternal deaths because of the avoidance of hospitals.

The Paul E. Farmer Maternal Center of Excellence in Koidu contains the nation's only neonatal intensive care unit. The maternity hospital opened in 2026 through partnership between the Sierra Leonean government and Partners in Health.

=== Mental health ===
Mental health care in Sierra Leone is almost non-existent. Many sufferers try to cure themselves with the help of traditional healers. During the Civil War (1991–2002), many soldiers took part in atrocities and many children were forced to fight. This left them traumatised, with an estimated 400,000 people (by 2009) being mentally ill. Thousands of former child soldiers have fallen into substance abuse as they try to blunt their memories using cannabis and Kush, the newly developed synthetic drug. There is only one psychiatric facility in Sierra Leone, the Sierra Leone Psychiatric Teaching Hospital in Freetown. It gained media attention in 2024 for its participation in mental health reform across the country.

=== Opioid addiction ===
“Kush” is a synthetic drug prevalent in Sierra Leone, containing synthetic opioids in the form of Nitazenes, or synthetic cannabinoids. Chemicals are ordered from China and then mixed in labs in Sierra Leone’s capital Freetown. The resulting liquid is sprayed onto plant material, to be smoked and sold as kush.

The synthetic opioids and cannabinoids in the drugs are highly addictive. Kush’s prevalence has fuelled police corruption in Sierra Leone. ‘Cartels’ are the local name for kush smoking bars.

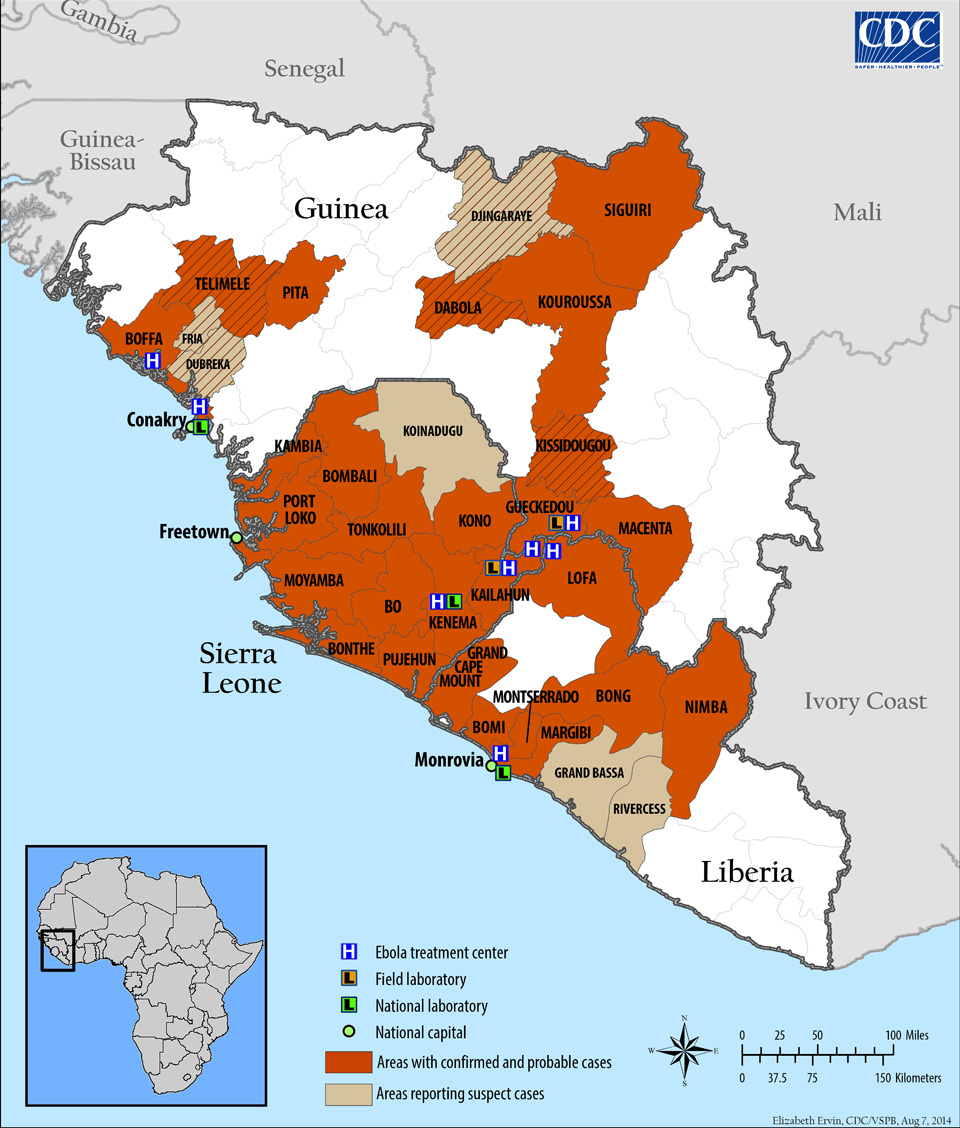
A situation map of the Ebola outbreak in August 2014.

=== Infectious diseases ===
Sierra Leone suffers from epidemic outbreaks of diseases including cholera, Lassa fever, and meningitis.

==== HIV/AIDS ====
Sierra Leone has a prevalence of HIV/AIDS in the population of 1.6 percent.

==== Ebola ====
In 2014 there was an outbreak of the Ebola virus in Sierra Leone. As of August 4, 2014, there had been 691 cases of Ebola in Sierra Leone and 286 deaths.

==== COVID-19 ====
On March 31, 2020 the coronavirus first reached Sierra Leone.

== Health conditions and human rights in Sierra Leone ==
=== HIV/AIDS ===
Discrimination based on HIV status is illegal, but HIV-positive people are highly stigmatized, with HIV-positive children being denied schooling, adults denied jobs, and abandonment by families common. Persons with HIV are often driven to suicide.

== Leading causes of death ==
In 2019, the 10 leading causes of death in Sierra Leone were:

1. Malaria
2. Lower respiratory infections
3. Neonatal disorders
4. Diarrheal diseases
5. Ischemic heart disease
6. Tuberculosis
7. Stroke
8. Congenital defects
9. HIV/AIDS
10. Meningitis

== Water supply and sanitation ==
A 2006 national survey found that 84% of the urban population and 32% of the rural population had access to an improved water source. Those with access in rural areas were served almost exclusively by protected wells. The 68% of the rural population without access to an improved water source relied on surface water (50%), unprotected wells (9%) and unprotected springs (9%).

20% of the urban population and 1% of the rural population had access to piped drinking water in their home.

Access to an improved water source does not give an indication about whether water supply is continuous. For example, in Freetown taps were running dry for most of the year in 2009. People collected water in containers wherever they can and those who can afford it install water tanks on their houses. Even the fire brigade used its trucks to sell drinking water. There were fights between firefighters and employees of the Guma Water Company, responsible for water supply in Freetown, sometimes resulting in deaths.

== See also ==
- Healthcare in Sierra Leone
