= Peter G. Delaney =

American researcher

- Education: University School; Washington University in St. Louis (BA); University of Michigan Medical School (MD)
- Known for: LFR Model; LFR International
- Awards: Prince Michael International Road Safety Award (2020)
- Scientific career
- Fields: Global road safety
- Academic advisors: Krishnan Raghavendran; Bradley Stoner

Peter G. Delaney is the Executive Director of LFR International and a road safety researcher responsible for the Lay First Responder Model of emergency medical services development in resource-limited countries, awarded the Prince Michael International Road Safety Award in 2020.

== Education ==
Delaney was raised in Shaker Heights, a suburb of Cleveland, Ohio, and graduated from University School, an all-boys school in Hunting Valley, Ohio.

He attended Washington University in St. Louis after being awarded the Florence Moog Fellowship in Biological and Chemical Sciences. He wrote his senior honors thesis under Bradley Stoner on unconventional emergency medical services development in austere, resource-limited settings after conducting ethnographic research in Uganda and Chad on local notions of traumatic injury and first responder training, which was awarded the W.H.R. Rivers Award for exceptional research in medical social science and public health.

Delaney attended the University of Michigan Medical School, where he became a researcher at the Michigan Center for Global Surgery under Krishnan Raghavendran. While at Michigan, he received the annual University of Michigan Department of Surgery's Student Research Award and was one of 43 medical students nationally to be awarded an Alpha Omega Alpha Carolyn L. Kuckein Student Research Fellowship. He graduated AΩA with Distinction in Research, the Sujal Parikh Award, and the Dean's Award for Research Excellence.

== Career ==
Delaney advises the United Nations Road Safety Fund: Platform on Health and Road Safety to identify high-impact global road safety projects and to advise funding allocation supporting Sustainable Development Goal 3.6 to halve the number of road traffic deaths and injuries by 2030.

He was a signatory of the First Responder Coalition of Sierra Leone in Makeni, Sierra Leone in 2019.

== Research ==
His research has been funded by the United States Agency for International Development (USAID) and focuses on emergency medical services development in resource-limited settings, especially in regard to cost-effectiveness, impact measurement, and mobile dispatch integration, which has appeared in Injury, World Journal of Surgery, Journal of Surgical Research, Prehospital and Disaster Medicine and Emergency Medicine Journal, among others. He is an invited peer reviewer to academic journals for injury-related research.

=== LFR Model ===
Delaney first described the Lay First Responder Model in the World Journal of Surgery in 2018, as an approach to out-of-hospital emergency care development that leverages pre-existing transportation infrastructure by training transportation providers as first responders to rapidly deploy and scale emergency medical services in austere prehospital settings of resource-limited low- and middle-income countries. Since initial implementation in Uganda, the LFR model has been deployed in Chad, Sierra Leone, Kenya, and Nigeria.

=== PETCAT ===
He developed PETCAT (Prehospital Emergency Trauma Care Assessment Tool), a survey tool now used to independently assess the provision of out-of-hospital emergency care in resource-limited low- and middle-income settings.

== Honours ==
His work in post-crash response with LFR International on the "LFR Post-Crash Response Program Model for Road Traffic Injuries in Resource-Limited African Settings" received the Prince Michael International Road Safety Award for outstanding achievement and innovation to improve global road safety in December 2020. To further evaluate the scalability of digital training for lay first responders, he was awarded $200,000 in funding by the United States Agency for International Development (USAID) through the Development Innovation Ventures (DIV) program to conduct a three-year randomized controlled trial in Sierra Leone in 2024.

He received the 2020 Excellence in Research Award from the American College of Surgeons and was subsequently profiled in a supplemental issue of the Journal of the American College of Surgeons. In 2022, he was interviewed by the vice-chair of the American College of Surgeons Board of Regents, Steven Wexner, on the ACS podcast Surgeons Voices regarding his work in prehospital trauma care.
