= Healthcare in Sierra Leone =

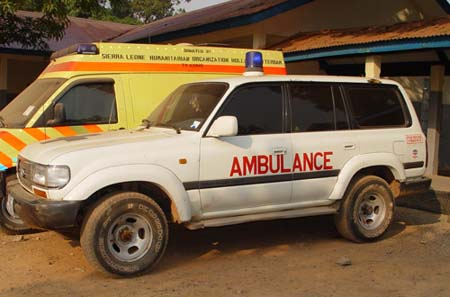
Sierra Leone ambulances

Healthcare in Sierra Leone is generally charged for and is provided by a mixture of government, private and non-governmental organizations (NGOs). There are over 100 NGOs operating in the health care sector in Sierra Leone. The Ministry of Health and Sanitation is responsible for organizing health care and after the end of the civil war the ministry changed to a decentralized structure of health provision to try to increase its coverage.

== Infrastructure ==
Sierra Leone is divided into 13 health districts that correspond to the districts of Sierra Leone except for the Western Area Rural and Western Area Urban districts which are combined into the Western Area Health district. Each district has a health management team and an average of 50 peripheral health units (PHU) and over 100 technical staff. The management team is responsible for planning, organizing and monitoring health provision, training personnel, working with communities and supplying equipment and drugs.

The PHUs are designed to be the delivery point for primary health care in the country and there are three main types.

- The community health centre carries out health prevention measures, cures and health promotion activities and is in charge of overseeing the other PHUs in the area. It is planned that each chiefdom, the unit of local government in Sierra Leone below the level of district, should have at least one community health centre.
- Community health posts perform a similar function to community health centres but have fewer facilities and are used to refer patients to the health centre or the district hospital.
- Maternal and Child Health posts are the first level of contact on the ground and are located in smaller towns with populations between 500-2000. Much of the health care infrastructure was decimated during the Civil War and the health service is still in the process of being organised with hospitals and PHU being rebuilt or created and staff being trained.

== Free healthcare project ==
In April 2010 Sierra Leone launched "Free Health Care Medical Insurance", a system of free healthcare for pregnant and breast-feeding women and children under five. A UN population Fund representative said that medical equipment had been ordered and some drugs distributed as part of the new healthcare initiative but the coverage was not yet 100%. The initial set up cost of the project was $19 million and it is expected to save the lives of more than a million mothers and children.

Healthcare workers had gone on strike over the plans in March 2010 arguing that free healthcare would increase their workload and working hours, the government settled the dispute with pay rises of 200-500%. Observers argue that many of the women concerned do not even know they have a right for free medical care and that the law would remain a paper tiger if more earnings from the extractive sector was not invested in the countries healthcare system.

The project is funded mainly by the United Kingdom and United Nations who have paid to refurbish hospitals, supply drugs and pay healthcare professionals' wages. The UK alone has agreed to pay for a years worth of drugs for the program and the World Health Organization has provided blood banks in each major town. The British government's funding came from the Department for International Development (DFID) and amounted to $22.6 million to fund the project for the next three years from a total allocation of $70.5 million for the 10-year-long "Reproduction and Child Health Care" plan. UNICEF also received $7 million from DFID to provide medicines for pregnant women.

=== Hospitals ===
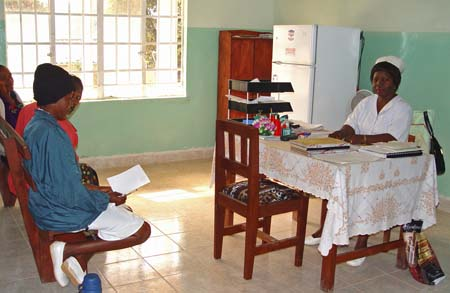
Nurse at Koidu Hospital consulting with patients.

There were about 80 hospitals in Sierra Leone in 2020.

- Choithram Memorial Hospital, Freetown, 8.45491678760561°N 13.248621145925025°W
- Connaught Hospital, Freetown, 8.488431°N 13.238409°W
- Pujehun Government Hospital, Pujehun, 7.3503660115298395°N 11.718732190116906°W
- Hatfield Archer Memorial Hospital, Rotifunk, 8.48882844309534°N 13.238610972652886°W
- Holy Spirit Hospital, Makeni, 8.892507°N 12.036286°W
- Life care Hospital
- Kerry Town Ebola Clinic, Kerry Town, 8.262693000687987°N 13.090504990108888°W
- Koidu Government Hospital, Koidu, 8.64911°N 10.96567°W
- Masanga Hospital, Masanga, 8.749249°N 11.837149°W
- Njala University Campus Hospital, Bonjema, 8.241165478715931°N 12.109691686216474°W
- Ola During Children's Hospital, Freetown, 8.509702583663435°N 13.21801349729919°W
- Princess Christian Maternity Hospital, Freetown, 8.490337°N 13.218968°W
- Sierra Leone Psychiatric Teaching Hospital, Freetown, 8.46566°N 13.19381°W
- St John of God Hospital, Lunsar, 8.70381330999338°N 12.524891474759043°W

=== Traditional medicine ===
Traditional medicine forms part of the primary health care system in Sierra Leone. The traditional medicine programme, run by the Ministry of Health and Sanitation, has constructed a training school at Makeni, a healing centre at Kono and conducted workshops to promote co-operation between traditional medicine practitioners and orthodox medical workers. Members of the programme have also located and collected plants from throughout Sierra Leone used for medicine. The use of traditional medicine in Sierra Leone is common especially for the treatment of malaria and among hypertensive patients, pregnant women, infertile women lactating mothers, Ebola survivors and healthcare students.

== Non-governmental organizations ==
Some of the many NGOs that work with healthcare in Sierra Leone include:

- Partners In Health, which helped refurbish mental health services at the Sierra Leone Psychiatric Teaching Hospital
- Welbodi Partnership, which provides support for maternal and pediatric care in hospitals

== See also ==
- Health in Sierra Leone
