= Zachary J. Eisner =

Researcher

Zachary J. Eisner is the operations director of LFR International known for his work on the Lay First Responder Model, which received the Prince Michael International Road Safety Award in 2020.

Eisner has developed emergency medical services in Kenya, Sierra Leone, and Nigeria. He is an advisor to the Nigerian Federal Road Safety Corps. Eisner co-founded the First Responder Coalition of Sierra Leone.

In December 2020, Eisner's contributions to emergency services development in developing countries with LFR International were recognized with the Prince Michael International Road Safety Award.
