= Welbodi Partnership =

Medical charity in Sierra Leone

- Formation: 2007
- Purpose: Promote maternal health and pediatric healthcare
- Location: Sierra Leone
- Website: www.welbodipartnership.org

The Welbodi Partnership is a Sierra Leone and United Kingdom-registered charity that works exclusively in Sierra Leone, where it collaborates with official and non-official partners to support the provision of maternal and pediatric care. The charity was founded in 2007 by British entrepreneur Tom Cairnes along with Dr. Matthew Clark, a UK pediatrician who visited Sierra Leone as a medical student. As of 2024, Clark serves on the board of directors of Welbodi, along with Sia Lajaku-Williams, Sister Betty Sam, and Carole Green, who is the Chair. The name Welbodi is derived from the Krio word for “health”. Welbodi is based at the Ola During Children's Hospital (ODCH) and works closely with other healthcare organisations in Sierra Leone.

== Welbodi's goals and accomplishments ==
Child health statistics for Sierra Leone are among the worst in the world where nearly 1 in 5 children die before the age of five, mostly from preventable diseases like pneumonia, diarrhea and malaria. The charity's aim is to reduce child mortality in Sierra Leone by improving the quality of pediatric care. Welbodi seeks to contribute towards the achievement of one of the United Nations' Millennium Development Goals: to reduce child mortality by two-thirds by 2015.

Welbodi supports the training of medical and non-medical personnel at the hospital, collaborating with ODCH and the Government of Sierra Leone Ministry of Health and Sanitation to strengthen undergraduate and postgraduate training in pediatrics for both doctors and nurses. They also provide equipment and supplies to support the provision of healthcare and to ensure that training programmers can be delivered effectively.

In 2011, Welbodi was able to provide the hospital with a standby generator which provides power to life-saving medical equipment during Freetown's frequent electrical power cuts.

Welbodi is currently fundraising to provide the hospital with an x-ray machine and radiology department. Children who need an x-ray currently have to travel across Freetown, a journey which is not always possible if the child is seriously unwell. Welbodi is also committed to helping the hospital gain accreditation from the West African College of Physicians to become a training facility for specialist pediatricians. This would be the first training programme of its kind in Sierra Leone.

Welbodi has worked in partnership with ODCH, the Ministry of Health and Sanitation and local community leaders to establish the Sierra Leone Institute for Child Health (SLICH).

== Support from King's College London ==
King's College London supports Welbodi's objective to strengthen undergraduate and postgraduate training in pediatrics for doctors and nurses through the provision of staff expertise. This is part of the King's College Sierra Leone Partnership.

== See also ==
- Health in Sierra Leone
- Healthcare in Sierra Leone
