= Jocalyn Clark =

Canadian public health scientist

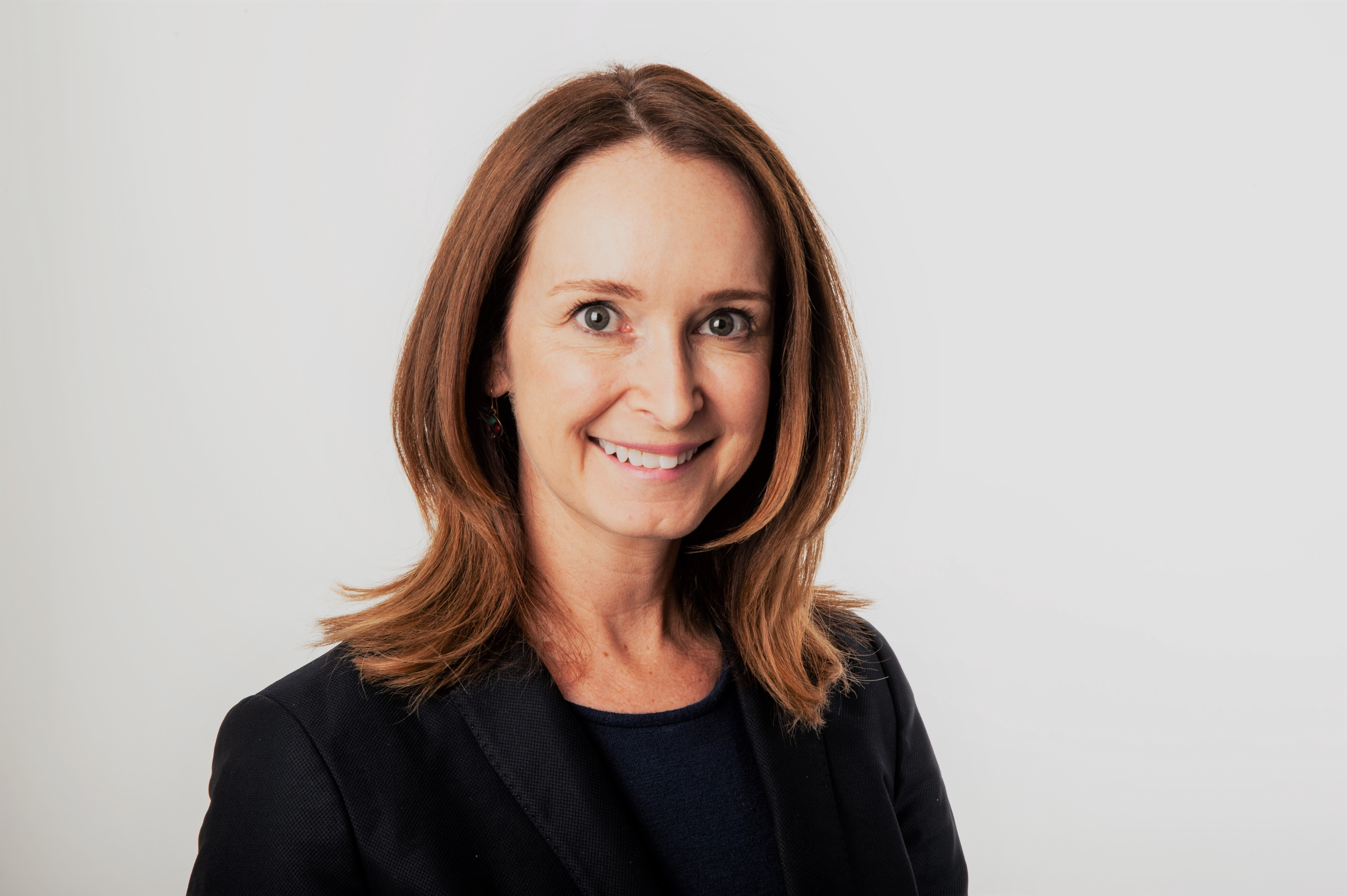
- Education: University of Toronto
- Scientific career
- Workplaces: The Lancet; ICDDR,B; The BMJ; PLOS Medicine

Jocalyn Clark is a Canadian public health scientist. She is the international editor of The BMJ, and has responsibility for strategy and internationalising the journal's content, contributors and coverage. From 2016 to 2022, Jocalyn was an executive editor at The Lancet, where she led the Commentary section, coordinated peer review, and edited and delivered collections of articles and commissions on topics such as maternal and child health, oral health, migration, end of life care and gender equity. She led the Lancet's project to advance women in science, medicine, and global health, #LancetWomen. She is also an adjunct professor of Medicine at the University of Toronto and an Honorary Associate Professor at the Institute for Global Health at UCL.

== Early life and education ==
Clark earned her bachelor's degree in biochemistry and microbiology. During her undergraduate degree she became interested in infectious disease, particularly conditions such as trypanosomiasis, HIV and neglected tropical diseases that affect people in the developing world. Clark recognised that the causes of these diseases were social rather than biological, which inspired her to pursue a career in public health. She has a Master's degree in public health sciences and earned her PhD in Public Health Science at the University of Toronto. Having been awarded a full doctoral fellowship from the Canadian Institutes of Health Research, where she was ranked the highest in the country for that year, her dissertation investigated the medicalisation of sexual assault and gender-equity in public health. Clark was offered a postdoctoral position at University of California, San Francisco, but chose to move to London UK to take up the post of editorial registrar at The BMJ.

== Research and career ==
Clark began her editing career at The BMJ, where she worked as an Assistant Editor from 2002 to 2007. She joined PLOS Medicine as a Senior Editor in 2008. Here she developed the magazine content and editorial policy. She was the first to write an editorial in a medical journal on the use of rape as a tool of war and about the problems with the food and beverage industry in health. Clark believes that PLOS are uniquely positioned to comment on global health issues as they are open-access and do not take money from the pharmaceutical industry.

As her interest in global health grew, Clark became keen to work in a developing country. Clark served as Executive Editor of the International Centre for Diarrhoeal Disease Research, Bangladesh (ICDDR,B) and its Journal of Health, Population and Nutrition and she also trained doctors in scientific writing and publication. Whilst in Dhaka Clark wrote for The BMJ, The Guardian and Grand Challenges Canada. She completed an academic writing residency at Lake Como. Here she investigated the over-medicalisation of global health at the Rockefeller Foundation Bellagio Center, and wrote a four part series outlining whether global health had become too medicalised, the medicalisation of mental health, the medicalisation of non-communicable diseases and the medicalisation of Universal Health Coverage campaigns.

In 2014 Clark was named as one of the Top 100 Women in Global Health. She examined the risks associated with predatory journals, particularly how they may impact scientists in the developing world. It was estimated that predatory journals earned $75 million in 2014. Clark joined The Lancet as Executive Editor in 2016. She commissioned and edited The Lancet Canada Series in 2018, which was a collection of scientific papers evaluating Canada's system of universal health care and its global leadership in health. It included commentaries from Jane Philpott and Justin Trudeau. She called for more action on the public health of indigenous populations.

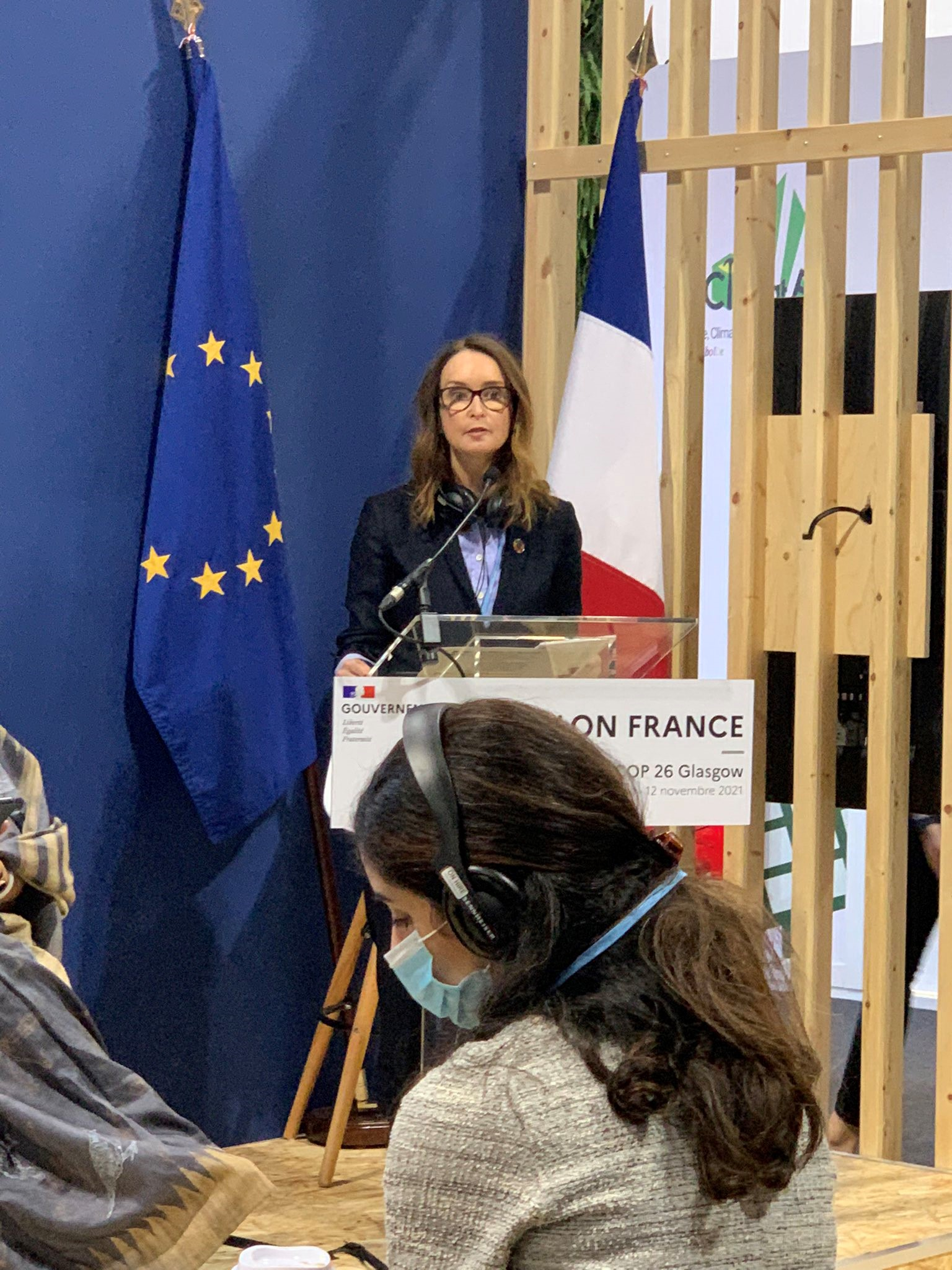
Dr Jocalyn Clark, COP26, Glasgow, 9 Nov 2021

Clark is committed to gender equality in science, whether that is in medical trials, research groups or scientific publishing. She founded the Canadian Women in Global Health initiative and list in 2018. The list was established to help conference organisers, journal editors, the media and funding bodies identify more diverse experts. In 2019 she led a theme issue of The Lancet that was focused on women in medicine. Whilst women outnumber men in the Lancet workforce, men are considerably more likely to review and publish papers. Clark said that there were over 300 submissions from more than 40 countries for the Lancet Women theme issue. She stated that, "The evidence is clear, women are disadvantaged within science, medicine and global health. The source of that disadvantage is gender bias, which is a core feature of the very systems that organise these three fields". #LancetWomen was launched in February 2019, after which The Lancet committed to re-assembling their editorial boards to improve gender balance. During Clark's tenure at The Lancet, the proportion of women (and colleagues from low or middle income countries) increased across editorial advisory boards, reviewers, and authors of commissioned content. She has questioned whether efforts toward gender equity will ever progress beyond institutional resistance and a pandemic backslide.

She was elected to the Royal College of Physicians of Edinburgh and the Canadian Academy of Health Sciences in 2019 in recognition of her leadership to advance global health and gender equity, as well as the visibility of the social contexts of health. Clark serves on the advisory boards of Global Health 50/50 and WomenLift Health, and is the Chair of the Governance Council of the Canadian Medical Association Journal. In 2023 she was a visiting researcher at The Brocher Foundation in Switzerland to examine the unintended harms of pandemic publishing, how covid-19 struck a blow to women's expertise, and equity for women in science. In addition to her editorial contributions, she has written over 160 scholarly publications that have been cited over 66,000 times, and has an h-index of 34.
