= LFR =

LFR can refer to:

- Lead-cooled fast reactor, a type of nuclear reactor
- LFR International, emergency medical service in Africa
  - Lay First Responder Model, a model of emergency assistance implemented by LFR International
- Leavine Family Racing
- Lincolnshire Fire and Rescue Service in England
- Louisville Division of Fire, US
- Low-frequency radio range, an early radio navigation system
- A US Navy hull classification symbol: Inshore fire support ship (LFR)
- Leafs Fan Reaction, an internet series by Steve Dangle
