= Global Alliance of NGOs for Road Safety =

Umbrella organization

- Region served: Global
- Fields: Road Traffic Safety
- Members: +200 member organizations
- Key people: Lotte Brondum
- Website: http://www.roadsafetyngos.org

The Global Alliance of NGOs for Road Safety is a collection of nongovernmental organizations (NGOs) that implement programs and lobby for road safety initiatives around the world. As an umbrella organization, it currently represents more than 200 member NGOs from 90-plus countries.

== History ==
In May 2009, the World Health Organization convened 70 NGOs from 40 countries in Brussels for the First Global Meeting of NGOs Advocating for Road Safety and Road Victims. The objective was to discuss how NGOs could collaborate to advance the global road safety agenda. The meeting generated what is now known as the “Brussels Declaration,” which described the concept and outline for a Decade of Action for Road Safety. In September, the WHO asked nine NGOs from the United Nations Road Safety Collaboration (UNRSC) to explore interest from NGOs in a platform that would facilitate information sharing. Exploratory conversations and surveys demonstrated that 89% of surveyed NGOs agreed a platform would be beneficial. In November, the Brussels Declaration was presented at the First Global Ministerial Conference on Road Safety in Moscow by NGOs.

In March of 2011, the WHO organized the second global meeting of NGOs advocating for Road Safety and Victims of road trauma, which was held in Washington, D.C. More than 100 individuals, representing more NGOs from 48 different countries attended the meeting, at which the platform for an alliance of NGOs for road safety was presented. In May of that year, the Decade of Action for Road Safety (2011-2020) was launched by the UN General Assembly.

In March 2012, the WHO formally established a steering committee of representative NGOs to launch the Global Alliance of NGOs for Road Safety, from which an advocacy guide for NGOs was co-produced with the WHO in April. A year later, the Alliance hosted the 3rd Global Meeting of NGOs for Road Safety and Road Victims in Antalya, Turkey. This time, nearly 100 individuals from organizations representing efforts from 50 different countries attended. During the first meeting hosted by the alliance, the first general assembly for member NGOs to vote on alliance bylaws and elect its board of directors was held. In September of 2013, the alliance introduced its 2014–2018 strategic plan, outlining its specific goals for membership growth and development.

In September of 2014, the alliance's board of directors established a permanent secretariat to serve as liaison to its member NGOs, while it became a member of the United Nations Road Safety Collaboration just a month later. Lotte Brondum was made the executive director, as the Global Alliance's first employee. Brondum had previously worked with the Danish government as an advisor on HIV/AIDS issues in Mozambique, Zimbabwe, and Vietnam; with Coca-Cola Sabco implementing an employer's health program, and as the Director of International Development at AIP Foundation. In December, the #SaveKidsLives campaign, guided in part by the Alliance, was launched by the UNRSC to gather signatures for the Child Declaration for Road Safety.

In March of 2015, the Alliance hosted its 4th Global Meeting of NGOs advocating for Road Safety and Road Victims in Marrakech, Morocco. Eight months later, the Alliance had coordinated the participation of more than 40 member NGOs at the 2nd Global High-Lebel Conference on Road Safety in Brasilia, Brazil. The Alliance announced its partnership with FedEx to launch the Alliance Empowerment Program for members during the Conference. In February 2016, the Alliance launched a newly-redesigned website with the aim to improve information sharing among its members and the road safety advocate community. In April, representatives from the Alliance were in attendance for the 22nd meeting of the United Nations Road Safety Collaboration taking place at the New York UNICEF headquarters.

In June, the Alliance launched a Seed Program Pilot with funding from FedEx, and in August, hosted the 2016 Alliance Advocate training course in Memphis with FedEx. In April of 2017, a 5th Global meeting of NGOs was held in Malaysia, during which the Malaysia Declaration was signed by members and the kickoff event for the 4th UN Global Road Safety Week was held. The month after, members of the Alliance took part in the UN Global Road Safety Week, advocating for improved road safety measures, and reached at least six million people. That August, the second cohort of Alliance Advocates graduated at the FedEx World Headquarters in Memphis, Tennessee.

In October off 2017, the Alliance launched a new action brief, called “Walking the Talk,” at the Every Journey, Every Child Conference.

In April of 2018, representatives from the Alliance were present at the launch of the UN Road Safety Trust Fund, representing civil society.

In 2019, the FedEx Road Safety Awards were created to be awarded to members of the Alliance that exemplify Alliance values and have demonstrated growth and exceptional dedication to road safety. Awards are given for commitment to road safety and/or post-crash response over a period of time, active involvement with the Alliance and having contributed positively to advancing the Alliance mission, and having demonstrated a willingness to learn.

== Criticism ==
In December of 2018, Adnan Hyder MD, PhD, MPH, a distinguished global health leader, published an article in The Lancet Public Health, criticizing the Alliance stating, “The presence of a global alliance for non-governmental organisations or a victims organisation in a country, though encouraging, is not enough, nor are these organisations sufficiently scaled, to ensure a public movement for safety in the countries that need it most.”

== Honors and awards ==
In December of 2017, the Alliance received the Prince Michael International Road Safety Award.

== Members ==
=== Africa and the Middle East ===
Kyrgyzstan:

- Kyrgyz Road Safety NGO

Tajikistan:

- Young generation of Tajikistan

Azerbaijan:

- "Hayat" İnternational Humanitarian Organisation
- The National Automobile Club of Azerbaijan - Azerbaycan Milli Avtomobil Klubu (AMAK)

Iran:

- Road Safety Supporters Society (RSSS)
- Road Safety Pioneers (RSP)

Pakistan:

- Centre for Development Innovation (CDI)

Lebanon:

- ASSOCIATION ZEINA HAUCH
- Kunhadi
- Roads For Life
- Adel Metni Foundation

Jordan:

- The Royal Health Awareness Society

Oman:

- Sustainability for Life

Egypt:

- Egyptian Society For Road Safety - ESRS
- The Nada Foundation for Safer Egyptian Roads

Tunisia:

- Les ambassadeurs de la sécurité routière

Algeria:

- Les Amis de la Route
- e-consumer protection association
- Tariq Essalama Bejaia

Morocco:

- Association M'zab Prévention Routière et Développement -AMPROUD

Mali:

- Action et Jeunesse pour le Développement - Sécurité Routière (AJD - Sécurité Routière)
- SIRABA LAKANA
- Association *Les Amis de la Route* du Mali

Niger:

- ONG FONDEÏ MA BORI

Senegal:

- laserinternational

Gambia:

- National Youth Parliament-The Gambia

Burkina Faso:

- ReJSER-BF

Guinea:

- OBSERMU

Sierra Leone:

- Roadsafe Salone

Liberia:

- Save Life Liberia Inc.

Côte d'Ivoire:

- Organisation des Jeunes Ivoiriens pour la Security Routiere (OJISER)

Ghana:

- Amend Road Safety Ghana
- CENTRE FOR ROAD SAFETY AND ACCOUNTABILITY –AFRICA

Togo:

- AVA-TOGO
- avr

Benin:

- ONG ALINAGNON

Nigeria:

- Sefety Beyond Borders
- TEMIDAYO OGAN CHILD SAFETY AND SUPPORT (TOCSS) FOUNDATION
- Road Accident Information & Rescue Organization
- Lifestyle Health Education and Safety Foundation
- PATVORA Initiative
- Highway Safety Initiative
- Kwapda'as Road Safety Demand (KRSD) Trust Fund
- Arrive Alive Road Safety Initiative
- ROAD ACCIDENT PREVENTION NETWORK CENTER
- GreenLight Initiative

Cameroon:

- SECUROUTE
- Cameroon Road Safety Foundation(CAROSAF)
- Association des Familles de Victimes des Accidents de la Circulation (AFVAC - CAMEROUN)
- cameroon association for the defence of victims of accident(CADVA)
- Association Des Personnes Préférées (amputées)

Ethiopia:

- Save The Nation Association-(SNA)

Uganda:

- Uganda Red Cross Mbarara
- Uganda Road Accident Reduction Network Organisation (URRENO)
- Road Safety Trust Uganda
- Road Safety Initiative - Uganda
- SAFE WAY RIGHT WAY
- HOPE FOR VICTIMS OF TRAFFIC ACCIDENTS (HOVITA)
- YES WE CAN ALLIANCE

Kenya:

- Chariots of Destiny Organization
- Pamoja Road Safety Initiative
- ASIRT Kenya
- Safedrive Africa Foundation (SDAF)
- INJURIES PREVENTION & INFORMATION CENTRE- KENYA (IPIC-K)
- RoadWise Network
- Smart Drivers Organization
- Usalama Watch Initiative
- Save the Children
- SAFE WAY RIGHT WAY

Rwanda:

- Healthy People Rwanda (HPR)

Tanzania:

- Helmet Vaccine Initiative Tanzania Foundation
- UWABA Dar es Salaam Cycling Community
- Amend

Zambia:

- Zambian Road Safety Trust

Mozambique:

- AMVIRO
- Amend Mozambique

Botswana:

- society of road safety ambassadors

Namibia:

- Private Sector Road Safety Forum (Namibia)

South Africa:

- South Africans Against Drunk Driving
- Childsafe South Africa

=== Europe ===
Cyprus:

- REACTION YOUTH FOR THE PREVENTION

Greece:

- EFTHITA RHODES
- YOU ARE WHAT U DO - KOSTAS KOUVIDIS
- MAKE ROADS SAFE HELLAS

Portugal:

- Associação de Cidadãos Auto-Mobilizados

Spain:

- Stop Accidentes
- P(A)T - PREVENCION DE ACCIDENTES DE TRAFICO
- Instituto Internacional de Ciencias Políticas
- AESLEME
- Federación Iberoamericana Asociaciones de victimas contra la violencia vial. FICVI
- Asociación Internacional de Profesionales para la Seguridad Vial (AIPSEV)
- OBSERVATORIO CRIMINOLÓGICO DE LA SEGURIDAD VIAL

France:

- FIA

Ireland:

- Irish Road Victims' Association

United Kingdom:

- Global New Car Assessment Programme
- FIA Foundation
- Eastern Alliance for Safe & Sustainable Transport (EASST)
- RoadSafe
- RoadPeace
- Brake
- Royal Society for the Prevention of Accidents (RoSPA)
- International Road Assessment Programme (iRAP)

Denmark:

- Dansk Fodgænger Forbund

Sweden:

- Kids Non-Profit Organization

Latvia:

- Auto-Moto Society of Latvia

Belarus:

- Belarusian Auto Moto Touring Club

Poland:

- The Association for Improving Safety of Road Traffic

Ukraine:

- Road Safety Support Foundation (Ukraine)
- Ukrainian Road Safety Association
- Lviv-safe city

Moldova:

- Automobile Club of Moldova (ACM)
- Road Safety Moldova
- ProtectMD Foundation

Romania:

- CCVR Romania
- ASOCIAÞIA SIGURANÞA AUTO

Kosovo:

- AMRKS

Bulgaria:

- Open Youth Institute for Research, Education and Development

Turkey:

- Turkish Traffic Safety Association
- International Police Association (IPA) Turkey

Armenia:

- National Road Safety Council (NRSC)

Georgia:

- Partnership For Road Safety
- Georgia Alliance for Safe Roads

Luxembourg:

- AVR Association nationale des Victimes de la Route

Netherlands:

- YOURS - Youth for Road Safety
- La Prévention Routière Internationale PRI
- Safe Crossings

Belgium:

- FEVR
- European Cyclists Federation
- Responsible Young Drivers
- Handicap International Federation
- European Alcohol Policy Alliance
- CITA - International Motor Vehicle Inspection Committee

=== North America ===
Canada:

- MADD Canada
- Canadian Association of Road Safety Professionals
- Parachute Leaders in Injury Prevention

United States of America:

- Amend
- ASIRT
- National Organizations for Youth Safety (NOYS)
- Safe Kids Worldwide
- Mothers Against Drunk Driving
- Institute for Transportation and Development Policy
- Trek Medics International
- Youth Service America (YSA)

Mexico:

- Movilidad y Desarrollo México
- Mexico Previene
- Victimas de Violencia Vial AC
- Fundación Tiempo para Vivir, A. C.
- NACE A.C. (No A Conducir Ebrio)
- Jovenes salvaguarda ac
- Instituto Profesional de Capacitación para el Transporte Público A.C.
- Movimiento de Activación Ciudadana

Dominican Republic:

- ACODOM, INC

=== North Asia ===
Kazakhstan:

- Road Safety Association of Kazakhstan

Russian Federation:

- Road Safety Russia

=== South America ===
Chile:

- Bicicultura
- Fundacion Emilia
- Movimiento contra el Exceso de velocidad Letal
- ONG NO CHAT

Costa Rica:

- Fundación S.O.S. Paz en las Carreteras
- ACONVIVIR

Venezuela:

- asoransito
- Asociación Civil Paz Activa

Colombia:

- Por la Via Por la Vida - Liga Contra la Violencia Vial
- FUNDACION IRM
- MEDITECH Foundation

Ecuador:

- FUNDACION CAVAT

Peru:

- Lima Cómo Vamos

Brazil:

- Fundação Thiago de Moraes Gonzaga
- CRIANÇA SEGURA SAFE KIDS BRASIL
- Observatório Nacional de Segurança Viária
- IECT - Instituto de Ètica e Comportamento no Transito

Argentina:

- Luchemos por la Vida - Asociación Civil
- Asociacion Madres del Dolor
- Conduciendo a Conciencia
- ADISIV
- A.C.T.I.V.V.A.S. ASOCIACION CIVIL CONTRA LA VIOLENCIA VIAL
- BIEN ARGENTINO
- TECPREMER
- MiNU Asociación Civil

Paraguay:

- afavivpy

Uruguay:

- Fundacion Gonzalo Rodriguez
- FUNDACION UNITRAN

=== South Asia ===
China:

- Safe Kids China

Korea:

- Safe Kids Korea

India:

- youth task force
- ArriveSAFE
- SAFE KIDS FOUNDATION
- Forum for Prevention of Road Accidents
- TRAX S. SOCIETY
- SaveLIFE Foundation
- PEOPLE'S TRUST JAIPUR
- Safe Road Foundation
- AVOID ACCIDENT
- Indian Federation of Road Safety
- THE ABILITY PEOPLE
- Sudheekshan foundation
- Indian Head Injury Foundation
- Safe Drive Save Life
- Women & Child Welfare Society
- United Way Mumbai
- Muskaan foundation for road safety
- Patiala Foundation
- National Safety Council - Maharashtra Chapter
- Shubham Soti Foundation

Nepal:

- Swatantrata Abhiyan Nepal
- Public Health Perspective Nepal (Janaswasthya Pariprekshya Nepal)
- Nepal Automobiles' Association

Bangladesh:

- BRAC
- Centre for Injury Prevention and Research, Bangladesh (CIPRB)
- Eakok Attomanobik Unnayan Sangstha
- Nirapad Sarak Chai (We Demand Safe Road)

Vietnam:

- AIP Foundation

Thailand:

- Child Safety Promotion and Injury Prevention Research Center
- Asia Injury Prevention Foundation

Cambodia:

- Cambodia Movement for Health
- Asia Injury Prevention Foundation
- Advocacy and Policy Institute

Malaysia:

- Safe Kids Malaysia

Indonesia:

- Road Safety Association Indonesia

Australia:

- Safer Australian Roads and Highways (SARAH)
- Australian Road Safety Foundation
- Little Blue Dinosaur Foundation

New Zealand:

- New Zealand Sleep Safety Ltd
- Safekids Aotearoa / New Zealand

Philippines:

- PROJECT C.A.R.E.S. (Community Activities Reaching to Everyone through Services) INC.
