= Bob John Hassan Koroma =

Siera Leonean Catholic prelate (born 1971)

The Most Reverend Bob John Hassan Koroma
- Bishop of Makeni, Sierra Leone
- Church: Catholic Church
- Archdiocese: Roman Catholic Archdiocese of Freetown
- See: Roman Catholic Diocese of Makeni
- Appointed: 11 February 2023
- Installed: 14 May 2023
- Predecessor: Natale Paganelli (Apostolic Administrator) (11 April 2012 - 14 May 2023)
- Successor: Incumbent

Orders
- Ordination: 25 April 1999 by Giorgio Biguzzi
- Consecration: 13 May 2023 by Walter Erbì
- Rank: Bishop

Personal details
- Born: Bob John Hassan Koroma; 17 November 1971 (age 54) Kamabai, Diocese of Makeni, Sierra Leone
- Motto: "UT UNUM SINT" (That they may be one)

Styles of Bob John Hassan Koroma
- Reference style: Your Lordship; The Most Reverend
- Spoken style: His Lordship
- Religious style: Bishop

Bob John Hassan Koroma (born 17 November 1971) is a Sierra Leonean Roman Catholic prelate who is the bishop of the Roman Catholic Diocese of Makeni in Sierra Leone since 11 February 2023. Before that, from 25 April 1999 until he was appointed bishop, he was a priest of the same Catholic diocese. Pope Francis appointed him bishop. He was consecrated on 13 May 2023 and was installed at Makeni on 14 May 2023.

== Background and education ==
Bob John Hassan Koroma was born on 17 November 1971 in Kamabai, in Makueni Diocese, in the Northern Province of Sierra Leone. He studied philosophy and Theology at seminary. He studied at the Pontifical Biblical Institute in Rome, graduating with a Licentiate in sacred scripture. He also holds a Doctorate in biblical theology from the Pontifical Urban University, also in Rome, Italy.

== Priest ==
On 25 April 1999, he was ordained a priest for the Catholic Diocese of Makeni by Giorgio Biguzzi, Bishop of Makeni. He served as priest until 11 February 2023.

While a priest, he served in various roles and locations including:

- Collaborator with Vatican Radio from 2005 until 2013.
- Professor of sacred scripture and dean of studies at Saint Paul's Major Seminary in Freetown from 2008 until 2014.
- Collaborator at Saint Catherine of Siena and Little Compton and at Saint Madeleine in Tiverton, Rhode Island, United States of America from 2005 until 2013.
- Parish priest of Immaculate Conception in Magburaka and professor at the diocesan University of Makeni in 2015.
- Vicar General of the diocese of Makeni from 2015 until 2023.
- Administrator of the Diocesan Cathedral of Makeni from 2016 until 2023.

== Bishop ==
On 11 February 2023, the Pope Francis appointed the Reverend Father Monsignor Bob John Hassan Koroma, of the clergy of Makeni, previously the diocesan Vicar General and administrator of the Diocesan Cathedral of Our Lady of Fatima, as the new bishop of the diocese of Makeni. He took over from Bishop Natale Paganelli who worked as the Apostolic Administrator of the diocese since 11 April 2012.

Monsignor Bob John Hassan Koroma was consecrated bishop on 13 May 2023, at Makeni, by Walter Erbì, Titular Archbishop of Nepeta assisted by Edward Tamba Charles, Archbishop of Freetown and Natale Paganelli, Titular Bishop of Gadiaufala and Apostolic Administrator Emeritus of Makeni. Bishop Koroma was installed at Makueni the next day, 14 May 2023.

== See also ==
- Catholic Church in Sierra Leone

== Succession table ==
Preceded by Natale Paganelli; Apostolic Administrator (11 April 2012 - 14 May 2023)	Bishop of Makeni (since 11 February 2023)	Succeeded by Incumbent
