= LFRS =

LFRS may refer to:

- Lancashire Fire and Rescue Service, north-west England
- Leicestershire Fire and Rescue Service, East Midlands of England
- Nantes Atlantique Airport, France (ICAO code: LFRS)

== See also ==
- LFR (disambiguation)
