= Makeni Teacher's College =

- Type: Public
- Established: 1964
- Affiliations: University of Sierra Leone
- Students: 402
- Location: Makeni, Sierra Leone
- Campus: Makeni campus

Makeni Teacher's College formerly St Augustine’s Teachers College is a two to three years public college located in Makeni, Bombali District, Sierra Leone. It was founded in 1964. The college trains prospective teachers for primary and junior secondary school levels (form 1-3). After successfully completing the programme, candidates qualify for the Teachers Certificate (TC) and the Higher Teachers Certificate (HTC). The college offers programmes in English studies, social studies, environmental science, agriculture and Mathematics education.

== Current programmes ==
- School of Community Health Services
- School of Social Sciences
- School of Agriculture
- School of Environmental Sciences
- School of Technology
- school of business management
- school of social studies
