= EFAR System Model =

Emergency First Aid Responder System Model

The Emergency First Aid Responder System Model, or EFAR System Model, was first published by Jared H. Sun and Lee A. Wallis in Emergency Medicine Journal in 2012, describing a system utilizing community members as first responders in low-resource settings to provide immediate basic care during medical emergencies until certified medical personnel arrive. Since its creation, it has been deployed across twenty-three municipalities in South Africa and has been adapted for use in Zambia.

== History ==
In low- and middle-income countries, trauma-related deaths disproportionately occur in the prehospital setting and are exacerbated by poorly resourced, poorly trained, or underdeveloped emergency medical services. With increasing globalization and subsequent industrialization, the global burden of injury affecting low-income countries had been projected to continue increasing disproportionately in developing countries. As many countries attempted to imitate high-income country emergency medical services infrastructure, these efforts were found to be financially unsustainable. Thus, a new strategy was needed to establish emergency medical systems in developing countries, and support their development into mature systems.

In 2009, Sun and Wallis began training community members as emergency first aid responders in Manenberg, South Africa to treat the high levels of violence-related trauma present there, as first responders had previously been suggested by the WHO as a possible alternative. They found community members were dispersed and able to arrive on scene sooner than professional emergency medical providers. Experiencing success, they realized that using community members who want to assist was a possibility worth exploring. The EFAR system model was then designed to integrate into pre-existing or support the development of formal emergency care systems, or even serve as the foundation upon which a new emergency care system could be built. However, the EFAR system model has primarily served to alleviate the inconsistent and unreliable response times of ambulances and other emergency services in the Cape Town area.

EFAR systems were implemented in two rural regions of Zambia in 2015, though no refinements were made to the course for the new setting.

In 2022, the EFAR system of South Africa joined the Global Prehospital Consortium.

== See also ==
- Emergency medicine
- First Responder
- Lay First Responder Model
