= Brima Koroma =

Sierra Leonean footballer

Personal information
- Full name: Ibrahim Koroma
- Date of birth: 8 July 1984 (age 42)
- Place of birth: Makeni, Sierra Leone
- Height: 1.74 m (5 ft 9 in)
- Position: Striker

Youth career
- 1990–2000: Bo Rangers

Senior career*
Years	Team	Apps	(Gls)
2001–2002	Essinge IK	35	(13)
2003	Enköpings SK	14	(0)
2004	Botafogo	0	(0)
2004	Enköpings SK	26	(7)
2005–2006	Kalmar FF	21	(1)
2007	AEL Limassol	0	(0)
2007–2008	Valsta Syrianska IK	26	(3)
2009	B36 Tórshavn	26	(7)
2010–2012	Anagennisi Dherynia		

International career
2003	Sierra Leone	1	(1)
- * Club domestic league appearances and goals

Brima Koroma (born 8 July 1984) is a former professional Sierra Leonean footballer.

== Career ==
Koroma played as a striker for Anagennisi Dherynia in the Cypriot First Division.

He has also played for Sierra Leone, scoring a goal in 2006 World Cup qualifying against Congo.

== Personal life ==
Koroma is from Makeni, in Bombali District, in the Northern Province of Sierra Leone.

== Career statistics ==
=== International ===
Scores and results list Sierra Leone's goal tally first, score column indicates score after each Koroma goal.

List of international goals scored by Brima Koroma
No.	Date	Venue	Opponent	Score	Result	Competition
1	16 November 2003	National Stadium, Freetown, Sierra Leone	Congo	1–0	1–1	2006 FIFA World Cup qualification
