= Princess Christian Maternity Hospital =

Princess Christian Maternity HospitalPrincess Christian Maternity Hospital

Geography
- Location: Freetown, Sierra Leone
- Coordinates: 8.490337°N 13.218968°W

Organisation
- Type: Specialist

Services
- Emergency department: Yes
- Speciality: Maternity hospital

Helipads
- Helipad: No

Links
- Lists: Hospitals in Sierra Leone

Princess Christian Maternity Hospital, also referred to as PCMH, is a hospital in Freetown, Sierra Leone nicknamed the 'Cottage Hospital'. In May 2006 Ahmad Tejan Kabbah re-opened the hospital alongside Connaught Hospital.

== History ==
The hospital was opened in 1892 and was founded by British Christian missionaries. It was named after Princess Helena of the United Kingdom (also known as Princess Christian), the fifth child of Queen Victoria, for her dedication and support of nursing. Until 2010, it was a fee-paying hospital. In 2011, in keeping with the introduction of universal healthcare in Sierra Leone, medical treatment became free at the point of delivery.

Princess Christian Maternity Hospital came under severe pressure during the 2014 Ebola virus epidemic in Sierra Leone. Scientific studies have shown that pregnant women are among the least likely to survive an onset of ebola, most likely because the mother's body lowers its immune response to prevent it rejecting the baby. In a previous outbreak in Zaire in 1995, 14 out of 15 pregnant women who contracted the disease died. With the country's health facilities completely overrun and already unable to cope with the patient numbers, the authorities decided to place pregnant women last in the queue for treatment, and also segregated them from other ebola patients, under the assumption that there was little that could be done to save them. Most of the pregnant ebola patients were sent to Princess Christian, but with health resources committed elsewhere, the hospital was severely neglected and conditions were so bad that the United Nations proposed closing the hospital altogether.
