= Diocese of Makeni =

Roman Catholic diocese in Sierra Leone

Coordinates: 8.8843°N 12.0402°W

Diocese of Makeni Dioecesis Makenensis

Location
- Country: Sierra Leone
- Metropolitan: North and North-West Province
- Headquarters: Makeni City

Statistics
- Area: 36,075 km^{2} (13,929 sq mi)
- Population: Total; Catholics: (as of 2004); 1,800,000; 38,000 (2.1%)

Information
- Sui iuris church: Latin Church
- Rite: Roman Rite
- Cathedral: Our Lady of Fatima, Makeni

Current leadership
- Pope: Leo XIV
- Bishop: Bob John Hassan Koroma
- Vicar General: Dominic Johnson

Map
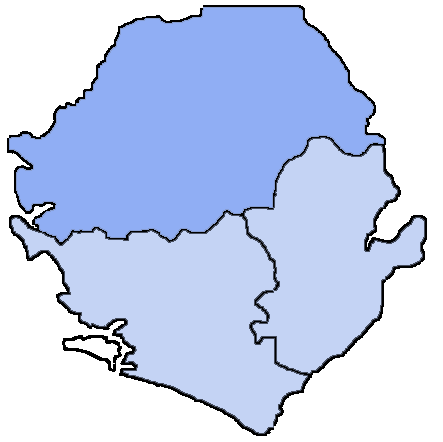

The Roman Catholic Diocese of Makeni (Latin: Makenen(sis)) is a diocese in the ecclesiastical province of Freetown in Sierra Leone. The cathedral is the Our Lady of Fatima Cathedral in Makeni.

In 2012 a majority of priests in the diocese disagreed with the appointment of bishop Henry Aruna, after which sede vacante was declared in April 2012.

== History ==
- April 3, 1952: Established as Apostolic Prefecture of Makeni from territory of the Diocese of Freetown and Bo
- February 24, 1962: Elevated to the status of a diocese

== Ordinaries ==
- Prefect Apostolic of Makeni (Latin Church)
  - Augusto Fermo Azzolini (1952-07-19 – 1962-02-24 see below)
- Bishops of Makeni (Latin Church)
  - Augusto Fermo Azzolini (see above 1962-02-24 – 1986-11-17)
  - Giorgio Biguzzi (1986-11-17 - 2012-01-07)
  - Henry Aruna (2012-01-07 - 2012-04-11), did not take possession
  - Sede vacante (2012)
    - Bishop Natale Paganelli (66) (Apostolic Administrator 2012 - 2023-02-11)
  - Bishop Bob John Hassan Koroma (since 11 February 2023)

== Apostolic Administrators ==
  - Bishop Natale Paganelli (11 April 2012 - 14 May 2023)

== See also ==
- Roman Catholicism in Sierra Leone

== Sources ==
- GCatholic.org
- Catholic Hierarchy
