= First Responder Coalition of Sierra Leone =

Official flag of the FRCSL

The First Responder Coalition of Sierra Leone (FRCSL) is a coalition of Sierra Leonean and international organizations dedicated to expanding prehospital emergency care and developing emergency medical services in Sierra Leone. It aims to address the high rates of injury and low rates of prehospital emergency care available in the country.

== History ==
The signed FRCSL constitution

Deployed to explore the creation of prehospital emergency care systems in Sierra Leone, LFR International initially proposed a coalition to national partners to address the lack of prehospital emergency care available. The five founding member organizations later came together in Makeni, a town in Bombali District in the Northern Province of Sierra Leone, to establish a formal coalition, which was called the "First Responder Coalition of Sierra Leone." The Coalition's official mission is to "facilitate the development of emergency first responder programs to alleviate the burden of traumatic injury in Sierra Leone."

The five founding members were the Sierra Leone Red Cross Society, LFR International, the University of Makeni, Agency for Rural Community Transformation (ARCT), and Holy Spirit Hospital. The Red Cross was the initial chairing organization of the coalition. Members wrote a constitution to officially establish the coalition, which was formally signed into existence on June 27, 2019. Its signatories were Kpawuru Sandy (Sierra Leone Red Cross Society), Peter G. Delaney (LFR International), Alfred Harun Thullah (ARCT), Patrick E. Turay (Holy Spirit Hospital), and Shaza Dous (University of Makeni).

The establishment of the FRCSL was seen as timely given the 72nd World Health Assembly's previous declaration that emergency care systems were essential to universal health coverage in May of the same year.

== Projects ==
With a mission of training first responders to treat casualties of accidents across the country and developing ambulatory emergency medical services across Sierra Leone, the Coalition began training first responders in the Northern Province of Sierra Leone, in Makeni, in June 2019. Coalition members trained more than 1,000 community members over a two-month period and equipped each responder with basic trauma management skills and materials.

Between July and December 2019, 4,529 lay first responders were trained in total in Makeni and surrounding areas in Bombali District. Knowledge improvement pre-/post-course for participants taking pre- and post-tests was 34.8% vs 78.3%, (p<0.0001), while median participant knowledge retention at 6 months, indicated by a test score remained high at 60.9%. By 9 months, median score had dropped to 43.5%. Comparatively, local instructor-led courses demonstrated median knowledge improvement pre- vs. post-course was 30.4 percentage points (21.7% vs 52.2%, p<0.0001). Lay first responders trained by the FRCSL went on to treat 1,850 patients in the following six months, and used their skills in bleeding control most often in 61.2% of encounters. The most common patient encountered were young adult males (36.8%), while 48.7% of injury encounters were due to motorcycle accidents.

== Members ==
- Sierra Leone Red Cross Society
- LFR International
- University of Makeni
- Agency for Rural Community Transformation (ARCT)
- Holy Spirit Hospital

== See also ==
- Health in Sierra Leone
