= University of Makeni =

Sierra Leonean Catholic university

Coordinates: 8.8874°N 12.0561°W

- Type: Private
- Established: October 8, 2005
- Affiliations: Catholic Diocese of Makeni
- President: Bishop Natalio
- Location: Makeni, Sierra Leone
- Campus: Urban
- Website: www.unimak.edu.sl

University of Makeni (formerly known as the Fatima Institute and often known as UNIMAK) is a private Catholic university located in Makeni, Sierra Leone.

== History ==
It was founded as the Fatima Institute on October 8, 2005, by the Emeritus of the Roman Catholic Diocese of Makeni led by Reverend George Biguzzi (born 1936, Italy).

In 2011, along with City of Rest and the Community Association for Psychosocial Services (CAPS), UNIMAK became a founding member of the Mental Health Coalition (MHC) of Sierra Leone. Specializing in mental health service provision, academia, and advocacy, the consortium of organizations has been at the forefront of calls for reform of the mental health sector in Sierra Leone.

Ebola restrictions forced a temporary closure of the University of Makeni between 2014 and 2016.

In 2018, UNIMAK created an additional campus in the Koinadugu District of Sierra Leone. The campus is located in Kabala Town and UNIMAK is the first University to have begun operations in the district. In 2018, the university's application fees were eliminated for application forms as part of an initiative championed by President Julius Maada Bio to improve access to higher education for young people.

In 2019, the university became a founding member of the First Responder Coalition of Sierra Leone (FRCSL), with the Sierra Leone Red Cross Society, LFR International, the Holy Spirit Hospital, and Agency for Rural Community Transformation (ARCT). The Coalition's mission was to "facilitate the development of emergency first responder programs to alleviate the burden of traumatic injury in Sierra Leone."

== Governance ==
The university is privately owned by the Emeritus of the Catholic Diocese of Makeni and is the first private university in the country owned by the Catholic Mission. It is also governed by members of the Makeni University Governing Council.

== Programs ==
As a research-oriented university, there is a large breadth to the research being conducted at UNIMAK.

=== Public health ===
Representatives from the University of Makeni and Makerere University in Uganda met with academics from the School of Public Health at the Imperial College London to discuss building institutional capacities to provide public health education.

==== Ebola ====
In 2015, during the latter stages of the Ebola crisis outbreak, researchers from the University of Cambridge and Wellcome Trust Sanger Institute studying unconventional transmission of Ebola by sequencing the virus in real-time initially constructed temporary genome sequencing facilities to provide in-country sequencing capabilities to process patient samples from Makeni. Since the end of the crisis, the facilities have since been moved to the university, where they have formed the UNIMAK Infectious Disease Research Laboratory. The laboratory provides training for local scientists and students, crucial to sequencing and managing continued Ebola cases in Makeni without international collaborators present.

UNIMAK has been a leader in the PREDICT Ebola Host Project, as one of two Sierra Leonean institutions involved in the project (the other being Njala University). The PREDCIT project is a USAID-funded project headquartered at the UC-Davis One Health Institute. Subsequent to the Ebola Crisis, two groups began searching for hemorrhagic disease reservoirs in West Africa to preempt future crises. One group was led by the CDC and Njala University, while the other was led by UC-Davis and UNIMAK. As a result of the project, scientists were able to discover an Ebola virus species (Marburg Virus) in a host (fruit-eating bats) prior to detection in an infected human or sick animal for the first time ever.

=== Special needs educators program ===
UNIMAK is currently the only university in Sierra Leone to offer special needs teacher training. The absence of special needs teachers in Sierra Leone to educate disabled children has become a priority for the Ministry of Education, having assured the government that it is championing policy for the expansion of these programs in Parliament based on UNIMAK's programs.
