= St John of God Hospital Sierra Leone =

Hospital in Lunsar, Sierra Leone

St John of God Hospital
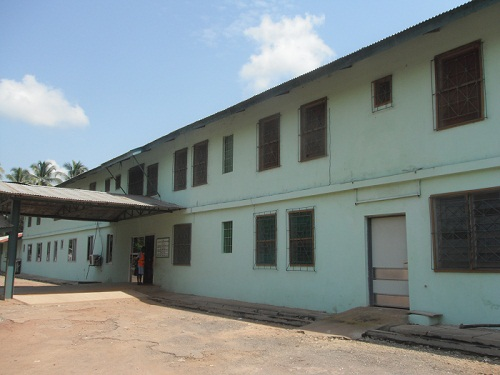
- Main entrance

Geography
- Location: Mabesseneh, Lunsar, Sierra Leone
- Coordinates: 8.7035°N 12.5250°W

Organisation
- Type: District

Services
- Emergency department: Yes
- Beds: 100

History
- Founded: 1964

Links
- Website: www.stjohnofgodhospital.net
- Lists: Hospitals in Sierra Leone

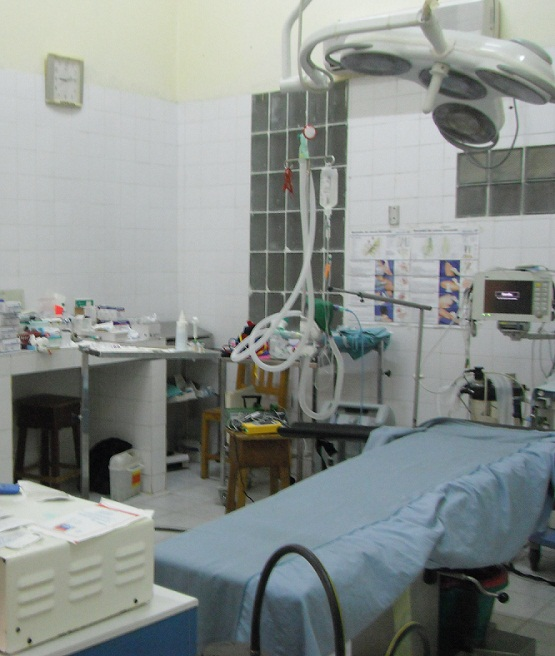
One of two theatres at St John of God Hospital

St. John of God Catholic Hospital, also known as Mabessaneh Hospital, is a hospital located in Mabesseneh, Lunsar, Sierra Leone. It is run by the Brothers Hospitallers of St. John of God, an international Catholic organisation.

It is a non-denominational hospital with several departments, some of which are a common part of healthcare in Sierra Leone, such as the Outpatient, Paediatric, Medical and Maternity departments. Others, such as Emergency, Surgery, Pharmacy and Microbiology, are not often found in the provinces, outside the capital.

The hospital has several links to European organisations. It is the only Sierra Leonean hospital outside of the capital Freetown which has a microbiological department run by the German NGO GLOBOLAB e.V. It is twinned with Hospital Sant Joan de Déu Barcelona.

The hospital has both a medical director and administrative director.

== See also ==
- 2014 Ebola virus epidemic in Sierra Leone
