= Red Cross of Chad =

Humanitarian organization in Chad

- Croix-Rouge du Tchad
- Founded: 1983
- Type: Non-profit organisation
- Purpose: Humanitarian Aid
- Location: Chad
- Affiliations: International Committee of the Red Cross; International Federation of Red Cross and Red Crescent Societies

The Red Cross of Chad (French: Croix-Rouge du Tchad, Arabic: الصليب الأحمر التشادي, romanized: al-Ṣalīb al-Aḥmar al-Tshādī) was founded in 1983. It has its headquarters in N’Djamena, Chad.

In 2018, CRC trainers collaborated with international researchers from LFR International to create a lay first responder program in Am Timan. Investigators trained local motorcycle taxi drivers to provide first aid and transport. Over 12 months, first responders demonstrated a cost-effective prehospital emergency care alternative for rural African settings.
