= Bomberos Voluntarios de Guatemala =

Guatemalan volunteer firefighting organization

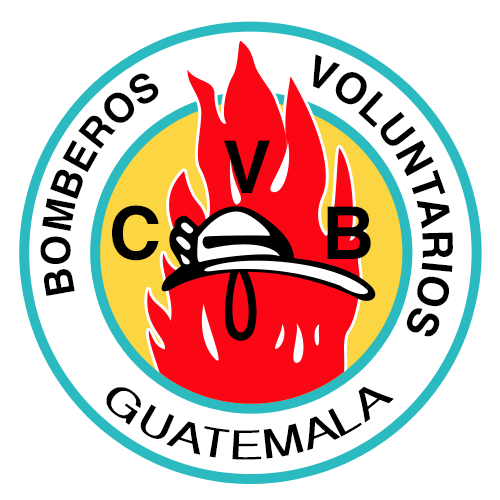
- Seal of the CVB

Operational area
- Country: Guatemala

Agency overview
- Established: August 16, 1951; 74 years ago

Website
- Official website

The Bomberos Voluntarios de Guatemala (Full name in Spanish: Cuerpo de Bomberos Voluntarios de Guatemala, "CVB") is an independent agency partially funded by the Guatemalan Ministry of the Interior that is headquartered in Guatemala City, Guatemala Department, and has fire companies in each of the 22 departments that constitute Guatemala. It is one of three major firefighting organizations in the country, the others being the Bomberos Municipales (serving Guatemala City) and the Asociación Nacional de Bomberos Municipales Departamentales (ASONBOMD), which serves city fire departments outside Guatemala City.

There is some temptation to equate the organizations to their U.S. counterparts, but all three organizations have both career, professional firefighters (called "permanentes") as well as volunteers to augment their paid staff. Most paid Guatemalan firefighters make the minimum wage, or the equivalent of US$350 to US$400 a month. They work a 24 hour on, 24 hour off schedule. In municipalities where companies from two organizations both exist, they compete for public support and funding. In Guatemala City, the CBM and CVB companies have occasionally come to blows over jurisdictional issues.

The agency's mandate is to prevent and fight fires; aid people and property in the case of fires, accidents, disasters, public calamities; promote education and prevention campaigns for accident avoidance; review and issue security certificates in matters of its competence; provide the collaboration requested by the state and those in need.

There are 134 CVB fire companies throughout Guatemala, comprising about half of all the fire companies in the country. In addition to the contributions from the paid staff, volunteer firefighters are necessary to respond to the volume of accidents in Guatemala, and so most volunteers make a space in their schedules to serve others by taking night or weekend shifts. In 2017, CVB's 5,100 bomberos (of which 4,414 work ad honorem) provided help in 922,668 service incidents to the Guatemalan people. The current budget for the Bomberos Voluntarios de Guatemala is 80,000,000 quetzales (10.44 million USD).

== History ==
The Bomberos Voluntarios de Guatemala were founded in 1951 after a major fire destroyed much of Zone 1 in Guatemala City. Seeing that the city did not have the resources to combat large fires, the Chilean ambassador to Guatemala, Rodolfo González Allendes, partnered with Guatemala City residents to form a fire department. The organization was officially formed on August 16, 1951, which is the day when members celebrate CVB's founding each year.

They celebrated their 67th anniversary with a parade in Guatemala City on August 15, 2018.

Each year, CVB go to Congress to ask for a budgetary increase, as the current funds currently available are insufficient to meet the major burden of emergencies across Guatemala, petitioning the government for a 25% increase in funding (additional 20 million quetzales) in 2018. As a result, Bomberos Voluntarios often rely upon support from private institutions or international NGOs, like after the 2018 Volcán de Fuego eruption. LFR International worked with CVB in 2019 in Chimaltenango, Escuintla, and Sacatepéquez departments.

== See also ==
- Volunteer fire department for an overview of similar systems across the world.
