= United Nations Road Safety Collaboration =

The United Nations Road Safety Collaboration (UNRSC) is an informal consultative mechanism whose members are committed to road safety efforts and in particular to the implementation of the recommendations of the World report on road traffic injury prevention.

== History ==
Following the dedication of World Health Day in April 2004 to the issue of road safety and the launch of the World report on road traffic injury prevention on that day, the United Nations General Assembly (through UN resolution 58/289 ) invited the World Health Organization (WHO), working in collaboration with the United Nations regional commissions, to act as the coordinator of global road safety issues. This request was endorsed by the World Health Assembly in May 2004 and resulted in the formulation of the United Nations Road Safety Collaboration (UNRSC) later in October 2004.

== Membership ==
Currently there are 70 full members of the UNRSC including United Nations and associated specialized agencies, governments, foundations and academic institutes, road safety nongovernmental organizations and private companies.

== Activities ==
The major focus of the Collaboration is on raising awareness of the issue around the world, through events such as the 1st UN Global Road Safety Week in 2007; World Day of Remembrance for Road Traffic Victims celebrated on the 3rd Sunday in November every year and the First Global Ministerial Conference on Road Safety as well as by providing technical support to countries and guidelines on best practice. Members of the UNRSC have published guidance on how to set up and monitor programmes around helmet wearing, drinking and driving, speed management, seat-belt and child restraint usage as well as how to set up and maintain optimal road safety data systems and road safety management systems.

== The Decade of Action for Road Safety ==
The UNRSC was instrumental in supporting the planning for and adoption of the first ever Decade of Action for Road Safety (2011–2020). The Decade was called for by a UN General Assembly resolution in 2010. WHO and the UN regional commissions, with assistance from the UNRSC, developed a global Plan of Action for the Decade as a guiding document to Member States and organizations around the world wishing to contribute to actions to reduce the carnage of road traffic crashes, deaths and injuries. Members of the UNRSC will work towards the goal of the Decade which is to save millions of lives by promoting and implementing good practices in five main areas, viz. road safety management, safer roads and mobility, safer vehicles, safer road users and the post-crash response.
