= Bradley P. Stoner =

American anthropologist

- Born: December 24, 1959 (age 66); Indianapolis, Indiana USA
- Education: Harvard University (AB) (Biological Anthropology); McGill University (MA) (Medical Anthropology); Indiana University (MA) (Bioanthropology); Indiana University (MD); Indiana University (PhD) (Anthropology)
- Occupations: Academic Physician; Anthropologist
- Years active: 1988–present
- Medical career
- Field: Internal Medicine; Infectious Diseases
- Institutions: Washington University in St. Louis
- Research: Sexually Transmitted Diseases
- Website: https://artsci.wustl.edu/faculty-staff/bradley-stoner

Bradley P. Stoner (born December 24, 1959) is an American sociocultural anthropologist and Head of the Department of Public Health Sciences at Queen's University. He is the former president of the American Sexually Transmitted Diseases Association and is regarded as an expert on the study of sexually transmitted infections.

== Education ==
Stoner graduated magna cum laude in anthropology from Harvard University in 1981 with an A.B. having studied biological anthropology. He then pursued master's degrees in medical anthropology and bioanthropology from McGill University on the William Lyon Mackenzie King Scholarship and Indiana University, respectively. He then attended Indiana University for medical school, earning his MD in 1987 and his PhD in anthropology in 1989. In 1987, he spent a year in Peru as a Fulbright Scholar conducting field research. His dissertation was titled, "Health Care Delivery and Health Resource Utilization in a Highland Andean Community of Southern Peru."

Stoner began his postgraduate medical training in internal medicine at Duke University in 1988. Graduating three years later, he completed a senior research fellowship in infectious diseases at the University of Washington between 1991 and 1994.

== Career ==
While at the University of Washington for his senior research fellowship, Stoner worked as a research associate in the Department of Anthropology. In 1994, he also served as an acting instructor in the Division of Allergy and Infectious Diseases at the University of Washington School of Medicine.

In 1995, upon completion of his research fellowship, Stoner moved to St. Louis to hold a dual assistant professorships in the Division of Infectious Diseases in Department of Internal Medicine at the Washington University School of Medicine and Department of Anthropology in the Washington University in St. Louis Faculty of Arts and Sciences. In 2001, he was awarded a dual associate professorship in the same departments. In 1995, he also became the medical director of the St. Louis STD/HIV Prevention Training Center. From 1995 to 2006, Stoner served as Chief of STD Services for the St. Louis County Department of Health. In 2019, he was named co-director of the Midwest Center for Capacity Building Assistance for HIV Prevention.

Between 2004 and 2005, Stoner worked at the World Health Organization in Geneva as a visiting medical officer in the Department of HIV and the Department of Reproductive Health and Research.

From 2017 to 2021, Stoner served first as a Member, and then as co-chair, of the Centers for Disease Control and Prevention (CDC) and Health Resources and Services Administration (HRSA) Advisory Committee on HIV, Viral Hepatitis, and STD Prevention and Treatment (CHAC).

In May 2020, while an associate professor of medicine and anthropology at Washington University School of Medicine and Washington University in St. Louis, Stoner was recruited by Queen's University and appointed as Professor and Head of the Department of Public Health Sciences for the Faculty of Health Sciences, with cross-appointment as Professor of Medicine (Division of Infectious Diseases). His appointment became official on October 1, 2020.

In June 2024, Dr. Bradley P. Stoner was selected to be the director of the division of STD Prevention at the Center for Disease Control.

== Research ==
Stoner has research interests in the comparative epidemiology of sexually transmitted infections, the social formation of sickness and health, and medical decision-making and health care utilization. He also conducts research in the United States and Peru on the sociocultural aspects of STD control, specifically into the analysis of sex partner networks, and patient perception of symptoms and subsequent health-seeking responses. He uses anthropology-based ethnographic approaches in his research to address STD/HIV transmission, specifically advances in epidemiology and mathematical modeling.

== Honors and awards ==
In 1985, Stoner was awarded the W.H.R. Rivers Student Prize from the Society for Medical Anthropology. In 1987, he was the recipient of a Fulbright Scholarship for work he conducted in Peru. In 1991, Stoner was awarded a Senior Research Fellowship from the National Institutes of Health.

In 2012, Stoner was elected president of American Sexually Transmitted Diseases Association for a two-year term. During his presidency, Stoner led the changing of the name of the association's lifetime achievement award from the "Thomas Parran Award" due to Parran's association with the notorious Tuskegee syphilis experiment and Guatemala syphilis experiment in the 1930s and 1940s as Surgeon General of the United States.

In 2022, the Department of Anthropology at Washington University, St. Louis, established the Bradley P. Stoner award for excellence in medical anthropology. This recognized the enormous success of the Medicine and Society program he developed.
