= Masanga Hospital =

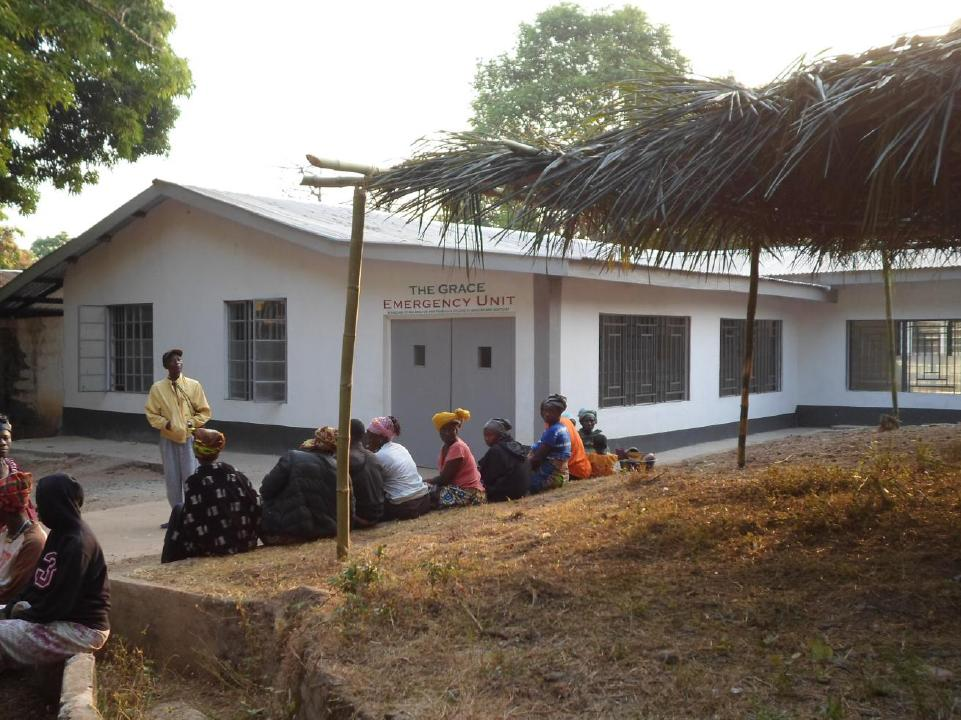
- The Emergency Admissions Unit at Masanga Hospital

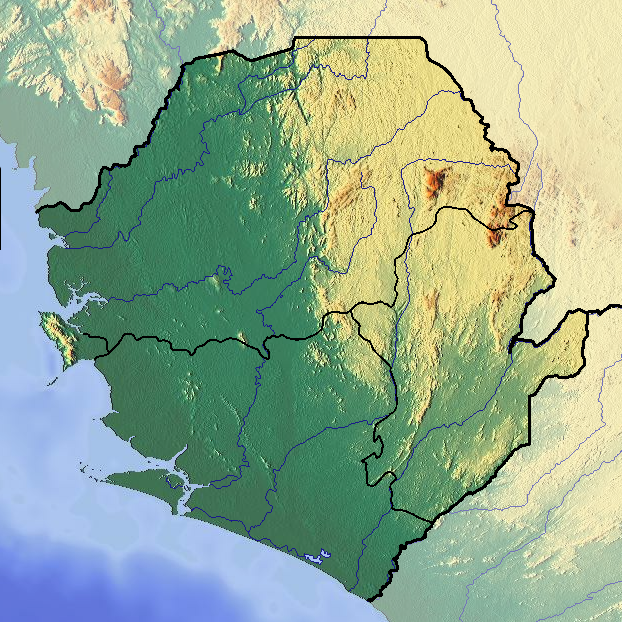
- The location of Masanga Hospital in Sierra Leone, West Africa

Geography
- Location: Masanga, Tonkolili District, Northern Province, Sierra Leone
- Coordinates: 8.749249°N 11.837149°W

Organisation
- Type: District
- Affiliated university: University of Plymouth
- Patron: MasangaDK, MasangaUK

Services
- Emergency department: Yes
- Beds: 100

Helipads
- Helipad: Yes

Links
- Website: http://www.masangahospital.org

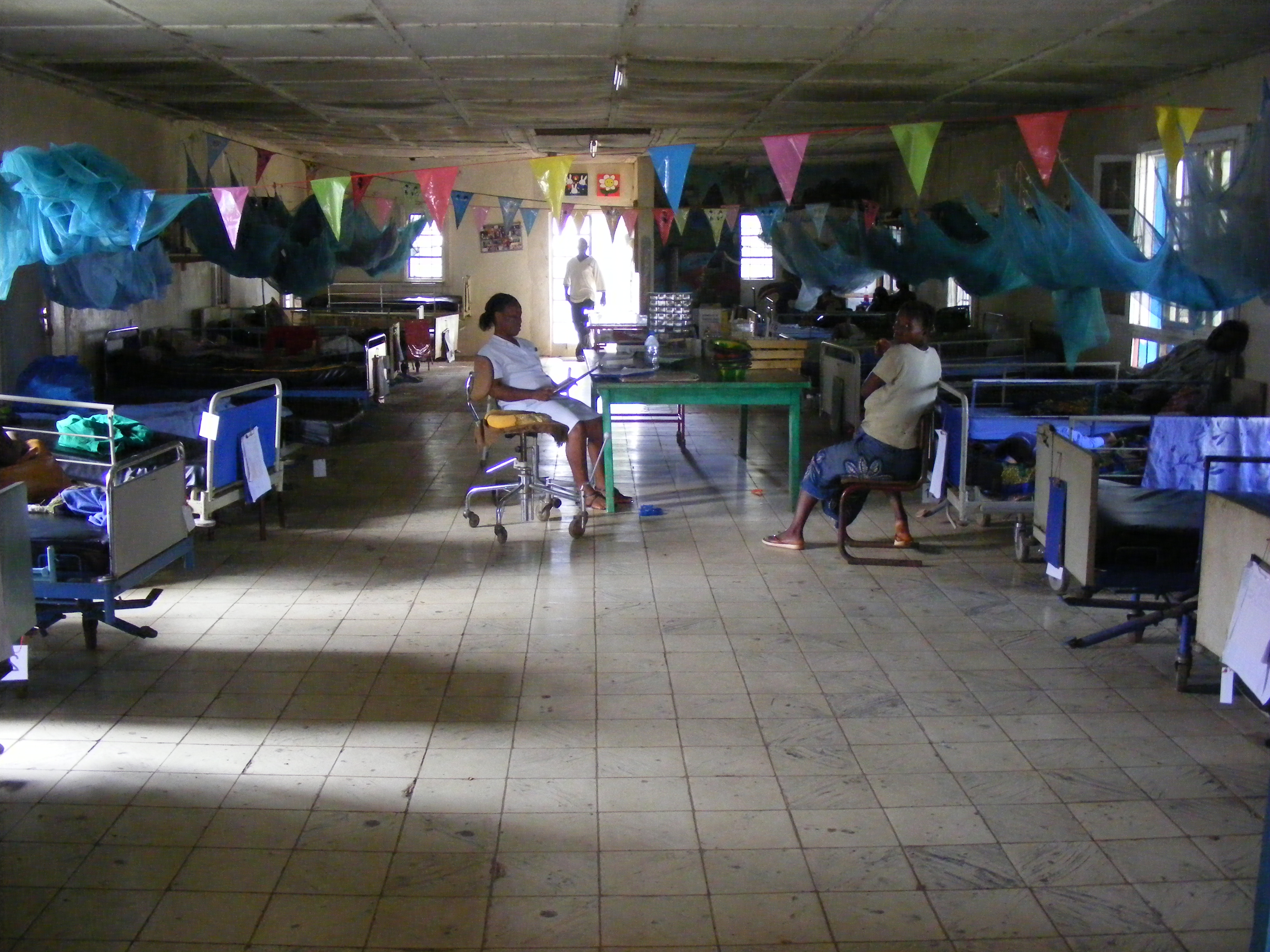
The paediatric ward at Masanga Hospital

Masanga Hospital or Masanga Leprosy Hospital is an NGO-supported government hospital that provides healthcare in paediatrics, maternity, general medicine and surgery. It is located in Tonkolili district, Northern Province, Sierra Leone, West Africa. The hospital was ransacked and used as a rebel stronghold during the Sierra Leone Civil War, but having reopened in 2006 it is now a functioning rural hospital once more. The hospital is run by a partnership between several European charitable organisations: Masanga UK, Sierra Leonean Adventists Abroad (SLAA), Masanga Netherlands and Masanga Denmark . Though in the long-term the hospital aims to be fully government-funded, presently it currently subsists on charitable donations. Free healthcare is offered to under-fives and pregnant women, and also to locals of limited means.

== Education ==
Masanga Hospital is involved in capacity-building by serving as the primary rotation centre for the Surgical training programme of CapaCare and by collaborating closely with the Tonkolili District College of Health Sciences.

== See also ==
- 2014 Ebola virus epidemic in Sierra Leone
