= LFR International =

International nonprofit organization

- Founders: Peter G. Delaney; Zachary J. Eisner
- Founded at: Los Angeles, California
- Type: Nonprofit; Non-governmental organization
- Tax ID no.: 83-3568251
- Legal status: 501(c)(3)
- Headquarters: Makeni, Sierra Leone
- Region served: Sub-Saharan Africa
- Fields: Emergency medical services development in LMICs
- Volunteers: 5,393 LFRs
- Award: Prince Michael International Road Safety Award
- Website: www.lfrinternational.org

LFR International (Lay First Responders) is an American international nonprofit organization focused on prehospital emergency medical research and emergency medical services development in sub-Saharan Africa. LFR launches sustainable prehospital emergency care programs in resource-limited settings of low-income countries without formal emergency medical services by collaborating with local governments and stakeholders to train lay first responders.

== History ==
More than 5,000 pre-existing transportation providers have been trained as lay first responders by LFR since 2016 to care for road traffic injuries and affordably scale up prehospital emergency care in resource-limited African settings.

LFR's model of locally-informed rapid emergency care deployment has been launched and studied by researchers in Uganda, Chad, Guatemala, and Sierra Leone. LFR was a founding organization of the First Responder Coalition of Sierra Leone in 2019 to expand prehospital emergency care and develop emergency medical services in Sierra Leone. LFR launched trainings with the Coalition in Makeni.

== Locations ==
=== Uganda ===
In 2016, Delaney launched an early iteration of what would eventually become the LFR model with the Uganda Red Cross Society in Iganga, Uganda. A lay first responder program of 154 motorcycle taxi responders was created to explore its capacity to provide prehospital emergency care for victims of road traffic injury in a municipality of 100,000 people. Encountering nearly 10% mortality, first responders assisted 250 victims in the first few months (83% of which were road traffic injury-related) and utilized bleeding control skills in over half of encounters.

Three years later in 2019, LFR investigators explored the social and financial implications of first responder trainings for initial participants. Though the World Health Organization had recommended training laypeople as the first step toward developing formal emergency medical services since 2004, there had previously been no investigations of the effects of trainings for laypeople. As the first to do so, LFR researchers found 75% of initial participants continued to voluntarily participate and described various apparent benefits to training, namely in an increase in social stature and income, in Emergency Medicine Journal.

In 2022, LFR returned to Uganda to establish an LFR program in Mukono District with Vision for Trauma Care in Africa (VTCA), a Ugandan NGO, and conduct a pilot implementation of an advanced medical and obstetric curriculum.

=== Chad ===
In 2018, LFR collaborated with trainers from the Red Cross of Chad to develop a lay first responder program in Am Timan, located in the rural Salamat Region, which had previously claimed the title of "poorest region" globally as measured by a multidimensional poverty index by the World Bank and International Monetary Fund. Under extreme resource limitations, an LFR program was launched by training 108 motorcycle taxi drivers to provide care for 36,000 people. Curriculum efficacy was evaluated using pre- and post-course tests, which demonstrated significant knowledge acquisition in participants.

In 2019, during follow-up interviews with initial participants after 12 months of providing emergency care, trainees reported sustained voluntary participation due the ability to care for the injured, new knowledge/skills, and the resultant gain in social stature and customer acquisition. Findings suggested LFR programs appear feasible and cost-effective in rural, resource-limited sub-Saharan African settings.

=== Guatemala ===
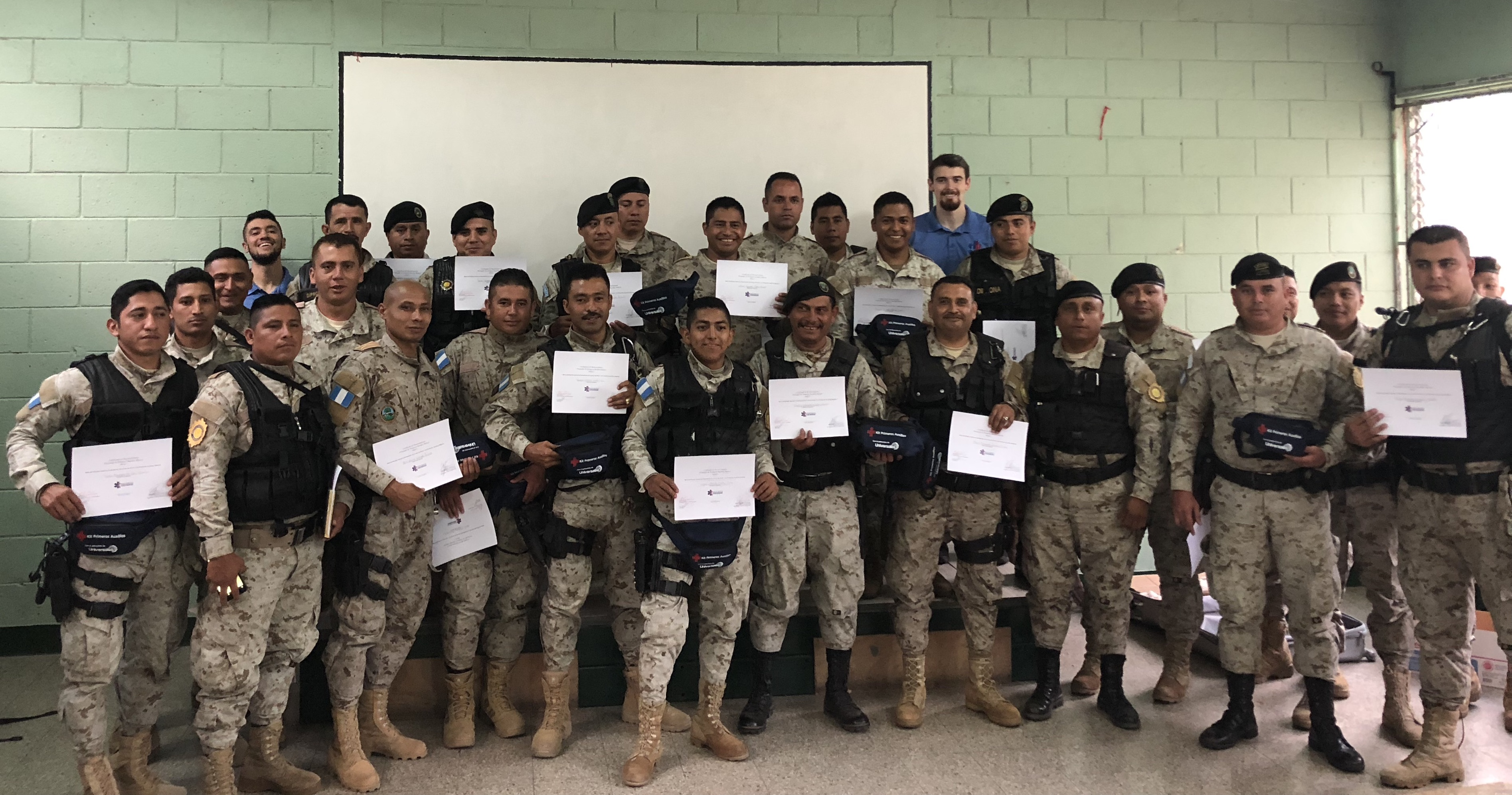
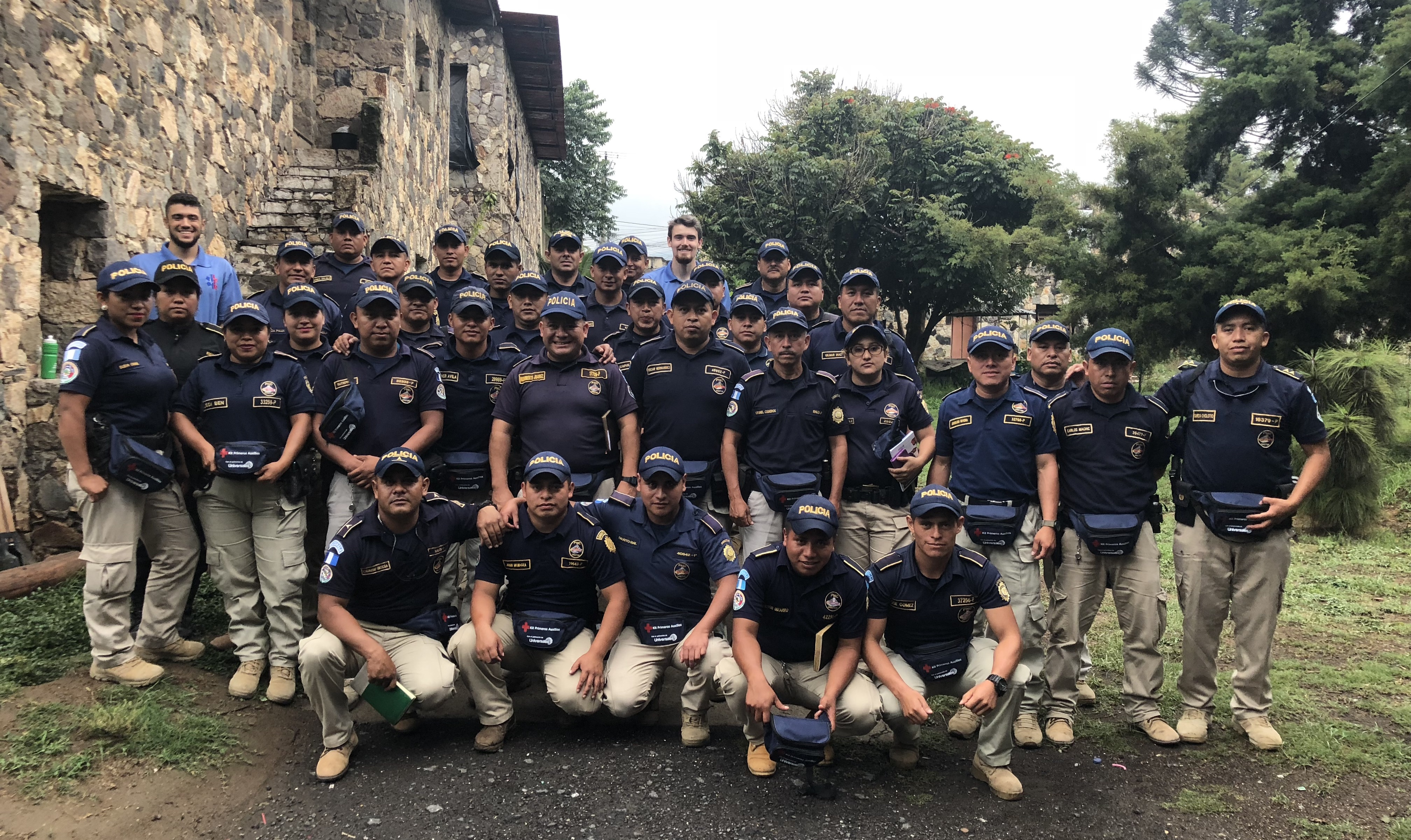
Prehospital trauma management training with DIFEP (Division of Special Police Forces) and PNC (Policia Nacional Civil) in Guatemala, 2019

In 2019, LFR deployed to Guatemala to investigate the development of first responder programs in a middle-income, Central American setting. LFR worked with affiliates of the Guatemalan Ministry of the Interior to train hundreds of members of the Policia Nacional Civil and CVB across the Escuintla, Sacatepéquez, and Chimaltenango departments in prehospital trauma management. A study conducted alongside the trainings found a single-day, five-hour training course effectively trained participants to provide effective prehospital emergency care.

=== Sierra Leone ===
In 2019, LFR was a co-founding member of the First Responder Coalition of Sierra Leone (FRCSL) with the Sierra Leone Red Cross Society, Agency for Rural Community Transformation, the Holy Spirit Hospital of Makeni, and the University of Makeni, its national partners. With the launch of the coalition, the FRCSL committed to training more than 1,000 community members in Makeni as LFRs. Between July and December 2019, 4,529 LFRs were trained by local LFR instructors. LFRs were later found to have treated 1,850 patients over the following six months, demonstrating significant emergency care knowledge improvement and retention in LFR participants.

Over a 14-month period, impact was assessed using the Prehospital Emergency Trauma Care Assessment Tool (PETCAT), a novel survey instrument LFR designed and administered to first-line hospital-based healthcare providers, to independently assess the frequency and quality of prehospital intervention by LFRs. Change in emergency care was controlled for by using a difference-in-differences approach and comparing change in Makeni, where the intervention had been launched, to Kenema, a control city 125 miles away without an LFR program. While controlling for secular trends, prehospital care in Makeni was demonstrated to have improved significantly over the 14-month study period, while also validating PETCAT as a robust tool for independent EMS quality assessment in resource-limited settings.

=== Nigeria ===
In 2022, LFR announced its partnership with Health Emergency Initiative (HEI) to deploy LFR programs in Lagos, Nigeria. The LFR/HEI program aims to train and evaluate the performance of 350 first responders to improve outcomes in the prehospital setting prior to hospital admission in Lagos, "to reduce fatalities from road traffic accidents, which are currently the leading cause of youth casualties in Nigeria." Later in 2022, the Lagos State Command of the Federal Road Safety Corps (FRSC) partnered with HEI and LFR to train 1,000 commercial transporters as lay first responders in Lagos State in order to support FRSC's initiative to reduce road crash fatalities by 15%, with the goal to train additional thousands of first responders in Nigeria in 2023.

== Honors ==
In 2020, LFR was awarded the Prince Michael International Road Safety Award by Prince Michael of Kent in recognition of "exemplary achievement and innovation" in improving road safety and post-crash response globally.

In 2022, LFR was invited to join the Global Alliance of NGOs for Road Safety as a full member.

In 2024, LFR was awarded funding by the United States Agency for International Development (USAID) through the Development Innovation Ventures (DIV) program to conduct a three-year randomized controlled trial in Sierra Leone.
