= Holy Spirit Hospital (Makeni) =

Geography
- Location: Makeni, Sierra Leone
- Coordinates: 8.892507°N 12.036286°W

Organisation
- Type: General
- Religious affiliation: Catholic

History
- Opened: 2002

Links
- Lists: Hospitals in Sierra Leone

The Holy Spirit Hospital is a hospital located in Makeni, Sierra Leone. It is the largest private hospital in the Northern Province of Sierra Leone.

== History ==
The hospital was initially built as a small clinic in 2002 by the Bishop of the Catholic Diocese of Makeni in collaboration with the Albano Diocese of Italy.

In 2013, a diabetes clinic was added to the hospital.

An additional wing was added to the Holy Spirit Hospital and built by Surg+Restore and ReSurge Africa, a Scottish-based charity, in 2014, which also provided training for two future surgeons and two anesthesiologists.

Currently, 3 fully qualified physicians and 60 nurses and support staff treat 300 in-patients and 12,000 out-patients per month. The hospital has 70 beds, a surgical theatre, laboratory, and pharmacy.

In 2019, the Holy Spirit Hospital joined the First Responder Coalition of Sierra Leone (FRCSL) as one of five founding members, alongside the Sierra Leone Red Cross Society, LFR International, University of Makeni, and Agency for Rural Community Transformation.
