= Sierra Leone Psychiatric Teaching Hospital =

Kissy Mental Hospital
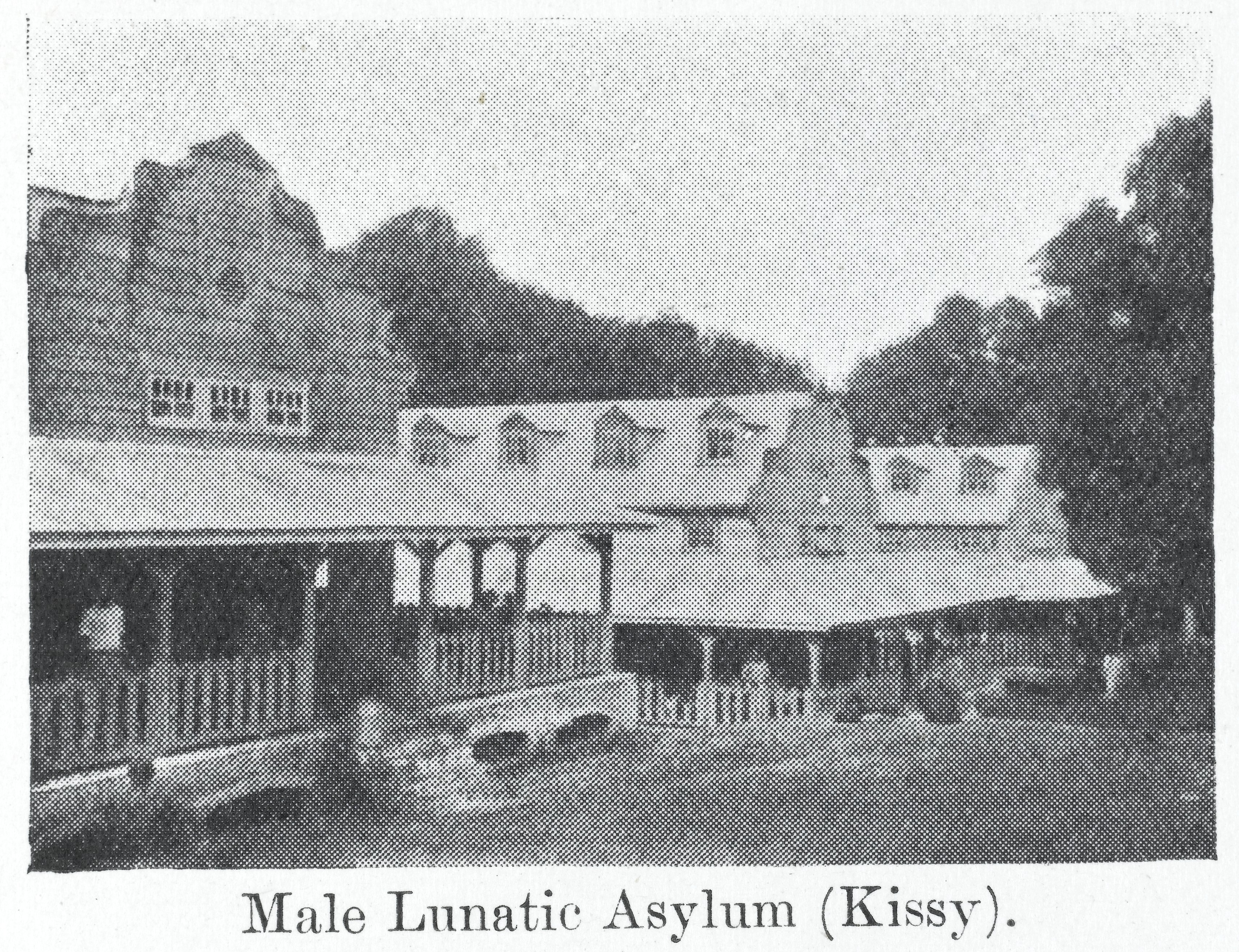
- Male Asylum

Geography
- Location: Sierra Leone

Organisation
- Type: Specialist

Services
- Speciality: Psychiatric hospital

History
- Founded: 1820

Links
- Lists: Hospitals in Sierra Leone

The Sierra Leone Psychiatric Teaching Hospital is the only mental hospital in Sierra Leone. It was previously known as Kissy Mental Hospital.

== History ==
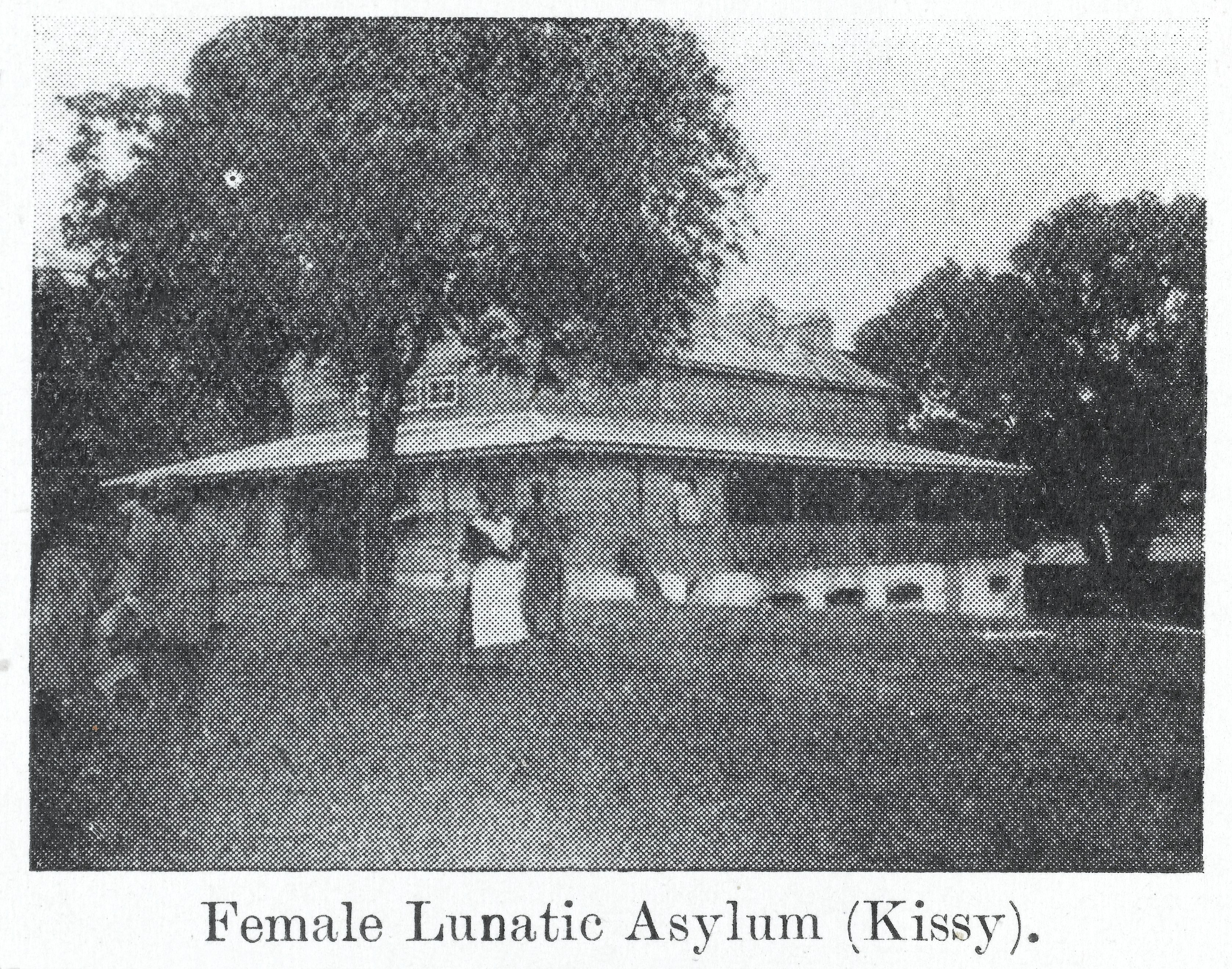
Female Asylum

Kissy Lunatic Asylum was the first Lunatic Asylum established in colonial Sub-Saharan Africa. It was established in 1820 in Kissy and originally catered for both mentally and physically ill people who could not look after themselves. The Asylum was classified as a Colonial hospital in 1844. As the British expanded their colonial holdings. the catchment area of the asylum came to encompass the whole of British West Africa.

== Concerns over facilities ==
In 2010, twelve catering staff were suspended by Mohamed Daudis Koroma following the discovery of evidence which suggested that staff might be taking food meant for patients home with them. Koroma expressed concern over the provision of water and electricity in the hospital, and the drugs supply which he regarded as inadequate.

Then in 2011, concerns were raised over the conditions in Kissy Mental Hospital and the lack of any advocacy for the inmates. Dr Mandy Garber – a Sierra Leonean psychiatrist based in Pittsburgh visited the hospital and reported on what she saw. The utilities were basic, food very sparse and owing to holes in the fence some of the inmates were chained to the bed.

Between January and June 2018 chains were removed from 111 patients, with a further 66 patients being so released between July 2018 and September 2018. Alpha Wurie, the Health and Sanitation Minister of Sierra Leone, visited the hospital on 3 September, removing and dismantling a set of chain restraints. Partners In Health, an international non-governmental organisation, has helped modernise the hospital, updating the water and electricity supply and providing staff training. They participated in the celebration of the removal of chains.
