= Sierra Leone Red Cross Society =

Non-profit organization in Sierra Leone

- Founded: 1962
- Type: Non-profit organisation
- Purpose: Humanitarian Aid
- Location: Sierra Leone
- Affiliations: International Committee of the Red Cross; International Federation of Red Cross and Red Crescent Societies

Sierra Leone Red Cross Society (SLRCS) was established in 1962 by an act of the Parliament of Sierra Leone and is a national society. It has its headquarters in Freetown.

The SLRCS is to render medical and humanitarian assistance to the Armed Forces and citizens of Sierra Leone during times of conflict, disasters or humanitarian crisis. Each year on May 8, the SLRCS joins the rest of the world in celebrating the World Red Cross and Red Crescent Day.

== History ==
The SLRCS played a major part in containing and managing the Ebola crisis/outbreak and in recovery operations from 2014 to 2016.

In 2012, the Sierra Leone Red Cross Society (SLRCS) Act was passed. Section 5, Subsection 2 of the Act states, "The government shall provide subvention to the Society.” Issue was raised in 2018 by the Secretary General, Kpawuru Sandy, as subventions had not been paid since the Act's enactment on December 3, 2012. “We are calling on the government of Sierra Leone to pay subventions to the Red Cross as enshrined in our revised act of 2012 to enable us effectively perform our auxiliary role in humanitarian services".

In 2019, the SLRCS became a founding member of the First Responder Coalition of Sierra Leone (FRCSL), along with LFR International, Agency for Rural Community Transformation (ARCT), the Holy Spirit Hospital (Makeni), and the University of Makeni. Established in Makeni, the Coalition's first chairing member was the SLRCS. The Coalition's mission is to "facilitate the development of emergency first responder programs to alleviate the burden of traumatic injury in Sierra Leone." The Coalition trained 1,000 community members over two months in Makeni to be first responders and equipped each trainee with a first aid kit.
