= Sujal Parikh =

Sujal M. Parikh (1985–2010) was an American global health advocate, University of Michigan medical student, and an NIH-Fogarty Clinical Research Scholar. His research and advocacy efforts focused on access to medicines in developing countries, health and human rights. He died of injuries from a motorcycle-taxi accident in Uganda in 2010. An annual symposium at the University of Michigan honors his life's work.

== Professional career ==
Sujal served as Associated Editor-in-Chief of the American Medical Student Association's Global Pulse journal, on the Student Advisory Committee of the Global Health Education Consortium, on the AIDS Advocacy Network Steering Committee of the American Medical Student Association, on the University of Michigan Center for Global Health's Internal Advisory Council, on the Board of Trustees of the Uganda Village Project, and as chapter leader of the University of Michigan's chapter of Universities Allied for Essential Medicines.

== Research ==
Sujal's scholarly work on health and human rights addressed cluster munitions and the death penalty. Sujal's work in global health education addressed new technologies, ethics and professionalism, and access to scholarly research.

As an NIH-Fogarty Clinical Research Scholar, Sujal's research in Uganda focused on psycho-social rehabilitation of children affected by HIV/AIDS and clinician knowledge of aging and HIV.

== Awards and Leadership ==
In 2009, Sujal received the Emerging Leader Award from Physicians for Human Rights.

In 2010, Sujal was appointed to the Student Advisory Board of Physicians for Human Rights, and inspired many young physicians with a rousing speech at their annual conference.

In 2011, Sujal posthumously received the prestigious Navin Narayan Award for his lifetime achievement in health and human rights from Physicians for Human Rights. Upon receiving his medical diploma posthumously, he also received the University of Michigan's Patrick John Niland Award from the University of Michigan.

In 2012, Sujal was honored by the Texas Legislature for his commitment to health and human rights.
