= Krishnan Raghavendran =

- Education: Jawaharlal Institute of Postgraduate Medical Education and Research; Henry Ford Hospital; Brown University
- Occupation: Surgeon
- Medical career
- Institutions: University at Buffalo; University of Michigan Medical School

Krishnan Raghavendran is Professor of Surgery at the University of Michigan Medical School, Division Chief of Acute Care Surgery, Director of the Michigan Center for Global Surgery, and a trauma, critical care, and general surgeon.

== Education ==
Raghavendran attended medical school at Jawaharlal Institute of Postgraduate Medical Education and Research (JIPMER) in Pondicherry, India and graduated in 1985.

Upon completion of his medical degree in 1991, he moved to Bronx-Lebanon Hospital Center to begin his residency in surgery until 1994, when he moved to Detroit to complete his residency in general surgery at Henry Ford Hospital, which he finished in 1996. He later completed a fellowship in Surgical Critical Care at Brown University in Providence, Rhode Island in 2000.

== Career ==
Raghavendran became an attending trauma surgeon at University at Buffalo, SUNY. In July 2007, he was promoted to associate professor.

In 2008, he was recruited to the University of Michigan and became an associate faculty member at the University of Michigan Medical School. Raghavendran is currently the program director for the University of Michigan's fellowship in surgical critical care and acute care surgery.

Raghavendran has a long-standing interest in global health is one of the lead physicians for the University of Michigan India collaborative, part of the Global REACH program, where he focuses on the delivery of trauma care in India. He has also been working on similar collaborative efforts in Ethiopia and Taiwan. He was appointed the Director of the Michigan Center for Global Surgery upon its founding in 2017.

He has specialized in acute care surgery, including trauma and care of the critically ill. His main areas of publication have included venous thromboembolism (VTE), aspiration-induced lung injury, pulmonary surfactant biology, and decompressive craniectomy for traumatic brain injury (TBI). He has also been involved in the study of TBI and trauma systems in the global arena.

== Research ==
Raghavendran has been continuously funded by the National Institutes of Health (NIH) since 2006 by the National Institute of General Medical Sciences (NIGMS) and by an R0-1 award from the National Heart, Lung, and Blood Institute (NHLBI). His research has focused on direct forms of lung injury including lung contusion and gastric aspiration-induced lung injury. His laboratory research has focused primarily on studying the chemokine modulation in inflammatory mechanisms associated with both lung contusion and its interaction with gastric aspiration.

He has published more than 100 peer-reviewed articles and has been cited more than 1,000 times.

Additional areas of interest center on the role of Toll-like receptors and micro RNA in the pathogenesis of acute inflammatory response in direct forms of lung injury. The focuses of his clinical interests are on the development of therapeutic strategies to mitigate the progression of these risk factors to ARDS, surfactant replacement therapy, and ventilator-associated pneumonia. He also collaborates with in the areas of ultrasound biology, single cell imaging and microfluidic studies of liquid-air interface.
