= Global Prehospital Consortium =

The Global Prehospital Consortium, also known as GPC, is an international collaborative of organizations directing community bystander-driven emergency medical services programs, currently representing operations across 12 countries on 3 continents with 22,000 first responders. The GPC supports governments, non-governmental organizations, and other stakeholders to inform capacity-building efforts to cost-effectively implement evidence-based emergency care interventions in low- and middle-income countries.

== History ==
The GPC working group was initially formed in 2022, comprising 11 representatives from seven community bystander-driven emergency medical services (EMS) organizations.

Over an eight month period between November 2022 and June 2023 using a 9-round modified Delphi-based approach, consensus was reached among participants on seven priorities to direct global efforts toward EMS development. Priorities included infrastructure/operations, communication, education/training, impact evaluation, financing, governance/legal, and transportation/equipment.

Published in Injury in 2024, investigational priorities of the GPC include responder density/distribution, patient variable standardization, dispatch, curricula, and new indices for cost-effectiveness and impact.

== External ==
- Official website
