= Hatfield Archer Memorial Hospital =

Hospital in Rotifunk, Sierra Leone

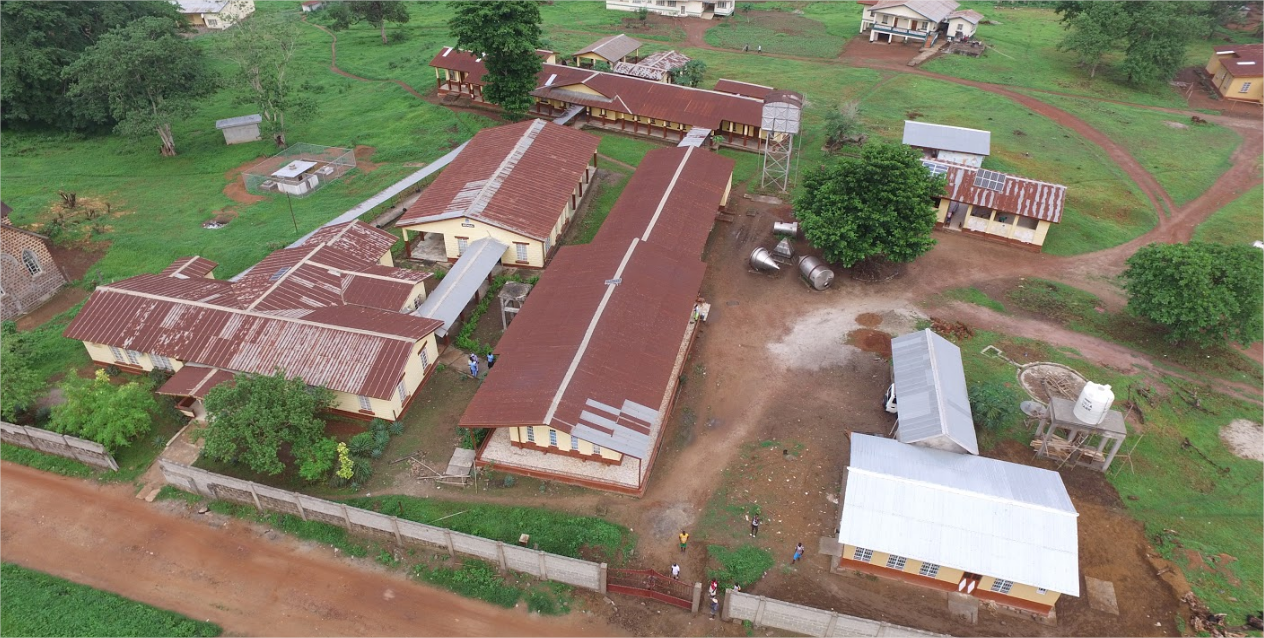
- Aerial photo of the hospital area

Geography
- Location: Rotifunk, Moyamba District, Southern Province, Sierra Leone
- Coordinates: 8.48882844309534°N 13.238610972652886°W

Organisation
- Type: General

Services
- Emergency department: Yes
- Beds: 52

Helipads
- Helipad: No

History
- Founded: 1906

The Hatfield Archer Memorial Hospital is a hospital in the town of Rotifunk, Moyamba District, Southern Province, Sierra Leone. It has 52 beds.

The hospital is named for Marietta Hatfield and Mary Archer, two members of a group of five United Brethren in Christ missionaries who were killed at Rotifunk during the Hut Tax War of 1898. The facility was dedicated as the Hatfield-Archer Medical Dispensary in 1906. It was later known as Rotifunk Hospital but was rededicated under its current name in 2014.
