= Prince Michael International Road Safety Award =

Annual award

The Prince Michael International Road Safety Award
- Awarded for: Outstanding achievement and innovation in improving global road safety
- Location: London, England
- Presented by: Prince Michael of Kent
- First award: 1987
- Website: www.roadsafetyawards.com

The Prince Michael International Road Safety Award is an annual award presented by Prince Michael of Kent since 1987 for outstanding achievement and innovation in improving road safety globally and is the top international road safety award.

== History ==
The award was originally created in 1987 to give public recognition to those improving road safety throughout Great Britain. The focus has since been expanded to assess road safety achievements, innovations, and improvements world-wide. Each December, Prince Michael has presented the award to honorees during a Gala Presentation at The Savoy in Westminster.

It celebrated its 30th year in 2017. It is awarded for innovation in road safety.

== Focus Areas ==
The award bases its categories on the five pillars of the Global Plan for a Decade of Action for Road Safety (2011–2020) and focuses its selection on achievement and innovation in one of the following areas:

- Alcohol / drug-related
- Applied Technology
- Driver Education
- Education and Training
- Enforcement
- Fleet Safety
- Highway engineering improvement
- Media
- Motorcycle
- Occupational Road Safety
- Post Crash Response
- Public Education
- Road Safety Management
- Safer Road Users
- Safer Roads
- School Community-based
- Vehicle Safety
- Young Drivers

Each year His Royal Highness also presents a "Premier Award" to the organization which he considers has had the most impact on road safety.

== Other road safety award ==
Europe also has an annual Excellence in Road Safety Awards, in Brussels.

== Notable winners ==
- Fédération Internationale de l'Automobile (FIA)
- Global Alliance of NGOs for Road Safety
- International Road Assessment Programme (iRAP)
- International Road Federation
- International Transport Forum
- LFR International
- MAPFRE
- New Car Assessment Program (Global NCAP)
- RAC Foundation
- SaveLIFE Foundation
- The Floow Limited
- Transport for London (TfL)
- Safe Way Right Way Uganda
