= Lay First Responder Model =

The Lay First Responder Model, or LFR Model, uses motorcycle taxi drivers trained as first responders to provide basic prehospital emergency care in resource-limited settings of low- and middle-income countries. First published in the World Journal of Surgery in 2018, it was initially demonstrated in Uganda in 2016. Since its creation, the lay first responder model has also been deployed across Chad and Sierra Leone.

== History ==
The global injury burden, representing 10% of global mortality, is disproportionately borne by low- and middle-income countries. In high-income countries, emergency medical services address injured patients in the prehospital setting, but these systems are absent or non-robust in resource-limited settings, exacerbated by poorly resourced and trained personnel. As motorization increases in low- and middle-income countries, the global burden of injury is projected to expand in these settings. Replicating high-income country emergency medical services in resource-limited settings of low- and middle-income countries has failed due to financial inviability, predicating the need for an alternative strategy to provide prehospital emergency care in resource-limited settings of low- and middle-income countries. In 2004, the World Health Organization recommended training bystanders as the first step toward establishing formal emergency medical services, but no systematic model existed to support scaling up prehospital care using bystanders or development into mature systems.

=== EFAR System Model ===
Initial work by Jared Sun and Lee A. Wallis training community members as emergency first aid responders in Manenberg, South Africa eventually led to the creation of the EFAR System Model in 2012. Community members arrived earlier to accidents than professionally dispatched emergency medical providers, suggesting formal programs training community members was worth exploring. Though it was designed to support the development of formal emergency care systems, the EFAR system model has primarily served to alleviate inconsistent and unreliable response times of emergency services in the Cape Town area, with some expansion into Zambia in 2015.

=== Lay First Responder Model ===
In 2016, similar issues with a lack of prehospital response that had been recognized in Uganda by Peter G. Delaney prompted the search for a sustainable alternative, which could affordably provide prehospital emergency care. Motorcycle taxi drivers who were closest to road traffic injuries, possessed a means of transport, and self-dispersed in search of customers (providing wide geographic coverage) were then trained as lay first responders. After three years, 75% of initial trainees continued to respond to emergencies voluntarily reportedly because of increased social stature, customer acquisition, and confidence as lay first responders. In later studies, findings were replicated in Chad and Sierra Leone by LFR International with thousands of other motorcycle taxis, with results demonstrating training lay first responders significantly expanded prehospital care availability cost-effectively.

== See also ==
- EFAR System Model
