= Decade of Action for Road Safety 2011–2020 =

The Decade of Action for Road Safety 2011–2020 was officially proclaimed by the United Nations General Assembly in March 2010. Its goal is to stabilize and reduce the forecast level of road traffic deaths around the world. It is estimated that 5 million lives could be saved on the world's roads during the decade.

According to the Global status report on road safety, road traffic crashes take the lives of nearly 1.3 million people every year, and injure 20–50 million more. More than 90% of road traffic deaths and injuries occur in low-income and middle-income countries, which have only 48% of the world’s registered vehicles. If no action is taken, road traffic crashes are predicted to result in the deaths of around 1.9 million people annually by 2020.

Global activities related to the Decade are coordinated by the United Nations Road Safety Collaboration. Grover, a fictional character from the television show Sesame Street, was named a Global Ambassador by the WHO.

== Background ==
For many years road traffic crashes have been acknowledged by the United Nations as a considerable challenge to the achievement of health and development goals. In 2008, the Commission for Global Road Safety called for a global road safety decade. This idea was formalized in the Declaration which resulted from the First Global Ministerial Conference on Road Safety, hosted by the Government of the Russian Federation in November 2009. The Decade of Action for Road Safety 2011–2020 was proclaimed by the United Nations General Assembly in March 2010.

The United Nations resolution A/RES/64/255 sets the goal for the Decade "to stabilize and then reduce the forecast level of road traffic fatalities around the world by increasing activities conducted at the national, regional and global levels." The resolution calls on all Member States to set road safety targets to be achieved during the Decade. While governments are expected to lead on the implementation of activities, the resolution specifically calls for a multi-sectoral approach that includes academia, the private sector, civil society, the media, victims and their families.

== Global Plan ==
The United Nations Road Safety Collaboration has developed a Global Plan for the Decade of Action for Road Safety 2011–2020 as an overall framework for activities which may take place in the context of the Decade. The categories or "pillars" of activities are: road safety management; safer roads and mobility; safer vehicles; safer road users; and post-crash response. A private sector coalition that promotes road safety, Together for Safer Roads (TSR), aligns with these Pillars by developing programs for the private sector to improve road safety.

Pillar 1

Global Plan focuses on the need to strengthen institutional capacity to further national road safety efforts. It includes activities such as putting into practice major United Nations road safety conventions; establishing a lead agency for road safety in the country involving partners from a range of sectors; developing a national road safety strategy; and setting realistic and long-term targets for related activities with sufficient funding for their implementation. It also calls for development of data systems to monitor and evaluate activities.

Pillar 2

Highlights the need to improve the safety of road networks for the benefit of all road users, especially the most vulnerable: pedestrians, bicyclists and motorcyclists. Activities include improving the safety-conscious planning, design, construction and operation of roads; making sure that roads are regularly assessed for safety; and encouraging relevant authorities to consider all forms of transport and types of safe infrastructure when they respond to the mobility needs of road users.

Pillar 3

Addresses the need for improved vehicle safety by encouraging harmonization of relevant global standards and mechanisms to accelerate the uptake of new technologies which impact on safety. It includes activities such as implementing new car assessment programmes so that consumers are aware of the safety performance of vehicles, and trying to ensure that all new motor vehicles are equipped with minimum safety features, such as seat belts. Other activities covered include promoting more widespread use of crash avoidance technologies with proven effectiveness, such as electronic stability control and anti-lock braking systems.

Pillar 4

Focuses on developing comprehensive programmes to improve road user behaviour. Activities include encouraging the development and adoption of model road safety legislation and sustained or increased enforcement of road safety laws and standards. These efforts are combined with public awareness and education to increase seat-belt and helmet wearing and to reduce drinking and driving, speeding and other risks. It also calls for activities to reduce work-related road traffic injuries and promotes the establishment of graduated driver licensing programmes for novice drivers.

== Launch ==
The Decade of Action for Road Safety 2011–2020 was officially launched on 11 May 2011 in more than 100 countries, through hundreds of national and local events. Governments, international agencies, civil society organizations and private companies marked the beginning of the Decade across the globe.

Using the Global Plan as a roadmap, many countries have developed or are in the process of developing their own national plans for the Decade. Some of these plans cover the full ten-year period, while a few address shorter time frames. They may reflect activities on all five pillars of the Global Plan, or focus on just one or two pillars.

On the occasion of the Decade launch, many countries revised existing or adopted new road safety legislation, among them Austria, China, France and New Zealand.

Several iconic landmarks were illuminated with the road safety "tag", which is the graphic symbol for the Decade. Some of the best known of these include:

- El Obelisco, Argentina;
- Sydney Harbour Bridge and Brisbane City Hall, Australia;
- Christ the Redeemer statue in Rio de Janeiro, Brazil;
- CN Tower in Toronto, Canada;
- Palace of Culture and Science, Warsaw, Poland;
- Moscow State University, the Russian Federation;
- World Trade Center in Colombo, Sri Lanka;
- Jet d'eau in Geneva, Switzerland;
- Trafalgar Square, London, UK;
- Times Square, New York City, US;
- The fountain of Plaza Venezuela in Caracas, Venezuela;
- Dong Xuan Market in Hanoi, Vietnam.

== Support ==
Many public figures offered their support to the goals of the Decade of Action for Road Safety 2011–2020.

- Ban Ki-moon, United Nations Secretary-General, said in a statement: "Now we need to move this campaign into high gear and steer our world to safer roads ahead. Together, we can save millions of lives."
- Dmitry Medvedev, President of the Russian Federation, wrote in his letter of support: "The international community therefore has a duty to develop a common strategy and joint action to enhance road safety."
- Felipe Calderón, President of Mexico; David Cameron, Prime Minister of the United Kingdom of Great Britain and Northern Ireland; and Julia Gillard, Prime Minister of Australia were among others heads of statement and government who issued public statements of support to the goals of the Decade.

In many other countries heads of state put their weight behind the Decade by personally attending launch events (for example, in Croatia, Cyprus, Ethiopia, Mexico, Moldova, Slovenia, Sri Lanka and others).

Inspired by the United Nations’ actions, Together for Safer Roads (TSR) was launched, which included assembling an Expert Panel to make recommendations on the ways that the private sector can help, which published the Investing in Road Safety: A Global Imperative for the Private Sector White Paper. The White Paper shows that road collisions cost the global economy USD$518 billion per year, and comes with a price tag of up to 3 percent of a nation’s GDP.

== Road Safety Fund ==
The Road Safety Fund was created to raise funds for activities which contribute to the implementation of the national plans for the Decade of Action for Road Safety 2011–2020. The Fund raises financial contributions from corporations, the general public and other donors. Global and national corporate supporters are able to associate themselves officially with the Decade. The Fund supports a wide range of not-for-profit partners in developing countries including governments, non-governmental organizations, academic institutions and others on the frontline in the fight against road traffic deaths and injuries.
