= Universal Health Coverage Day =

Annual observance

- Type: International
- Date: 12 December
- Started by: World Health Organization

Universal Health Coverage Day is celebrated annually on December 12 and is promoted by the World Health Organization.

December 12 is the anniversary of the first unanimous United Nations resolution calling for all nations to provide for their citizens affordable, quality health care.

UHC is promoted as an instrument to help advance the more broadly conceived human right to health, which is based upon a number of international agreements, or widely affirmed international documents.

Universal health coverage has been included in the new Sustainable Development Goals for 2015-2030, adopted by the United Nations. In many nations, inclusive healthcare is very rudimentary and does not include heroic interventions or long term care. WaterAid reports that national infrastructure in many nations cannot support first world healthcare delivery mechanisms because it may not even provide potable water, let alone electricity.

A major WHO and UNICEF survey in 2015 reported that 38% of healthcare facilities surveyed did not have access to a basic water source, and 35% lacked the materials necessary for people to wash their hands effectively. When healthcare workers can’t keep facilities clean and prevent infections, their ability to deliver safe, effective, and dignified care is undermined.

The WASH Initiative (Water, sanitation, and hygiene in healthcare facilities) of the WHO and UNICEF - and their global partners, is part of the UN's Global Action Plan "to ensure that all health care facilities in all settings have adequate water, sanitation and hygiene services by 2030."

In 2016, the celebration is December 12, 2016. The standard logo is a gold circle with black and white print, showing the year's date of the celebration.

The eleven organizing partners are: The Rockefeller Foundation, World Bank Group, World Health Organization, Oxfam, Save the Children, Management Sciences for health, Action for Global Health, CapUHC, Community Working Group on Health, Global Parliamentary Network on UHC, and Public Health Foundation of India. Forty-two academic institutions and about 792 other non-governmental organizations (NGOs) are listed as Global Partners.
