= Makeni =

- City
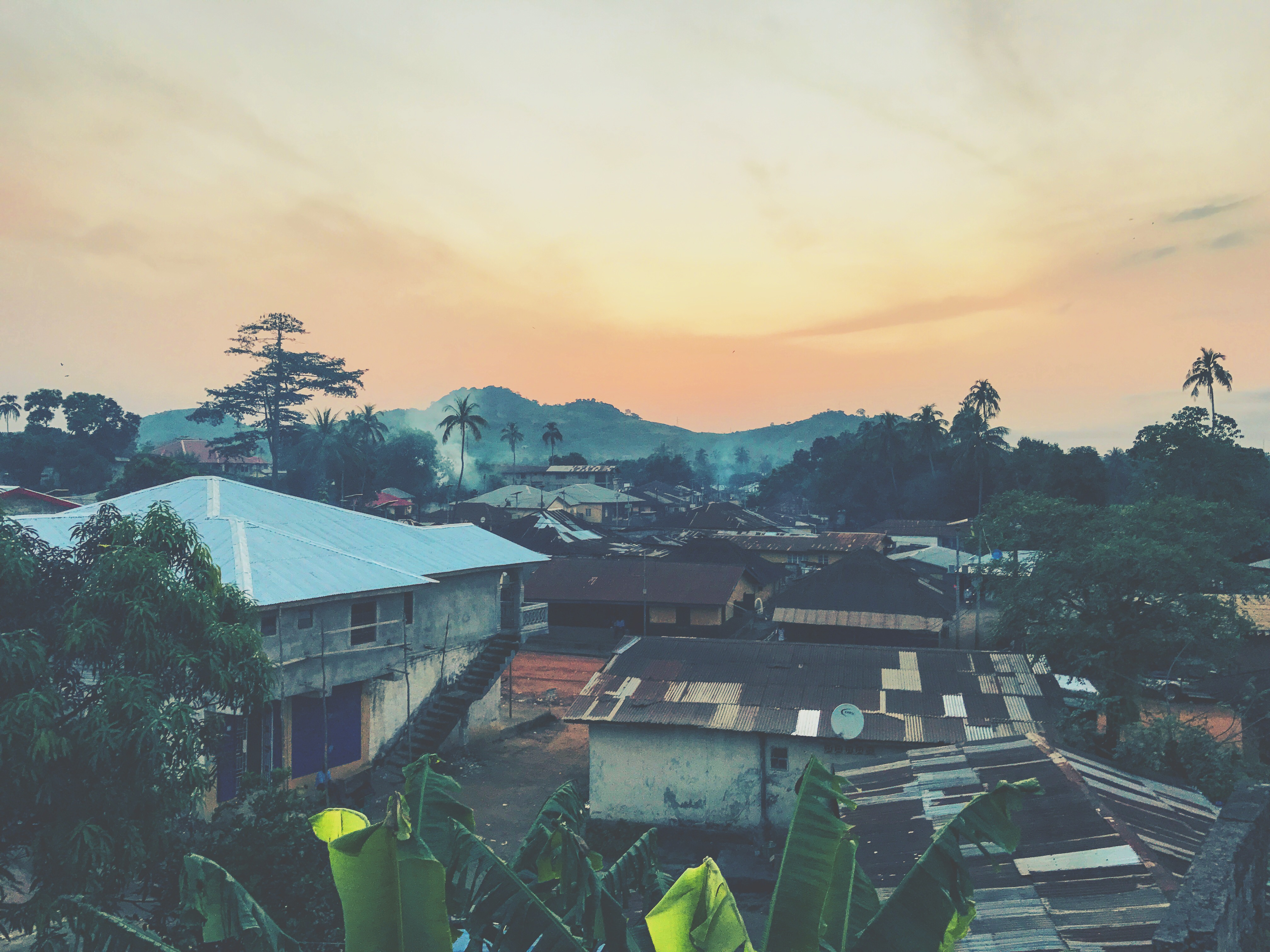
- Sunset over Makeni

- Location within Sierra Leone
- Coordinates: 8°52′54″N 12°02′39″W
- Country: Sierra Leone
- Province: Northern Province
- District: Bombali District
- Chiefdom: Bombali Shebora

Government
  - Type: City Council
  - Mayor: Abubakarr Kamara (APC)
  - Deputy Mayor: Ibrahim Nelson Kamara (APC)
  - Governing Body: Makeni City Council

Population (2021 Census)
  - Total: 85,116
- Time zone: UTC+00:00 (GMT)

Makeni is the largest city in the Northern Province of Sierra Leone. The city is the capital of Bombali District, and is the economic center of the Northern Province. Makeni is the fifth largest city in Sierra Leone by population. The city of Makeni had a population of 85,116 in the 2021 census. Makeni lies approximately 110 miles east of Freetown. Makeni is home to the University of Makeni, the largest private university in Sierra Leone.

== Government ==
The city of Makeni is one of Sierra Leone's six municipalities and is governed by a city council which is headed by a mayor in whom executive authority is vested. The mayor is responsible for the general management of the city and is elected directly by the residents of Makeni in municipal elections held every four years. As of June 2023, the mayor of Makeni is Abubakarr Kamara ("Lamtales") of the All People's Congress (APC). Kamara won the June 2023 Makeni mayoral election, garnering 93.38% of the total votes cast.

Like most parts of Northern Sierra Leone, Makeni is a reliable political stronghold of the ruling All People's Congress (APC) political party. The city and the entire Bombali District overwhelmingly support the APC in a large majority in Presidential, Parliamentary, and local councils elections.

== Demographics ==
The population of Makeni is ethnically diverse, though the Temne people make up the largest ethnic group in the city. The Krio language is used as the primary language of communication among the different ethnic groups in the city. The population of Makeni is predominantly Muslim, though with a large Christian minority population in the city. The Wesleyan Methodists are the largest and main Christian denomination in Makeni.

== Sport ==
Like the rest of Sierra Leone, Football is by far the most popular sport in the city. Makeni is home to one of Sierra Leone's biggest and oldest football clubs called the Wusum Stars. The club plays in the Sierra Leone National Premier League, the top football league in the country. The club represents Makeni and the entire Bombali District. They won the Sierra Leonean FA Cup in 1979. Makeni has also played host to matches of the Sierra Leone National football team's under-17 and under-20 teams at the city's Wusum Sports Stadium.

== Media ==
The local radio station that serves Makeni and the Bombali District is Radio Mankneh 95.1. Sierra Leone's national radio and television stations, SLBC (Sierra Leone Broadcasting Cooperation) are on the air in the city, as well as The BBC World Service, CNN International, and several other private stations are on the air for those who have satellite.

== Education ==
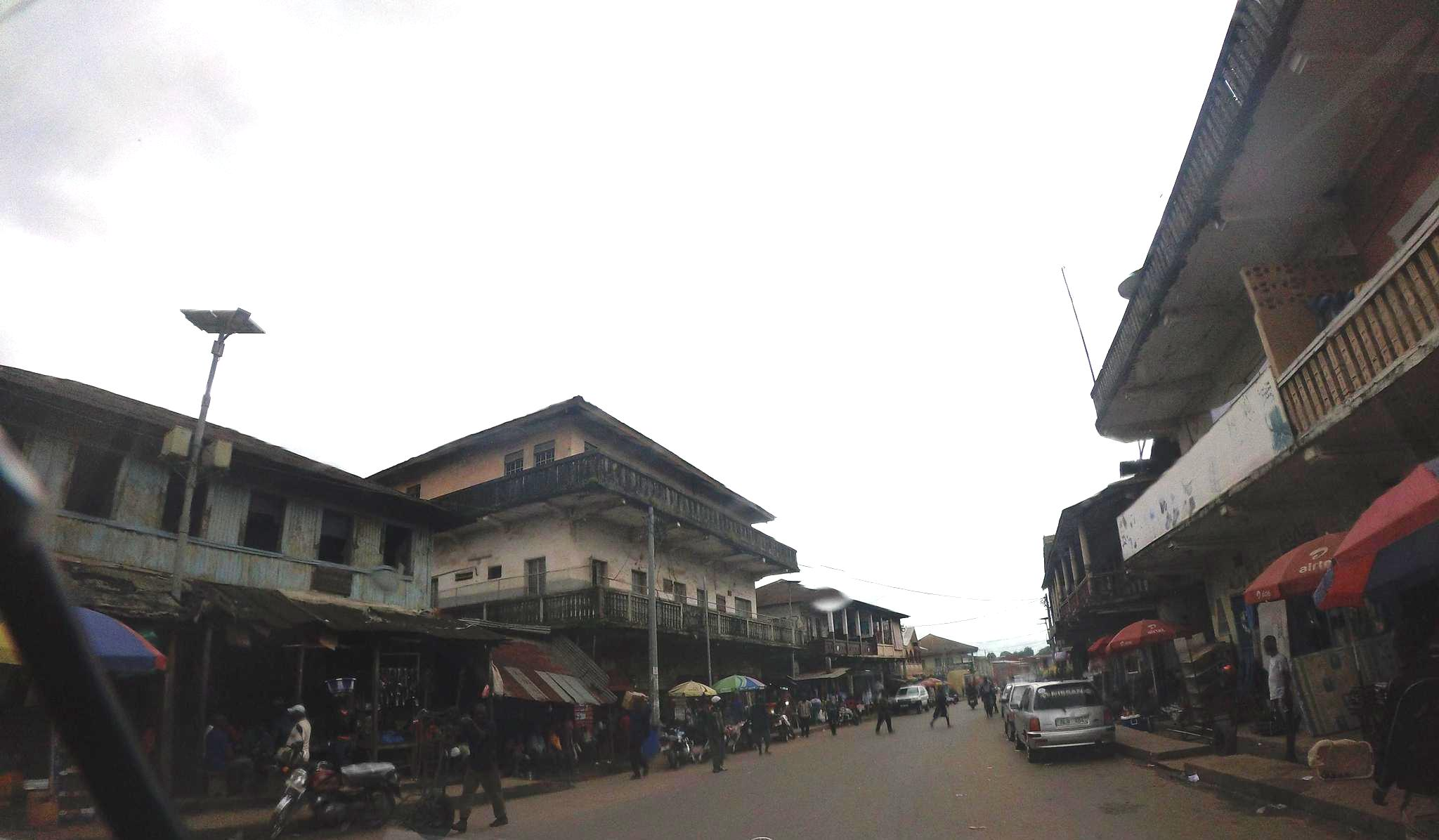
Rogbane Road in the centre of Makeni

Like the rest of Sierra Leone, Makeni has an education system with six years of primary school (Class 1–6), and seven years of secondary school (Form 1–7); secondary schools are further divided into Junior secondary school (Form 1-3) and Senior secondary school (Form 4–7). Primary schools usually start from ages 6 to 12, and secondary schools usually start from ages 13 to 18. Primary Education is free and compulsory in government-sponsored public schools.

The city is home to the University of Makeni, the largest private university in Sierra Leone. St. Francis Secondary School is also located in Makeni, one of the most prominent secondary schools in Sierra Leone.

== Health ==
Diseases endemic to Makeni are yellow fever and malaria. Healthcare in Makeni is provided by a mix of government, private and non-governmental organizations (NGOs). The Ministry of Health and Sanitation (MOHS) shifted to a decentralized health system structure after the end of the civil in war in 2002, to increase coverage.

One regional government hospital and the Holy Spirit Hospital provide most healthcare services, in addition to private clinics. The Holy Spirit Hospital is the largest private hospital in the Northern Province of Sierra Leone. Traditional medicine forms part of the primary health care system in Makeni.

In 2019, the First Responder Coalition of Sierra Leone (FRCSL) was formed in Makeni by five national and international organizations: the Sierra Leone Red Cross Society, LFR International, Agency for Rural Community Transformation, the Holy Spirit Hospital of Makeni, and the University of Makeni. 1,000 community members from Makeni were trained as first responders and equipped with a first aid kit by the Coalition. 4,529 lay first responders were trained between July and December 2019, who went on to treat 1,850 patients over the following six months.

== Aid from China ==
In March 2010, the Chinese ambassador to Sierra Leone, Qiu Shaofang traveled to the city on an official visit to donate one 16 kVA generator and nine sewing machines.

== Notable people from Makeni ==
Makeni is the hometown of former Sierra Leone's president Ernest Bai Koroma, as he was born and raised in the city. Additional notable people from Makeni are:

- Brima Koroma, football star
- Sylvanus Koroma, the father of Ernest Bai Koroma
- Edward Turay, lawyer
- Michaela DePrince, international ballerina

== See also ==
- Holy Spirit Hospital (Makeni)
- City Garden Clinic
