= Inter-territorial Catholic Bishops' Conference of The Gambia and Sierra Leone =

Assembly of Catholic bishops

- Abbreviation: ITCABIC
- Formation: 1966
- Type: NGO
- Legal status: Civil nonprofit
- Headquarters: Santanno House, Freetown, Sierra Leone
- Region served: Sierra Leone and Gambia
- Members: Active and retired Catholic bishops of the Sierra Leone and Gambia
- President: Patrick Daniel Koroma
- Main organ: Conference
- Website: www.catholicchurchsl.org

The Inter-territorial Catholic Bishops' Conference of The Gambia and Sierra Leone (ITCABIC) is the episcopal conference of the Catholic Church in Sierra Leone and The Gambia.

The current president is The Most Reverend Patrick Daniel Koroma, Bishop of Kenema

== History ==
Founded in 1971, it originally included the Bishops of Sierra Leone, The Gambia and Liberia. The Catholic Bishops' Conference of Liberia was established in 1998. Today, the Inter-territorial Catholic Bishops' Conference of The Gambia and Sierra Leone consists of all active and retired members of the Catholic hierarchy (i.e., diocesan, coadjutor, and auxiliary bishops and the ordinary of the Personal Ordinariate of the Chair of Saint Peter) in Sierra Leone and The Gambia.

== Caritas Sierra Leone ==
Established in 1981, Caritas Sierra Leone was formed by the Catholic Bishops Conference of Sierra Leone for the purpose of serving as the relief and development branch of the Catholic Church in Sierra Leone.

Caritas Sierra Leone was active during the Sierra Leone Civil War providing shelter, nourishment, trauma counselling and advocacy for child soldiers.

In post war Sierra Leone, Caritas participated in peace building actions but has also worked with humanitarian relief, youth empowerment, gender equality, poverty eradication and HIV/AIDS prevention.

== Regions ==
The dioceses of the Sierra Leone and The Gambia are grouped into 5 regions: and the Metropolitan Freetown, Bo, Kenema, Makeni and Banjul.

== Presidents of the Bishops' Conference ==
- 1971-1975: Thomas Joseph Brosnahan, Archbishop of Freetown and Bo
- 1975-1977: Michael Joseph Moloney, Bishop of Banjul
- 1977-1980: Augusto Fermo Azzolini, Bishop of Makeni
- 1980-1983: Joseph Henry Ganda, Archbishop of Freetown and Bo
- 1983-1986: Michael Kpakala Francis, Archbishop of Monrovia
- 1986-1989: Michael J. Cleary, Bishop of Banjul
- 1989-1992: Boniface Nyema Dalieh, Bishop of Cape Palmas
- 1992-1995: John C. O'Riordan, Bishop of Kenema
- 1995-1998: Benedict Dotu Sekey, Bishop of Gbarnga
- 1998-2001: George Biguzzi, Bishop of Makeni
- 2001-2003: Joseph Henry Ganda, Archbishop of Freetown and Bo
- 2003-2004: Michael J. Cleary, Bishop of Banjul
- 2004-2010: George Biguzzi, Bishop of Makeni
- From 2010: Patrick Daniel Koroma, Bishop of Kenema

† = deceased

== See also ==
- Catholic Church in Sierra Leone
- Collegiality in the Catholic Church
- Historical list of the Catholic bishops of the Sierra Leone
- History of Roman Catholicism in the Sierra Leone
- List of Catholic bishops of the Sierra Leone
- List of Catholic dioceses in Gambia and Sierra Leone
- Caritas Sierra Leone
- The Missionary Sisters of the Holy Rosary
- Christ the King College

== See also ==
- Episcopal conference
- List of Roman Catholic dioceses in Sierra Leone (4)
- List of Roman Catholic dioceses in the Gambia (1)
