= Charles Allieu Matthew Campbell =

Sierra Leonean Roman Catholic prelate (born 1961)

The Most Reverend Charles Allieu Matthew Campbell
- Bishop of Bo, Sierra Leone
- Church: Catholic Church
- Archdiocese: Roman Catholic Archdiocese of Freetown
- See: Catholic Diocese of Bo
- Appointed: 15 January 2011
- Installed: 7 May 2011
- Predecessor: None (Diocese erected)
- Successor: Incumbent

Orders
- Ordination: 9 April 1986
- Consecration: 7 May 2011 by George Antonysamy
- Rank: Bishop

Personal details
- Born: Charles Allieu Matthew Campbell; 2 January 1959 (age 67) Njala, Sierra Leone
- Motto: "Fiat Voluntas Tua" (Thy will be done)

Styles of Charles Allieu Matthew Campbell
- Reference style: Your Lordship; The Most Reverend
- Spoken style: His Lordship
- Religious style: Bishop

Charles Allieu Matthew Campbell (born 25 January 1961) is a Sierra Leonian Roman Catholic prelate who is the bishop of the Roman Catholic Diocese of Bo in Sierra Leone since January 2011. He was appointed bishop on 15 January 2011 by Pope Benedict XVI. He was consecrated and installed at Bo, Sierra Leone on 7 May 2011. He previously served a priest of the Roman Catholic Archdiocese of Freetown.

== Background and education ==
He was born on 25 January 1961 in Njala, Kori Chiefdom, in Moyamba District, Archdiocese of Freetown and Bo. He studied philosophy and theology at St Paul's Major Seminary in Gbarnga, Liberia. He was ordained a priest of the Roman Catholic Archdiocese of Freetown and Bo on 9 April 1986.

== Priesthood ==
He was ordained a priest of the Archdiocese of Freetown and Bo on 9 April 1986. He served in that capacity until 15 January 2011.

He served in various roles and locations while a priest, including as:

- Assistant parish priest in the parishes of Njala, Komboya, Pujehun and Moyamba from 1986 until 1988.
- Director of Vocations at St Augustine Minor Seminary from 1988 until 1998.
- Rector at St Augustine Minor Seminary from 1988 until 1998.
- Advanced studies in Nigeria from 1990 until 1992.
- Parish priest in Damballa Parish from 1992 until 1995.
- Professor at St Paul's Major Seminary in Makeni from 1995 until 2004.
- Course of religious formation at St Anselm's College in England from 2004 until 2006.
- Spiritual Director at St Paul's Major Seminary, Freetown from 2004 until 2011.

== As bishop ==
On 15 January 2011, Pope Benedict XVI created the Roman Catholic Diocese of Bo by splitting the erstwhile Roman Catholic Archdiocese of Freetown and Bo into the Diocese of Bo the Archdiocese of Freetown. The Holy Father appointed Father Charles Allieu Matthew Campbell as the pioneer bishop of the new diocese of Bo.

He was consecrated and installed at Bo on 7 May 2011 by the hands of Archbishop George Antonysamy, Titular Archbishop of Sulci assisted by Archbishop Edward Tamba Charles, Archbishop of Freetown and Bishop Patrick Daniel Koroma, Bishop of Kenema.

== See also ==
- Catholic Church in Sierra Leone

== Succession table ==
Catholic Church titles
Preceded by None (Diocese erected)	Bishop of Bo (since 15 January 2011)	Succeeded by Incumbent
