= Henry Aruna =

Sierra Leonean Roman Catholic prelate (born in 1964)

The Most Reverend Henry Aruna
- Bishop of Kenema, Sierra Leone
- Church: Catholic Church
- Archdiocese: Roman Catholic Archdiocese of Freetown
- See: Roman Catholic Diocese of Kenema
- Appointed: 26 January 2019
- Installed: 26 January 2019
- Predecessor: Patrick Daniel Koroma
- Successor: Incumbent
- Other posts: 1. Auxiliary Bishop of Kenema (18 July 2015 - 26 January 2019); 2. Bishop of Makeni (7 January 2012 -18 July 2015)

Orders
- Ordination: 26 October 1985
- Consecration: 5 January 2013 by Protase Rugambwa

Personal details
- Born: Henry Aruna; 2 August 1964 (age 61) Yamandu, Diocese of Kenema, Kono District, Sierra Leone
- Motto: "In Deo Confido" (I trust in God)

Styles of Henry Aruna
- Religious style: Bishop

Henry Aruna (born 2 August 1964) is a Sierra Leonean prelate of the Catholic Church who is the Bishop of the Roman Catholic Diocese of Kenema since 26 January 2019. Before then, since 18 July 2015, he was Auxiliary Bishop of the Diocese of Kenema. He concurrently served as Titular Bishop of Nasbinca, while auxiliary bishop. Prior to that, he served as bishop of the Roman Catholic Diocese of Makeni in northern Sierra Leone from 7 January 2012 until 18 July 2015. He was appointed bishop by Pope Benedict XVI on 7 January 2012. He was consecrated bishop one year later in Freetown on 5 January 2013. Due to hostility towards his installation at Makeni, he never took Canonical possession of the diocese. On 18 Jul 2015 Pope Francis appointed him auxiliary bishop of Kenema. Following the death of Bishop Patrick Daniel Koroma, the previous local ordinary of Kenema Diocese, which occurred on 14 December 2018, The Holy Father appointed Bishop Henry Aruna as the new bishop at Kenema, effective 26 January 2019.

== Early life and education ==
Henry Aruna was born on 2 August 1964 at Yamandu, Diocese of Kenema, Kono District in the Eastern Province of Sierra Leone. He attended Saint Paul's Primary School in Kenema. He completed his secondary school education at the Holy Trinity Secondary School, also in Kenema. He studied at the Saint Kizito Minor Seminary at Kenema from 1982 until he graduated in 1985. From 1985 until 1989, he studied philosophy at the Saint Paul's College Seminary in Gbarnga, Liberia and at the seminary at Makeni, in Sierra Leone. He graduated from there with a Bachelor of Philosophy degree. From 1989 until 1992, he followed that with studies of theology, obtaining his Bachelor of Theology from the same seminaries. In 1977, he took a short course in "religious formation: Counselling, Human Growth, Spirituality and Development" at the Institute of St Anselm, Kent, England. He studied at the University of Sierra Leone from 2004 until 2005, graduating with a Master of Education degree. He also holds a Licentiate in Philosophy, awarded by the Pontifical Urban University in Rome.

== Priest ==
He was ordained a priest for the diocese of Kenema on 16 April 1993. He served as priest until 7 January 2012.

He served in various roles and locations while a priest, including:

- Vicar in the parish of Blama from 1993 until 1995.
- Administrator of the Catholic mission among the refugees, in collaboration with Caritas and UNHCR from 1995 until 1996.
- Professor at Saint Paul's Major Seminary in Makeni from 1996 until 1999.
- Short course at the Institute of Saint Anselm, in Kent, England in 1997.
- Studies for a Licentiate in Philosophy at the Pontifical Urban University in Rome from 1999 until 2011.
- Professor at St. Paul's Major Seminary in Freetown from 2001 until 2009.
- Dean of Studies and Bursar at St. Paul's Major Seminary in Freetown from 2001 until 2009
- Studies for Master of Education at the University of Sierra Leone from 2004 until 2005.
- Secretary of the Episcopal Conference of Gambia and Sierra Leone from 2008 until 2012.
- National Director of the Pontifical Mission Societies from 2008 until 2012.

== Bishop ==
On 7 January 2012, Pope Benedict XVI accepted the resignation from the pastoral care of the diocese of Makeni, in Sierra Leone, presented by Bishop Giorgio Biguzzi. The Holy Father appointed Reverend Henry Aruna of the clergy of Kenema, Sierra Leone, as the new ordinary at Makeni.

There was open opposition to his installation at Makeni, from diocesan clergy and lay Catholics in Makeni Diocese. He was ordained bishop on 5 January 2013 in Freetown. The Principal Consecrator was Protase Rugambwa, Bishop Emeritus of Kigoma assisted by George Antonysamy, Archbishop of Madras and Mylapore and Patrick Daniel Koroma, Bishop of Kenema.

On 18 July 2015, Pope Francis appointed Bishop Henry Aruna as Auxiliary Bishop of Kenema and Titular Bishop of Nasbinca. When Bishop Patrick Daniel Koroma died on 14 December 2018, Bishop Henry Aruna was appointed to succeed him as bishop at Kenema, effective 26 January 2019. He continues to administer the diocese as the local ordinary.

== See also ==
- Catholic Church in Sierra Leone

== Succession table ==
Catholic Church titles
Preceded by Patrick Daniel Koroma (26 April 2002 - 14 December 2018)	Bishop of Kenema (since 26 January 2019)	Succeeded by Incumbent
Unknown	Auxiliary Bishop of Kenema (18 July 2015 - 26 January 2019)	Unknown
Titular church created	Titular Bishop of Nasbinca (18 July 2015 - 26 January 2019)	Unknown
Preceded by Giorgio Biguzzi (17 November 1986 - 7 January 2012)	Bishop of Makeni (7 Jan 2012 - 18 July 2015)	Succeeded by Bob John Hassan Koroma (since 11 February 2023)
