= List of Catholic dioceses in the Gambia and Sierra Leone =

The Catholic Church in the Gambia and Sierra Leone, two Anglophone (ex-British) West African countries, is composed solely of a Latin hierarchy, comprising:

- one ecclesiastical province, covering all and only Sierra Leone,
  comprising the Metropolitan of capital Freetown and three suffragan dioceses.
- an exempt diocese (directly dependent on the Holy See) for all the Gambia, with see in its capital Banjul.

There are no Eastern Catholic or pre-diocesan jurisdictions or overlapping ordinariates.

Neither country has a national Episcopal Conference, but they form a joint one for the Gambia and Sierra Leone, which hosts it in Freetown.

There are no titular sees. All defunct jurisdictions are precursors of present sees.

There formally is an Apostolic Nunciature (embassy-level papal diplomatic representation) to Sierra Leone and an Apostolic Nunciature to The Gambia, but both are vested in the Apostolic Nunciature to Liberia (in its capital Monrovia).

== Current Latin dioceses ==
=== In The Gambia ===
- Diocese of Banjul (exempt)

=== In Sierra Leone: Ecclesiastical Province of Freetown ===
- Metropolitan Archdiocese of Freetown
  - Diocese of Kenema
  - Diocese of Makeni
  - Diocese of Bo.

== See also ==
- List of Catholic dioceses (structured view)
- Catholic Church in the Gambia
- Catholic Church in Sierra Leone

== Sources and external links ==
- GCatholic - Episcopal conference
- GCatholic.org - Gambia
- GCatholic.org - Senegal.
- Catholic-Hierarchy entry.
