= Edward Tamba Charles =

Sierra Leonean Roman Catholic prelate (born 1956)

The Most Reverend Edward Tamba Charles
- Archbishop of Freetown, Sierra Leone
- Church: Catholic Church
- Archdiocese: Roman Catholic Archdiocese of Freetown
- See: Freetown
- Appointed: 15 March 2008
- Installed: 14 May 2008
- Predecessor: Joseph Henry Ganda
- Successor: Incumbent
- Other post: Archbishop of the Roman Catholic Archdiocese of Freetown and Bo (15 March 2008 - 15 January 2011)

Orders
- Ordination: 4 April 1986
- Consecration: 14 May 2008 by George Antonysamy
- Rank: Archbishop

Personal details
- Born: Edward Tamba Charles; 18 April 1956 (age 69) Kainkordu, Diocese of Kenema, Sierra Leone
- Motto: "Duc In Ultum" (“Go deeper into your inner spiritual life”)

Styles of Edward Tamba Charles
- Reference style: Your Lordship; The Most Reverend
- Spoken style: His Lordship
- Religious style: Archbishop

Edward Tamba Charles (born 18 April 1956) is a Sierra Leonean Catholic prelate who is the Archbishop of the Roman Catholic Archdiocese of Freetown, Sierra Leone since 15 January 2011. Before that, from 15 March 2008 until 15 January 2011, he was the archbishop of the Roman Catholic Archdiocese of Freetown and Bo, in Sierra Leone. He was appointed archbishop on 15 March 2008 by Pope Benedict XVI and was consecrated at Freetown on 14 May 2008. When the Roman Catholic Diocese of Bo was erected on 15 January 2011, he became Archbishop of Freetown.

== Background and education ==
He was born on 18 April 1956, at Kainkordu, Diocese of Kenema, Eastern Province, Sierra Leone. He studied at Saint Kizito Minor Seminary in Kenema in 1977. He then studied at the Saint Paul's Major Seminary in Gbarnga, in Gbarnga, Bong County, Liberia from 1978 until 1985. He studied at the Pontifical Gregorian University in Rome, Italy from 1991 until 1996, where he graduated with a Licentiate in dogmatic theology. He was ordained a priest on 4 April 1986.

== Priesthood ==
On 4 April 1986, he was ordained a priest of the Diocese of Kenema, Sierra Leone. He served in that capacity until 15 March 2008.

While a priest, he served in various roles and locations including:

- Vice-Administrator for the Cathedral of St. Paul from 1986 until 1989.
- Professor of Philosophy at St. Paul's Major Seminary, Gbarnga, Liberia from 1989 until 1991.
- Vice-rector of St. Paul's Major Seminary, Makeni, Sierra Leone from 1996 until 1998.
- Acting Rector of St. Paul's Major Seminary Freetown, Sierra Leone from 1998 until 2002.
- Rector of St. Paul's Major Seminary, Freetown, Sierra Leone from 2002 until 2008.

== As bishop ==
Pope Benedict XVI appointed him as Archbishop of the Roman Catholic Archdiocese of Freetown and Bo on 15 March 2008. He was consecrated and installed at Freetown, Sierra Leone on 14 May 2008 by the hands of Archbishop George Antonysamy, Titular Archbishop of Sulci assisted by Bishop Patrick Daniel Koroma, Bishop of Kenema and Bishop Giorgio Biguzzi, Bishop of Makeni. As of January 2025, he was the president of the Interreligious Council Sierra Leone (IRCSL) and chairman of the Catholic Bishops in Sierra Leone.

== See also ==
- Catholic Church in Sierra Leone

== Succession table ==
Catholic Church titles
Preceded by Joseph Henry Ganda (4 September 1980 - 22 March 2007)	Archbishop of Freetown (since 15 March 2008)	Succeeded by Incumbent
