= Holy Ghost Missionary College, Kimmage Manor, Dublin =

Irish Catholic seminary (1917–1991)

The Holy Ghost Missionary College
- Other name: Kimmage Manor
- Type: Private, seminary
- Active: 1917–1991
- Religious affiliation: Holy Ghost Fathers (Spiritans)
- Academic affiliations: NCEA (1979-1991); Maynooth College
- Location: Kimmage, Ireland
- Campus: Urban
- Website: https://spiritan.ie/

The Holy Ghost Missionary College, in Kimmage in Dublin, Ireland, colloquially known as Kimmage Manor, is a Holy Ghost Fathers (Spiritans) institution that has served as a seminary training missionary priests and spawned two other institutions, the Kimmage Mission Institute and the Kimmage Development Studies Centre. The college church, The Church of the Holy Spirit (Kimmage Manor) serves as a parish church.

== History ==
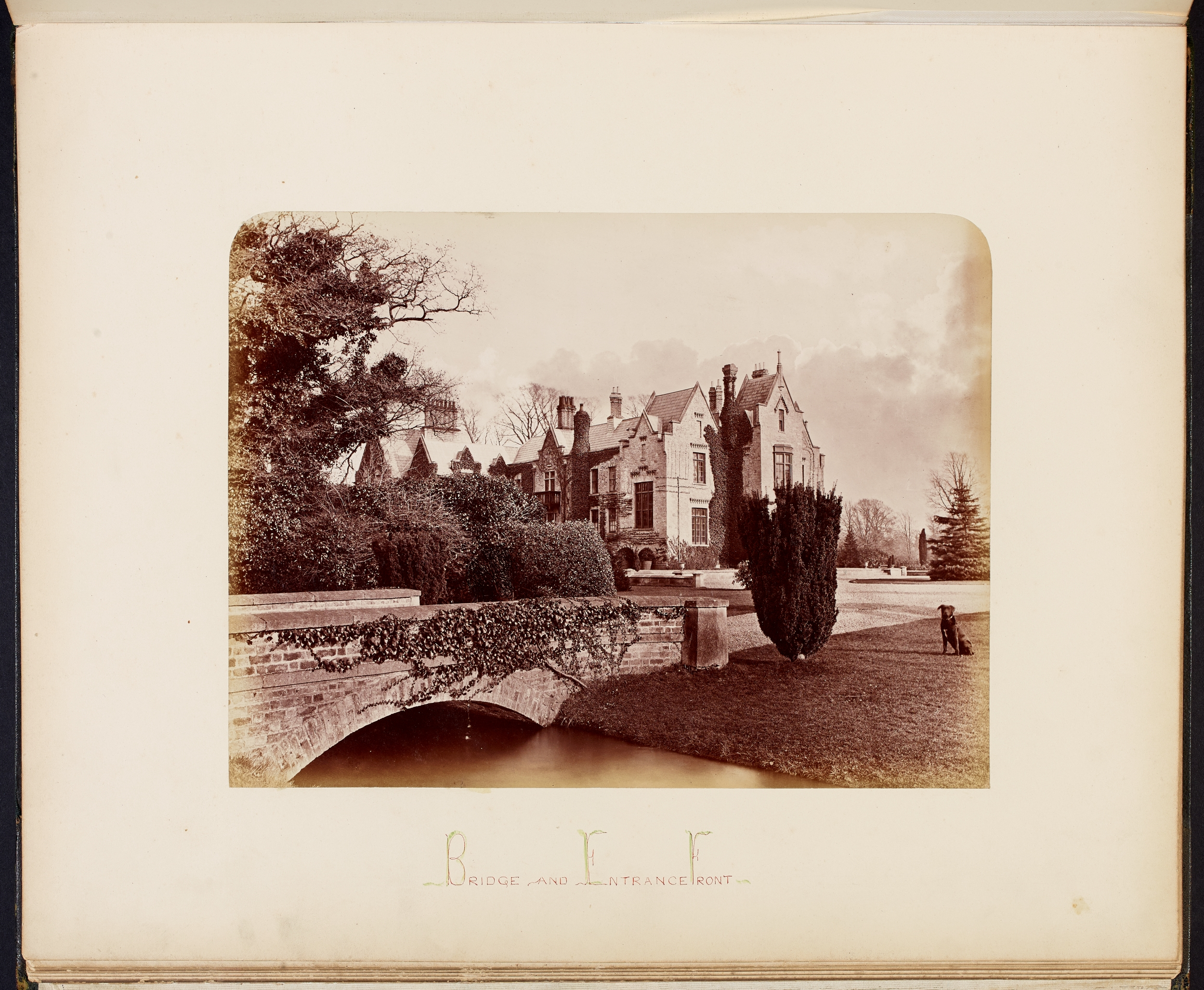
Kimmage House entrance front circa 1870

Kimmage Manor, with 69 acres of land, was bought by the Spiritans (under Provincial Fr. John Tuohill Murphy), in 1911. It was bought from a Mrs Mary Ida Clayton who had a perpetual lease of the property and had lived in the house since at least 1898 with her two sons. The freehold of the property along with many others in the area had been owned by the Shaw family since at least 1829.

Initially it acted as a novitiate where students pursued philosophy studies with the National University of Ireland (UCD). It developed into a seminary where students, studied theology and philosophy at Kimmage, while also taking civil degrees in University College Dublin. Students were trained to serve abroad, particularly in Nigeria.

In 1917 the Faculty of Theology for Irish Holy Ghost Fathers, which had been based in Chevilly, near Paris, opened in Kimmage Manor with 29 students. From 1924 until 1933, the Holy Ghost Fathers studied theology at Blackrock Castle, before returning to Kimmage Manor. In 1917 the House of Philosophy moved to St Mary's College, Rathmines, Dublin, then in 1926 it moved to Blackrock College, before moving back to Kimmage in 1938. Kilshane House, County Tipperary, operated as a junior novitiate from 1933 to 1983, with students moving to Kimmage to complete their studies.

In 1939 the Kimmage Manor Church was opened on the college campus. In 1959 the Mission House opened which would serve as a retirement home and accommodation for those returning from the missions. During the tenure of Kimmage alumnus Archbishop John Charles McQuaid, he conducted ordinations of priests trained at Kimmage, in Clonliffe College Chapel. During his tenure as superior of the order, Archbishop Marcel Lefebvre who would later lead a schism from Rome, ordained Spiritan priests in Kimmage. The Mission House opened in Kimmage in 1959.

In 1974 under Rev. Dr. Liam Carey, the adult education department was set up; this evolved from 1977 under Fr. Richard (Dick) F. Quinn C.S.Sp., into the Development Studies Centre. In the 1970s students from other orders (e.g. Redemptorists from Marianella) and lay people began to be trained in Kimmage, also in the 1980s students of the Bachelor of Divinity course were allowed to sit for degrees from the Pontifical University Maynooth. In 1979 Kimmage became one of the five private providers recognised by the Irish Government's HETAC forerunner the National Council for Education Awards (NCEA), providing accreditation for some of its certificate and diploma courses. In 1990, the college church became the Kimmage Manor Parish Church.

In the 1970s and 1980s, student numbers went down; part of the land was sold off, while another part was used to establish a retirement and nursing home for retired missionaries.

The Congregation of the Holy Spirit Graveyard, which was on the campus, is now separated from Kimmage Manor. Following land sales and development, it is located at Wainsfort Manor Grove. The Spiritans new graveyard is located in Dardistown, County Dublin.

== Kimmage Development Studies Centre ==
The Development Studies Centre, was founded in 1974, as part of the Faculty of Theology, and operated until 2018 when it was merged into Maynooth University as its Development Studies Department. The development studies programme grew out of the fourth-year pastoral theology course at Kimmage, which seminarians took.

== Kimmage Mission Institute ==
The Kimmage Mission Institute of Theology and Cultures (KNI), was founded in Kimmage in 1991 (in association with other Irish missionary congregations), the Institute moved to Milltown Institute of Theology and Philosophy in 2003. The institute formally merged with Milltown in 2006.

== Spiritan Mission Resource and Heritage Centre ==
Kimmage Manor is now the location of the Spiritan Mission Resource and Heritage Centre. Buring Embers is an annual magazine produced by the Spiritans in Kimmage. In 2012 the Spiritan promotions office moved from St. Mary's to Kimmage. The Spiritan Education Trust (SET) formerly the Des Places Education trust which manages the Spiritian interests in its ten schools is based in Kimmage. A Partnership with African (APA) is based in Kimmage Manor. The Irish Cultural Orientation Course, for foreign priests and trainee priests practicing in Ireland is run from Kimmage. The Spiritan Retreat Centre, in Ardbraccan (An Tobar), County Meath now serves as a House of Formation.

Training for Transformation (TfT) which has worked with the Spiritans and with the Development studies centre, is based in Kimmage Manor.

== Notable people ==
- Archbishop Thomas Joseph Brosnahan C.S.Sp. (1905–1996) was Archbishop of Freetown and Bo in Sierra Leone
- Bishop Eugene Joseph Butler C.S.Sp., served as Bishop of Zanzibar (1957–1964) and Bishop of Mombasa (1964–1978), buried in Spiritan plot in Kimmage.
- Bishop Michael J. Cleary C.S.Sp., Bishop of Banjul, Gambia.
- Bishop Robert Patrick Ellison C.S.Sp., Bishop of Banjul, Gambia.
- Fr. Denis Fahey (1883–1954), founder of Maria Duce, served as a Senior Scholasticate at Kimmage in 1912
- Fr. Aengus Finucane, missionary, one of the founders of Concern Worldwide
- Fr. Jack Finucane, missionary, brother of Aengus, one of the founders of Concern Worldwide
- Bishop Malcolm Patrick Galt C.S.Sp, Trinidadian-born Bishop of the diocese of Bridgetown, Barbados (1995–2005), completed theology studies in Kimmage
- Fr. Francis Griffin C.S.Sp., first non-French Superior General of the Spiritans
- Archbishop Charles Heerey C.S.Sp., Archbishop of Onitsha, Nigeria
- Archbishop Ambrose Kelly C.S.Sp, served as Archbishop of Freetown and Bo, in Sierre Leone.
- Mor Gregorios Kuriakose BD, is a Syriac Orthodox bishop, currently Suffragan bishop of the Knanaya Archdiocese
- Fr. Edward Leen C.S.Sp., DD, served as president of Blackrock College and superior in Kimmage.
- Bishop James Leen C.S.Sp. (1888–1949), brother of Edward, served as Bishop of Port Louis in Mauritius.
- Bishop Daniel Liston C.S.Sp., (1900–1986), served a Bishop of Port Louis in Mauritius from 1949 until 1968, buried in Spiritan plot in Kimmage.
- Bishop John Joseph McCarthy C.S.Sp., Bishop of Nairobi, Kenya
- Archbishop John Charles McQuaid C.S.Sp., Archbishop of Dublin (1940–1972)
- Don Mullan, the humanitarian and media producer, studied Development Studies at Kimmage.
- Rev. Michael O'Carroll CSSp, DD, writer and teacher
- Very Rev. Patrick F. O'Carroll CSSp, DD, Provincial-Superior, brother of Michael
- Cardinal Maurice Piat CSSp, GCSK, Mauritian born, Archbishop of Port Louis, Mauritius
