= Denmark–Tanzania relations =

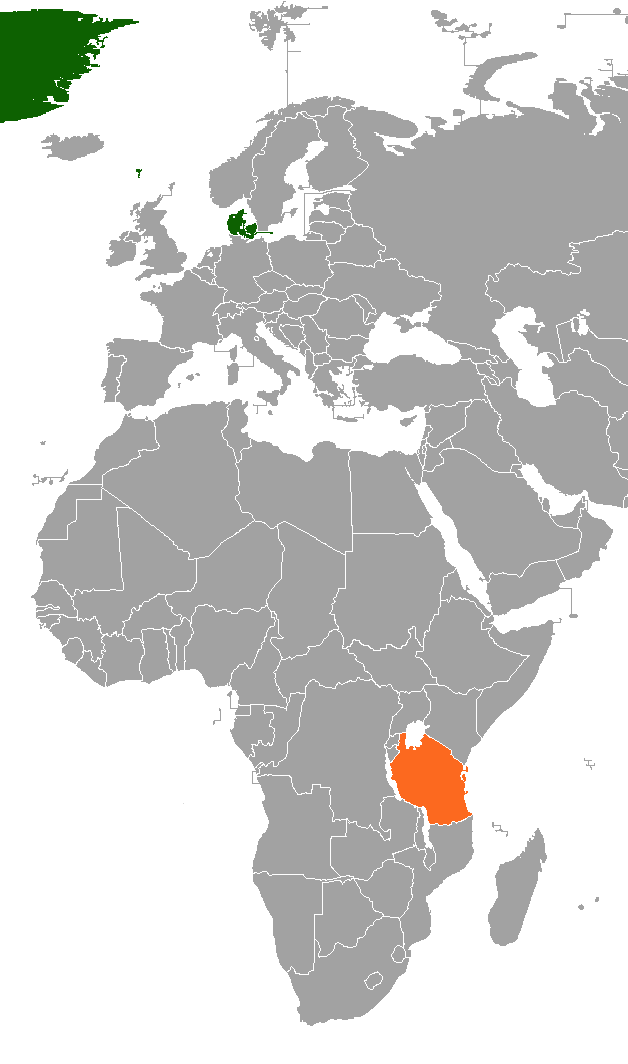
- Denmark: Tanzania

Denmark–Tanzania relations refers to the current and historical relations between Denmark and Tanzania. Denmark has an embassy in Dar es Salaam. Tanzania is represented in Denmark, through its embassy in Stockholm, Sweden. Tanzania has an honorary consulate in Denmark.

== History ==
Tanzania was the first African country with which Denmark initiated diplomatic relations, in 1963. This was shortly after the Tanzanian mainland, called Tangayika, became independent.

Throughout the years of cooperation, the main objective of the Denmark has been to contribute to Tanzania’s struggle against its massive poverty: the country is today one of the most stable and peaceful democracies in Africa and it is one of the world’s 20 fastest growing economies.

Right after the start of the diplomatic relations, Denmark and Tangayika (together with the governments of Sweden, Finland and Norway) initiated the Nordic-Tangayika project (later KEC) in Kibaha. In 1970, the Government of Denmark handed over the project to Julius Nyerere, President of Tanzania.

The Kibaha Project marks a recognition by the Nordic peoples of the unity of man. It shows a practical recognition that the wealthier nations of the world have a responsibility to contribute to the development of the poorer nations on terms which recognize human equality and human dignity.

— Julius Nyerere In January 1970

== Assistance to Tanzania ==
Danish assistance in Tanzania amounted 500 million DKK in 2010. Denmark will focus on these areas: business environment, public health, management of natural resources, budget support, democracy, good governance, Public administration, cooperation between Tanzanian and Danish companies and Refugees. Denmark also supports Burundian and Congolese refugees in Tanzania.

== Trade ==
All imports from Tanzania to Denmark are duty-free and quota-free, with the exception of armaments, as part of the Everything but Arms initiative of the European Union.

== High-level visits ==
On 5 February 1991, Tanzanian President Julius Nyerere visited the Mellemfolkeligt Samvirke in Denmark. Danish Prime Minister Anders Fogh Rasmussen visited Tanzania in 2005. Tanzanian President Jakaya Kikwete visited Denmark in 2007, and again on 5 May 2009.

== See also ==
- Foreign relations of Denmark
- Foreign relations of Tanzania
