= Don Mullan =

Irish author (born 1956)

- Born: 1956 (age 69–70); Derry
- Education: Ulster University
- Occupations: Author; humanitarian; media producer

Don Mullan (born 1956, Derry, Northern Ireland) is an Irish author and media producer. His book Eyewitness Bloody Sunday is officially recognised as a primary catalyst for a new Bloody Sunday inquiry, which became the longest-running and most expensive in British legal history. Mullan, who is dyslexic, has spoken widely and was co-producer of a highly acclaimed and multi-award-winning film about Bloody Sunday that was inspired by his book.

== Early life and education ==
Mullan was born in Derry, Northern Ireland, in 1956 and attended St. Eugene's Primary School, St Joseph's Boys' School, St. Patrick's College, Kiltegan, County Wicklow; St. Kieran's College, Kilkenny; Ulster Polytechnic; Holy Ghost College(Development Studies), Dublin; and Iona College, New Rochelle, New York.

== Action From Ireland ==
Mullan was Director of AFrI (Action from Ireland) between 1979 and 1993, during which he and his colleagues developed the Great Famine Project. He was one of the first in the Irish world to recognise the approaching 150th anniversary of The Great Famine (The Great Hunger) as "a unique historical moment". AFrI's project helped to generate awareness of the anniversary all over Ireland and throughout the world. Mullan established a "famine walk" in County Mayo, commemorating an actual walk of starving Irish peasants in 1848. The walk attracted the attention of ABC, NBC and CBS News during its first three years, 1988–90. The walk continues as an annual event. As part of the project Mullan established several connections with the Choctaw Nation of Oklahoma and was made an Honorary Chief. The Great Famine Project was multi-disciplined and involved publications, documentaries, dramas and commemorative events including the marking of forgotten mass Famine graves containing the sacred remains of thousands of Irish victims.

== St. Brigid's Peace Cross and St. Brigid's Fire ==
With five young boys from Derry, Mullan founded in 1983 the St. Brigid's Peace Cross and was instrumental in having St. Brigid's Fire in Kildare permanently rekindled on 1 February 2006. The fire had burned in Kildare for over a thousand years before it was extinguished during the Protestant Reformation.

== Humanitarian work ==
Mullan worked for the humanitarian agency Concern Worldwide from 1994 until 1996, during which he visited Rwanda and the refugee camps in Zaire. He also worked in Brazil, from 1983 to 1984, during which he organised famine relief to the north-east of the country.

Mullan was detained at Johannesburg and refused entry into apartheid South Africa in 1985. In 1994 he attended the inauguration of President Nelson Mandela as the guest of Archbishop Desmond Tutu in recognition of his work on behalf of the anti-apartheid movement. Mullan was invited by Archbishop Tutu to attend a symposium on Robben Island in May 1994, the week following the inauguration of President Mandela. The symposium addressed the future use of Robben Island in a new South Africa and Mullan was invited to address the gathering concerning his own work on harnessing the memory of the Great Irish 'Famine' (1845–1849) in fighting injustice and oppression today.

== Concern Universal – Children in Crossfire ==
In 1996, the late Allo Donnelly, then Chairman of Concern Universal, a UK-based World Development charity wishing to expand into Ireland, approached Mullan and asked him to head up the operation. By then Mullan had begun his career in investigative journalism and declined the offer. However, he strongly recommended a Derry-based friend, Richard Moore, for the position. Moore had participated in Mullan's re-enactment of the Choctaw Nations 'Trail of Tears' charity walk from Oklahoma to Mississippi in 1992, during which Mullan spoke to him extensively about his humanitarian work with AFrI. During his meeting with Allo Donnelly, Mullan recalled Moore's expressed desire to do similar work. Moore was interviewed for the position and subsequently employed by Concern Universal, setting up the Irish section of the charity as 'Children in Crossfire', named after a BBC documentary of the same name that had featured Moore in 1974. In 2006 'Children in Crossfire' separated from Concern Universal and is now an independent Development Agency in Ireland.

== Dyslexia ==
Mullan was diagnosed with dyslexia in 1994, and is a member of the International Dyslexia Association. He has authored and edited several books and documentaries and acted as co-producer and associate producer in three award-winning movies Bloody Sunday Omagh, and Five Minutes of Heaven. In April 2004 he was keynote speaker at an International Symposium on dyslexia in Dublin.

== Bloody Sunday ==
At the age of 15, Mullan witnessed the events of Bloody Sunday in Derry. He was participating in his first Civil Rights March. His 1997 best-selling book Eyewitness Bloody Sunday was instrumental in Prime Minister Tony Blair's 1998 decision to establish a new Bloody Sunday Inquiry. The Inquiry opened on 27 March 2000. It was the longest and most expensive Inquiry in British legal history. The results were published on 15 June 2010. British Prime Minister David Cameron addressed the House of Commons that afternoon where he acknowledged, among other things, that the paratroopers had fired the first shot, had fired on fleeing unarmed civilians, and shot and killed one man who was already wounded. He then apologised on behalf of the British Government.

Mullan was co-producer, source writer, and actor in the 2002 award-winning Granada/Hell's Kitchen movie Bloody Sunday, directed by Paul Greengrass, which was partly inspired by his book.

== Public Speaking ==
As a public speaker Mullan has addressed audiences throughout Ireland, Britain, Europe, Canada, Brazil, and the United States on justice, peace and human rights issues. Amongst the colleges and universities which Mullan has spoken at are: Harvard University, Massachusetts (2004), Villanova University, Pennsylvania (2004), Georgetown University, Washington, DC (2003), Seattle University, Washington (2002) and Notre Dame University, Indiana (2001). In 1986 the Irish American Cultural Organisation described his lecture tour on the Great Hunger as "one of the most successful in recent years."

== Gordon Banks ==
In 2006, Mullan published a boyhood memoir entitled 'Gordon Banks – A Hero Who Could Fly' in which he outlines the extraordinary influence for good that Gordon Banks, the 1966 England World Cup winning goalkeeper, had on his life. Gordon Banks travelled to Ireland to launch the book. Consequently, Mullan and Banks became close friends. Through Banks' Stoke City FC colleague, Terry Conroy, Mullan was introduced to sculptor Andrew Edwards. Edwards, Carl Payne and Julian Jeffery created the triple statue honouring the Stoke City and England legendary winger, Sir Stanley Matthews. Mullan travelled all over England in a quest to find a sculptor to help him create the first monument in the Western World to a goalkeeper. This included viewing several of the sporting monuments of Sir Philip Jackson. None moved him like the Matthews monument.

Mullan was successful in getting the iconic Brazilian soccer star, Pelé, and his longstanding friend, Archbishop Desmond Tutu of South Africa, to agree to unveil the first phase of the monument at the Britannia Stadium on 12 July 2008. The unveiling also included a Gordon Banks XI vs. Pelé XI celebrity charity football match, with Tutu acting as assistant manager to Pelé. The game celebrated the choice of South Africa and Brazil for the 2010 and 2014 World Cups.

== Awards ==
He has received Honorary Degrees from Iona College, New Rochelle, New York (1997) Mount Aloysius College, Cresson, Pennsylvania (2001) and DePaul University, Chicago, Illinois (2011). In March 1998, he was grand marshal of the San Diego St. Patrick's Day Parade. On 9 December 2002, Mullan received A Defender of Human Dignity Award from the International League for Human Rights at the United Nations, New York. In October 2003 he received from the Ancient Order of Hibernians of America the Sean MacBride Humanitarian Award. In May 1990, Mullan was made an Honorary Chief of the Choctaw Nation of Oklahoma, an honour he shares with the former President of Ireland, Mary Robinson. In 2011, he received an honorary doctorate from DePaul University in Chicago.

Mullan has been published in The Irish Times, the Irish Independent, Ireland on Sunday, the Sunday Tribune, The Examiner, Magill Magazine, la Repubblica, The Times (London), The Guardian, Journal do Brasil and Irish America.

== Books ==
- A Glimmer of Light – Great Hunger Commemorative Events in Ireland and around the World (9780952450603 Concern Worldwide, 1995)
- Blood, Sweat & Tears (9781889195148 Smart Art Pr, 1997)
- Eyewitness Bloody Sunday – The Truth (Wolfhound Press, Dublin 1997, Roberts Rinehart Publishers, USA; 9781903582169 3rd edition published by Merlin Publishing 2002)
- The Dublin and Monaghan Bombings – The Truth, The Questions and the Victims' Stories, (0863277195 Wolfhound Press, 2000)
- A Gift of Roses – the visit to Ireland of the relics of St. Thérèse of Lisieux (0863278914 Wolfhound Press 2001)
- Contacted – Testimonies of people who say the dead are alive and have been in touch (9781856354783 Mercier Press, 2005)
- Gordon Banks: A Hero Who Could Fly (9780954704735 A little book company, 2006)
- Speaking Truth to Power: The Donal De Roiste Affair (9781856079082 Curragh Books, Ireland, 2006)
- The Prophesy of Robert Louis Stevenson: Damien of Molokai - The Leper Saint (9781906077051 Editor, a little book company, 2009)
- The Boy Who Wanted to Fly - with a foreword by Pele and Archbishop Desmond Tutu (9781907756016 Legend Press, 2010)
- The Narrative of the Life of Frederick Douglass - an American Slave, with a foreword by President of Ireland, Mary McAleese. (978-1906077105 Editor, a little book company, 2011)
- The Rose and the Thorn, with Audrey Healy, stories based on a dinner-time game of the Obama family, (1906077096 a little book company, 2011)
- Scamming the Scammers, a humorous but serious book on internet email scams (9781909395749 Paperbooks Ltd, 2014)

=== Little Book Series ===
- A Little Book of St. Thérèse of Lisieux (9781856073738 Columba Press, 2002)
- A Little Book of St. Francis of Assisi (9781856073745 Columba Press, 2002)
- A Little Book of St. Anthony of Padua (1-85607-410-2 Columba Press, 2003)
- A Little Book of St. Pio of Pietrelcina (9781856074094 Columba Press, 2003)
- A Little Book of St. John of the Cross (9780819845085 Columba Press, 2003)
- A Little Book of St. Teresa of Avila (9780819845092 Columba Press, 2003)
- The Little Book of Mother Teresa of Calcutta (9781856074285 Columba Press, 2003)
- Little Book of Blessed Mother Teresa (9780819845023 Pauline Books & Media, 2000)
- A Little Book of St Anthony (Little Book of Saints) (9781856074100 Columba Press, 2004)
- A Little Book of St. Patrick (9781856074261 Columba Press, 2004)
- A Little Book of St. Faustina (9781856074926 Columba Press, 2005)
- The Little Book of Archbishop Oscar Romero (9780954704711 A Little Book Company, 2005)
- The Little Book of Catherine of Dublin (9780954704759 A Little Book Company, 2005)
- The Little Book of St. Louise and St. Vincent (9780954704766 A Little Book Company, 2005)

== Documentaries ==
- Between 1999 and 2002 Mullan made a series of ten television documentaries for Ireland's TV3 flagship current affairs programme, 20/20, covering the following themes:
1. Sr. Helen Prejean and the Death Penalty
2. Kim Phuc (The little girl burning with napalm in the 1972 iconic Vietnam photograph) visits Richard Moore and Clare Gallagher (who lost her eyesight in the 1998 Omagh Bomb)
3. In the Game of the Father (European Champion boxer, Charlie Nash, and his sons)
4. The Murder of Seamus Ludlow
5. The Dublin and Monaghan Bombings (Part 1)
6. The Dublin and Monaghan Bombings (Part 2)
7. Bloody Sunday: The Right to Truth (Part 1)
8. Bloody Sunday: (Part 2)
9. Dr. Deirdre Killelea of The Panda Foundation (Helping children with ADHD)
10. Millvina Dean, Titanic Survivor
- Executive Producer An Unreliable Witness (Grace Pictures, USA).
- Executive Producer 'Gols Pela Vida' [Goals for Life] (Instituto de Pesquisa PELE Pequeno Principe, 2008), in which he negotiated the support of Gordon Banks in the promotion of 1283 Gold, Silver and Bronze laser numbered coins (representing the number of goals scored by the legendary Pele in his football career), produced by the Brazilian Mint, to support the work of the Hospital Pequeno Principe, Curitiba, Brazil, the biggest children's hospital in Latin America. It is a short 45-second advertising film promoting the coins which features Banks' iconic save from Pele during the 1970 Mexico World Cup.

== Films ==
- Co-Producer Bloody Sunday (Hells Kitchen/Granada) 2002. Bloody Sunday at IMDb Winner of Sundance and Berlin Film Festivals, inspired by Eyewitness Bloody Sunday.
- Co-Producer Omagh Omagh at IMDb (Hells Kitchen/Channel Four) 2004. Winner of San Sabastian and Toronto Film Festivals.
- Associate Producer Five Minutes of Heaven Five Minutes of Heaven at IMDb (BBC/Element Films/Bord Scannán na hÉirean/the Irish Film Board) 2009
- That Save (Working Title) BBC Drama and Hat Trick Productions, London, (Optioned), based on book Gordon Banks: A Hero Who Could Fly.
