= John C. O'Riordan =

John C. O’Riordan C.S.Sp., COR
- Bishop Emeritus of the Diocese of Kenema
- Church: St. Paul’s Cathedral
- Diocese: Kenema
- See: Kenema
- Elected: June 4, 1984
- In office: December 2, 1984
- Retired: April 26, 2002
- Predecessor: Joseph Henry Ganda
- Successor: Patrick Daniel Koroma
- Other posts: Prelate, President of Inter-territorial Catholic Bishops' Conference of The Gambia and Sierra Leone

Orders
- Ordination: June 29, 1952
- Consecration: by Archbishop Joseph Henry Ganda

Personal details
- Born: John Christopher O’Riordan, Effin, County Limerick, Ireland
- Died: Dublin, Ireland
- Buried: Dardistown, County Dublin, Ireland
- Denomination: Roman Catholic Church
- Parents: David O'Riordan and Mary Murphy
- Profession: Catholic Priest
- Education: Blackrock College, Kilshane Novitiate

Styles of John C. O'Riordan
- Reference style: His Excellency; The Most Reverend
- Spoken style: Your Excellency
- Religious style: Bishop

The Most Reverend John Christopher O'Riordan, Bishop Emeritus, C.S.Sp., COR (6 January 1924 – 22 November 2016) was Bishop of the Catholic Diocese of Kenema in Sierra Leone.

== Early life ==
He was the second youngest son of Mary (née Murphy) and David O'Riordan and he was born in Effin, County Limerick, Ireland. His father managed a creamery in Kilmallock. His mother was a school teacher. He had eight brothers and sisters, two of whom became also priests.

From 1937 to 1943, he boarded in County Dublin at Blackrock College, founded and administered by the Spiritan Order.

== Priestly life ==
He entered the Holy Ghost Fathers at Kilshane Novitiate in Tipperary in 1943. His ordination took place in 1952.

=== Ministry in Sierra Leone ===
In 1953, he was sent to Sierra Leone where he began a ministry that would last for almost 50 years.

As a young priest, he drove along the dirt roads to remote villages where he got to know the residents and said Mass with them. He developed relationships with the local paramount chiefs and elders and soon came to see Sierra Leone as a place where he had always belonged.

His practical approach involved training community workers as well as the establishment of hospitals, schools and pastoral centers. He was often involved with every aspect of the building process from mixing concrete to physical construction.

A skilled diplomat, he deftly navigated an interfaith community in which Christians were the minority.

=== Bishop of Kenema ===
He was appointed bishop of the Diocese of Kenema on June 4, 1984, and consecrated December 2, 1984.

Affectionately known as Bishop Johnny in the local community., he ordained more than twelve Sierra Leonean priests during his tenure.

From 1992 to 1995 he served as President of Inter-territorial Catholic Bishops' Conference of The Gambia and Sierra Leone.

=== Sierra Leone Civil War ===
The Sierra Leone Civil War began in 1991 when the Revolutionary United Front attempted to overthrown Joseph Saidu Momoh, then president.

Bishop Johnny continued his ministry in Sierra Leone during the civil war with mass killings, mass rape, torture and the recruitment of child soldiers became widespread. He was an outspoken critic of the war and vociferously urged top officials in the military to put an end to the killing.

When the war ended in 2002, over 50 000 people had been killed.

== Honors ==
In 2001, Bishop O'Riordan was award Sierra Leone's Commander of the Order of Rokel (COR), the country's highest honor for outstanding pastoral and humanitarian services.

== Later Ministry ==
Describing Bishop Johnny's ministry, a Sierra Leone-born priest said, “He stood with us in war and walked with us in peace.”

In 2002 Bishop Johnny retired to Ireland on 26 April 2002.

== Death ==
He died peacefully at the age of 92 at Marian House in Dublin, Ireland on 22 November 2016. His funeral was held on 25 November 2016 at Church of The Holy Spirit, Kimmage Manor, Dublin. He is buried in the Spiritan plot in Dardistown, County Dublin.

=== Memorial in Sierra Leone ===
Bishop O'Riordan remains a beloved figure in Sierra Leone. On 10 February 2017, the Diocese of Kenema invited clergy from across the nation to celebrate a memorial Mass in Bishop Johnny's honor.

Edward Charles, Archbishop of Freetown gave the Eucharist and Bishop Aruna, Auxiliary Bishop of Kenema paid tribute to Bishop O'Riordan's life and ministry in the homily.

Catholic Church titles
Preceded by Joseph Henry Ganda	Bishop of Kenema; 1984–2002	Succeeded by Patrick Daniel Koroma
