= Brickens =

Village in County Mayo in Ireland

Brickens Na Broicíní
- Village and townland
- Brickeens
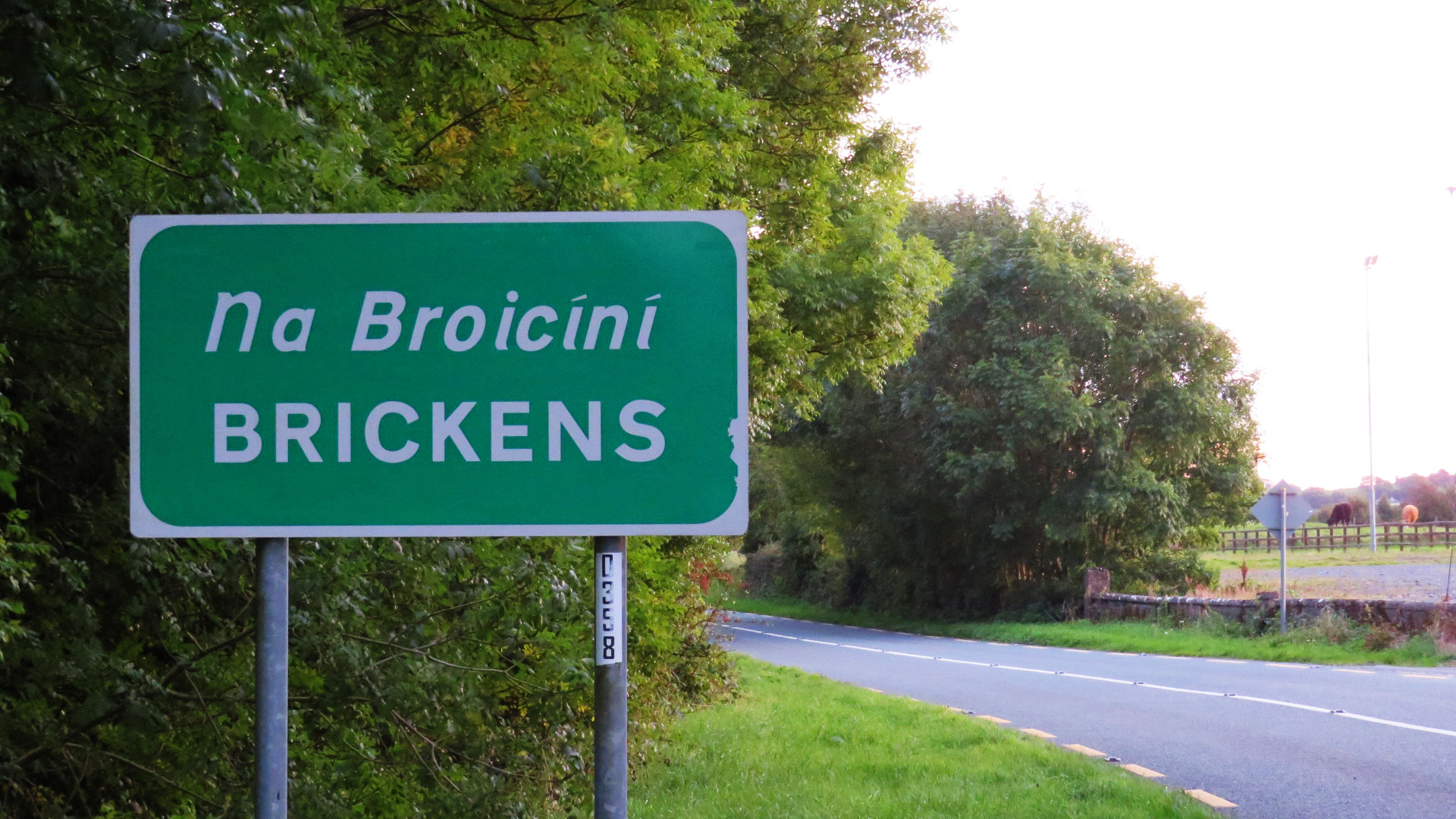
- Road sign on the N60 road at the north entrance to Brickens

- Location in Ireland
- Coordinates: 53°43′19″N 8°52′35″W
- Country: Ireland
- Province: Connacht
- County: Mayo

Government
  - Electoral division: Culnacleha
  - Dáil constituency: Mayo constituency
  - EU Parliament: Midlands–North-West

Area
  - Total: 1.4898 km^{2} (0.5752 sq mi)
- Elevation: 65.35 m (214.4 ft)
- Time zone: UTC+0 (WET)
  - Summer (DST): UTC-1 (IST (WEST))
- Irish Grid Reference: M4220375043

Brickens (Note: from Irish Na Broicíní, meaning 'the badger warrens', officially Brickeens,) is a village and townland on the N60 road between Ballyhaunis and Claremorris in southeast County Mayo in Ireland. The River Robe flows through the village which is 65 metres above sea level, and old ordnance survey maps show the townland with an area of 368 acres and 23 perches – equivalent to nearly 150 hectares.

It is in the civil parish and Catholic parish of Bekan and in the former barony of Costello. The area surrounding the village is devoted to agriculture. Brickens is a 30-kilometre drive from Ireland West Airport.

== Etymology of "Brickens" ==
The official name of the village is Brickeens but it is known locally as Brickens. The name derives from the Irish word broicíní, meaning badger warrens. The Irish word broc means badger and is related to the English word brock, also meaning badger. The Placenames Database of Ireland records that the English place name Brocklin was in use here in 1591. Brock is one of a handful of ancient words that survive from the Celtic-speaking era in Britain, and which are still in use in English today. The Irish word broicín is also a diminutive form of broc (thus, another meaning of broicíní is "little badgers"), and means a short thick-set person, a sturdy little fellow, or a dirty-faced or grizzled, grey-haired person.

== History ==
Evidence of an ancient human presence in the district exists in the form of three ringforts east of the village Community Centre, at Liscolman (officially called Liscluman), and at Lurgan, and there are many others in the surrounding region. The prefix "lis-" (lios- in Irish) in the name Liscolman means "fort".

In more recent, historical times, the local big house was at Ballinvilla Demesne, 375 metres (1,230 ft) southeast of Brickens church at the former home of the Crean family, who were transplanted from County Galway to County Mayo under the Cromwellian settlement of 1652.

The Creans settled at first in Brickens and by the mid-nineteenth century they held five townlands in the parish of Bekan and were residing at Ballinvilla. In 1876, they had an estate of 731 acres (2.96 km^{2}), but by 1916 they accepted an offer from the Congested Districts Board for the purchase of 571 acres (2.31 km^{2}) of the estate. Ballinvilla House is now demolished and a large modern home has been constructed nearby within the former demesne, but a small Crean family graveyard still exists there.

The N60 national secondary road that passes through Brickens was formerly a sand road that was tarred in 1940.

== Community ==
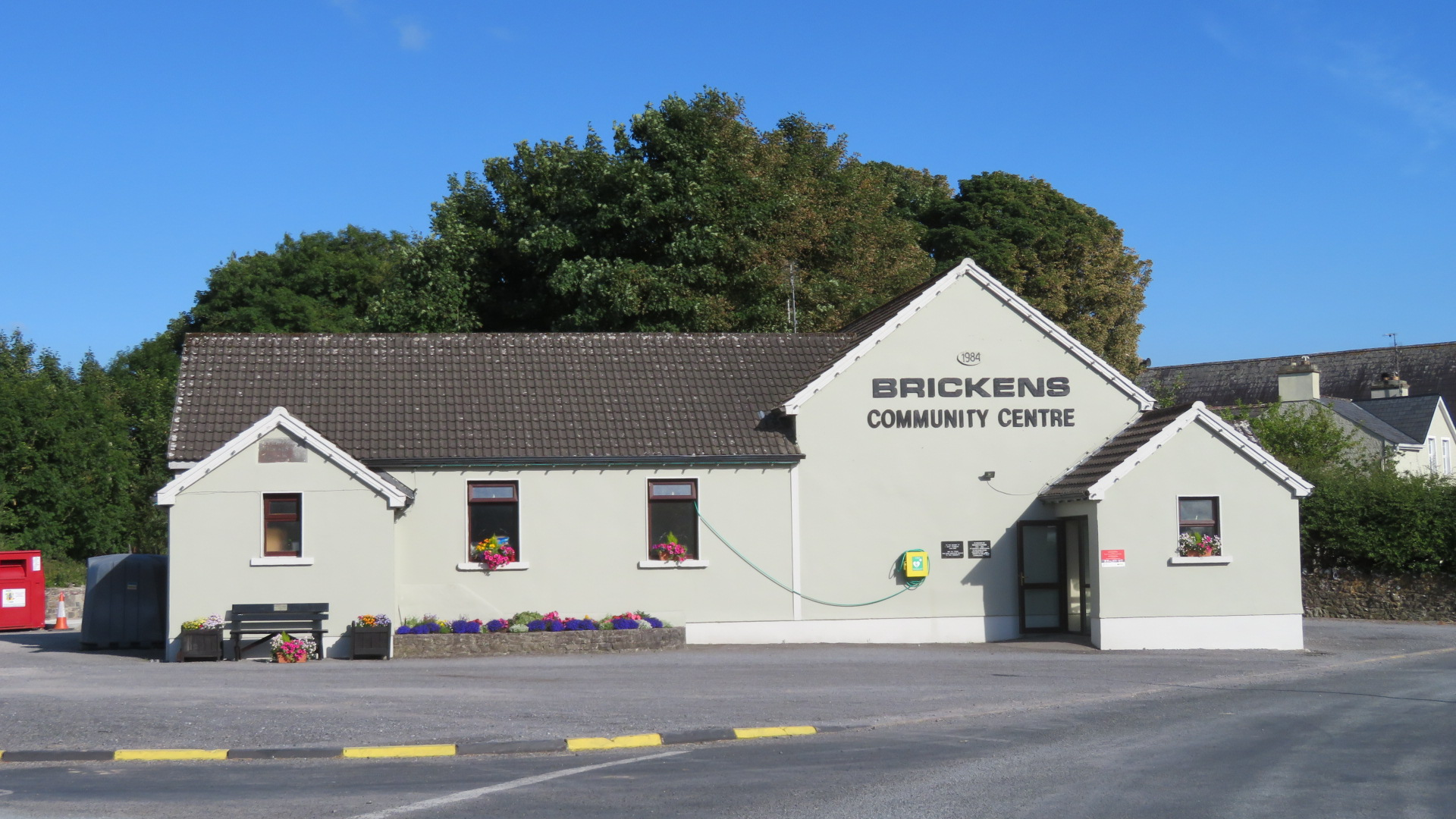
Brickens Community Centre

Social life in the village takes place at Brickens Community Centre, owned by the Diocese of Tuam, with activities ranging from adult education classes to bingo, and at the village public house and restaurant. The church of St. Therese of the Little Flower, built in 1927–8, is on the east of the village, one of the three Catholic churches in the parish of Bekan. The local cemetery for Brickens is four kilometres to the southeast in Kildarra, beside Tulrahan. The village had a sub-post office in the past but this was closed on 23 June 2005.

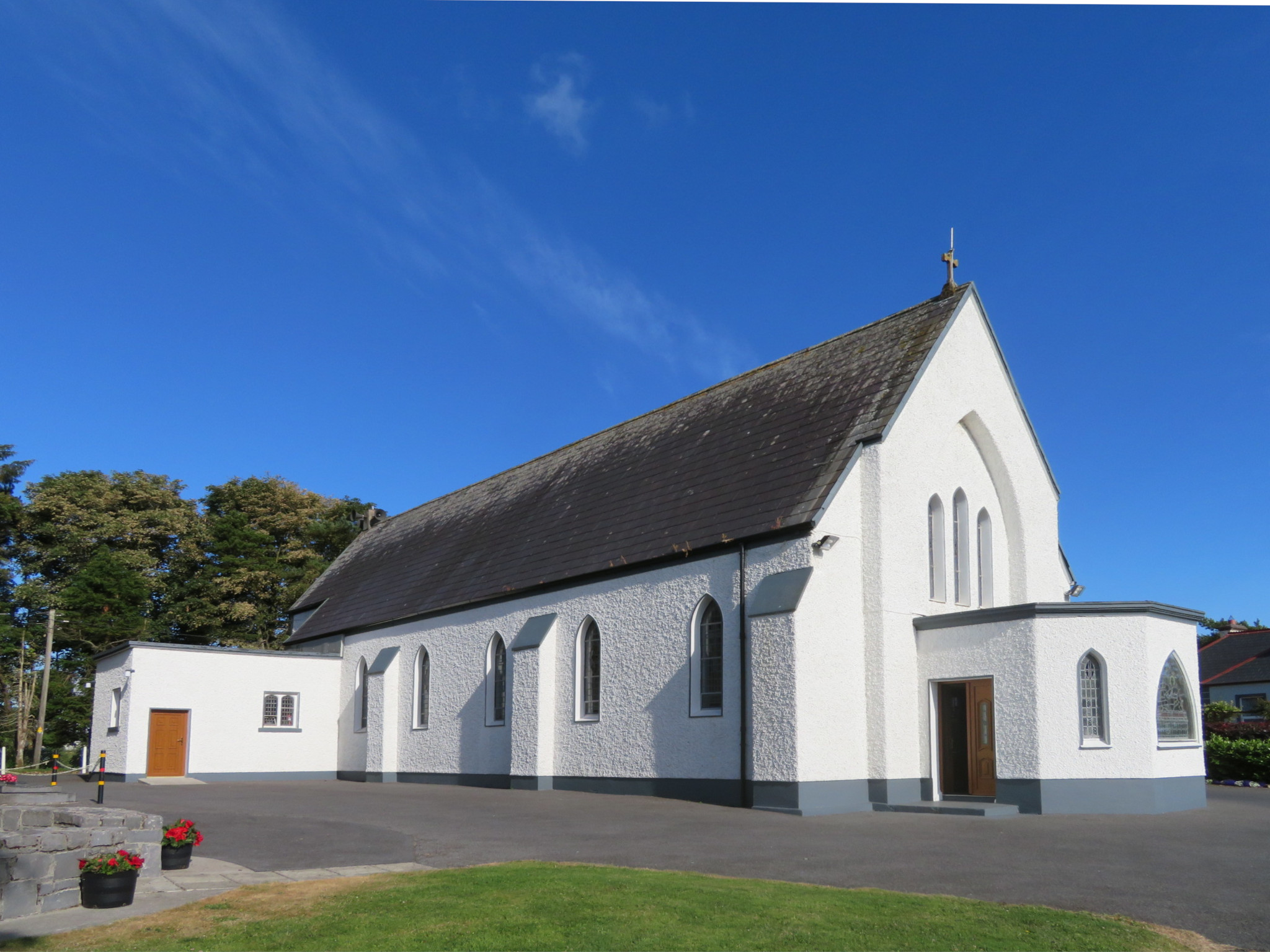
Church of Saint Therese in Brickens

The Lohan Park Group Home and Retirement Village was opened by the Minister of State for Health and Children in July 2005 at the modern Lohan Park development on the southeast of the village. It was described during an Oireachtas joint committee debate on community development in 2009 as providing "residential care and community services to older people in the local community, including meals on wheels, day care and laundry services." The facility was singled out during the Oireachtas debate for commendation as a successful example of how "community development is able to lay the foundation for local groups to develop into fully fledged community enterprises."

The community of Brickens participates in such organizations as the Irish Countrywomen's Association and the Brickens Foróige Club, part of a national youth organization with branches throughout Ireland. Foróige is a contraction of the Irish phrase forbairt na hóige, meaning "development of youth".

The village also has a local Enterprise Centre operating under the aegis of the Irish state economic development agency, Enterprise Ireland. The facility, called the Gilmore Enterprise Centre, contains resources for local entrepreneurs planning to start small local businesses. It was opened officially by the Cathaoirleach of Mayo County Council in October 2010.

== Education ==
A Montessori pre-school called Little Acorns Children's Centre was opened in Brickens by the minister of state for labour affairs, Dara Calleary, in April 2010. It was erected on land donated by Brickens Integrated Resource Development Company and catered for 53 children when it began.

There was a two-roomed national school in the village in generations past called Ballinvilla School, where the sexes were segregated. The school was beside the church but, today, primary and secondary school children are taken by bus to schools beyond the townland, such as Bekan National School. The old Ballinvilla school building was renovated and extended during the early 1980s for use as a community centre, as part of an AnCO Community Youth Training Project.

== Sport ==
The local GAA football club is the Eastern Gaels, founded in 1984. The team colours are blue and yellow, and there is a playing pitch on the northern outskirts of Brickens, in the direction of Keebagh.

== Notable residents ==
- Michael Cleary, bishop of Banjul in Gambia (retired 2006).

== See also ==
- List of towns and villages in Ireland
