= Michael J. Cleary =

Irish Catholic bishop (1925–2020)

Michael J. Cleary C.S.Sp.
- Bishop of Banjul
- Church: Catholic Church
- Diocese: Diocese of Banjul
- In office: 24 January 1981 – 25 February 2006
- Predecessor: Michael Joseph Moloney
- Successor: Robert Ellison

Orders
- Ordination: 29 June 1952
- Consecration: 25 March 1981 by Johannes Dyba

Personal details
- Born: 1 September 1925 Brickeens, County Mayo, Irish Free State, British Empire
- Died: 3 September 2020 (aged 95) Dublin, Ireland

Michael J. Cleary C.S.Sp. (1 September 1925 – 3 September 2020) was an Irish prelate and Roman Catholic Bishop Emeritus of the Diocese of Banjul, Gambia. He was born in Brickens, County Mayo, Ireland. He was educated at St Jarlath's College in Tuam, before entering the novitiate where he also studied for an arts degree in University College Dublin.

He was ordained a priest on 29 June 1952 for the Holy Ghost Fathers. On 24 January 1981, he was appointed Bishop of the Diocese of Banjul, and ordained on 24 March 1981. The principal consecrator was Archbishop Johannes Dyba; his principal co-consecrators were Archbishop Joseph Ganda, and Bishop Michael Joseph Moloney.

Cleary retired on 25 February 2006, although he spent a further nine years in Gambia. He spent his last years at the Holy Ghost Fathers retirement home at the Kimmage Manor campus in Dublin, where he died aged 95 on 3 September 2020. He was buried in Dardistown Cemetery
