= Gabriel Mendy =

Gambian Roman Catholic prelate

The Most Reverend Gabriel Mendy C.S.Sp.
- Bishop of Banjul
- Church: Roman Catholic Church
- Diocese: Banjul
- See: Banjul
- Appointed: 30 November 2017
- Installed: 4 February 2018
- Predecessor: Robert Patrick Ellison

Orders
- Ordination: 15 November 1997 by Michael Joseph Cleary
- Consecration: 3 February 2018 by Edward Tamba Charles

Personal details
- Born: Gabriel Mendy; 9 April 1967 (age 59) Lamin, Gambia
- Education: Duquesne University

Gabriel Mendy (born 9 April 1967) is a Gambian Roman Catholic prelate and professed member from the Spiritans who is the current Bishop of Banjul in the Gambia since his appointment on 30 November 2017. He is the first Gambian national to be appointed to the diocese and the first Gambian to be made a bishop.

== Life ==
Gabriel Mendy was born on 9 April 1967 in Lamin in the Gambia. He has four brothers and two sisters who all live in Banjul.

He completed his studies in 1985 at the Saint Peter's Technical and Senior School in Lamin before commencing his novitiate with the Spiritans; this lasted until 1987. He continued with his philosophical studies at Nsukka in Nigeria before his ordination and then doing pastoral work in Kenema in Sierra Leone from 1990 until 1991.

It was around this time that he attended the Duquesne college in Pittsburgh where he graduated from the philosophical department in 1998. He continued his formation in the Spiritans after this at the Spiritan International Theological School at Enugu in Nigeria from 1993 until his ordination which was celebrated on 15 November 1997 in Banjul. Mendy made his solemn religious profession as a Spiritan on 31 August 1996 while still a seminarian. From 1997 until 1998 he did pastoral work in the Saint Peter and Saint Therese parishes while also working as an aide at the Saint Martin of Porres parish in Freetown in Sierra Leone.

From 1999 until 2002 he served as a teacher back in Kenema before working as a parish priest in the Santa Maria parish from 2002 to 2004 in Pendembu, which was also in Sierra Leone. Mendy returned to Pittsburgh to the college from 2004 to 2009 where he graduated with a doctorate in 2009. Until his episcopal appointment, he served as both the professor (from 2010) and vice-rector (from 2011) of the Spiritan International Theological School at Enugu.

Throughout 2009 until 2010 he served as a parochial vicar in New York while he did summer work in New York from 2006 until a decade later in 2016. One such task while in New York was to encourage parishioners to attend Eucharistic Adoration held in the parish chapel.

He was still in New York at Staten Island (since September 2017 on a sabbatical at Saint Christopher's parish church) on 30 November 2017 when Pope Francis appointed him as the newest Bishop of Banjul. The announcement proved historic for he became the first Gambian national to lead the see and the first Gambian in general to be appointed as a bishop. Mendy received his episcopal consecration on 3 February 2018 in Bakau at the Independence Stadium from Archbishop Edward Tamba Charles.

In December 2017 he met with the Cardinal Archbishop of New York Timothy Michael Dolan at the latter's residence in Manhattan. The cardinal gifted Mendy with mitre and a cassock as well as a ring and pastoral staff in preparation for Mendy's consecration and enthronement in his new see.
