= Giorgio Biguzzi =

Italian Roman Catholic bishop (1936–2024)

His Excellency Giorgio Biguzzi
- Bishop Emeritus of Makeni
- Metropolis: Freetown
- Diocese: Makeni
- Appointed: 17 November 1986
- Term ended: 7 January 2012
- Predecessor: Augusto Fermo Azzolini
- Successor: Henry Aruna

Orders
- Ordination: 16 October 1960 by Gaetano Pollio
- Consecration: 6 January 1987 by Pope John Paul II

Personal details
- Born: 4 February 1936 Cesena, Italy
- Died: 1 July 2024 (aged 88) Parma, Italy

Giorgio Biguzzi (4 February 1936 – 1 July 2024) was an Italian Roman Catholic prelate. He was bishop of Makeni from 1986 to 2012. Biguzzi died in Parma on 1 July 2024, at the age of 88.

Catholic Church titles
Preceded by Augusto Fermo Azzolini	Bishop of Makeni; 1986–2012	Succeeded by Henry Aruna
