= Ambrose Kelly =

Roman Catholic archbishop

Ambrose Kelly C.S.Sp.
- Archbishop of Freetown and Bo
- Church: Catholic Church
- Archdiocese: Archdiocese of Freetown and Bo
- In office: 18 May 1937 – 12 February 1952
- Predecessor: Bartholomew Stanislaus Wilson
- Successor: Thomas Joseph Brosnahan
- Previous post: Titular Bishop of Altava (1937-1950)

Orders
- Ordination: 17 June 1928
- Consecration: 24 August 1937 by Paschal Robinson

Personal details
- Born: 24 June 1900 Newhaven, Sussex, United Kingdom of Great Britain and Ireland
- Died: 12 February 1952 (aged 51) Colony and Protectorate of Sierra Leone, British Empire

Bishop Ambrose Kelly C.S.Sp (born 24 June 1900, died 12 February 1952) was a member of the Holy Ghost Fathers, and served as Archbishop of Freetown and Bo, in Sierre Leone.

Born in 1900 in Newhaven, Sussex, England, to Irish parents, Kelly was educated in Ireland, at Blackrock College, Dublin and trained to be a Holy Ghost priest, at Kimmage Manor, St. Marys, Rathmines and Blackrock, while studying in University College Dublin, graduating in 1922. At Blackrock he excelled at sports, captaining the Cricket team, and playing out-half in the Senior Cup Rugby Team. He also gained an inter-provincial cap. He played fly half, for Blackrocks, past-pupils rugby team, while prefect there. Two of his contemporaries also became bishops, John Joseph McCarthy, and Eugene Joseph Butler. Two of Kelly's brothers, Jim and Patrick, were also educated at Blackrock, and both became priests.

Kelly was ordained a priest in 1928. He worked as a teacher in St. Edward's Secondary School, Freetown, Sierre Leone.

In 1937 he was appointed Vicar Apostolic to Sierre Leone, and Titular Bishop of Altava and ordained bishop in Blackrock College. In 1950 Dr. Kelly was appointed to the Bishopric of Freetown and Bo when the Vicarate was elevated to a Diocese, its first Bishop.

Bishop Kelly opened the Catholic Teachers Training College in Bo, and the General and Maternity Clinic in Serabu.

After developing health problems in 1951, Bishop Kelly died on 12 February 1952 in Sierre Leone. Initially buried in the Kissy Road cemetery, his remains were later exhumed in 1987 and re-buried in the Sacred Heart Cathedral.
