= Bartholomew Stanislaus Wilson =

Irish Roman Catholic bishop

The Right Reverend Bartholomew Stanislaus Wilson C.S.Sp., MC
- Vicar Apostolic of Sierra Leone
- Church: Roman Catholic Church
- Diocese: Sierra Leone
- See: Acmonia (Titular)
- Appointed: 16 April 1936 (Sierra Leone)
- Term ended: 1936 (Resigned)
- Predecessor: John Joseph O'Gorman
- Successor: Ambrose Kelly
- Other post: Vicar Apostolic of Bagamoyo (1924–1933)
- Previous post: Military Chaplain

Orders
- Ordination: 28 October 1913

Personal details
- Born: Bartholomew Stanislaus Wilson; 27 May 1884 Queenstown, Co. Cork
- Died: October 28, 1938 (aged 54)
- Denomination: Roman Catholic
- Occupation: Spiritan Missionary

Bartholomew Stanislaus Wilson C.S.Sp. (1884–1938), sometimes referred to as Bartholomew Stanley Wilson, was an Irish-born Roman Catholic priest, bishop, and member of the Spiritan order. He served as Vicar Apostolic of Bagamoyo in East Africa, and also of Sierra Leone, British West Africa.

== Life ==
Wilson was born on 27 May 1884 in Queenstown, Cobh, Co. Cork, Ireland. He entered the Spiritan order and was ordained to the priesthood on 28 October 1913. He had three brothers who were priests, and a sister, who was a Sister of Mercy.

He volunteered as a Military Chaplain in World War I, with the 15th Regiment, serving from 1915 to 1917, and was awarded the Military Cross. After two years as an army chaplain, he returned to Ireland, serving as Dean of Discipline, in Rockwell College and subsequently Director of Scholastics in Blackrock College.

On 4 January 1924 Pope Pius XI appointed him to Titular Bishop of Acmonia and Vicar Apostolic of Bagamoyo, in present-day Tanzania.

In 1933, Bishop Wilson was appointed Vicar Apostolic of Sierra Leone, succeeding fellow Irish Spiritan, John Joseph O'Gorman CSSp on 16 April 1936. Pius XI accepted Bishop Wilson's resignation request, and he was succeeded by another Irish Spiritan Ambrose Kelly C.S.Sp.

He died on 28 October 1938.
