= Bekan, County Mayo =

Village in County Mayo, Ireland

Bekan Béacán
- Village
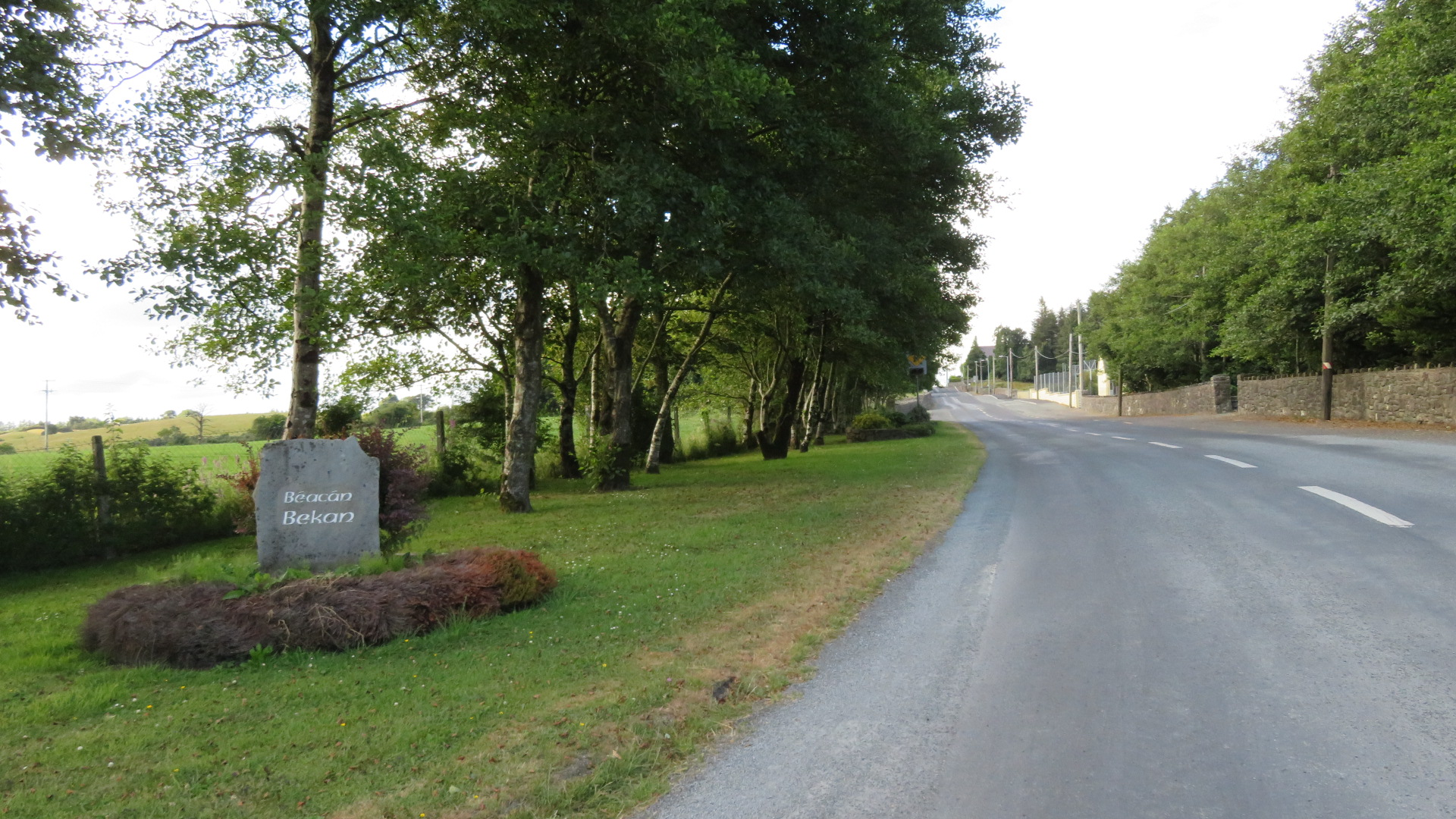
- Southern entrance to Bekan village

- Location in Ireland
- Coordinates: 53°45′42″N 8°51′04″W
- Country: Ireland
- Province: Connacht
- County: County Mayo

Government
  - Electoral division: Bekan
  - Dáil constituency: Mayo constituency
  - EU Parliament: Midlands–North-West
- Elevation: 84 m (276 ft)
- Time zone: UTC+0 (WET)
  - Summer (DST): UTC-1 (IST (WEST))
- Irish Grid Reference: M4393279426

Bekan (Irish: Béacán) is a village in County Mayo, Ireland. Because of the almost entirely rural population, it is traditionally a farming community. The village is between Ballyhaunis and Knock on the L1501 local road which connects the N60 and R323 roads.

== Education ==
St. Joseph's National School, or Bekan National School, is a co-educational primary school which had 164 pupils in 2025.

== Transport ==
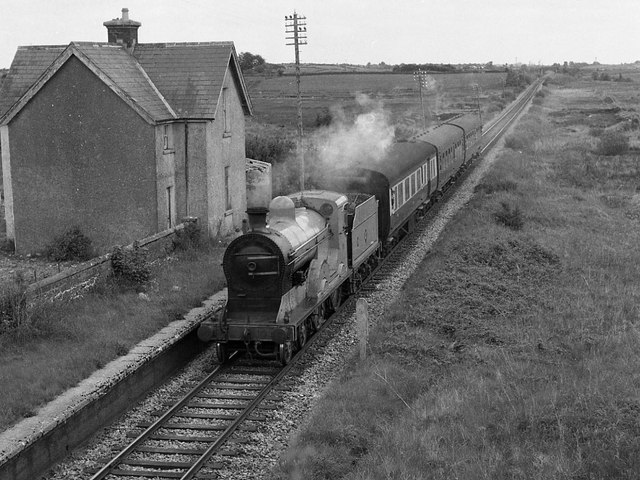
Steam locomotive passing west towards Claremorris past (the closed) Bekan railway station in 1975.

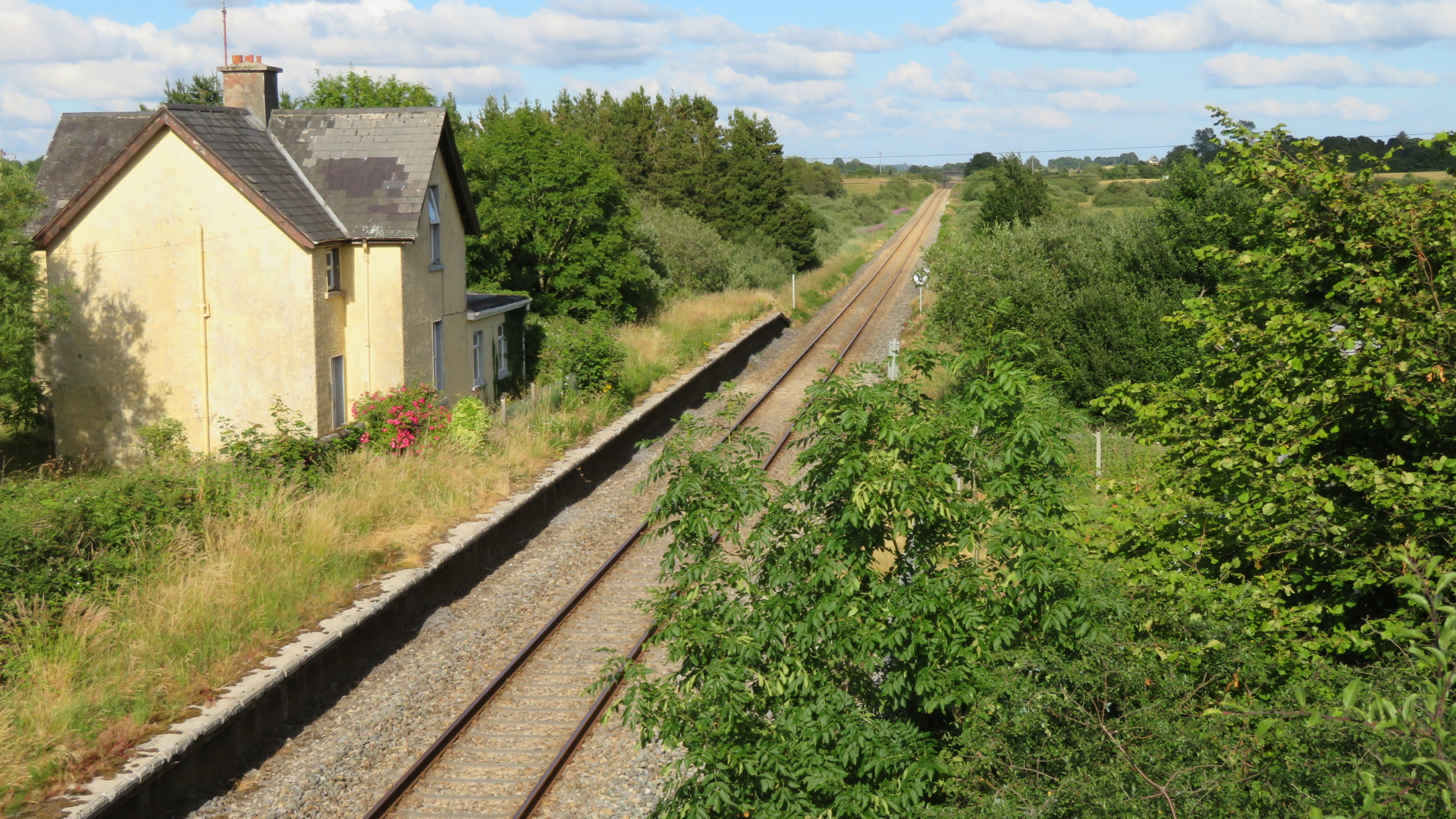
The former Bekan railway station in 2018; view facing east towards Ballyhaunis.

Bekan railway station opened on 1 January 1909 and closed on 17 June 1963.

== Religion ==
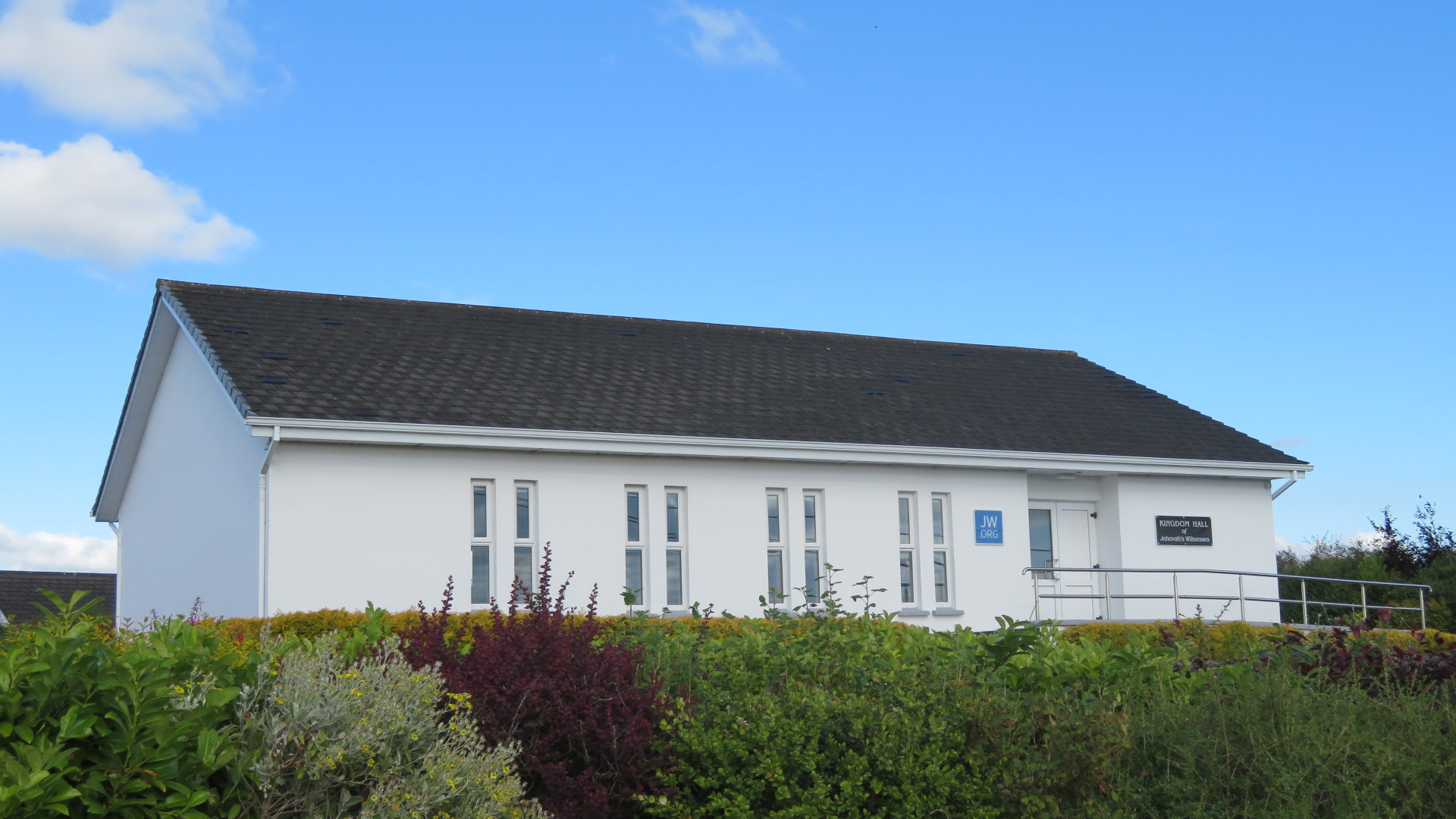
Kingdom Hall in Bekan

There is a 173-square-metre Jehovah's Witnesses Kingdom Hall with a seating capacity of 120 on the south side of Bekan, built by 200 volunteers during a weekend in 2004.

St. Margaret Mary's Church is a local Catholic church in the centre of the village.

== Sport ==
Eastern Gaels is the local Gaelic Football club, which represents both Bekan and Brickens. The Connacht Gaelic Athletic Association Centre of Excellence, built just outside the village in December 2012, is the main sporting facility in the area. The centre has a 3G pitch, five floodlit Gaelic games pitches, and a gymnasium.

== Notable people ==
Joseph Finnegan (1898–1962) of the Massachusetts state senate was born in Bekan. He emigrated to Boston in 1916, where he became a lawyer and state representative for Dorchester, Boston before being elected to the upper chamber. Senator Joseph Finnegan Park in Dorchester is named in his honour. He became the father-in-law of future Apollo 11 astronaut Michael Collins when his eldest child, Patricia, married Collins in 1957.

== See also ==
- List of towns and villages in Ireland
