= Eastern Gaels GAA =

Gaelic games club in County Mayo, Ireland

Eastern Gaels
- Gael an Oirthir
- Founded: 1984
- County: Mayo
- Colours: Royal, Yellow
- Grounds: Eastern Gaels GAA Grounds, Brickens
- Coordinates: 53°43′26.0″N 8°52′33.9″W

Playing kits
Standard colours

Senior Club Championships
	All Ireland	Connacht champions	Mayo champions
Football:	-	-	0

Eastern Gaels GAA (Irish: CLG Gaeil an Oirthir) is a Gaelic Athletic Association club located in Brickens, County Mayo, Ireland. The club was founded in 1984 in the parish of Bekan drawing its members from Bekan, Brickens to its south, and Logboy to its southeast.

The club is a member of the East Division of Mayo GAA and currently competes in the Mayo Junior A Championship. At underage level, the Eastern Gaels won a Mayo Minor B title in 1993.

The club colours are royal blue with a gold band.

== External sources ==
- Club Website
