= Thomas Joseph Brosnahan =

Thomas Joseph Brosnahan C.S.Sp.
- Archbishop of the Diocese of Freetown and Bo
- Church: Sacred Heart Cathedral, Freetown
- Diocese: Roman Catholic Diocese of Freetown and Bo
- See: Roman Catholic Diocese of Freetown and Bo
- Elected: 4 June 1984
- In office: 2 December 1984
- Retired: 26 April 2002
- Predecessor: Ambrose Kelly
- Successor: Joseph Henry Ganda
- Other post: President of Inter-territorial Catholic Bishops' Conference of The Gambia and Sierra Leone

Orders
- Ordination: 16 June 1929
- Consecration: 7 March 1953

Personal details
- Born: Thomas Joseph Brosnahan; 30 March 1905 Whitegate, County Clare, Ireland
- Died: 26 January 1996 (aged 90)
- Denomination: Roman Catholic Church
- Profession: Catholic priest
- Education: Rockwell College
- Alma mater: Blackrock College; Kimmage Manor

Styles of Thomas Joseph Brosnahan
- Reference style: His Excellency; The Most Reverend
- Spoken style: Your Excellency
- Religious style: Bishop

The Most Reverend Thomas Joseph Brosnahan, Archbishop Emeritus, C.S.Sp. (30 March 1905 – 26 January 1996) was Archbishop of Freetown and Bo in Sierra Leone.

== Early life ==
Born in Whitegate, Ireland, on 30 March 1905. He was educated in Rockwell College, County Tipperary. He played hurling for the school senior team. He entered Holy Ghost Missionary College, Kimmage Manor, Dublin to study for the Holy Ghost Fathers, and studied in Blackrock College.

== Ministry ==
He entered the Holy Ghost Fathers and his ordination took place on 16 June 1929. His ministry in east Nigeria began in 1933, where he remained for 20 years.

=== Bishop of Freetown and Bo ===
He arrived in Freetown in 1953 to succeed Archbishop Ambrose Kelly, who had died the previous year. He was appointed Bishop of Freetown and Bo and began his ministry in Sierra Leone. The main focus of his work was education and he made tremendous progress in this area. He founded Christ the King College in Bo in the year of his arrival. On 9 April 1961, he performed the first ordination of a diocesan priest, Joseph Ganda, at the Immaculate Heart Church in Bo. He was a council father in Sessions 1 to 4 of the Second Vatican Council.

=== First archbishop of Freetown and Bo ===
Brosnahan became the first Archbishop of Freetown and Bo, in 1971. From 1971 to 1975, he was president of the Inter-territorial Catholic Bishops' Conference of The Gambia and Sierra Leone. In 1975, he erected the Archdiocesan Secretariat Santanno House on Howe Street. He retired in 1980 and was succeeded by Joseph Ganda.

== Legacy ==
He founded Christ the King College in 1953. Today it is a technical college that is a subsidiary of the University of Sierra Leone and has many prominent figures among its alumni, including politician Charles Margai and former vice president of Sierra Leone Solomon Berewa. A number of international students from Liberia, Gambia, Ghana and Nigeria attend the college.

Catholic Church titles
Preceded by Ambrose Kelly	Archbishop of Freetown and Bo; 1952–1980	Succeeded by Joseph Henry Ganda
