= St Joseph's Boys' School =

Coordinates: 55.001°N 7.338°W

Location
- Westway, Creggan Estate; Derry, County Londonderry, BT48 9NX; Northern Ireland

Information
- Religious affiliation: Roman Catholic
- Local authority: Western Education and Library Board
- Principal: Mrs Ciara Deane
- Staff: 90 (approx)
- Age: 11 to 18
- Colour
- Website: www.stjosephsderry.org.uk

St Joseph's Boys' School is a secondary school in Westway in the Creggan area of Derry, Northern Ireland. It is a voluntary maintained school, supported by the Western Education and Library Board and operated by boards of trustees and governors in collaboration with Northern Ireland's Council for Catholic Maintained Schools and the Roman Catholic Diocese of Derry.

Since the school opened in September 1963, St Joseph's Secondary School (as it was known as then) has gone through tremendous changes. The old school was demolished and a new ultra modern school was opened and they changed the name to St. Joseph's Boys' School in March 2003. The principal of the school was Mr P. Hannaway with the Vice Principals being Mr . K. McCallion and Mr. P. Kealey. Hannaway resigned and Mr P. Kealey temporarily stood in until Damian Harkin was appointed as Principal. As of 2022, the principal is Mrs Ciara Deane, the third female to serve as the school Principal after the resignation of Martina McCarron who served as Principal from 2018-2022. St. Joseph's Boys' School offers a variety of subjects ranging from English, Maths, Geography and Leisure and Tourism to Technology and Design, Art and Physical Education (P.E).

St Joseph's is also equipped with a number of modern computer suites, a modern gym and two specialist units. The Suspension Unit serves students who have been internally suspended, and Education plus, a unit which was set up in 2003, serves students with statements of special educational needs.

In 2006, English football goalkeeper, Gordon Banks paid a visit to the school. He delivered a speech and launched Don Mullan's new book, A Hero Who Could Fly. In January 2007, the school set up a healthy eating programme which banned fizzy drinks and only water would be allowed. Water bottles marked with the initials "STJ" were provided, however the school has since banned water bottles.

== Notable former pupils ==
- Don Mullan (born 1956), humanitarian and author of Eyewitness Bloody Sunday and Gordon Banks: A Hero Who Could Fly
- Michael Bradley (born 1959), radio producer and bassist with the punk rock band The Undertones
- Richard Moore, founder of Charity Organisation Children in Crossfire
- Shane Duffy, Footballer for Brighton and Hove Albion
- Saxby Chambliss, (born 1943), United States Republican Senator for Georgia (2003-2015) and Chair of the Senate Agriculture Committee
- Bert Van Manen, (born 1965), Australian Politician for the Liberal National Party of Queensland and federal MP for Forde
