= John Joseph O'Gorman =

Irish bishop

John Joseph O'Gorman C.S.Sp.
- Vicar Apostolic of Sierra Leone
- Church: Catholic Church
- See: Vicariate Apostolic of Sierra Leone
- In office: 14 September 1903 – 23 September 1932
- Predecessor: Melchior de Marion Brésillac
- Successor: Bartholomew Stanislaus Wilson
- Other post: Titular Bishop of Amastris (1903-1935)

Orders
- Ordination: 8 October 1889 by François-Marie Duboin
- Consecration: 28 October 1903 by Patrick John Ryan

Personal details
- Born: 8 May 1866 Hacketstown, County Carlow, United Kingdom of Great Britain and Ireland
- Died: 13 April 1935 (aged 68) Fribourg, Canton of Fribourg, Switzerland

John Joseph O'Gorman C.S.Sp. (8 May 1866 – 13 April 1935) was an Irish member of the Congregation of the Holy Spirit, who served as Bishop of Freetown in Sierra Leone, its first Roman Catholic bishop. He was the first Irish member of the order to be appointed Bishop.

Born in 1866 in Hacketstown, County Carlow, he attended Blackrock College in Dublin for his secondary schooling. He moved to France for further studies and to train for the Holy Ghost Fathers, and was ordained in 1889. He served in the United States. In 1903 he was appointed Vicar General to Sierra Leone, and Titular Bishop.

He died in 1935, and is buried in Switzerland where he had retired, due to ill health. Bishop O'Gorman was succeeded by fellow Irish Holy Ghost Father the Corkman, Bartholomew Stanley Wilson as Bishop.
