= Kimmage Mission Institute =

Theological institute in Ireland

Kimmage Mission Institute - Institute of Theology and Cultures
- Type: Private
- Active: 1991–2006
- Religious affiliation: Holy Ghost Fathers (Spiritans)
- Academic affiliations: HETAC (1991–2006)
- President: Rev Dr Cornelius J Casey CSsR (1996-1999) Rev Michael McCabe SMA (1999-2000) Rev Dr Thomas R. Whelan CSSp (2001-2003)
- Location: Kimmage Manor (1991–2003); Miltown Institute(2003–2006); Dublin, Ireland
- Campus: Urban

Kimmage Mission Institute (KMI) was an educational institute of theology and cultures, founded 1991, by the Holy Ghost Fathers, at their Missionary College, in Kimmage Manor, Dublin. The Holy Ghost Fathers had a long history of teaching Theology and Philosophy in Kimmage to its missionaries. The KMI was developed as a response in the fall in vocations. As well as the Spiritans, ten other missionary congregations were involved in the institute (they were the Divine Word Missionaries (SVD), Franciscan Missionary Sisters for Africa (FMA), Missionary Sisters of the Holy Rosary (MSHR), Medical Missionaries of Mary (MMM), Missionary Sisters of St. Columban, Missionary Society of Saint Columban (SSC), Missionary Sisters of Our Lady of the Apostles (OLA), Redemptorist Congregation (CSsR), Society of African Missions (SMA) and Saint Patrick's Society for the Foreign Missions (SPS)). The KMI worked closely with its other Spiritan College on the Holy Ghost Missionary College campus, the Kimmage Development Studies Centre (DSC).

The KMI provided diplomas, a degree and postgraduate studies in Theology, Mission and Cultural studies. The KMI's degrees and diplomas were validated by HETAC and its predecessor the National Council for Education Award (NCEA).

The KMI Bachelor of Arts in Theology and Anthropology degree commenced in 1991 validated by NCEA. was recognised for teaching religion in post-primary schools.

In 1998 a Diploma in Mission Studies was delivered for the first time and in 1999 an MA was validated by the NCEA for delivery by the KMI.

In 2003 the institute moved from Kimmage Manor to the Jesuit Milltown Institute of Theology and Philosophy formally merging into the Dept. of Theology and Cultures in 2006.

== Presidents of the Kimmage Mission Institute ==
- Rev. Dr. Vincent McNamara, BA, DCL, DPhil, SPS
- Rev. Dr. Cornelius J Casey BA, STL, DPhil, CSsR (1996 -1999), later President of the Milltown Institute (2008-2010)
- Rev. Dr. Michael McCabe, BA, DD, SMA (1999-2000) - Served as Superior of the Irish Province Society of African Missions
- Rev. Dr. Thomas R. Whelan BMus, BD, SLL, DipMusEd, DipLatLit, CSSp, (2001-2003), later President of the Milltown Institute (2010-2015)

== See also ==
- Kimmage Development Studies Centre
- Milltown Institute of Theology and Philosophy
