= Yamandu =

- Location in Sierra Leone
- Coordinates: 8°30′N 10°52′W
- Country: Sierra Leone
- Province: Eastern Province
- District: Kono District
- Time zone: UTC-5 (GMT)

Yamandu is a town in the Kono District in the Eastern Province of Sierra Leone. The population is predominantly from the Kono ethnic group. Population figures from past censuses are:
1963: 2,910
1985: 4,101
2004: under 3000.

There was an extensive diamond mining and trading operation in Yamandu in the 1950s and 1960s, which was carried on by Lebanese traders.
