= Michael Joseph Moloney =

Irish-born priest

His Excellency Michael Joseph Moloney CSSp CBE
- Bishop Emeritus of Banjul
- Church: Catholic Church
- Diocese: Diocese of Banjul
- Appointed: 24 December 1957
- Installed: 4 May 1958
- Retired: 14 November 1980
- Other post: Prefect Apostolic of Bathurst in Gambia (1951–1957)

Orders
- Ordination: 20 June 1937
- Consecration: 4 May 1958 by Albert Levame
- Rank: Bishop

Personal details
- Born: Michael Joseph Moloney; 12 May 1912 Killaloe, Ireland
- Died: 31 December 1991 Kimmage Manor, Dublin, Ireland
- Denomination: Catholic
- Education: Holy Ghost Missionary College, Kimmage Manor

Bishop Michael Joseph Moloney C.S.Sp. (12 May 1912 – 31 December 1991) was an Irish-born priest of the Holy Ghost Fathers, also known as Spiritans. He served as Bishop of Bathurst in Gambia for 42 of his 54 years as a priest and bishop. He was created Commander of the Order of the British Empire (CBE) about 1951.

== Early years and education ==
Born in Bodyke, on 12 May 1912, to a farming family with three brothers and three sisters. He went to the Holy Ghost Fathers' Blackrock College where his uncle was a teacher. His captained the senior rugby team to Leinster Schools Cup wins in 1928 and 1929. After Blackrock he went to the Holy Ghost Missionary College at Kimmage Manor, studying philosophy and theology.

== Career ==
He was ordained a priest in 1937, and went to Gambia in Africa in 1938. At that time, the country was "a missionary backwater". The population in the country was primarily Muslim. Moloney served the Anglican Diocese of Gambia and the Rio Pongas, first at Basse Santa Su, under Father Meehan, who had arrived in Gambia in 1905. Moloney traveled by bike or on foot to area villages and established small catechetical schools. In Basse, he established a mission school, with a garden for horticultural experiments and fruit trees, in the center of town. A few of the 31 students were Christians. By 1942, he established a chapel and operated a school in the village of Mansajang. He created readings from the New Testament, a short Bible history, and a catechism in the Fula language and sought to convert people who were not Muslim. He had difficulty, for various reasons, in converting people to Catholicism. He had also established a school in Fullabantang by 1943. In 1948, he had a mission house built in Mansajang, with the assistance of Father Corrigan. At the end of 1951, he was made a Prefect Apostolic. He was also made Commander of the Order of the British Empire (CBE), on the British honours list. Now Monsignor Moloney, he moved into the church's residence in Bathurst.

In 1957, the Pope created the Diocese of Bathurst in The Gambia and Moloney appointed its first bishop on 24 December 1957. He was consecrated bishop in Kimmage Manor on Sunday 4 May 1958 by the Apostolic Nuncio to Ireland, the Most Revd Albert Levame, with Archbishop of Dublin John Charles McQuaid and President of Ireland Éamon de Valera present. Also in attendance were his mother, six siblings, and a number of people who had traveled from Gambia for the event.

Bathurst was renamed Banjul, and on 9 May 1974, he became Bishop of Banjul. From 1975 to 1977, he was president of Inter-territorial Catholic Bishops’ Conference of the Gambia and Sierra Leone.

He retired on 14 November 1980 due to ill health and in 1981 retired to the Holy Ghost Fathers home, Kimmage Manor. Moloney died on 31 December 1991, aged 79.
