= Joseph Ganda (bishop) =

Sierra Leonean Catholic priest (1932–2023)

The Most Reverend Joseph Ganda
- Archbishop Emeritus of Freetown and Bo
- Metropolis: Freetown
- Appointed: 4 September 1980
- Installed: 23 November 1980
- Term ended: 2 March 2007
- Predecessor: Thomas Joseph Brosnahan
- Successor: Edward Tamba Charles
- Other post: President of Inter-territorial Catholic Bishops' Conference of The Gambia and Sierra Leone
- Previous post: Bishop of Kenema (1970–1980)

Orders
- Ordination: 9 April 1961
- Consecration: 11 November 1970 by Francis Carroll

Personal details
- Born: Joseph Henry Ganda; 22 March 1932 Serabu, Bo District, British Sierra Leone
- Died: 9 August 2023 (aged 91)
- Education: Bigard Memorial Seminary; Catholic Training College

Styles of Joseph Henry Ganda
- Reference style: His Excellency; The Most Reverend
- Spoken style: Your Grace
- Religious style: Archbishop

The Most Reverend Joseph Henry Ganda (22 March 1932 – 9 August 2023) was a Sierra Leonean Roman Catholic archbishop of the Archdiocese of Freetown and Bo.

Born in the village Serabu in the Bo district on 22 March 1932, Ganda was the first in the area to study for the priesthood. He completed seminary training at Bigard Memorial Seminary in Enugu, Nigeria in 1955 returning home a Deacon.

On 9 April 1961, he was ordained the first priest of Sierra Leone (just two weeks before its political independence). He was made the first Catholic bishop of the Diocese of Kenema in the Eastern Province of Sierra Leone in 1971.

On 23 November 1980, he was installed as the first native-born archbishop of the Archdiocese of Freetown in Sierra Leone. While archbishop, Ganda oversaw the construction of the St. Paul Cathedral in Kenema, the St. Paul's Seminary in Regent, Freetown, and he is credited with encouraging young people to join the service of the Church, either as priests or nuns.

Ganda retired 2 March 2007, after almost thirty-six years of Catholic ministry. He was replaced as archbishop by Edward Tamba Charles.

== Early life and education ==
Joseph Henry Ganda was born to Catholic parents in the village of Serabu in the district of Bo. As a newborn, he got the measles and, afraid he would succumb, his mother had him baptized by a catechist. He recovered and his parents baptized him a second time at the Sacred Heart Church in Serabu. As a child, he was sickly and was treated at the hospital.

Ganda received his primary education at the Sacred Heart Primary School. He was an altar boy at his local church. Even as a small child, he dreamed of being a priest. He attended St. Edwards Secondary School in Freetown.

Ganda applied to Bigard Memorial Seminary in Enugu, Nigeria in 1955. The Bishop approved his application however he requested that Ganda do a year-long probation at the Catholic Training College in Bo under the supervision of Fr. Andrew O’Toole. Ganda distinguished himself during his probation, teaching French to the first students at Christ the King College.

Ganda entered Bigard Memorial Seminary in 1955. He remained there for 7 uninterrupted years of training and returned to Sierra Leone as a Deacon.

== An Historic Ordination ==
Ganda's ordination took place on 9 April 1961 at the Immaculate Heart Church in Bo. As Ganda was Sierra Leone's first diocesan priest, it was a historic event.

His ordination was attended by Sir Milton Margai, Prime Minister of Sierra Leone, all members of parliament, over 100 paramount chiefs and imams, 30 missionary priests and over 3000 people. The event widely reported in the national newspapers.

Just two weeks after his ordination, Sierra Leone achieved independence from colonial rule.

Ganda celebrated his first mass in his hometown in Serabu at the Sacred Heart Church. A month after his ordination, he returned to Biggard Memorial Seminary and completed his studies.

== Death ==
Joseph Ganda died from prostate cancer on 9 August 2023, at the age of 91.

Catholic Church titles
Preceded by Thomas Joseph Brosnahan	Archbishop Emeritus of Freetown and Bo; 1980–2007	Succeeded by Edward Tamba Charles
Preceded by First bishop	Bishop of Kenema; 1970–1980	Succeeded by John Christopher O’Riordan
