= Catholic Church in the Gambia =

The Catholic Church in the Gambia is part of the worldwide Catholic Church, under the spiritual leadership of the Pope in Rome. The Diocese of Banjul covers the whole of the country.

Catholics constituted approximately 2.9% of the population in 2020.

== History ==
The history of the Catholic Church in the Gambia is closely linked to Senegal. In 1445 Portuguese arrived on the coast of West Africa and made the first attempts at evangelisation. Further attempts were made by French missionaries in 1849. Between 1849 and 1949, Catholicism was largely limited to Banjul.

From the ecclesiastical point of view, the mission of the Gambia started in 1931, entrusted to the Congregation of the Holy Spirit, detached from the Apostolic vicariate of Senegambia. The Apostolic Prefecture of Bathurst (now Banjul) was erected in 1951, and became a diocese in 1957 immediately subject to the Holy See.

In 1992 Pope John Paul II visited Gambia and stressed the importance of the good relations existing between the Catholic and Muslim communities, saying "we are all pilgrims on the path of seeking to do God’s will in everything. Although we differ in many ways, there are important elements of our respective faiths which can serve as a basis for fruitful dialogue and a strengthening of the spirit of tolerance and mutual help". He met with leaders of the Muslim community, and Muslims were present at the Mass he celebrated at the Independence Stadium while in the Gambia.

== Organization and institutions ==
In 2008 the Catholic Church was present in the territory with the sole Diocese of Banjul, immediately subject to the Holy See.

By 2019, the Catholic Church of The Gambia counted:

- 22 parishes
- 38 priests
- ≈55 religious sisters
- 57 schools
- 9 charities

The episcopate of the Gambia is part of the Catholic Church in Inter-territorial Catholic Bishops' Conference of The Gambia and Sierra Leone.

== Interfaith relations ==
Gambia is a predominantly Muslim country (approximately 94% of the population as of 2020). Relations between the Muslim and Christian communities in Gambia are generally very good. The Catholic Church operates various missions including schools which children of Muslim parents attend.

== See also ==
- Apostolic Nunciature to Gambia
- Religion in Gambia
- Christianity in Gambia
- Islam in Gambia

== Bibliography ==
- Guide of the Catholic missions in 2005, by the Congregation for the evangelizatione gentium, Rome, Urban University Press, 2005.
