= Diocese of Kenema =

Latin Catholic diocese in Sierra Leone

Coordinates: 7.8769°N 11.1868°W

Diocese of Kenema Dioecesis Kenemaensis

Location
- Country: Sierra Leone
- Metropolitan: Freetown and Bo

Statistics
- Area: 15,710 km^{2} (6,070 sq mi)
- Population: Total; Catholics: (as of 2004); 1,248,080; 21,375 (1.7%)

Information
- Rite: Latin Rite

Current leadership
- Pope: Leo XIV
- Bishop: Henry Aruna

Map
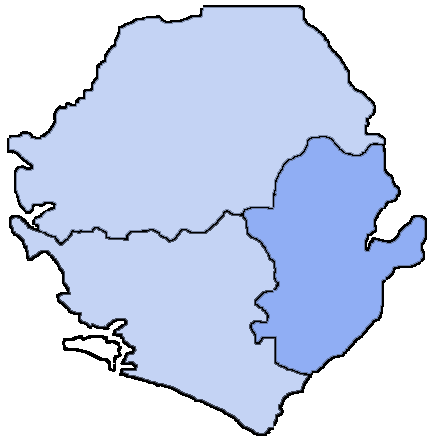

The Diocese of Kenema (Latin: Kenemaën(sis)) is a Latin Catholic diocese of the Catholic Church in the ecclesiastical province of Freetown in Sierra Leone. The region that the Diocese comprises are the border from Bo District to the west, the Republic of Liberia in the southeast, Tonkolili District and Kono District in the north, Guinea in the east.

It was established on 11 November 1970, with its territory being split off from the diocese of Freetown and Bo. The cathedral parish for the diocese is the St. Paul's Cathedral in Kenema.

== Bishops ==
=== Ordinaries ===
- Bishops of Kenema (Roman rite)
  - Bishop Joseph Henry Ganda (1970-11-11 – 1980-09-04), appointed Archbishop of Freetown and Bo
  - Bishop John C. O'Riordan, C.S.Sp., COR (1984-06-04 – 2002-04-26)
  - Bishop Patrick Daniel Koroma (2002-04-26 - 2018-12-14)
  - Bishop Henry Aruna (since 26 January 2019)

=== Auxiliary Bishop ===
- Henry Aruna (2015-2019), appointed Bishop here

=== Other priest of this diocese who became bishop ===
- Edward Tamba Charles, appointed Archbishop of Freetown and Bo in 2008

== See also ==
- Catholic Church in Sierra Leone
- Archdiocese of Freetown

== Sources ==
- GCatholic.org
- Catholic Hierarchy
