= Kimmage Development Studies Centre =

Former private third-level educational institution in Dublin, Ireland

Coordinates: 53.308570°N 6.309929°W

- Type: Private
- Active: 1974–2018
- Religious affiliation: Spiritans
- Academic affiliations: NUIM (2013–2018); HETAC (1989–2015)
- Location: Kimmage Manor; Whitehall Rd, Dublin 12, Dublin, Ireland
- Nickname: Kimmage DSC
- Website: http://www.kimmagedsc.ie

Kimmage Development Studies Centre (DSC) was a private third-level institution based at Holy Ghost Missionary College, Kimmage Manor, Dublin, Ireland from 1974 to July 2018. It provided courses in Development Studies since 1974, as well as other training courses aimed at the international development sector, development practitioners and activists.

== History ==
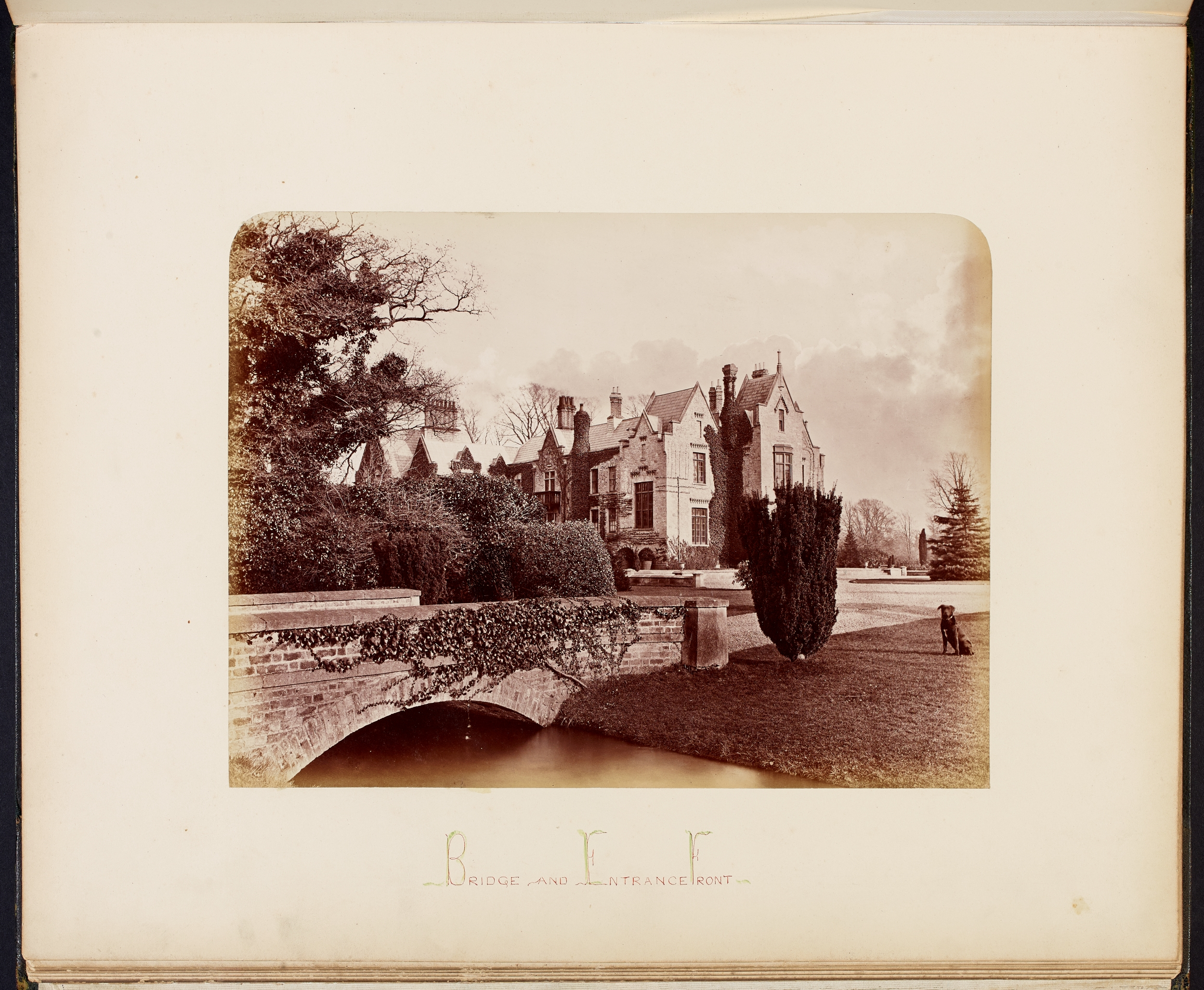
Kimmage House entrance front circa 1870

=== Before the Centre ===
The Holy Ghost Fathers came to Kimmage in 1911 when they purchased the house and its 69 acres, opening it as a Novitate and House of Studies; students would also take degrees from University College Dublin, to which, traditionally, they would cycle. There was significant development of the buildings in 1914, 1929 and in 1938, with the building of the church and facilities for Philosophy and Theology students. From 1924 until 1933 the Holy Ghost Fathers studied theology at Blackrock Castle, before returning to Kimmage.

In 1917 the House of Philosophy moved to St Mary's College, Dublin (while it was closed as a secondary school) then in 1926 it moved to Blackrock, before moving back to Kimmage in 1938 following the developments. In 1974 this was to become Kimmage Development Studies Centre, initially to provide education and training to intending overseas missionaries, and from 1978 onwards to cater for the training needs of the growing development NGOs and volunteer sending agencies.

=== The Centre ===
Kimmage Development Studies Centre was based at Kimmage Manor, Dublin, from 1974 to 2018. It was established by the Irish Province of the Congregation of the Holy Spirit (also known as the Spiritans or the Holy Ghost Fathers), out of their adult education department, under Rev. Richard (Dick) F. Quinn C.S.Sp. (who served as director of the centre from 1976 until 1997). It initially functioned to provide education and training to intending overseas missionaries, who, in addition to priestly formation, often took degrees at UCD. In the mid-1970s the development studies programme grew out of the fourth-year pastoral theology course at Kimmage, which seminarians took. Liberation Theology and experiences of returning missionaries would have inspired many of the seminarians, and lay students in the centre.

From 1978 onwards, to cater for the training needs of the growing development NGOs and volunteer sending agencies, the programme of studies was opened to participants of all backgrounds, cultures, nationalities and religious persuasions. To date, it has accommodated students from over 65 different countries, drawn mainly from Africa and Ireland but increasingly, also from Asia, the Caribbean and Latin America.

As Holy Ghost College, this was one of the independent designated institutions under the aegis of the National Council For Educational Awards (NCEA), per an Act of 1979 and a statutory instrument of 1980, allowing the Development Studies Department to provide Irish Government-recognised certificates and diplomas.

=== The Mission Institute spin-off ===
In 1991, the Kimmage Mission Institute of Theology and Cultures was set up by the Spiritians and a number of other missionary organisations; this moved to the Milltown Institute of Theology and Philosophy in 2003.

=== Cooperative operations ===
In 1994, with Mellemfolkeligt Samvirke (the Danish Action Aid charity), Kimmage began running a Certificate in Community Development course in Arusha, Tanzania. Similarly, in 2001 MS-TCDC with Kimmage offered a Diploma in Development Studies, which in 2004 became the Level 7 BA Degree in Development Studies.

In 2002, Kimmage DSC worked with Training for Transformation (TfT) in providing their Diploma Course for The Grail in Klienmond, Western Cape, South Africa. In 2004, Kimmage DSC successfully tendered for an Irish Aid-funded contract to run a training and learning programme for the Irish development NGO and missionary sector. This programme (known as DTALK) was run by a consortium headed by Kimmage DSC which included the Dutch agency MDF, and the UK agency INTRAC. The programme continued to run until the contract ended in March 2012.

=== Open and distance education ===
Kimmage Open & Distance Education (KODE) was set up following the successful piloting of distance learning courses, primarily in East Africa, in 2007-2008. This was a tutor-supported online professional training programme with courses ranging from 5 to 10 weeks in duration. These courses were structured for learners to work through materials at their own pace and in their own time in subject areas including results-based project cycle management, monitoring and evaluation, governance and accountability, child safeguarding in development contexts, sustainable livelihoods, HIV and gender, and gender-based violence.

=== Fortieth anniversary ===
In 2014, Kimmage DSC celebrated its 40th anniversary. To mark the occasion it produced and published Alumni Stories, 40 Years of Kimmage DSC.

=== Transfer to Maynooth University ===
In July 2018, the academic and professional training programmes of Kimmage DSC were transferred to a newly established Department of International Development at Maynooth University, Ireland's first third level department of this kind.

=== Conclusion ===
The company formerly known as Kimmage DSC changed its name to the Shanahan Research Group (SRG), which continued to operate from Kimmage Manor, supporting doctoral research in international development. SRG completed a voluntary winding down process in early 2022, following successful completion of the doctoral studies of several fellows.

== Programmes ==
=== Academic programmes ===
Academic programmes offered by Kimmage DSC and now available from the Department of International Development at Maynooth University reflect a combination of formal and non-formal educational methodologies and are run at undergraduate (BA) and post graduate (MA and postgraduate diploma) levels, with options to study on a full-time or part-time basis. Modules from the MA in International Development were also made available to students online through a "flexible and distance learning" (FDL) mode of delivery. From September 2016, this MA programme was accredited by Maynooth University. Prior to this date, its MA programme (previously named MA in Development Studies) was internationally accredited by Quality and Qualifications Ireland. Kimmage DSC also provided a BA in International Development in collaboration with Maynooth University, as part of their undergraduate programme from 2013 to 2018. This programme is also now delivered by the Department of International Development at Maynooth University.

=== Capacity development services ===
In addition to its academic programmes, Kimmage DSC provided capacity development services devoted to the professional upgrading of Irish and overseas-based international development personnel. These capacity development services were provided as mentoring and organisational support and the provision of short-term practical training either through classroom-based training or open and distance education (KODE). These services have been rebranded as the Research Engagement and Capacity Hub (REACH) in the new department.

=== Alliances ===
In addition to its collaborations with Maynooth University, Kimmage DSC developed activities and linkages with other like-minded organisations in the development sector in Ireland and internationally - most notably in Tanzania, South Africa and Vietnam.

== People Associated with Kimmage Development Studies Centre ==
=== Directors ===
- Rev. Dr. Liam Carey, (1974-1975), first director of the programmes
- Rev. Jerry Creedon C.S.Sp (1975-1977)
- Rev. Richard (Dick) F. Quinn, C.S.Sp., (1977-1997)
- Mr. Paddy Reilly, (1997-2014)
- Dr. Rob Kevlihan, (2014-2018), executive director

== Facilities ==
=== Kimmage Manor ===
Kimmage Manor, in the centre of the campus, is a 19th-century building formerly owned by Sir Frederick Shaw BL, the Recorder of the City of Dublin and former MP for Dublin City.

In 1641, all the lands of Kimmage, Terenure and Milltown were in the hands of Peter Barnewall. At that time there was a castle in good repair on the lands of Kimmage. There were various owners and tenants through the years Rocque's map from the mid eighteenth century shows extensive buildings on the location of the present Manor House. In 1829, Frederick Shaw with his wife and family came to live in Kimmage. They occupied an L-shaped section of the present manor building. This embraces the present manor basement, the mezzanine floor used today as meeting room, classroom and office. The top floor comprises the present staff office, another classroom, administration office and MA coordinator’s office. This L-shaped section is at least 250 years old.

Within two years of their arrival, the Shaw family had constructed a two-storey addition to the south side of the L-shaped existing building and more than doubled their floor area. The front entrance, entrance hall, reception area and staircase were built. On the same floor reception rooms which later became a classroom, the computer room, and the Friere room were added. Upstairs there were bedrooms, which later became an administrative office, the DEA office, the KDSC Director’s office, the boardroom, and assistant director’s office. These rooms are approximately one hundred and seventy five years old. The Shaw family had remodelled Kimmage House until it acquired its unique Tudor style with triangular gables, spiral turrets and tall chimneys and false window.

Sir Frederick Shaw lived here until his death in 1876. His family moved to Bushy Park and Kimmage House was leased to various tenants.

=== Other facilities ===
In addition to the Manor building, Kimmage DSC also had student accommodation, a library and a student canteen.
