= Mellemfolkeligt Samvirke =

Danish political advocacy organisation

Coordinates: 55.6892°N 12.5603°E

Mellemfolkeligt Samvirke (ActionAid Denmark) is a Danish, politically independent humanitarian non-governmental organisation that fights for a more just and sustainable world. The organisation is the Danish member of the global federation ActionAid International. It works for increased understanding and solidarity between the peoples of the world, as well as promoting global development based on the sustainable use and just distribution of wealth and resources. It has a special focus on equality, social movements and youth activism, climate justice and refugee and minority rights.

ActionAid Denmark started as Fredsvenners Hjælpearbejde in 1944. In 1946 the organisation changed its name to Mellemfolkeligt Samvirke, and in 1974 it adopted open membership. The organisation's highest authority is the Council, whose members are individuals and organizations elected by the members. Council elections are conducted annually and all members are eligible to run for election.

Via its volunteer programme Global Contact, it sends hundreds of volunteers abroad every year through cultural exchanges, study trips and volunteer placements.

In 1994 in association with the Irish Kimmage Development Studies Centre, the MS Training Centre for Development Cooperation(MS-TCDC) began running of a Certificate in Community Development course, in Arusha, Tanzania. In 2001 as part of the partnership with, Kimmage DSC a Diploma in Development Studies was offered, which in 2004 became the Level 7 BA Degree in Development Studies, which is validated by the Irish governments Higher Education and Training Awards Council(HETAC). The course is recognised by the Tanzanian governments National Council for Technical Education(NACTE).
