= Christ the King College =

College in Bo, Sierra Leone

Christ the King College (CKC)
- Type: Private School
- Established: 1953
- Founders: Mother Marie Louise De Meester
- Affiliations: University of Sierra Leone
- Location: Bo, Sierra Leone
- Website: http://www.cobauk.cwc.net/

Christ the King College (CKC) is a secondary school founded in 1953 in Bo, Sierra Leone. The school was founded by Mother Marie Louise De Meester in 1953 under the direction of Archbishop Thomas Joseph Brosnahan. The Christ the King College is regarded as one of the most influential schools in West Africa due to its tradition of hardworking teachers and student leadership. Academically, it is considered the leading secondary school in public examinations such as Basic Education Certificate Educations (B.E.C.E) as well as the higher West African Senior Secondary School Examination Council. CKC primarily serves Sierra Leone, but also has international students from Liberia, Gambia, Ghana and Nigeria. Many prominent politicians and business leaders have graduated from CKC.

== History ==
Under the direction of Archbishop Thomas Joseph Brosnahan, Christ the King College was founded and built by Roman Catholic missionaries of the Holy Ghost Order led by Reverend Michael Corbett of Mitchelstown, County Cork, Ireland.

The school itself was founded by Mother Marie Louise De Meester in 1954. When the first students arrived, Archbishop Joseph Ganda, who was a Deacon at the time, was a French teacher at the school.

The original site later became the St Francis Primary School.

Because of the school's reputation, it became the favorite of Sierra Leone's most prominent families and it soon saw the children of paramount chiefs and politicians among its student body earning it the moniker "The Royal College of the South".

== Notable alumni ==
Some notable graduates of CKC include:

- Solomon Berewa
- Bishop Patrick Daniel Koroma
- Charles Margai
- Kandeh Yumkella
