= Robert Ellison (Roman Catholic bishop) =

Irish Roman Catholic prelate (1942–2024)

His Excellency Robert Ellison
- Bishop Emeritus of Banjul
- Appointed: 25 February 2006
- Term ended: 30 November 2017
- Predecessor: Michael J. Cleary
- Successor: Gabriel Mendy

Personal details
- Born: 12 February 1942 Dublin, Ireland
- Died: 22 February 2024 (aged 82) Kimmage Manor, Dublin, Ireland

Robert Patrick Ellison (12 February 1942 – 22 February 2024) was an Irish Roman Catholic prelate who was Bishop Emeritus of the Diocese of Banjul, Gambia.

== Biography ==
Robert Patrick Ellison was born in Dublin, County Dublin, Ireland. He went to Blackrock College secondary school, and earned a Science Degree from University College Dublin, following which he went to Rome to study theology at Gregorian University and in 1970 was awarded an STL in dogma. After three years in Gambia he returned to study at the Pontifical Institute of Arab and Islamic Studies in Rome. He was ordained a priest on 6 July 1969, for the Congregation of the Holy Spirit.

On 25 February 2006, he was appointed Bishop of the Diocese of Banjul. He was ordained a bishop on 14 May 2006. The Principal Consecrator was Bishop Michael J. Cleary. Pope Francis accepted his canonical resignation on 30 November 2017.

Ellison died at Kimmage Manor, Dublin, on 22 February 2024, at the age of 82.

Catholic Church titles
Preceded by Michael J. Cleary	Bishop of Banjul; 2006–2017	Succeeded by Gabriel Mendy
