= Kibaha education centre =

Kibaha Education Centre (KEC) is an education institution located in Kibaha in Tanzania. It Is situated at 6°47'22.2"S, 38°58'28.7"E in Kibaha municipal council. KEC was established in 1963 under the co-sponsorship o five countries, the government of Tanganyika (now Tanzania) on one side as well as four Nordic countries (Denmark, Finland, Norway and Sweden). Before handing over to the Tanzania government in 1970, KEC was known as the Nordic-Tanganyika project.

== Management ==
KEC is managed by a Board of directors consisting of representatives from the Ministry of Agriculture Livestock and Fisheries, Ministry of Health, Community Development, Gender, Elderly and Children (MoHCDEC), Ministry of Education Science and Technology (MoEST), Ministry of Finance and planning and Prime minister office through Region Administration and Local Government (RALG), as well as three other members appointed by the board.
