= Patrick Daniel Koroma =

Bishop of the Diocese of Kenema

- Bishop of the Diocese of Kenema (Deceased)
- Church: Roman Catholic Church
- See: Roman Catholic Diocese of Kenema
- In office: 2002–2018
- Predecessor: John C. O'Riordan, C.S.Sp
- Successor: Henry Aruna

Orders
- Ordination: 18 Dec 1977
- Consecration: 26 Apr 2002

Personal details
- Born: 4 May 1950 Jenneh, Kenema District, British Sierra Leone
- Died: 14 December 2018 (aged 68) Freetown, Sierra Leone

Styles of Patrick Daniel Koroma
- Reference style: His Excellency; The Most Reverend
- Spoken style: Your Excellency
- Religious style: Bishop

Patrick Daniel Koroma, C.S.Sp., MOR (4 May 1950 – 14 December 2018) was the bishop of the Catholic Church in Kenema, Sierra Leone.

== Early life ==
Koroma was born to Mamie and Bockarie Koroma. He was born and raised in the village of Jenneh, Kandu, Leppiama Chiefdom, Kenema District.

=== Education ===
From 1958 to 1962, Koroma received his primary education at the parish school at Gbado. From 1962 to 1965 he studied at the parish school in Blama. He graduated from Christ the King College in Bo in 1970.

Koroma received his training at Saints Peter and Paul Major Seminary in Ibadan, Nigeria. He did his post graduate studies in Education at the University of Sierra Leone.

== Priestly life ==
He was ordained on 18 December 1977 at the Immaculate Heart Pro-Cathedral of Bo by Thomas Brosnahan, Archbishop of Freetown and Bo. He began his career as a priest in the Metropolitan Archdiocese of Freetown.

In 1978, he became Assistant Parish Priest of St. Francis Parish in Bo. A year later he became the parish priest.

In 1981, Koroma became Chaplain and Lecturer at his alma mater Christ the King College at Bo and he was also the Catholic Youth Chaplain of the Archdiocese of Freetown and Bo.

Koroma was Parish Priest at St. Joseph’s Parish, Njala Komboya, and St. Peter Claver Parish, Damballa from 1982 until 1984. He served as Parish Priest at the Immaculate Conception Parish, Waterloo in 1984 and then at Sacred Heart Cathedral, Freetown in 1990. From 1992 until 2002 he served the parish at St. Edwards’s Catholic Community in Kingtom as well as St. George’s Catholic Community at the Murray Town Army barracks.

From 1984 until 2002, Koroma was Catholic Education Secretary for Sierra Leone. He was appointed National Co-ordinator of the National Catholic Development and Caritas Office in Freetown in 1999 and held this office until 2002.

On 26 April 2002, he was appointed third Bishop of the Diocese of Kenema by Pope John Paul II and consecrated 29 June 2002. He succeeded Bishop John C. O'Riordan.

In 2008, Bishop Koroma was admitted to Gemelli Hospital in Rome, Italy where he was fitted with a Cardioverter Defibrillator.

== Death ==
Bishop Koroma died on 14 December 2018. He was buried on 4 January 2019 and his requiem mass was attended by David J. Francis the Chief Minister of Sierra Leone, former Vice President Solomon Berewa, former Vice President Dr Joe Demby, other cabinet ministers, members of parliaments, paramount chiefs, the clergy and President Bio described him as "a man of God who served the nation and the world."

Pope Francis sent a letter and described Bishop Koroma as "a Holy man of God that lived his entire life in the servitude of God and men".

== Honors ==
On 26 April 2013, Bishop Koroma was made an officer of the Order of the Rokel.

Catholic Church titles
| Preceded by John C. O'Riordan, C.S.Sp | Bishop of Kenema; 2002–2018 | Succeeded by vacant |
