= Sacred Heart Cathedral, Freetown =

Coordinates: 8.48936°N 13.23318°W

Sacred Heart Cathedral
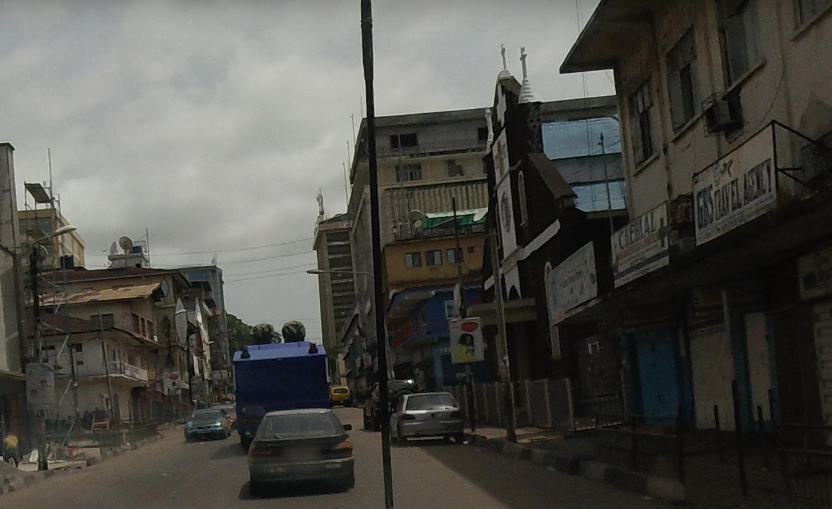
- Sacred Heart Cathedral
- Location: Freetown
- Country: Sierra Leone
- Denomination: Roman Catholic Church

The Sacred Heart Cathedral also simply called Cathedral of Freetown, is a religious building that is affiliated with the Catholic Church and is located in the Howe street of the town of Freetown, capital and most populous city of the African country of Sierra Leone.

== Construction ==
Work on its construction began in November 1884 and was dedicated on October 27, 1887.

It is a temple that follows the Roman or Latin rite and functions as the headquarters of the Metropolitan Archdiocese of Freetown (Archidioecesis liberae Urbis) which was created by Pope Paul VI by bull "Quantum boni". It is one of the four existing Catholic cathedrals in that nation being the other dedicated to the "Immaculate Heart of Mary" in Bo, to "St. Paul" in Kenema and of "Our Lady of Fatima" in Makeni.

It is under the pastoral responsibility of Archbishop Edward Tamba Charles.

== See also ==
- Roman Catholicism in Sierra Leone
- Sacred Heart Cathedral (disambiguation)
