= Diocese of Banjul =

Catholic diocese in the Gambia

Coordinates: 13.4531°N 16.5775°W

Diocese of Banjul Dioecesis Baniulensis

Location
- Country: Gambia
- Metropolitan: Immediately subject to the Holy See

Statistics
- Area: 10,403 km^{2} (4,017 sq mi)
- Population: Total; Catholics: (as of 2006); 1,787,000; 42,400 (2.4%)

Information
- Rite: Latin Rite
- Cathedral: Cathedral of Our Lady of the Assumption

Current leadership
- Pope: Leo XIV
- Bishop: Bishop Gabriel Mendy, C.S.Sp.

The Roman Catholic Diocese of Banjul (Latin: Baniulen(sis)) is a diocese located in the city of Banjul in the Gambia.

== History ==
- January 18, 1848: Father Ronarc'h and Father Warlop, Holy Ghost Fathers, arrive in Banjul
- January 18, 1849: Ronarc'h and Warlop establish the mission of Sainte Marie de Gambie
- May 6, 1931: Established as Mission “sui iuris” of Gambia from the Apostolic Vicariate of Senegambia
- March 8, 1951: Promoted as the Apostolic Prefecture of Bathurst in Gambia
- June 24, 1957: Promoted as Diocese of Bathurst in Gambia
- May 9, 1974: Renamed as Diocese of Banjul

== Leadership, in reverse chronogical order ==
- Bishops of Banjul (Roman rite), below
  - Bishop Gabriel Mendy, C.S.Sp. (November 30, 2017 – ...)
  - Bishop Robert Patrick Ellison, C.S.Sp. (February 25, 2006 – November 30, 2017)
  - Bishop Michael Joseph Cleary, C.S.Sp. (January 24, 1981 – February 25, 2006)
  - Bishop Michael Joseph Moloney, C.S.Sp. (May 9, 1974 – November 14, 1980); see below
- Bishops of Bathurst in Gambia (Roman Rite), below
  - Bishop Michael Joseph Moloney, C.S.Sp. (June 24, 1957 – May 9, 1974); see above & below
- Prefects Apostolic of Bathurst in Gambia (Roman Rite), below
  - Fr. Michael Joseph Moloney, C.S.Sp. (later Bishop) (1951 – June 24, 1957); see above
- Ecclesiastical Superiors of Gambia (Roman Rite), below
  - Fr. Matteo Farrelly, C.S.Sp. (June 7, 1946 – 1951)
  - Fr. Giovanni Meehan, C.S.Sp. (October 16, 1931 – 1946)

== See also ==
- Religion in Gambia
- Christianity in Gambia
- Catholic Church in the Gambia
