= Dardistown =

Townland in County Dublin, Ireland

Coordinates: 53.4141°N 6.2333°W

Dardistown (Irish: Baile an Dairdisigh) is a small townland in the civil parish of Santry, located in County Dublin, Ireland. The townland, which is approximately 69.6 acres (0.28 km^{2}) in area, had a population of 12 people as of the 2011 census.

Located southeast of Dublin Airport, one of the long term car parks for the airport is in the townland. Dardistown Cemetery is on the Collinstown section of the old Swords Road.

Two streams, the Cuckoo Stream and the Turnapin Stream, pass through Dardistown; they later meet to form the Mayne River.
