= Catholic Church in Sierra Leone =

- Type: National polity
- Classification: Catholic
- Orientation: Latin
- Governance: Episcopal
- Pope: Pope Leo XIV
- President: Archbishop Edward Tamba Charles
- Region: Sierra Leone
- Language: English, Latin
- Headquarters: Sacred Heart Cathedral, Freetown
- Official website: Catholic Bishops Conference of Sierra Leone

The Catholic Church in Sierra Leone is part of the worldwide Catholic Church, under the spiritual leadership of the Pope in Rome.

According to 2011 data, there are approximately 300,000 Catholics in Sierra Leone - around 5% of the total population. The country is divided into four dioceses in one ecclesiastical province.

== Origins ==
Catholic missionaries were active in the coastal regions of Sierra Leone from the early sixteenth century although only a few people converted to Catholicism. Significant conversions began in the 19th century due to the efforts of Jesuit and Congregation of the Holy Spirit missions.

== Organization ==
The Catholic Church in Sierra Leone is organized in a Latin hierarchy and consists of a single ecclesiastical province that regulates all of Sierra Leone. This comprises the Metropolitan Archdiocese of Freetown and three suffragan dioceses.

The Catholic Church in Sierra Leone does not have a national Episcopal Conference, however it is part of joint one for the Gambia and Sierra Leone, which hosts it in Freetown.

There are no titular sees. All defunct jurisdictions are precursors of present sees.

There formally is an Apostolic Nunciature (embassy-level papal diplomatic representation) to Sierra Leone and an Apostolic Nunciature to The Gambia, but both are vested in the Apostolic Nunciature to Liberia (in its capital Monrovia).

=== The Metropolitan Archdiocese of Freetown ===
It was established as the Vicariate Apostolic of Sierra Leone, on 13 April 1858 by Pope Pius IX, taking territory from the Vicariate Apostolic of Two Guineas and Senegambia. It itself lost territory in 1897 to the Prefecture Apostolic of Guinea Francese and in 1903 to the Prefecture Apostolic of Liberia.

The vicariate was elevated to the status of a diocese, taking the name of Freetown and Bo on 18 April 1950. In 1952, the Prefecture Apostolic of Makeni was split off from its territory. The diocese was elevated to an archdiocese on 11 November 1970, at which time also the Diocese of Kenema was split off.

On 15 January 2010, the Archdiocese of Freetown since then.

=== The Episcopal Diocese of Kenema ===
The Diocese of Kenema is a diocese in the ecclesiastical province of Freetown in Sierra Leone. It was established on 11 November 1970, with its territory being split off from the diocese of Freetown and Bo. The Cathedral is the St. Paul's Cathedral in Kenema.

=== The Episcopal Diocese of Makeni ===
The Diocese of Makeni is a diocese in the ecclesiastical province of Freetown in Sierra Leone. The Cathedral is the Our Lady of Fatima Cathedral in Makeni.

- April 3, 1952: Established as Apostolic Prefecture of Makeni from territory of the Diocese of Freetown and Bo
- February 24, 1962: Elevated to the status of a diocese

=== The Episcopal Diocese of Bo ===
In January 2011, the Diocese of Bo (Dioecesis Boënsis) was created in 2011 by Pope Benedict XVI through the bull Petrini ministerii.

The seat of the diocese is at the Immaculate Church of Mary where the Roman Rite is observed and serves as the seat of the Diocese of Bo (Dioecesis Boënsis) which was created in 2011 by Pope Benedict XVI through the bull Petrini ministerii.

There are about 50,000 Catholics under the jurisdiction of the diocese.

== See also ==
- List of Catholic dioceses in Gambia and Sierra Leone
