= Roman Catholic Diocese of Bo =

Roman Catholic diocese in Sierra Leone

Coordinates: 7.9567°N 11.7386°W

Diocese of Bo Boënsis

Location
- Country: Sierra Leone
- Territory: Southern Province
- Ecclesiastical province: Freetown

Statistics
- Area: 19,694 km^{2} (7,604 sq mi)
- Population: Total; Catholics: (as of 2012); 1 200 000; 50 000 (4.2%)

Information
- Sui iuris church: Latin Church
- Rite: Roman Rite
- Established: 2011
- Cathedral: Immaculate Heart of Mary, Bo
- Secular priests: 35

Current leadership
- Pope: Francis
- Bishop: Charles Allieu Matthew Campbell

Map
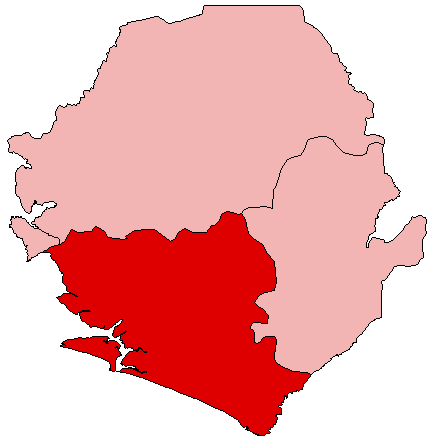

The Roman Catholic Diocese of Bo was created in January 2011, split off from the Archdiocese of Freetown. There are about 50,000 Roman Catholics under the jurisdiction of the diocese. Its first and present bishop is Charles Allieu Matthew Campbell.

== Bishops ==
=== Bishop of Bo ===
- Charles Allieu Matthew Campbell (15 Jan 2011 -)

== See also ==
- Immaculate Heart of Mary Cathedral, Bo

== Sources ==
- Catholic hierarchy entry on Bo diocese
- Pope Benedict XVI: Apostolic Constitution Boënsis
