= Archdiocese of Freetown =

Latin Catholic territory in Sierra Leone

Archdiocese of Freetown Archidiœcesis Liberae Urbis
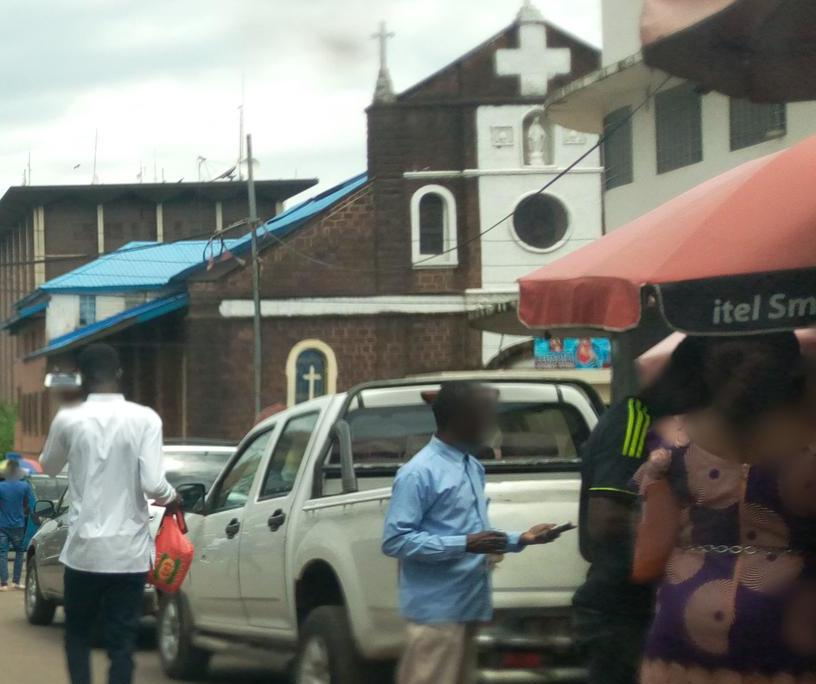
- Sacred Heart Cathedral

Location
- Country: Sierra Leone
- Coordinates: 8.4833°N 13.2333°W

Statistics
- Area: 1,806 sq mi (4,680 km^{2})
- Population: Total; Catholics: (as of 2021); 1,872,675; 87,500 (4.7%%)
- Parishes: 11

Information
- Denomination: Catholic Church
- Sui iuris church: Latin Church
- Rite: Roman Rite
- Established: April 18, 1950; 76 years ago
- Cathedral: Sacred Heart Cathedral, Freetown
- Secular priests: 41

Current leadership
- Pope: Leo XIV
- Archbishop: Edward Tamba Charles
- Suffragans: Bo, Kenema, Makeni

The Archdiocese of Freetown (Archidioecesis Liberae Urbis) is a Latin Church ecclesiastical territory or diocese of the Catholic Church in Sierra Leone. Its episcopal see is the city of Freetown, the capital and most populous city of the African country. It is a metropolitan see with three suffragan dioceses in its ecclesiastical province.

== History ==
The territory was established as the Vicariate Apostolic of Sierra Leone, on 13 April 1858 by Pope Pius IX, taking territory from the Vicariate Apostolic of Two Guineas and Senegambia. It itself lost territory in 1897 to the Prefecture Apostolic of Guinea Francese and in 1903 to the Prefecture Apostolic of Liberia.

The vicariate was elevated to the status of a diocese, taking the name of Freetown and Bo on 18 April 1950. In 1952, the Prefecture Apostolic of Makeni was split off from its territory. The diocese was elevated to an archdiocese on 11 November 1970, at which time also the Diocese of Kenema was split off.

On 15 January 2011, the Roman Catholic Diocese of Bo was split off the Archdiocese of Freetown and Bo which is called Archdiocese of Freetown since then.

== Geography ==
The diocese covers an area of 4,677 square kilometres (1,806 sq mi), around the Sierra Leone capital city of Freetown.

The archidiocese has three suffragan dioceses, those of Bo, Kenema and Makeni.

== Cathedral ==
The cathedral of the Freetown archdiocese is the Sacred Heart Cathedral, also sometimes called simply the Cathedral of Freetown. The cathedral is located in the Howe street of the town of Freetown.

Work on its construction began in November 1884 and was dedicated on October 27, 1887. The Sacred Heart Cathedral follows the Roman rite.

== Ordinaries ==
- Melchior-Marie-Joseph de Marion-Brésillac MEP (1858–1859)
- John Joseph O'Gorman CSSp (1903–1932)
- Bartholomew Stanislaus Wilson CSSp (1933–1936)
- Ambrose Kelly CSSp (1937–1952)
- Thomas Joseph Brosnahan CSSp (1952–1980)
- Joseph Henry Ganda (1980–2007)
- Edward Tamba Charles (2008–present)

== See also ==
- Roman Catholicism in Sierra Leone
- List of Roman Catholic dioceses in Sierra Leone
