= University School (Ohio) =

Private boys schools in Cleveland, Ohio, US

Location
- Shaker Heights and Hunting Valley, Ohio; United States; 41°29′10″N 81°25′42″W (Upper School Campus); 41°28′56″N 81°31′57″W (Lower School Campus)

Information
- Type: Private, Day, college-prep
- Motto: Responsibility, Loyalty, Consideration
- Established: 1890
- Founder: Newton M. Anderson
- Sister school: Hathaway Brown
- Campus Director: Lower School: Lisa Cummings, Middle School: Lindsay Arnoult, Upper School: Krystopher Perry
- Head of school: Patrick Gallagher
- Faculty: 128.5 (on an FTE basis)
- Grades: Jr. K–12
- Gender: Boys
- Enrollment: 441 middle/lower 408 upper 849 total (2023–2024)
- Student to teacher ratio: 6.8
- Campus: Suburban
- Campus size: Upper: 264 acres (107 ha); Lower: 33 acres (13 ha)
- Houses: Anderson House, Cruikshank House, Goodwille House, McCarraher House, Hawley House, Peters House, Pettee House, Sanders House, Murray House, McKinley House
- Colors: Maroon and black
- Song: Hail, University!
- Fight song: Anniversary ("Fight") Song
- Athletics: 13 interscholastic sports
- Athletics conference: Independent
- Team name: Preppers
- Accreditation: National Association of Independent Schools
- Endowment: $142 Million (2025)
- Tuition: $15,423–$39,160 (2023–24)
- Website: us.edu

University School (US) is an all-boys, private, Junior Kindergarten–12 school with two campus locations in the Greater Cleveland area of Ohio. The campus located in Shaker Heights serves junior kindergarten through eighth grade students, while the campus in Hunting Valley serves ninth through twelfth grade students.

University School is a founding member of the International Boys' Schools Coalition (IBSC) and a member of the Center for the Study of Boys' and Girls' Lives and Cleveland Council of Independent Schools.

== History and headmasters ==
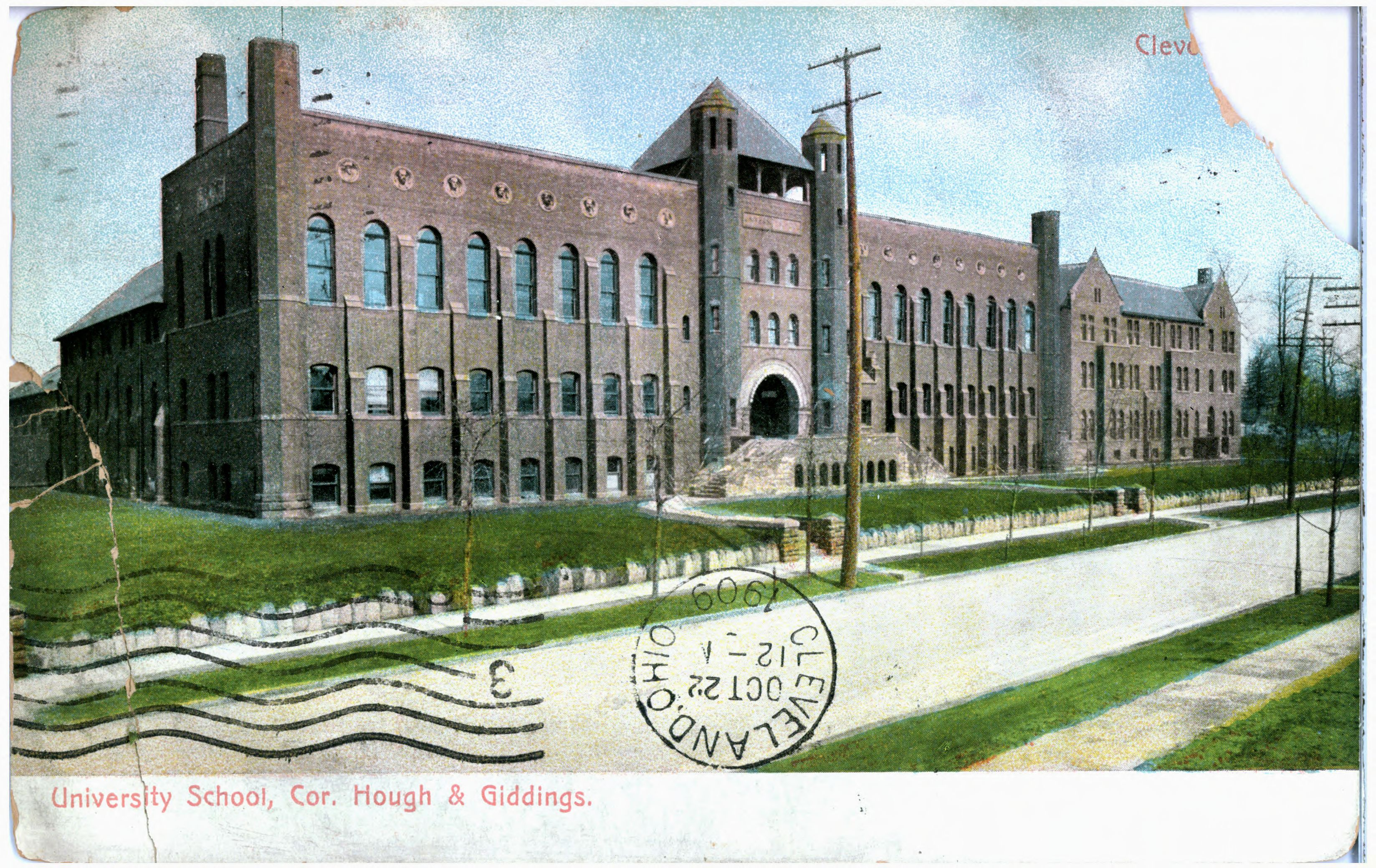
Postcard of the former University School building in Hough

In 1890 the founding headmaster of the school, Newton M. Anderson, established University School. The school's first building was erected on 10 acres (40,000 m^{2}) at the corner of Hough Avenue and East 71st Street in Cleveland.

At the turn of the century, Headmaster George D. Pettee led the entire student body to the Pan-American Exposition in Buffalo, New York, in 1901. A few years later in 1908 Headmaster Harry S. Peters led University School during two World Wars, the Great Depression and, in 1926, to the 36-acre (150,000 m^{2}) campus in Shaker Heights. He was the longest-tenured headmaster in University School history; he left the school in 1947. That same year Headmaster Harold L. Cruikshank oversaw the building of the Hanna Wing on the Shaker Campus and guided the school through the end of World War II to the beginning of the 1960s.

Under the leadership of Roland P. McKinley, the Upper School moved, in 1970, from Shaker Heights to nearly 200 acres (0.81 km^{2}) of meadows and woodland in Hunting Valley.

In 1988, Richard A. Hawley, an author and educator, became the sixth headmaster of US. With the support of the US community, Conway Hall on the Shaker Campus and the William S. Kilroy '43 Field House in Hunting Valley were built during Hawley's tenure.

Stephen S. Murray became the seventh headmaster for University School in 2005 after Hawley's departure. Murray led the School in the fundraising and construction of a nearly $100 million, 52,000 square-foot academic wing, which features classrooms and interactive technology. Extensive renovation of the original classroom building has allowed for facilities for the visual and performing arts.

After it was announced in August 2014 that Headmaster Stephen Murray would leave US to become the 13th headmaster of The Lawrenceville School in New Jersey, Benjamin I. Rein of the Collegiate School in Richmond, Virginia, assumed the position of headmaster in mid-2015. Rein left the school in late 2016, with Rick Bryan assuming the duties as the school's first alumnus headmaster. Headmaster Bryan stepped down in January 2018 due to allegations that he had mishandled a number of sexual misconduct cases at his previous school, the Nichols School. In the wake of Bryan's departure, dean of faculty and English teacher Patrick Gallagher was named interim headmaster by the school's board of trustees. On September 22, 2018, the school's board of trustees announced that Patrick Gallagher would officially assume the role of headmaster, following an eight-month search period.

== House system ==
University School has a House system, similar to that of British tradition. Every student is assigned to one of ten houses, which integrate students from all grades and provide a structure for the boys to connect between grades with each other for companionship and support. Each house has a faculty head, the Head of House, and a senior leader, the Prefect. One student from each house is elected during his junior year to lead the house for his senior year as a Prefect. The ten houses, honoring notable previous headmasters, faculty, or students, are listed below:

- Anderson House
- Cruikshank House
- Goodwillie House
- Hawley House (Formerly Brown House)
- McCarraher House
- McKinley House
- Murray House (Formerly Pickands House)
- Peters House
- Pettee House
- Sanders House

Each house competes annually at Founders' Day. Held each fall, this event lets all students in grades 5 through 12 compete in field day-like activities at the Upper School. Games played include capture the flag, soccer, tug-o-war, the egg toss, and more. Students compete against members of the other houses. The winner of Founders' Day gets house points that go towards the end of year House Cup.

== Publications ==
- The University School Journal is published twice a year for the alumni, parents and friends of the school.
- The US News is published monthly by students. Founded in 1898, it is the oldest school newspaper in Ohio. In 2014, The US News became digital.
- The Record, released annually, is a compilation of the artistic and literary achievement of University School boys including poetry, short stories, photography, and, more recently, drawing.
- The Mabian is the Upper School's yearbook, published every year since 1919. The first three letters of the name "Mabian" come from the school's colors, maroon and black, and "...ian" means "of the"; "of the maroon and black."
- The Tower is the Lower/Middle School counterpart of The Mabian.

== Athletics ==
The school traditionally has a rivalry with Western Reserve Academy, with the football games being the highlight of each school's season throughout the 20th century, starting with the first meeting in 1895. It is most well known for its success in swimming.

US fields varsity teams in thirteen sports, five in the winter season and four in the fall and the spring seasons: football, soccer, cross country, and golf in the fall; ice hockey, wrestling, swimming, squash, and basketball in the winter; and lacrosse, tennis, track and field, and baseball in the spring.

University School competes in the Premier Athletic Conference (PAC), an eight-team conference. The cross country, wrestling, basketball, track and field and baseball teams began competing in this conference in 2009. Football began its PAC schedule in the fall of 2011.

The 81,000-square-foot (7,500 m^{2}) Kilroy Field House at the Hunting Valley Campus is a multi-purpose indoor practice facility featuring two basketball courts, three squash courts, a 200-meter cantilevered indoor track, and practice areas for track events. The complex also includes a fitness center.

Wrestling rooms, a gymnasium and 25-yard indoor swimming pool with a separate diving well complete the indoor facilities at the Hunting Valley Campus. Outdoors there are a football stadium and a new turf football field, an all-weather track, four soccer and other practice fields, two baseball diamonds, and seven tennis courts.

The physical education facilities at the Shaker Campus include a football field; 400-meter track; three baseball fields; two soccer fields; eight tennis courts; double-size gymnasium; wrestling room; four-lane, 25-meter indoor swimming pool; and a rock climbing wall.

In 2013, University School's student-created and student-led sports broadcasting network, USPN, started streaming live coverage of the school's football, soccer, basketball, hockey, lacrosse and baseball games.

In 2014, University School's squash team won the Division IV national championship at the U.S. High School Team Squash Championships in Philadelphia, Pennsylvania.

== State championships ==
- Golf: 1990, 2003, 2006, 2007, 2008
- Lacrosse (OHSLA): 1999, 2008, 2009
- Swimming & Diving: 2009, 2010, 2011, 2012, 2018, 2019, 2022, 2023, 2024, 2025
- Ice hockey: 2003, 2009
- Tennis: 1990, 1992, 1993, 1996, 2002, 2005, 2012, 2017

== Notable alumni ==
Academia, law, and medicine

- Darrick E. Antell, MD, plastic surgeon known for his studies on aging and twins, class of 1969
- Richard "Rick" Banks, Stanford Law School professor and author, class of 1983
- George Crile Jr., MD, general surgeon who advocated for elimination of unnecessary surgery (radical breast surgery), 50-year career at Cleveland Clinic and headed the Cleveland Clinic's Department of General Surgery, son of Cleveland Clinic co-founder George Crile, class of 1925
- Peter G. Delaney, MD, co-founder of LFR International and Prince Michael International Road Safety Award winner, class of 2014
- Arthur Laffer, economist and creator of the Laffer Curve, class of 1958
- Rainer K. Sachs, mathematical physicist responsible for the Goldberg–Sachs theorem and Sachs–Wolfe effect, class of 1949

Arts, journalism and entertainment

- Jim Backus actor, with a career spanning five decades in Hollywood, he was best known for Thurston Howell III on the 1960s sitcom Gilligan's Island, and inducted to the Hollywood Walk of Fame in 1960, class of 1931
- Austin Pendleton, actor, class of 1956
- Craig Doerge, musician, class of 1962
- Tom Griswold, radio host, class of 1971
- John Bell, lead singer and rhythm guitarist for the southern rock band Widespread Panic, class of 1980
- Bob Harris, author, TV writer (Bones, CSI:), eight-time Jeopardy! winner, class of 1980
- Michael Ruhlman, author, class of 1981
- Robert Kovacik, NBC Los Angeles anchor and reporter, class of 1982
- Jason White, singer-songwriter, class of 1985
- Lee Kravitz, author, former editor-in-chief of Parade magazine
- Warren Brown, founder of CakeLove, entrepreneur and former host of the Food Network show Sugar Rush', class of 1989
- Chris Rose, host of the popular sports program The Best Damn Sports Show Period, class of 1989
- Anthony Doerr, Pulitzer Prize-winning novelist (All the Light We Cannot See), class of 1991
- Joshua Radin, musical artist, class of 1992
- Rob Mayes, actor, musician, model; John in John Dies at the End, class of 2003
- Alex Falberg, actor, musician, songwriter, co-founder of PigPen Theater Company, class of 2006
- Jack Stratton, musician, songwriter, producer, co-founder of Vulfpeck, class of 2006
- Chris McCarrell, Broadway actor; Marius in Les Misérables and Percy in The Lightning Thief: The Percy Jackson Musical, class of 2009

Business and philanthropy

- George Gund II, businessman, philanthropist class of 1905
- Rob Markey, business strategist, author, co-creator of the Net Promoter System, class of 1982
- William Oberndorf, billionaire hedge fund manager
- James Park, CEO and co-founder of Fitbit
- Patrick S. Parker, former chairman and CEO, Parker Hannifin Corp., class of 1947
- Jerry Yue, founder of Brain Technologies

Sports

- Ronnie Anderson, former NFL wide receiver, class of 1993
- Nick Caserio, General Manager of the Houston Texans, class of 1994
- Jason Garrett, former head coach of the Dallas Cowboys, former NFL quarterback, class of 1984
- John Garrett, former NFL wide receiver, class of 1983
- Judd Garrett, former NFL running back; current Director of Pro Scouting for the Dallas Cowboys, class of 1985
- Charlie Horton, Major League Soccer, professional goalkeeper for D.C. United, class of 2013
- Dave Kaval, current MLB executive, class of 1994
- Chris Korb, Major League Soccer, professional soccer player for D.C. United, class of 2006
- Jamie Moriarty, Olympian, competed in bobsled as a member of team USA in the 2010 Vancouver Winter Olympics, class of 1999
- Derek Rucker, former international professional basketball player, class of 1984
- Chuck Seelbach, former Major League Baseball pitcher for the Detroit Tigers, class of 1966
