= Jerry Yue =

Chinese-American inventor (born 1992)

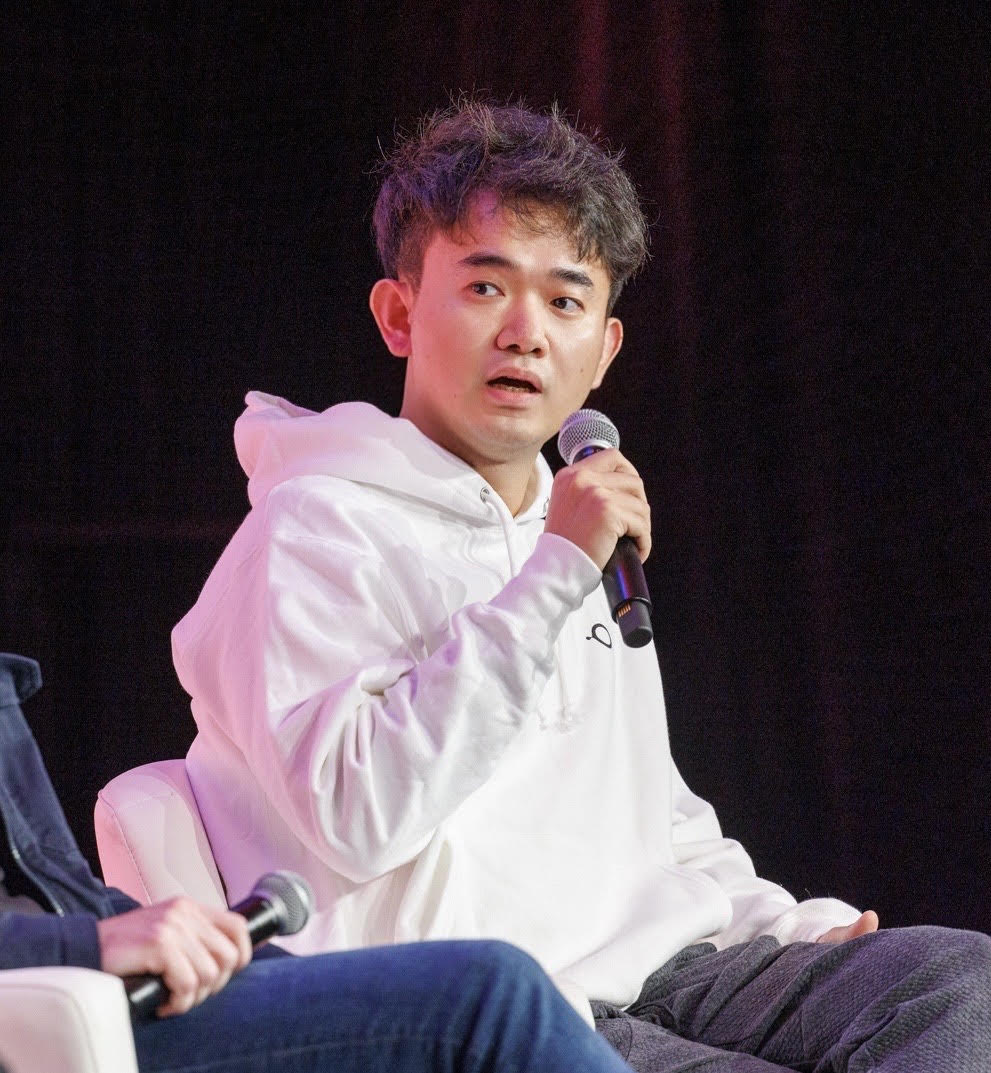
- Jerry Yue in 2024
- Born: December 14, 1992 (age 33); Xi’an, China
- Education: University of Illinois at Urbana-Champaign
- Occupation: Technology entrepreneur
- Title: CEO at Brain Technologies, Inc.

Jerry Yue (born December 14, 1992) is a Chinese-American inventor and entrepreneur. He is the founder and CEO of Brain Technologies.

== Early life and education ==
Yue was born in Xi’an, China, to a family of academics. His mother Haihong Huo is an English literature professor, and his father Kaiduan Yue is a physicist.

Yue moved to the United States for education, attending University School in Ohio, where he participated in the United States of America Mathematical Olympiad (USAMO). He later studied computer engineering at the University of Illinois at Urbana-Champaign but left to pursue his entrepreneurial interests.

== Career ==
=== Benlai Life Ltd. ===
In 2012, Yue co-founded Benlai Life Ltd., which grew into a significant online grocery delivery service in China.

=== Brain Technologies, Inc. ===
Yue founded Brain Technologies in the United States, where he focused on developing AI interfaces. This included work on one-shot learning in natural language processing (NLP), which has implications for large language models (LLMs).

The company received investments from various investors. In 2020, they launched Natural AI, an AI interface.

In 2023, Brain Technologies introduced Imagica AI, a platform for AI application development.

=== App-less AI Phone ===
At the Mobile World Congress 2024, Yue was involved in a collaboration with Deutsche Telekom and Qualcomm to create an AI phone that operates without traditional applications, using AI to generate interfaces and manage tasks through voice commands. This device uses AI to dynamically generate interfaces and perform tasks via voice commands, revolutionizing mobile interaction.

== Honors ==
In 2022, Jerry Yue was listed in Forbes' "30 under 30" for his contributions to technology.
