= University of Illinois Urbana-Champaign =

Public university in Champaign County, Illinois, US

Coordinates: 40°6′38″N 88°13′42″W

- Former names: Illinois Industrial University (1867–1885); University of Illinois (1885–1982); University of Illinois at Urbana-Champaign (1982–2021)
- Motto: "Learning & Labor"
- Type: Public land-grant research university
- Established: 1867; 159 years ago
- Parent institution: University of Illinois System
- Accreditation: HLC
- Academic affiliations: AAU; U21; URA; sea-grant; space-grant
- Endowment: $3.8 billion (2025)
- Chancellor: Charles Lee Isbell Jr.
- Provost: John Coleman
- Faculty: 2,548
- Administrative staff: 8,803
- Students: 60,848 (2025)
- Undergraduates: 38,572 (2025)
- Postgraduates: 20,877 (2025)
- Location: Champaign County, Illinois, United States
- Campus: 6,370 acres (2,578 ha); Small city
- Newspaper: The Daily Illini
- Colors: Orange and blue
- Nickname: Fighting Illini
- Sporting affiliations: NCAA Division I FBS – Big Ten
- Website: illinois.edu

The University of Illinois Urbana-Champaign (Illinois, University of Illinois, U. of I., or UIUC) is a public land-grant research university in Champaign County, Illinois, United States. Established in 1867, it is the founding campus and flagship institution of the University of Illinois System. With over 59,000 students, the University of Illinois is one of the largest public universities by enrollment in the United States.

The university contains 16 schools and colleges and offers more than 150 undergraduate and over 100 graduate programs of study. The university holds 651 buildings on 6,370 acres (2,578 ha) and its annual operating budget in 2016 was over $2 billion. The University of Illinois Urbana-Champaign also operates a research park home to innovation centers for over 90 start-up companies and multinational corporations.

The University of Illinois Urbana-Champaign is a member of the Association of American Universities and is classified among "R1: Doctoral Universities – Very high research activity". In fiscal year 2019, research expenditures at Illinois totaled $652 million. The campus library system possesses the fourth-largest university library in the United States by holdings. The university also hosts the National Center for Supercomputing Applications.

The alumni, faculty members, or researchers of the university include 24 Nobel laureates, 27 Pulitzer Prize winners, two Fields medalists, and two Turing Award winners. Illinois athletic teams compete in Division I of the NCAA and are collectively known as the Fighting Illini. They are members of the Big Ten Conference and have won the second-most conference titles. Illinois Fighting Illini football won the Rose Bowl Game in 1947, 1952, 1964 and a total of five national championships. Illinois athletes have won 29 medals in Olympic events.

== History ==
=== Illinois Industrial University (1867–1885) ===
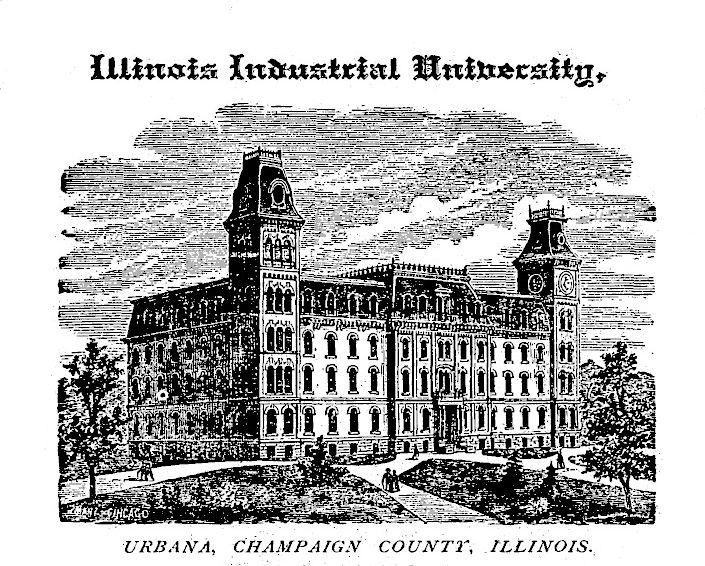
University Hall stood from 1871 until 1938 and was replaced by Gregory Hall and the Illini Union. Pieces were used in the erection of Hallene Gateway.

The University of Illinois, originally named "Illinois Industrial University", was one of the 37 universities created under the first Morrill Land-Grant Act, which provided public land for the creation of agricultural and industrial colleges and universities across the United States. Among several cities, Urbana was selected in 1867 as the site for the new school. From the beginning, President John Milton Gregory's desire to establish an institution firmly grounded in the liberal arts tradition was at odds with many state residents and lawmakers who wanted the university to offer classes based solely around "industrial education". The university opened for classes on March 2, 1868, and had two faculty members and 77 students.

The library, which opened with the school in 1868, started with 1,039 volumes. Subsequently, President Edmund J. James, in a speech to the board of trustees in 1912, proposed to create a research library. It is now one of the world's largest public academic collections. In 1870, the Mumford House was constructed as a model farmhouse for the school's experimental farm. The Mumford House remains the oldest structure on campus. The original University Hall (1871) was the fourth building built; it stood where the Illini Union stands today.

The University of Illinois' Undergraduate Library (UGL) was constructed underground to preserve open space on campus and to prevent casting shadows on the adjacent Morrow Plots, the oldest continually used experimental agricultural fields in the United States. This unique design inspired The Other Guys, a student a cappella group, to create the "Morrow Plots Song," humorously explaining that the library was built underground "'Cause you can't throw shade on the corn". The song has become a beloved piece among students and alumni, celebrating the university's history and traditions.

=== University of Illinois (1885–1977) ===
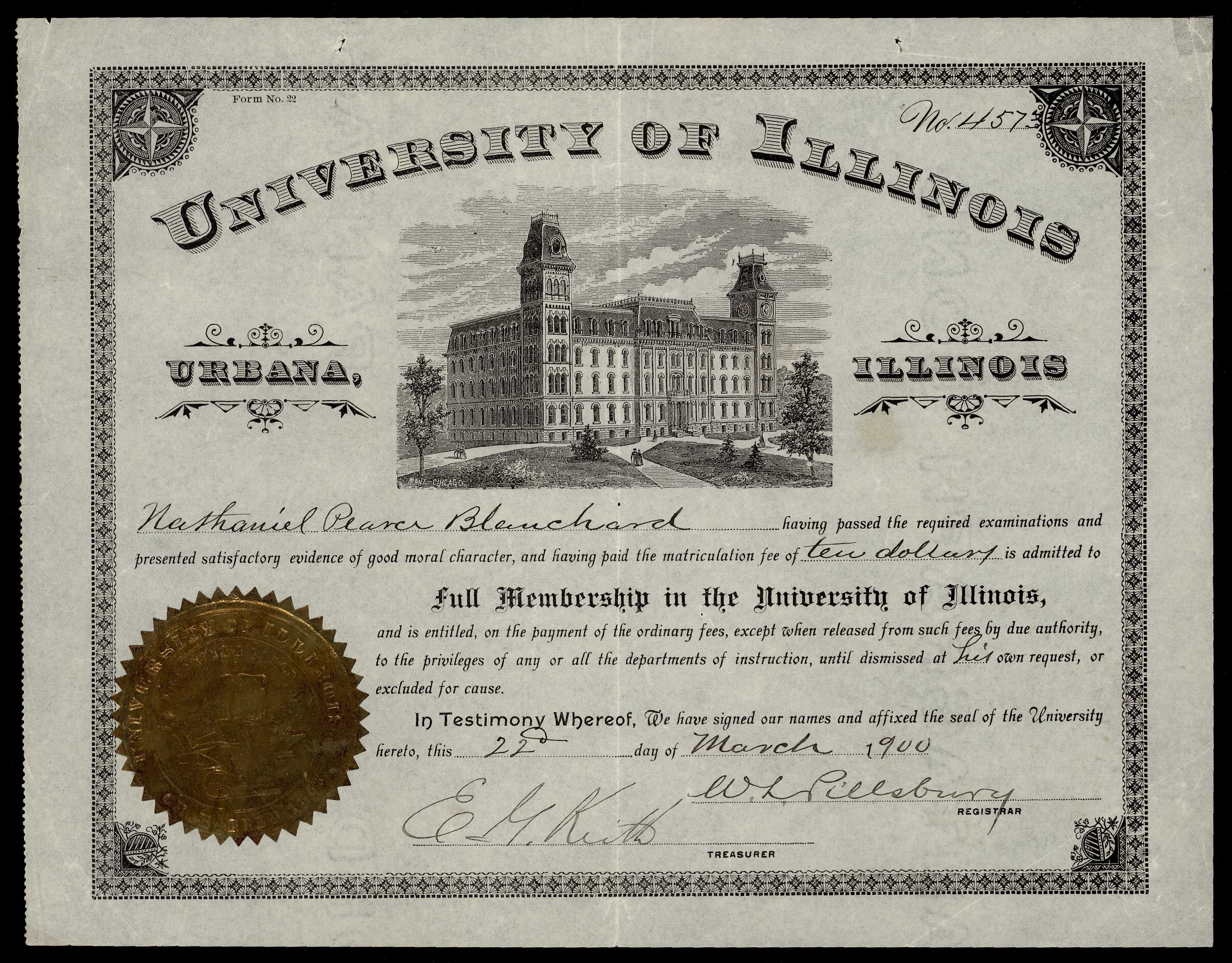
Full Membership certificate of the University of Illinois, issued 22 March 1900

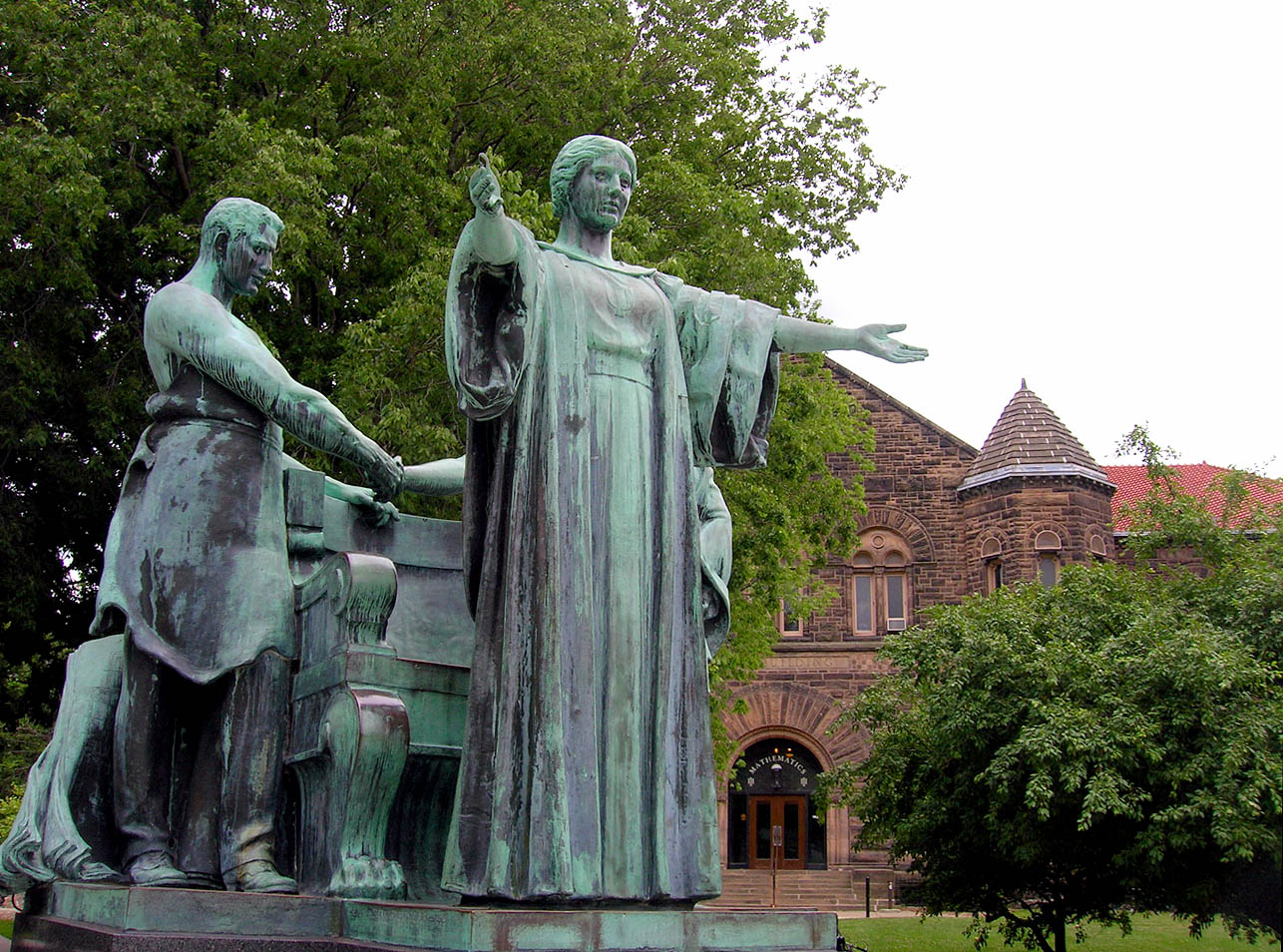
Alma Mater by Lorado Taft, located in front of Altgeld Hall

In 1885, the Illinois Industrial University officially changed its name to the "University of Illinois", reflecting its agricultural, mechanical, and liberal arts curriculum. According to educational historian Roger L. Geiger, Illinois and a few other public and private universities set the standard for what the research university in the United States would become. During his presidency, Edmund J. James (1904–1920) set the policy of building a massive research library. He also laid the foundation for the large Chinese international student population on campus. James established ties with China through the Chinese Minister to the United States Wu Ting-Fang. Also during James's time in 1916, St. Elmo Brady became the first African American nationally to earn a Ph.D. in Chemistry. Class rivalries and Bob Zuppke's winning football teams contributed to campus morale.

Alma Mater, a prominent statue on campus created by alumnus Lorado Taft, was unveiled on June 11, 1929. It was funded from donations by the Alumni Fund and the classes of 1923–1929.

The Great Depression in the United States slowed construction and expansion on the campus. The university replaced the original university hall with Gregory Hall and the Illini Union. After World War II, the university experienced rapid growth. The enrollment doubled and the academic standing improved. This period was also marked by large growth in the Graduate College and increased federal support of scientific and technological research. During the 1950s and 1960s the university experienced the turmoil common on many American campuses. Among these were the water fights of the 1950s and 1960s.

=== University of Illinois Urbana-Champaign (1977–present) ===
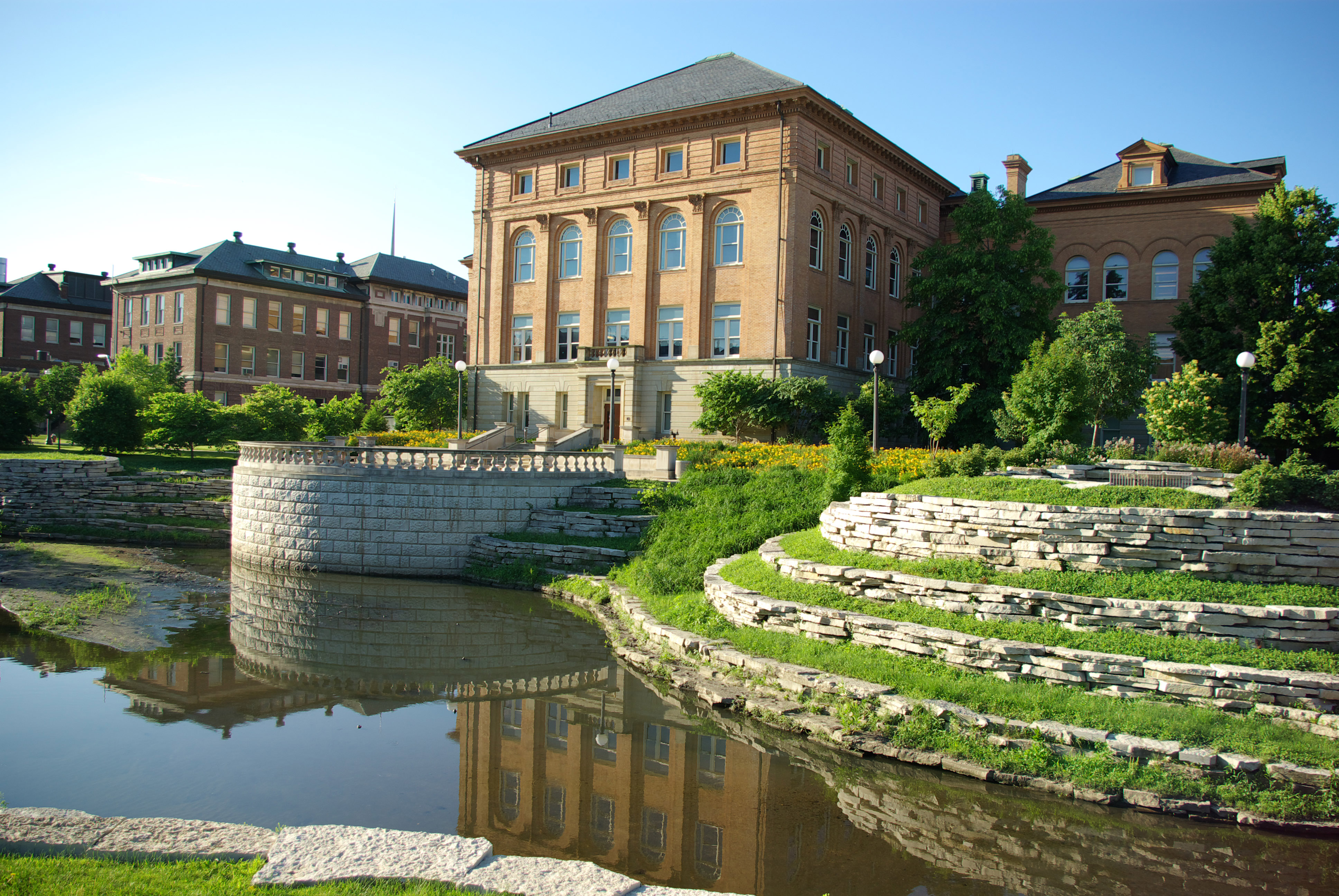
Engineering Hall is located along Boneyard Creek on the Engineering Campus.

By 1967, the University of Illinois system consisted of a main campus in Champaign-Urbana and two Chicago campuses, Chicago Circle (UICC) and Medical Center (UIMC), and people began using "Urbana-Champaign" or the reverse to refer to the main campus specifically. The university name officially changed to the University of Illinois at Urbana-Champaign by 1977 (although the word "at" was later dropped for marketing purposes by all U of I System campuses by 2021). While this was a reversal of the commonly used designation for the metropolitan area (Champaign-Urbana), a majority of the campus is located in Urbana. The name change established a separate identity for the main campus within the University of Illinois System, which today includes separate institutions at the University of Illinois Chicago (formed by the merger of UICC and UIMC) and University of Illinois Springfield.

In 1998, the Hallene Gateway Plaza was dedicated. The Plaza features the original sandstone portal of University Hall, which was originally the fourth building on campus. In recent years, state support has declined from 4.5% of the state's tax appropriations in 1980 to 2.28% in 2011, a nearly 50% decline. As a result, the university's budget has shifted away from relying on state support with nearly 84% of the budget coming from other sources in 2012.

On March 12, 2015, the Board of Trustees approved the creation of a medical school, the first college created at Urbana-Champaign in 60 years. The Carle Illinois College of Medicine began classes in 2018. It is the world's first engineering-based medical school.

== Campus ==
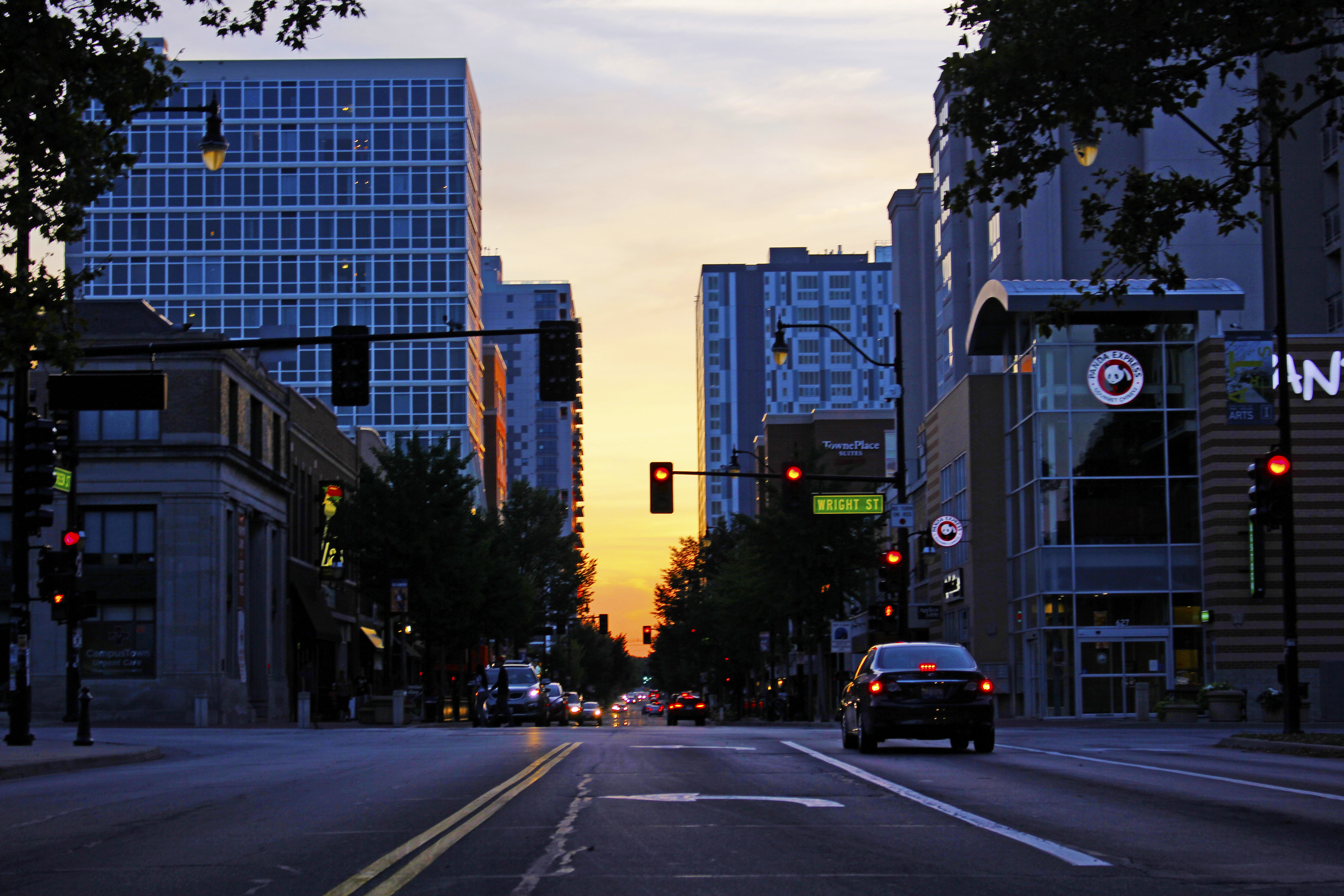
Green Street in Campustown

The main research and academic facilities are divided almost evenly between the twin cities of Urbana and Champaign, which form part of the Champaign–Urbana metropolitan area. Some parts are in Urbana Township.

Four main quads compose the center of the university and are arranged from north to south. The Beckman Quadrangle and the John Bardeen Quadrangle occupy the center of the Engineering Campus. Boneyard Creek flows through the John Bardeen Quadrangle, parallel to Green Street. The Beckman Quadrangle, named after Arnold Orville Beckman, is primarily composed of research units and laboratories, and features a large solar calendar consisting of an obelisk and several copper fountains. The Main Quadrangle and South Quadrangle follow immediately after the John Bardeen Quad. The former makes up a large part of the Liberal Arts and Sciences portion of the campus, while the latter comprises many of the buildings of the College of Agriculture, Consumer, and Environmental Sciences (ACES) spread across the campus map.

Additionally, the research fields of the College of ACES stretch south from Urbana and Champaign into Savoy and Champaign County. The university also maintains formal gardens and a conference center in nearby Monticello at Allerton Park.

The campus is known for its landscape and architecture, as well as distinctive landmarks. It was identified as one of 50 college or university "works of art" by T.A. Gaines in his book The Campus as a Work of Art. The campus also has a number of buildings and sites on the U.S. National Register of Historic Places including Harker Hall, the Astronomical Observatory, Louise Freer Hall, the Main Library, the Experimental Dairy Farm Historic District, and the Morrow Plots. University of Illinois Willard Airport is one of the few airports owned by an educational institution.

Chesterbrook Academy private preschool, which opened in 2007, is located on the campus and serves infants through Pre-K.

Panorama facing north on the Main Quad

=== Sustainability ===
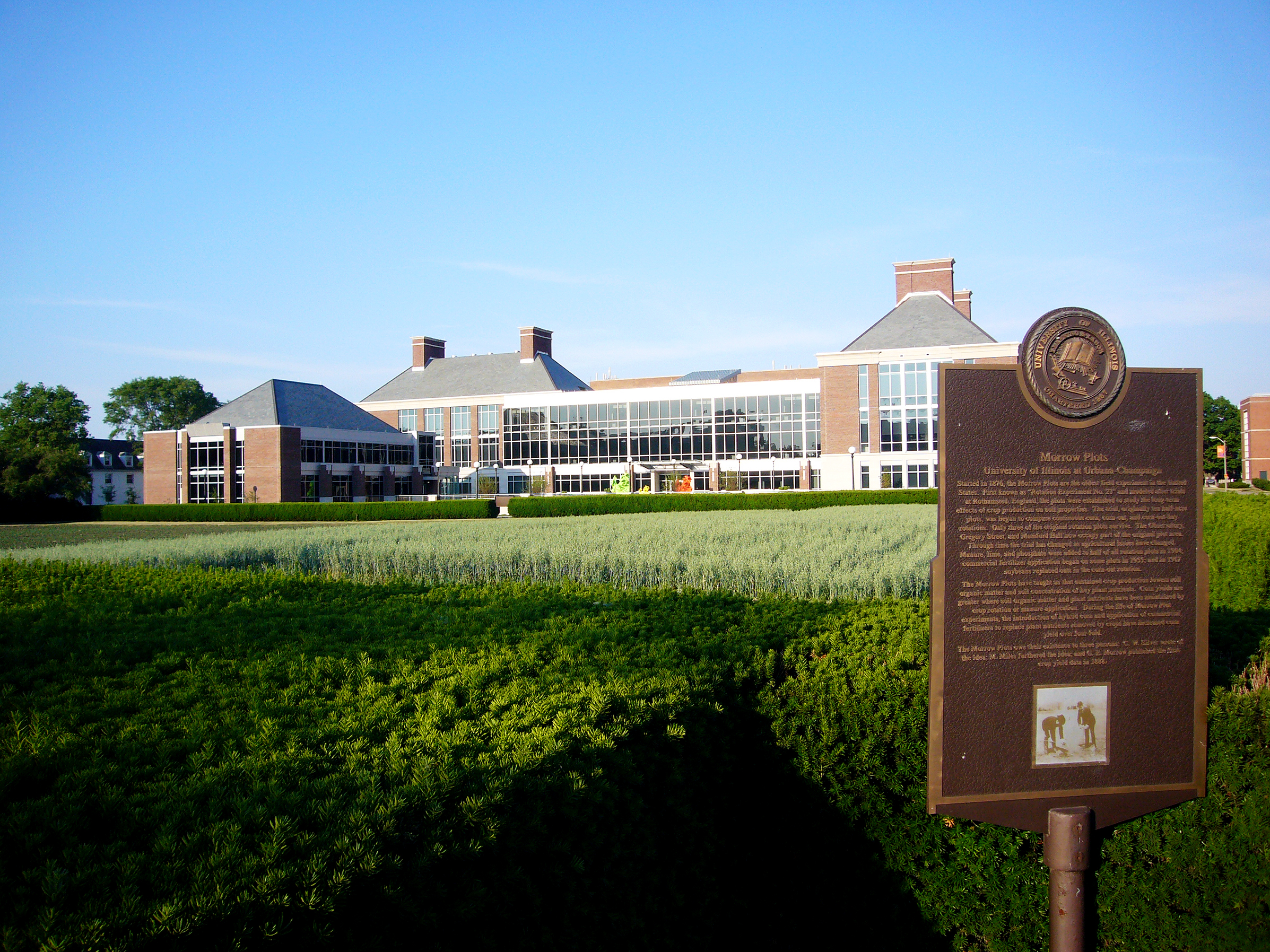
Morrow Plots in front of the Carl R. Woese Institute for Genomic Biology

In 2008, the University of Illinois Urbana-Champaign became a signatory of the American College and University Presidents' Climate Commitment, binding the campus to the goal of carbon neutrality as soon as possible. In 2010, the first Illinois Climate Action Plan (iCAP) was written to chart a path to this goal. The iCAP is a strategic framework for meeting the university's Climate Leadership Commitments to be carbon-neutral by 2050 or sooner and build resilience with its local community. Since then, the iCAP has been rewritten every five years to track the university's progress.

In December 2013, the University of Illinois launched the Institute for Sustainability, Energy, and Environment (iSEE) on the Urbana-Champaign campus. The institute, under the Vice Chancellor for Research and Innovation, leads an interdisciplinary approach to researching solutions for the world's most pressing sustainability, energy, and environmental needs. In addition, iSEE has engaged students, faculty, staff, and campus leadership in the iCAP process — especially in the areas of zero waste and conservation of energy, food, water, land, and natural resources — as well as sustainability outreach and immersive educational programs.

In 2022, new solar and geothermal energy projects, a reduction in water use, and wide-ranging sustainability research helped the University of Illinois Urbana-Champaign earn its fifth consecutive gold certification in the Sustainability Tracking, Assessment & Rating System (STARS). Illinois has consistently achieved gold certification since it began reporting data through STARS in 2013, and the 2022 score was one of its highest to date.

Currently, the campus features 27 LEED-certified buildings.

== Academics ==
As of 2024, 87% of students graduate within 8 years of entering, compared to the national median of 58% for all 4-year universities nationwide.

=== Undergraduate admissions ===
Undergraduate admissions statistics
- 2025 entering class
- Admit rate: 36.6% (▼ −26.7)

Test scores middle 50%^{[i]}
- SAT Total: 1420–1540
- ACT Composite: 31–35

The overall first-year admit rate for 2025 is 36.6%, which differs among U of I colleges. Certain majors can be extremely competitive, such as computer science (where the university's program is consistently ranked fifth nationwide) with an acceptance rate of 7.4% in 2025.

Fall first-time freshman statistics
	2022	2021	2020	2019	2018	2017	2016
Applicants	63,257	47,593	43,473	43,509	39,406	38,965	38,093
Admits	28,354	28,395	27,520	25,684	24,496	23,974	22,881
Admit rate	44.8	59.7	63.3	59.0	62.2	61.5	60.1
Enrolled	7,957	8,303	7,530	7,665	7,609	7,518	7,593
Yield rate	27.4	29.2	27.4	29.8	31.1	31.4	33.2
ACT composite* (out of 36)	30–34 (55.4%^{†})	29–34 (24%^{†})	27–33 (50%^{†})	27–33 (55%^{†})	26–32 (63%^{†})	26–32 (85%^{†})	26–32 (85%^{†})
SAT composite* (out of 1600)	1350–1510 (55.4%^{†})	1340–1510 (43%^{†})	1220–1450 (75%^{†})	1230–1460 (79%^{†})	1220–1480 (63%^{†})	1340–1500 (22%^{†})	—
* middle 50% range^{†} percentage of first-time freshmen who chose to submit

Freshmen admitted in fall 2025
College	ACT composite* (middle 50%, out of 36)	SAT composite* (middle 50%, out of 1600)	Admit rate	Computer science programs
Grainger College of Engineering	33–35	1480–1550	21.2%	Computer science admit rate: 7.4% Computer science + X admit rate: 17.4%
College of Liberal Arts & Sciences	31–35	1420–1530	36.4%	
Gies College of Business	31–34	1430–1520	20.9%	
School of Information Sciences	32–35	1450–1530	48.1%	
School of Social Work	27–33	1200–1400	44.6%	

In 2009, an investigation by The Chicago Tribune reported that some applicants "received special consideration" for acceptance between 2005 and 2009, despite having sub-par qualifications. This incident became known as the University of Illinois clout scandal.

=== Academic divisions ===
University of Illinois Urbana-Champaign
College/school	Year founded
Agriculture, Consumer, and Environmental Sciences	1867
Fine and Applied Arts	1867
Grainger College of Engineering	1868
Information Sciences	1893
Applied Health Sciences	1895
Law	1897
Education	1905
Liberal Arts and Sciences	1913
Gies College of Business	1915
Media	1927
Social Work	1944
Labor and Employment Relations	1946
Veterinary Medicine	1948
Carle Illinois College of Medicine	2015

The university offers more than 150 undergraduate and 100 graduate and professional programs in over 15 academic units, among several online specializations such as Digital Marketing and an online MBA program launched in January 2016. In 2015, the university announced its expansion to include an engineering-based medical program, which would be the first new college created in Urbana-Champaign in 60 years. The university also offers undergraduate students the opportunity for graduation honors. University Honors is an academic distinction awarded to the highest achieving students. To earn the distinction, students must have a cumulative grade point average of a 3.5/4.0 within the academic year of their graduation and rank within the top 3% of their graduating class. Their names are inscribed on a Bronze Tablet that hangs in the Main Library.

=== Online learning ===
In addition to the university's Illinois Online platform, in 2015 the university entered into a partnership with the Silicon Valley educational technology company Coursera to offer a series of master's degrees, certifications, and specialization courses, currently including more than 70 joint learning classes. In August 2015, the Master of Business Administration program was launched through the platform. On March 31, 2016, Coursera announced the launch of the Master of Computer Science in Data Science from the University of Illinois Urbana-Champaign. At the time, the university's computer-science graduate program was ranked fifth in the United States by U.S. News & World Report. On March 29, 2017, the University of Illinois Urbana-Champaign launched their Master's in Accounting (iMSA) program, now called the Master of Science in Accountancy (iMSA) program. The iMSA program is led through live sessions, headed by Illinois faculty.

Similar to the university's on-campus admission policies, the online master's degrees offered by the U of I through Coursera also has admission requirements. All applicants must hold a bachelor's degree, and have earned a 3.0 GPA or higher in the last two years of study. Additionally, all applicants must prove their proficiency in English.

The U of I also offers online courses in partnership with Coursera, such as Marketing in a Digital World, which focuses on how digital tools like internet, smartphone and 3D printers are changing the marketing landscape.

=== Reputation and rankings ===
Academic rankings

National
- Forbes: 32
- U.S. News & World Report: 33 (tie)
- Washington Monthly: 19
- WSJ/College Pulse: 47

Global
- ARWU: 46
- QS: 70
- THE: 41
- U.S. News & World Report: 98 (tie)

National program rankings
Program	Ranking
Audiology	18
Biological Sciences	32
Chemistry	9
Clinical Psychology	14
Computer Science	5
Earth Sciences	30
Economics	32
Education	31
Engineering	7
English	21
Fine Arts	53
History	25
Law	48
Library and Information Studies	1
Mathematics	20
Physics	9
Political Science	27
Psychology	8
Public Health	55
Social Work	24
Sociology	42
Speech-Language Pathology	14
Statistics	22
Veterinary Medicine	18

Global subject rankings
Program	Ranking
Agricultural Sciences	20
Arts and Humanities	31
Biology and Biochemistry	35
Biotechnology & Applied Microbiology	30
Cell Biology	119
Chemical Engineering	178
Chemistry	47
Civil Engineering	70
Clinical Medicine	328
Computer Science	13
Economics and Business	63
Electrical & Electronic Engineering	5
Energy & Fuels	75
Engineering	38
Environment/Ecology	96
Geosciences	99
Materials Science	4
Mathematics	54
Mechanical Engineering	42
Microbiology	87
Molecular Biology & Genetics	101
Nanoscience & Nanotechnology	81
Neuroscience & Behavior	186
Physics	22
Plant & Animal Science	31
Psychiatry/Psychology	54
Public, Environmental & Occupational Health	177
Social Sciences & Public Health	82
Space Science	20

In the 2021 U.S. News & World Report "America's Best Colleges" report, Illinois's undergraduate program was ranked tied for 47th among national universities and tied for 15th among public universities, with its undergraduate engineering program ranked tied for 6th in the U.S. among schools whose highest degree is a doctorate.

Washington Monthly ranked Illinois 18th among 389 national universities in the U.S. for 2020, based on its contribution to the public good as measured by social mobility, research, and promoting public service. Kiplinger's Personal Finance rated Illinois 12th in its 2019 list of 174 Best Values in Public Colleges, which "measures academic quality, cost and financial aid."

The Graduate Program in Urban Planning at the College of Fine and Applied Arts was ranked 3rd nationally by Planetizen in 2015. The university was also listed as a "Public Ivy" in The Public Ivies: America's Flagship Public Universities (2001) by Howard and Matthew Greene. The Princeton Review ranked Illinois 1st in its 2016 list of top party schools.

Internationally, Illinois engineering was ranked 13th in the world in 2016 by the Academic Ranking of World Universities (ARWU) and the university 38th in 2019; the university was also ranked 48th globally by the Times Higher Education World University Rankings in 2020 and 75th in the world by the QS World University Rankings for 2020. The Center for World University Rankings (CWUR) has ranked University of Illinois Urbana-Champaign as the 20th best university in the world for 2019–20.

Illinois ranked 32nd in the world in Times Higher Education World Reputation Rankings for 2018.

== Philanthropy ==
Notable among significant donors, alumnus entrepreneur Thomas M. Siebel has committed nearly $150 million to the university, including $36 million to build the Thomas M. Siebel Center for Computer Science, $25 million to build the Siebel Center for Design, and $50 million to support the renamed Department of Computer Science to become Siebel School of Computing and Data Science. Furthermore, the Grainger Foundation (founded by alumnus W. W. Grainger) has contributed more than $300 million to the university over the last half-century, including donations for the construction of the Grainger Engineering Library. Larry Gies and his wife Beth donated $150 million in 2017 to the shortly thereafter renamed Gies College of Business.

== Research ==
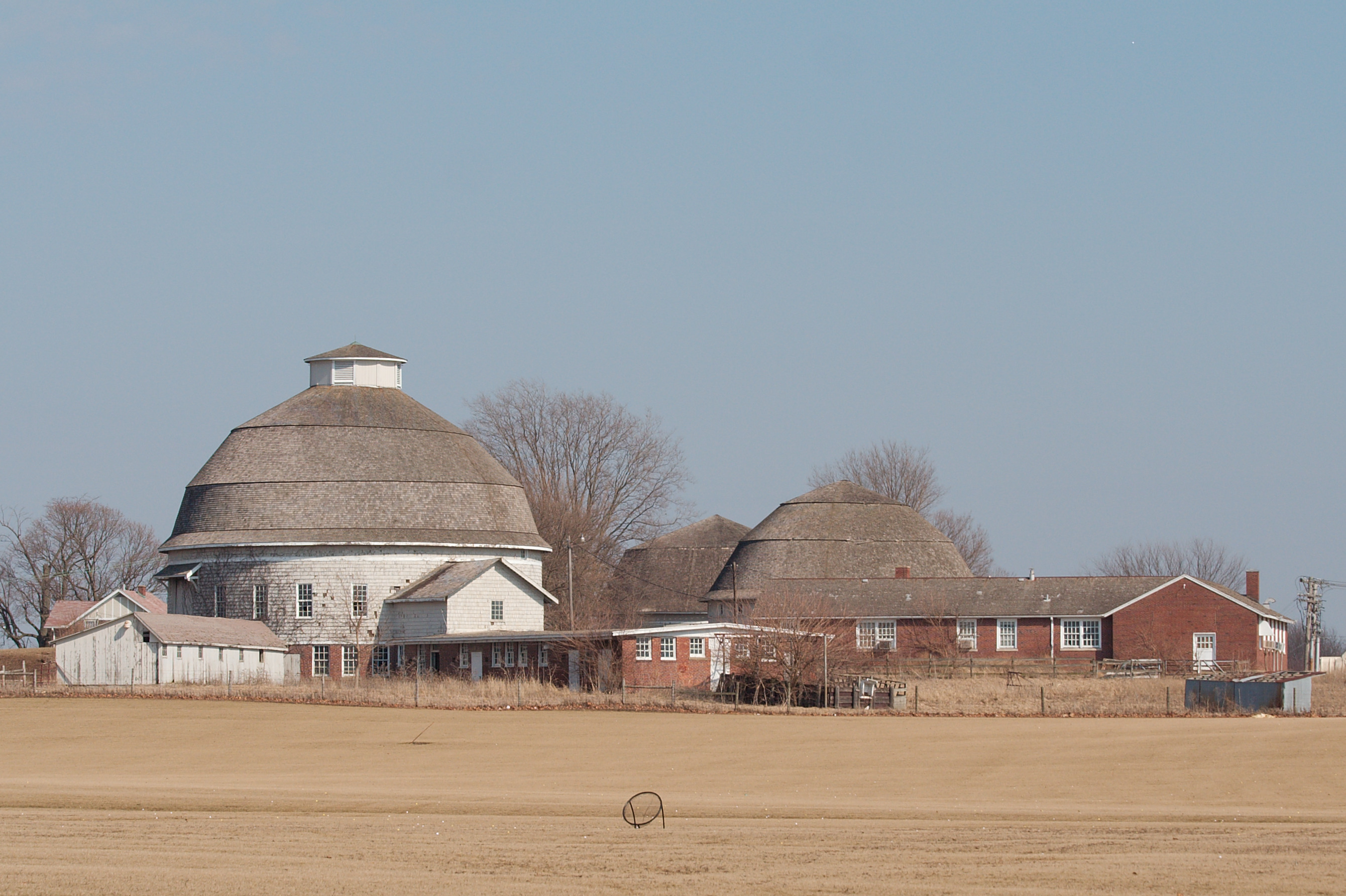
Round barns on the University of Illinois Experimental Dairy Farm Historic District, part of ACES

The University of Illinois Urbana-Champaign is often regarded as a world-leading magnet for engineering and sciences (both applied and basic). According to the National Science Foundation, the university spent $625 million on research and development in 2018, ranking it 37th in the nation. It is also listed as one of the top 25 American research universities by The Center for Measuring University Performance.

Besides the annual influx of grants and sponsored projects, the university manages an extensive modern research infrastructure. The university has been a leader in computer-based education and hosted the PLATO project, which was a precursor to the internet and resulted in the development of the plasma display. Illinois was a 2nd-generation ARPAnet site in 1971 and was the first institution to license the UNIX operating system from Bell Labs. In Bill Gates' 2004 talk as part of his five-university campus tour titled "Software Breakthroughs: Solving the Toughest Problems in Computer Science," he mentioned that Microsoft hired more graduates from the University of Illinois Urbana-Champaign than from any other university in the world.

=== Centers and institutes ===
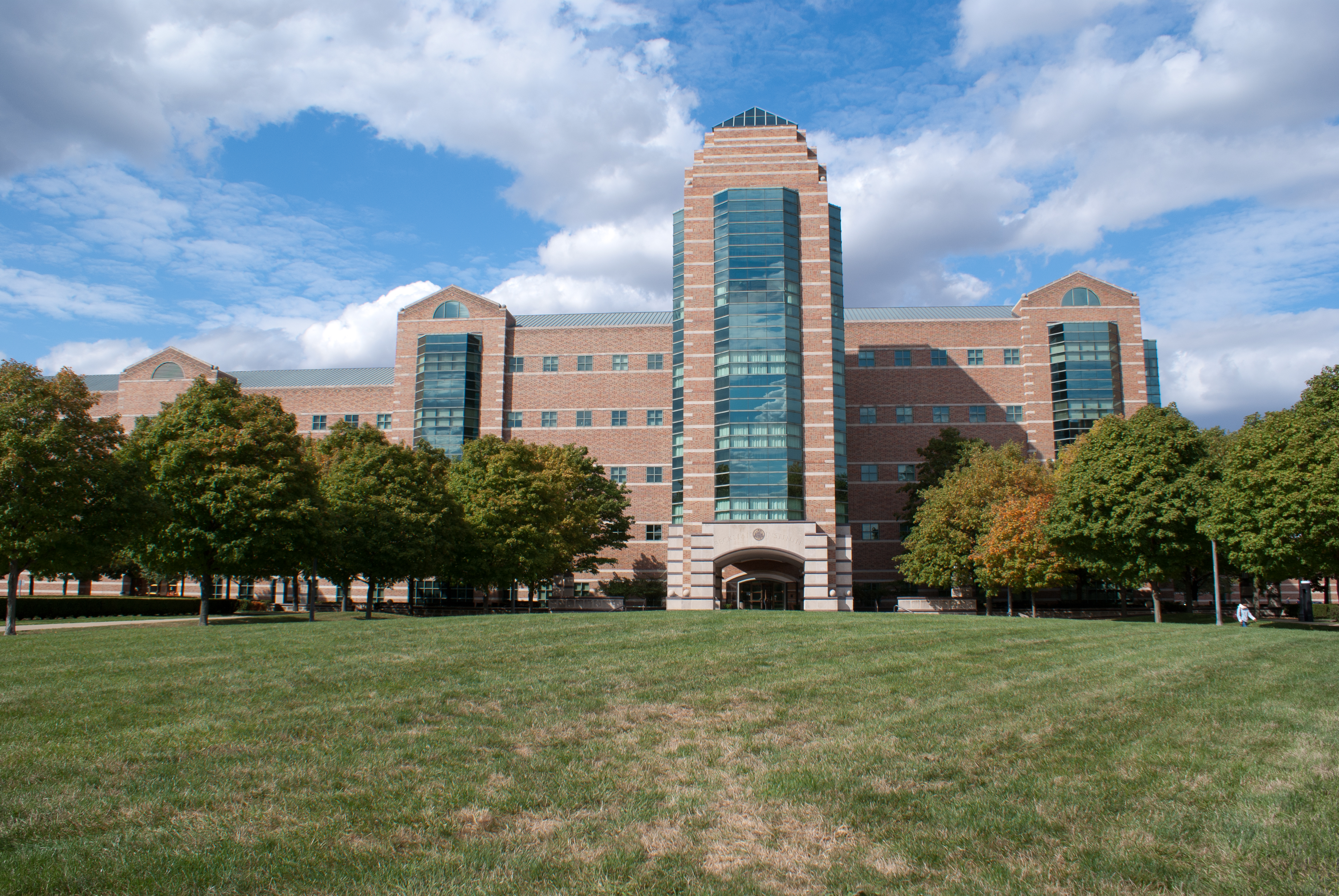
The Beckman Institute for Advanced Science and Technology is the largest interdisciplinary facility on campus, at 313,000 square feet (29,100 m^{2}).

The university hosts the National Center for Supercomputing Applications (NCSA), which created Mosaic, the first graphical web browser, the Apache HTTP server, and NCSA Telnet. The Parallel@Illinois program hosts several programs in parallel computing, including the Universal Parallel Computing Research Center. The university contracted with Cray to build the National Science Foundation-funded supercomputer Blue Waters. The system also has the largest public online storage system in the world with more than 25 petabytes of usable space. The university celebrated January 12, 1997, as the "birthday" of HAL 9000, the fictional supercomputer from the novel and film 2001: A Space Odyssey; in both works, HAL credits "Urbana, Illinois" as his place of operational origin.

The Beckman Institute for Advanced Science and Technology supports interdisciplinary collaborative research in the broad areas of intelligent systems, neuroscience, molecular science and engineering, and biomedical imaging.

The Carl R. Woese Institute for Genomic Biology supports research in genomics and related areas of biology.

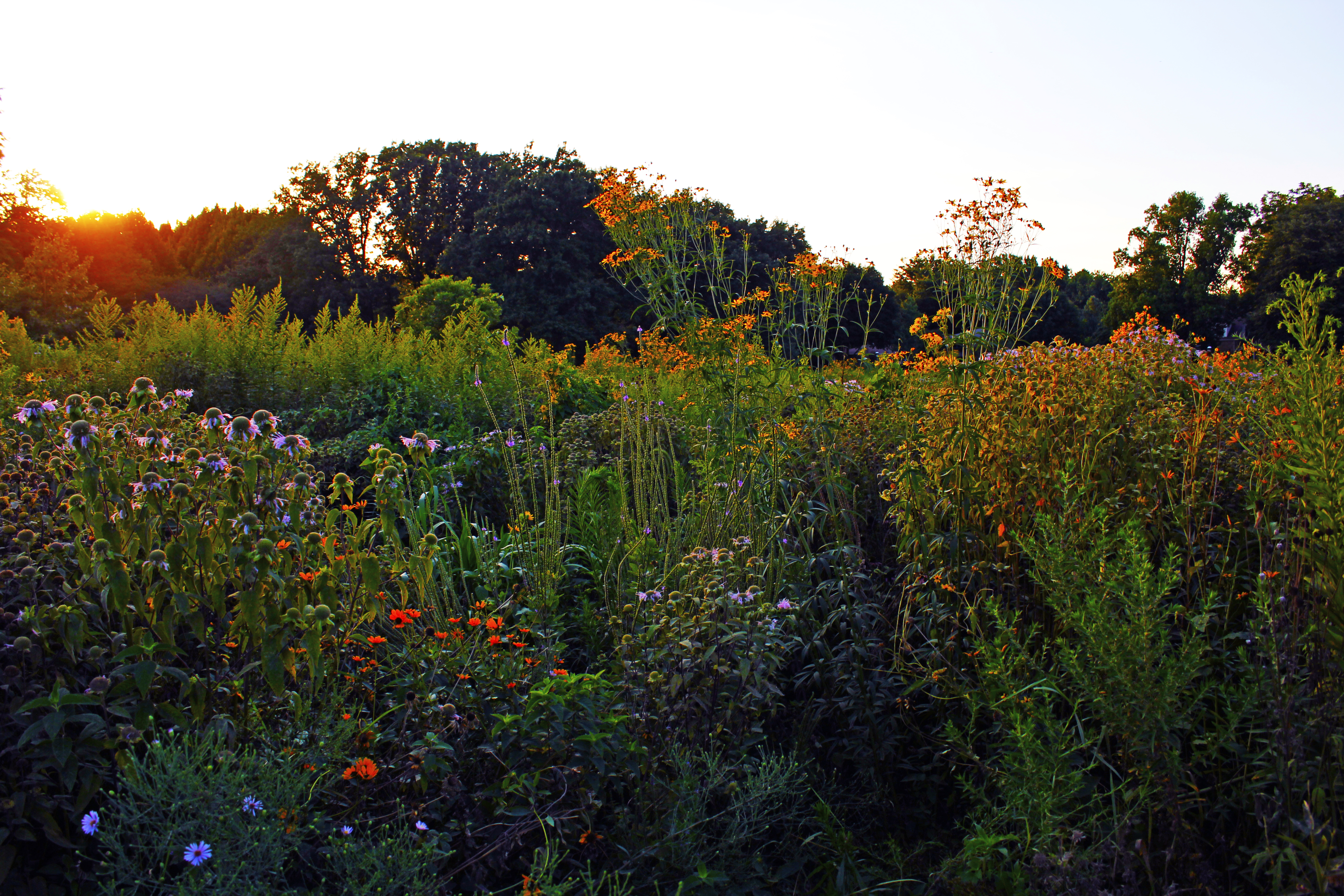
One of the university's research prairie fields, located off Florida Avenue

The Prairie Research Institute on campus houses several divisions, including the Illinois Natural History Survey, Illinois State Geological Survey, Illinois State Water Survey, Illinois Sustainable Technology Center, and Illinois State Archaeological Survey. Researchers focus on areas such as agriculture, biodiversity, climate, public health, emerging pests, energy, mineral resources, pollution mitigation, and water resources. The Illinois Natural History Survey holds extensive collections, including one of North America's largest insect collections. The Illinois State Geological Survey manages the Illinois Geological Samples Library and paleontological collections. The Illinois State Archaeological Survey preserves a large collection of Illinois archaeological artifacts, including those from the Cahokia Mounds.

The Technology Entrepreneur Center at the University of Illinois Urbana-Champaign offers resources for students to develop their entrepreneurial ideas, including classes, competitions, and workshops. It hosts events including the Cozad New Venture Challenge, Silicon Valley Entrepreneurship Workshop, Illinois I-Corps, and SocialFuse. The Cozad Challenge, held annually since 2000, provides mentorship and workshops on venture creation, with teams competing for funding. The Silicon Valley Workshop, a week-long event in January, exposes students to startups, technology companies, and entrepreneurial alumni in Silicon Valley. Illinois I-Corps helps National Science Foundation grantees identify valuable product opportunities from academic research through customer discovery and entrepreneurship training. SocialFuse is a pitching and networking event where students can present ideas and connect with potential teammates.

The Center for Plasma-Material Interactions was established in 2004 by David Ruzic to research the complex behavior between ions, electrons, and energetic atoms generated in plasmas and the surfaces of materials. CPMI encompasses fusion plasmas in its research.

In 2007, the university-hosted research Institute for Condensed Matter Theory (ICMT) was launched, with the director Paul Goldbart and the chief scientist Anthony Leggett. ICMT is located at the Engineering Science Building on campus.

=== Research Park ===
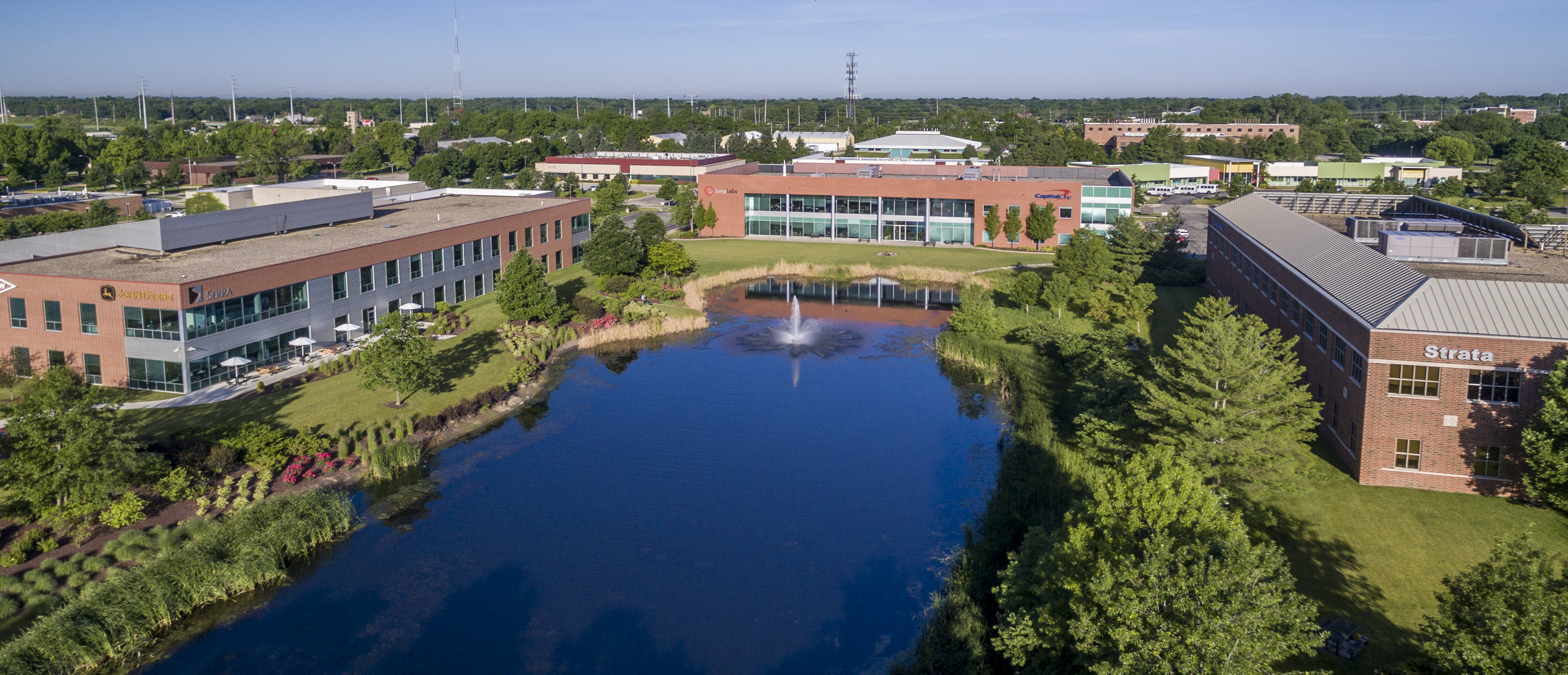
Research Park at the University of Illinois Urbana-Champaign

Located in the southwest part of campus, Research Park opened its first building in 2001 and has grown to encompass 13 buildings. Ninety companies have established roots in research park, employing over 1,400 people. Tenants of the Research Park facilities include prominent Fortune 500 companies Capital One, John Deere, State Farm, Caterpillar, and Yahoo, Inc. Companies also employ about 400 total student interns at any given time throughout the year. The complex is also a center for entrepreneurs, and has over 50 startup companies stationed at its EnterpriseWorks Incubator facility.

In 2011, Urbana, Illinois, was named number 11 on Popular Mechanics' "14 Best Startup Cities in America" list, in a large part due to the contributions of Research Park's programs. The park has gained recognition from other notable publications, such as inc.com and Forbes magazine. For the 2011 fiscal year, Research Park produced an economic output of $169.5M for the state of Illinois.

=== Notable discoveries and innovations ===
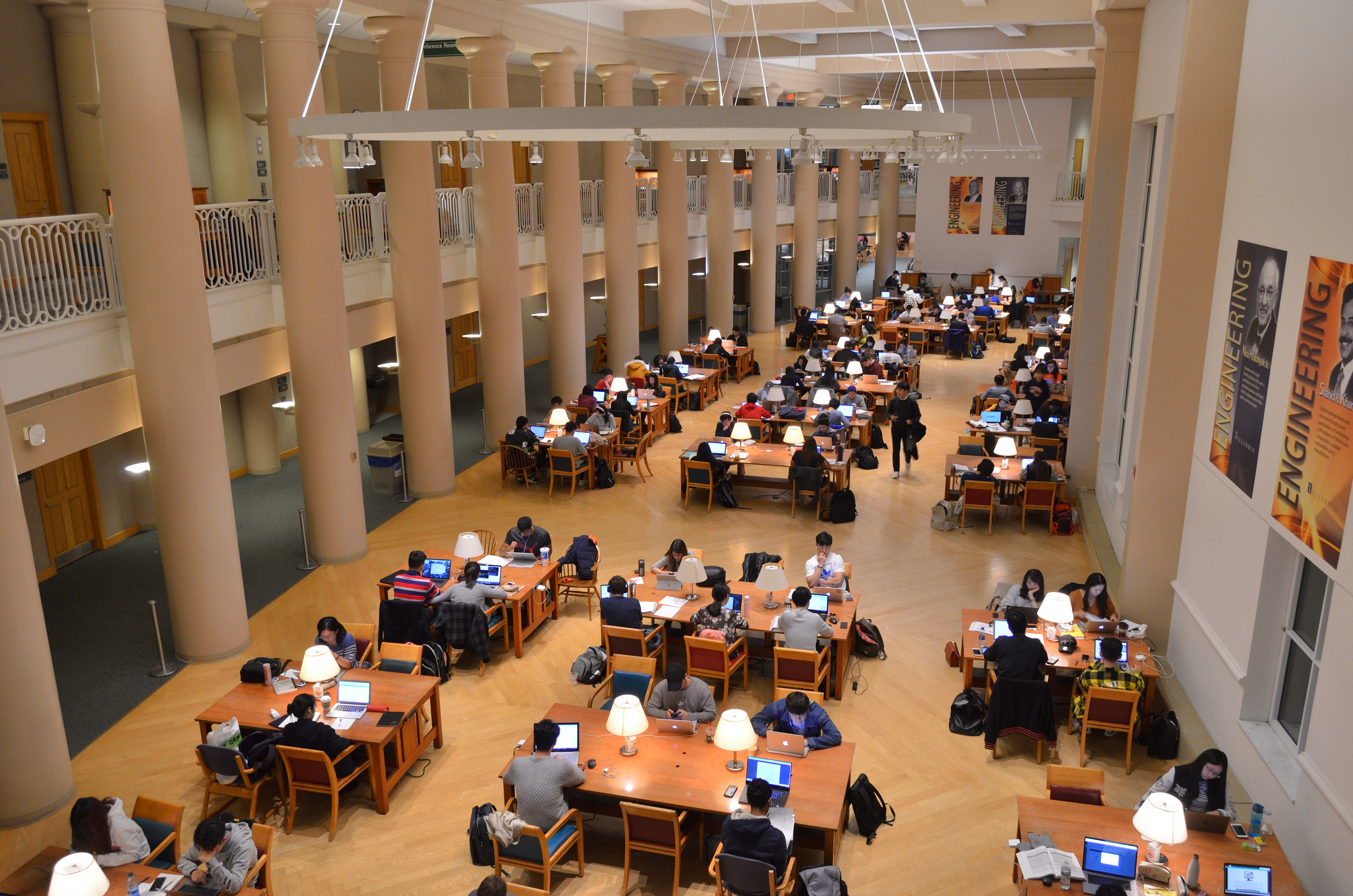
Grainger Engineering Library

In the field of natural sciences, the BCS theory, a groundbreaking theory of superconductivity, was proposed by John Bardeen in collaboration with Leon Cooper and his doctoral student John Robert Schrieffer. Their work earned them the Nobel Prize in Physics in 1972. In the realm of agricultural science, John Laughnan, while a professor, developed sweet corn with higher-than-normal sugar content, a significant advancement in crop science.

In computer and applied sciences, several notable achievements originated from the University of Illinois. The ILLIAC I, built in 1952, was the first computer entirely constructed and owned by a U.S. educational institution. It was also used by Lejaren Hiller and Leonard Issacson to create the Illiac Suite, the first known composition written by an electronic computer. The development of LLVM, initially started by Vikram Adve and Chris Lattner, is now recognized as a major project in compiler infrastructure. Another milestone was the development of the Mosaic web browser at the National Center for Supercomputing Applications in 1993.

NAMD, a molecular dynamics simulation code, was pioneered by Klaus Schulten and his team at the Beckman Institute for Advanced Science and Technology, further advancing computational biophysics. The PLATO system, also developed at the University of Illinois, was the first generalized computer assisted instruction system, which by the late 1970s supported thousands of terminals globally, introducing many concepts foundational to modern multi-user computing such as forums, instant messaging, and online testing. In terms of interface technologies, Donald Bitzer was instrumental in the 1960s development of both touchscreens and plasma displays. Furthermore, Doug Brown and David R. Woolley created Talkomatic in 1973 on the PLATO system, an early online chat system enabling real-time text communication among small groups.

In the realm of audio-visual technology, Joseph Tykociński-Tykociner publicly demonstrated for the first time a motion picture with a soundtrack optically recorded directly onto the film in 1922.

== Student life ==
Student body composition as of September 2024
Race and ethnicity	Total
White	39%
Asian	22%
Hispanic	14%
Foreign national	14%
Black	6%
Other (Note: Other consists of multiracial Americans and those who prefer to not say.)	5%
Economic diversity
Low-income (Note: The percentage of students who received an income-based federal Pell grant intended for low-income students.)	26%
Affluent (Note: The percentage of students who are a part of the American middle class at the bare minimum.)	74%

=== Student body ===
As of spring 2018, the university had 45,813 students. As of 2015, over 10,000 students were international students, and of them 5,295 were Mainland Chinese. The university also recruits students from over 100 countries among its 32,878 undergraduate students and 10,245 graduate and professional students. The gender breakdown is 55% men, 45% women. Illinois in 2014 enrolled 4,898 students from China, more than any other American university. They comprise the largest group of international students on the campus, followed by South Korea (1,268 in fall 2014) and India (1,167). Graduate enrollment of Chinese students at Illinois has grown from 649 in 2000 to 1,973 in 2014.

=== Student organizations ===
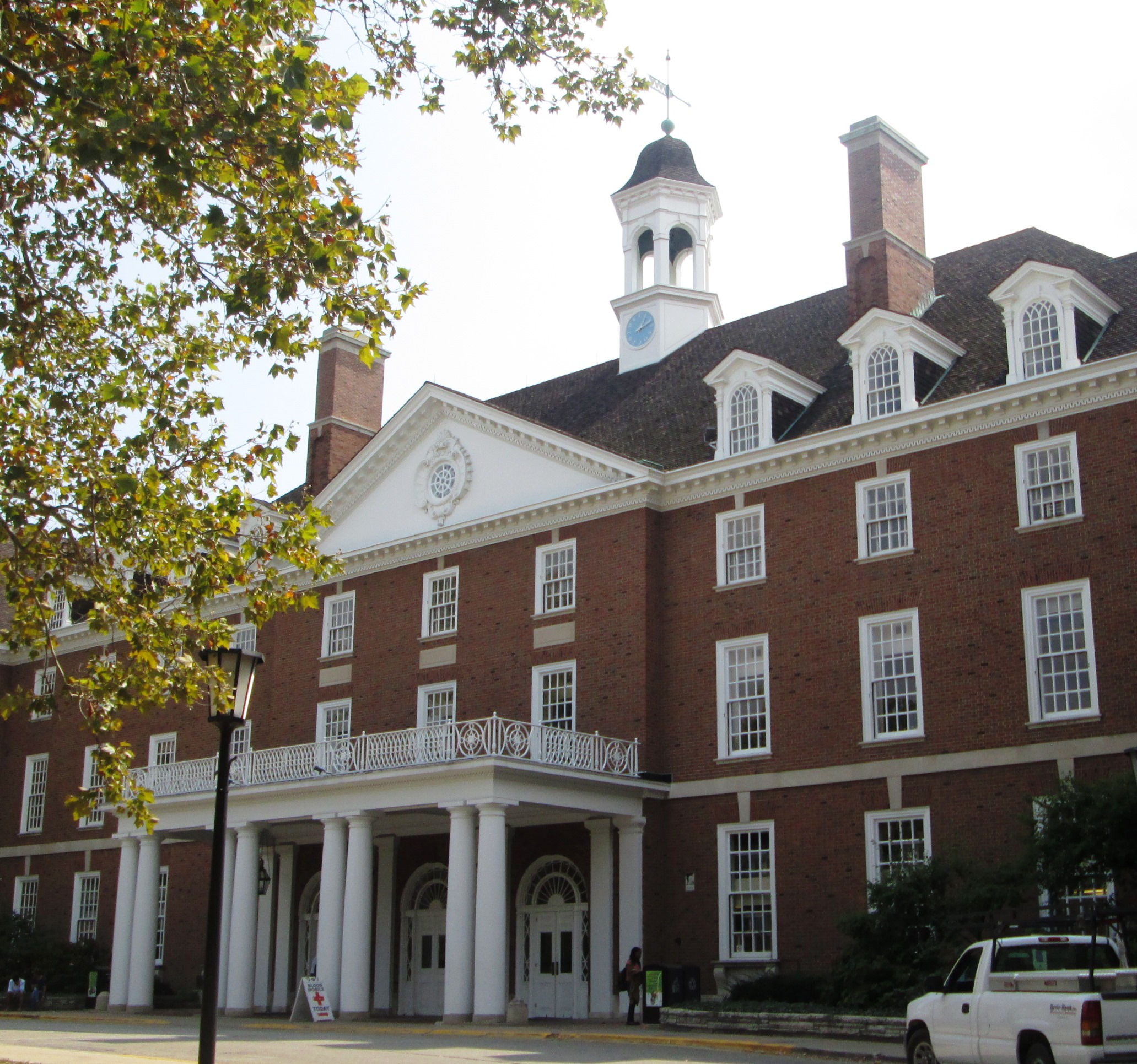
Illini Union

The university has over 1,000 active registered student organizations, showcased at the start of each academic year during Illinois's "Quad Day." Registration and support is provided by the Student Programs & Activities Office, an administrative arm established in pursuit of the larger social, intellectual, and educative goals of the Illini Student Union. The office's mission is to "enhance ... classroom education," "meet the needs and desires of the campus community," and "prepare students to be contributing and humane citizens."

The Daily Illini is a student-run newspaper that has been published for the community of since 1871. The paper is published by Illini Media Company, a not-for-profit which also prints other publications, and operates WPGU 107.1 FM, a student-run commercial radio station.

The Varsity Men's Glee Club is an all-male choir at Illinois that was founded in 1886. It is one of the oldest glee clubs in the United States, as well as the oldest registered student organization at the U of I. As of 2018, the university also had the largest chapter of Alpha Phi Omega, with over 340 active members.

==== Greek life ====
There are 59 fraternities and 38 sororities on campus. Of the approximately 30,366 undergraduates, 3,463 are members of sororities and 3,674 are members of fraternities. The Greek system at the University of Illinois Urbana-Champaign has a system of self-government. While staff advisors and directors manage certain aspects of the Greek community, most of the day-to-day operations of the Greek community are governed by the Interfraternity Council and Panhellenic Council. A smaller minority of fraternities and sororities fall under the jurisdiction of the Black Greek Council and United Greek Council; the Black Greek Council serves historically black Greek organizations while the United Greek council comprises other multicultural organizations. Many of the fraternity and sorority houses on campus are on the National Register of Historic Places.

==== Student government ====
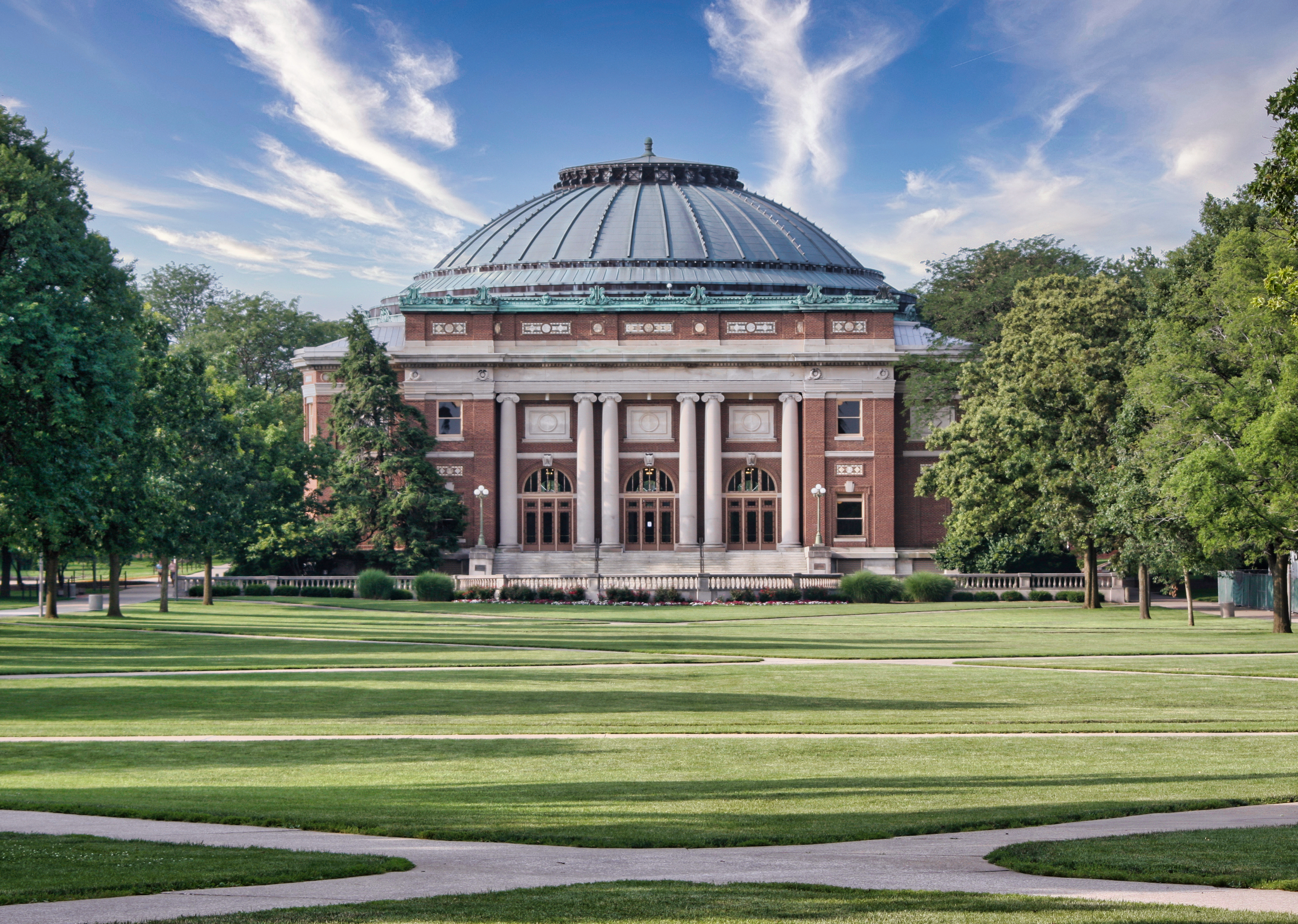
Foellinger Auditorium

U of I has an extensive history of past student governments. Two years after the university opened in 1868, John Milton Gregory and a group of students created a constitution for a student government. Their governance expanded to the entire university in 1873, having a legislative, executive, and judicial branch. For a period of time, this government had the ability to discipline students. In 1883, however, due to a combination of events from Gregory's resignation to student-faculty infighting, the government formally dissolved itself via plebiscite.

It was not until 1934, when the Student Senate, the next university-wide student government, was created. A year before, future Illinois Dean of Students, Fred H. Turner and the university's Senate Committee on Student Affairs gave increased power to the Student Council, an organization primarily known for organizing dances. A year after, the Student Council created a constitution and became the Student Senate, under the oversight of the Committee on Student Affairs. This Student Senate would last for 35 years. The Student Senate changed its purpose and name in 1969, when it became the Undergraduate Student Association (UGSA). It ceased being a representational government, becoming a collective bargaining agency instead. It often worked with the Graduate Student Association to work on various projects

In 1967, Bruce A. Morrison and other U of I graduate founded the Graduate Student Association (GSA). GSA would last until 1978, when it merged with the UGSA to form the Champaign-Urbana Student Association (CUSA). CUSA lasted for only two years when it was replaced by the Student Government Association (SGA) in 1980. SGA lasted for 15 years until it became the Illinois Student Government (ISG) in 1995. ISG lasted until 2004.

The current university student government, created in 2004, is the Illinois Student Senate, a combined undergraduate and graduate student senate with 54 voting members. The student senators are elected by college and represent the students in the Urbana-Champaign Senate (which comprises both faculty and students), as well as on a variety of faculty and administrative committees, and are led by an internally elected executive board of a president, external vice president, internal vice president, and treasurer. As of 2012, the executive board is supported by an executive staff consisting of a chief of staff, clerk of the Senate, parliamentarian, director of communications, Intern Coordinator, and the historian of the Senate.

=== Residence halls ===
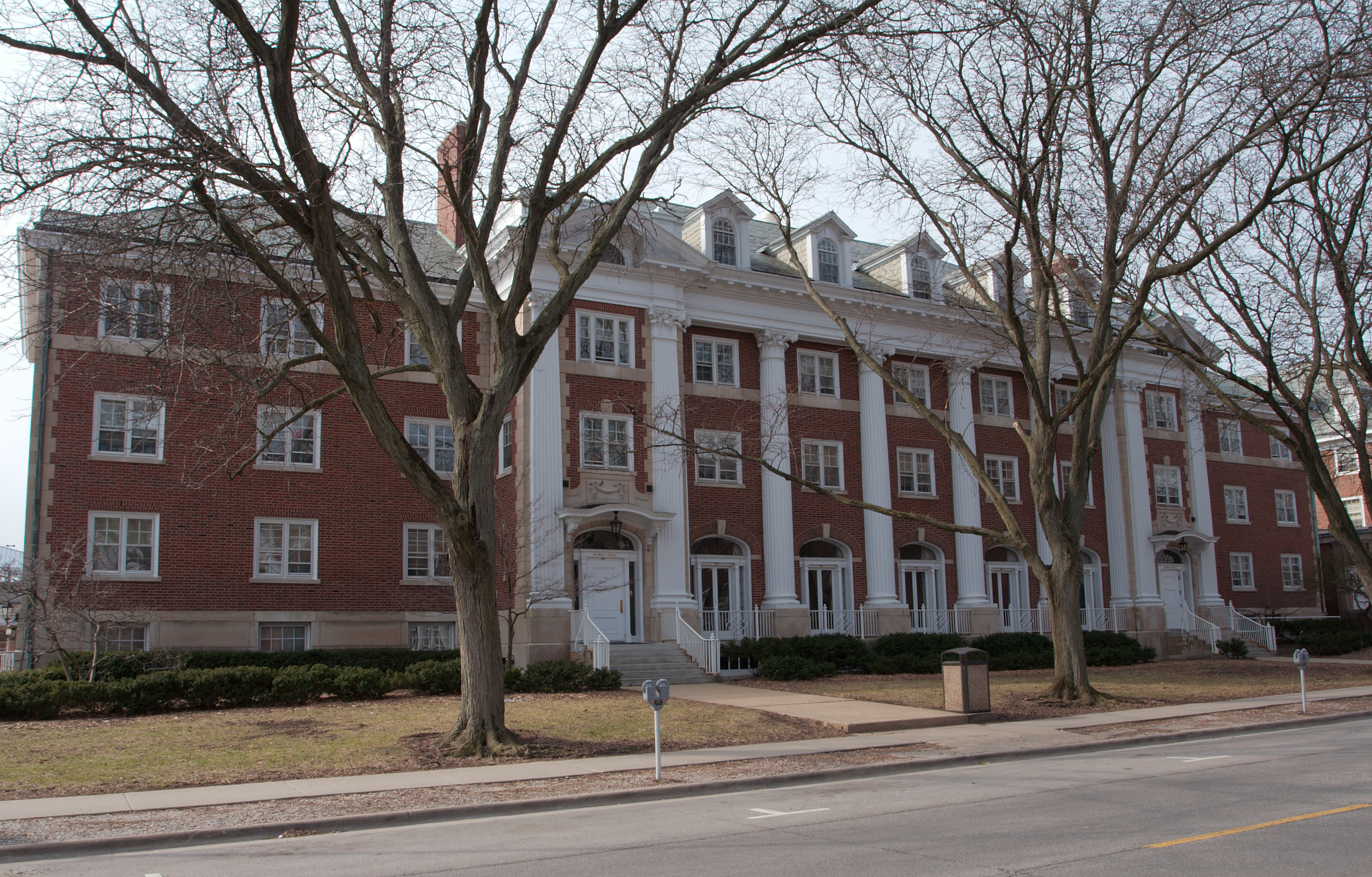
Busey-Evans Residence Halls is one of many buildings on the NRHP.

The university provides housing for undergraduates through 24 residence halls in Urbana and Champaign. Incoming freshmen are required to live in student housing (campus or certified) their first year on campus. The university also maintains two graduate residence halls, which are restricted to students who are sophomores or above, and three university-owned apartment complexes. Some undergraduates choose to move into apartments or the Greek houses after their first year. There are a number of private dormitories around campus, as well as 15 private, certified residences that partner with the university to offer a variety of different housing options, including ones that are cooperatives, single-gender or religiously affiliated. U of I is known for being one of the first universities to provide accommodations for students with disabilities. In 2015, the University of Illinois announced that they would be naming its newest residence hall after Carlos Montezuma, also known as Wassaja. He is the first Native American graduate, and is believed to be one of the first Native Americans to receive a medical degree.

=== Libraries and museums ===
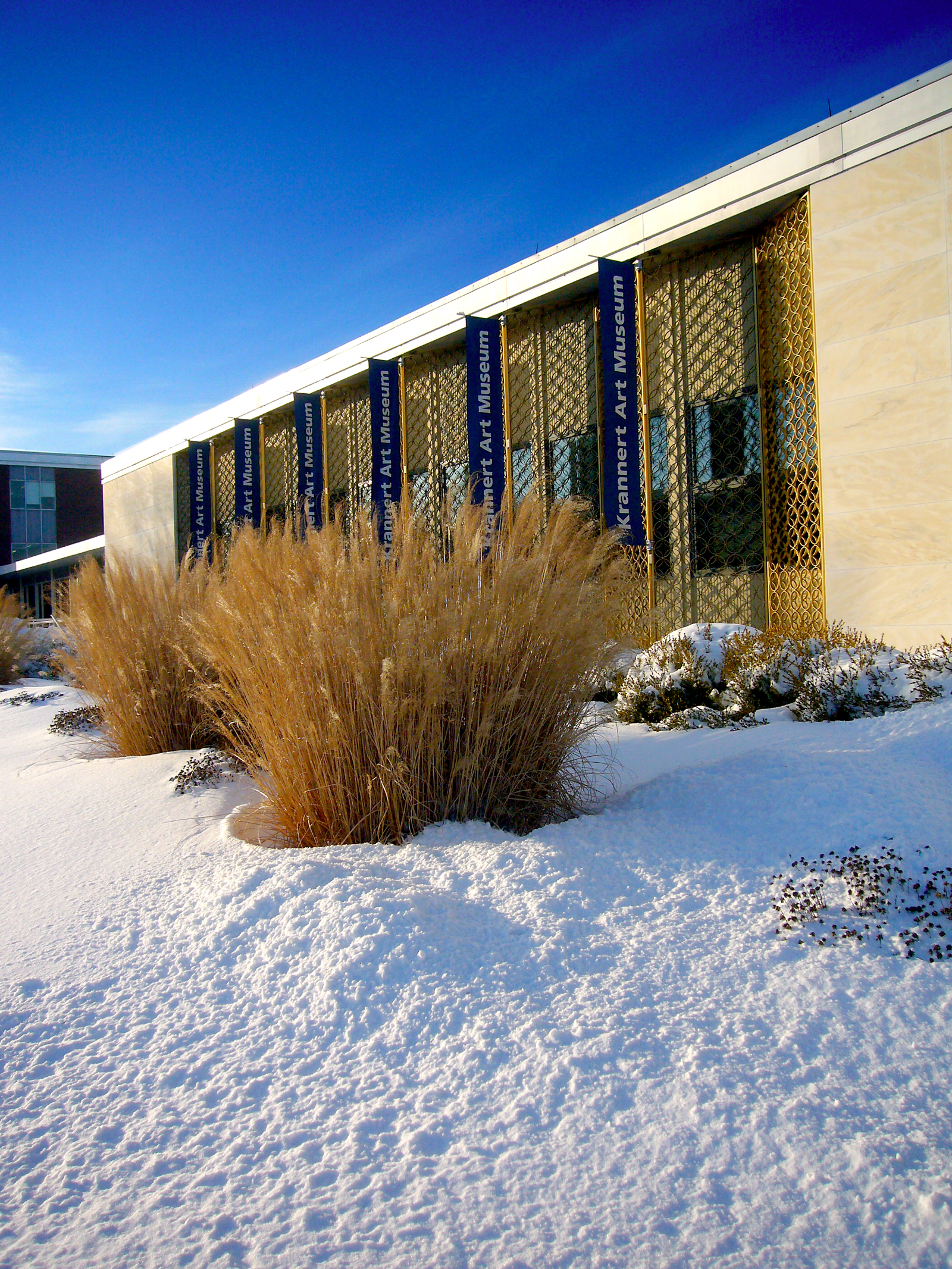
Krannert Art Museum

Among universities in North America, only the collections of Harvard are larger. Currently, the University of Illinois Urbana-Champaign's 20+ departmental libraries and divisions hold more than 24 million items, including more than 12 million print volumes. As of 2012, it had also the largest "browsable" university library in the United States, with 5 million volumes directly accessible in stacks in a single location. The university also has the largest public engineering library (Grainger Engineering Library) in the country. In addition to the main library building, which houses numerous subject-oriented libraries, the Isaac Funk Family Library on the South Quad serves the College of Agriculture, Consumer, and Environmental Sciences and the Grainger Engineering Library Information Center serves the College of Engineering on the John Bardeen Quad.

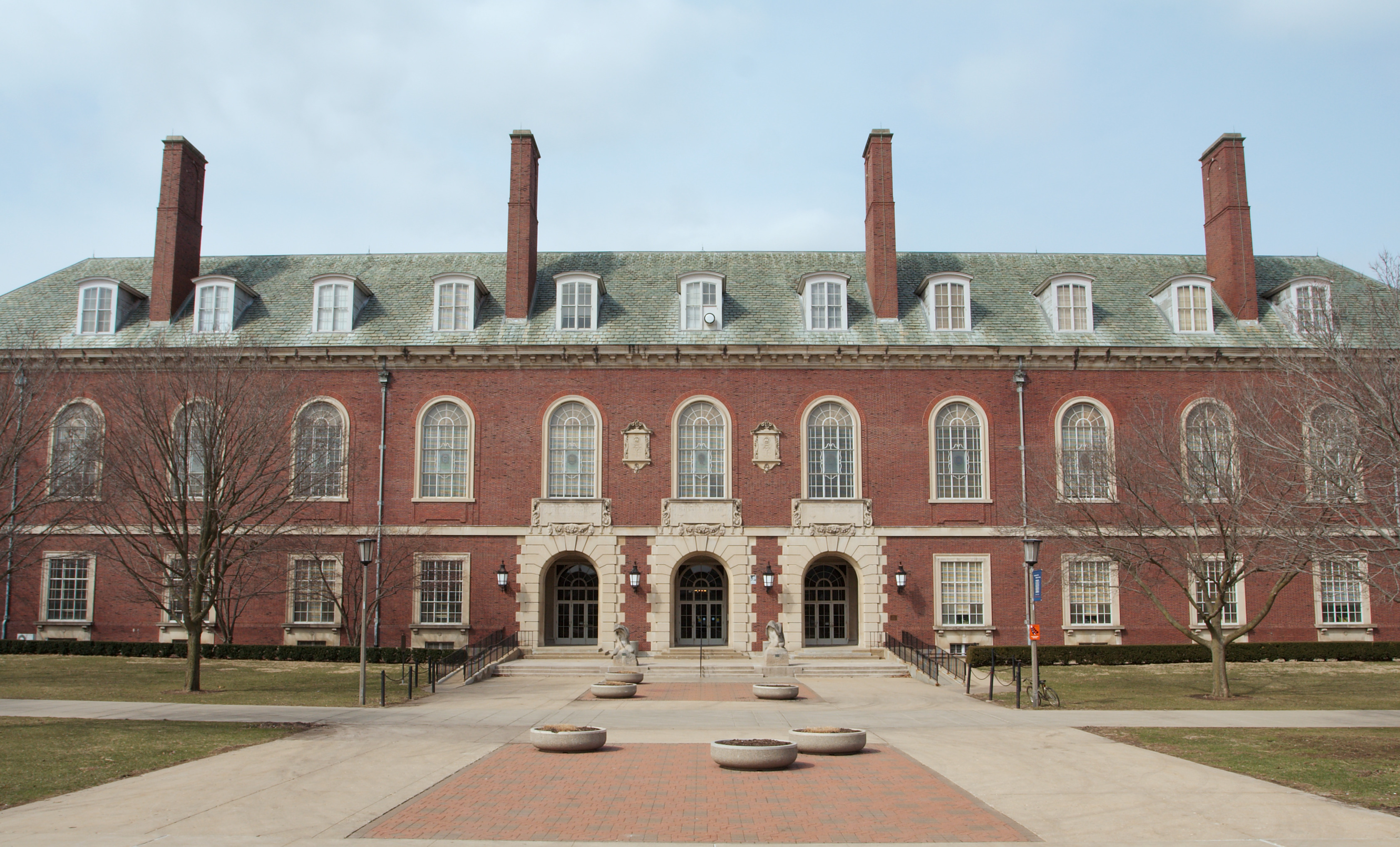
The Main Library, which includes the Rare Book & Manuscript Library

Residence Hall Library System is one of three in the nation. The Residence Hall Libraries were created in 1948 to serve the educational, recreational, and cultural information needs of first- and second-year undergraduate students residing in the residence halls, and the living-learning communities within the residence halls. The collection also serves University Housing staff as well as the larger campus community. The Rare Book & Manuscript Library (RBML) is one of the Special collections units within the University Library. The RBML is one of the largest special collections repositories in the United States.

The university has several museums, galleries, and archives which include Krannert Art Museum, Sousa Archives and Center for American Music and Spurlock Museum. Gallery and exhibit locations include Krannert Center for the Performing Arts and at the School of Art and Design.

The Illinois Open Publishing Network (IOPN) is hosted and coordinated by the University of Illinois Urbana-Champaign Library, offering publishing services to members of the University of Illinois Urbana-Champaign community, to disseminate open access scholarly publications.

=== Recreation ===
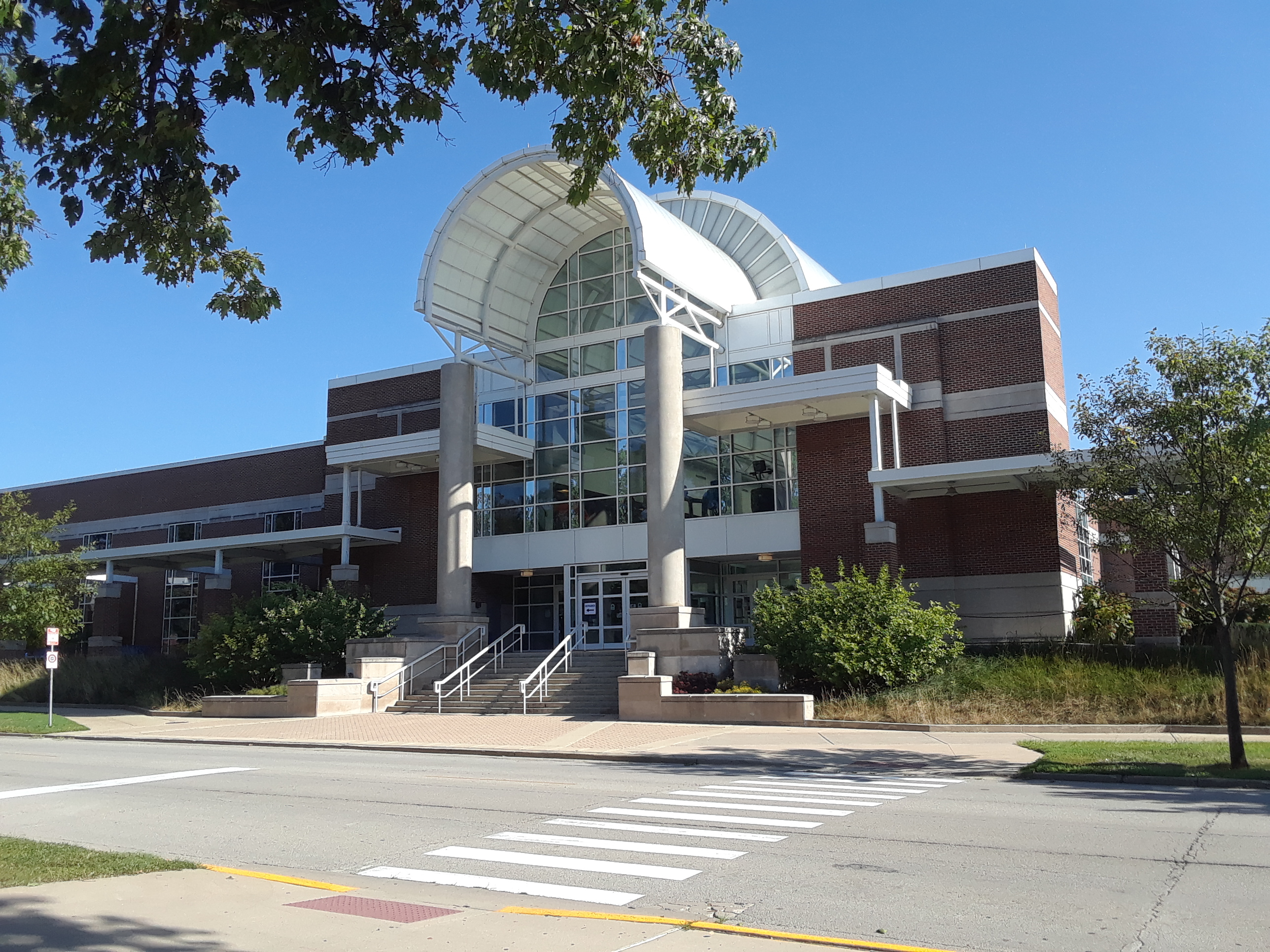
Activities and Recreation Center

The campus has two main recreation facilities, the Activities and Recreation Center (ARC) and the Campus Recreation Center – East (CRCE). Originally known as the Intramural Physical Education Building (IMPE) and opened in 1971, IMPE was renovated in 2006 and reopened in August 2008 as the ARC. The renovations expanded the facility, adding 103,433 square feet to the existing structure and costing $54.9 million. This facility is touted by the university as "one of the country's largest on-campus recreation centers." CRCE was originally known as the Satellite Recreation Center and was opened in 1989. The facility was renovated in 2005 to expand the space and update equipment, officially reopening in March 2005 as CRCE.

=== Transportation ===
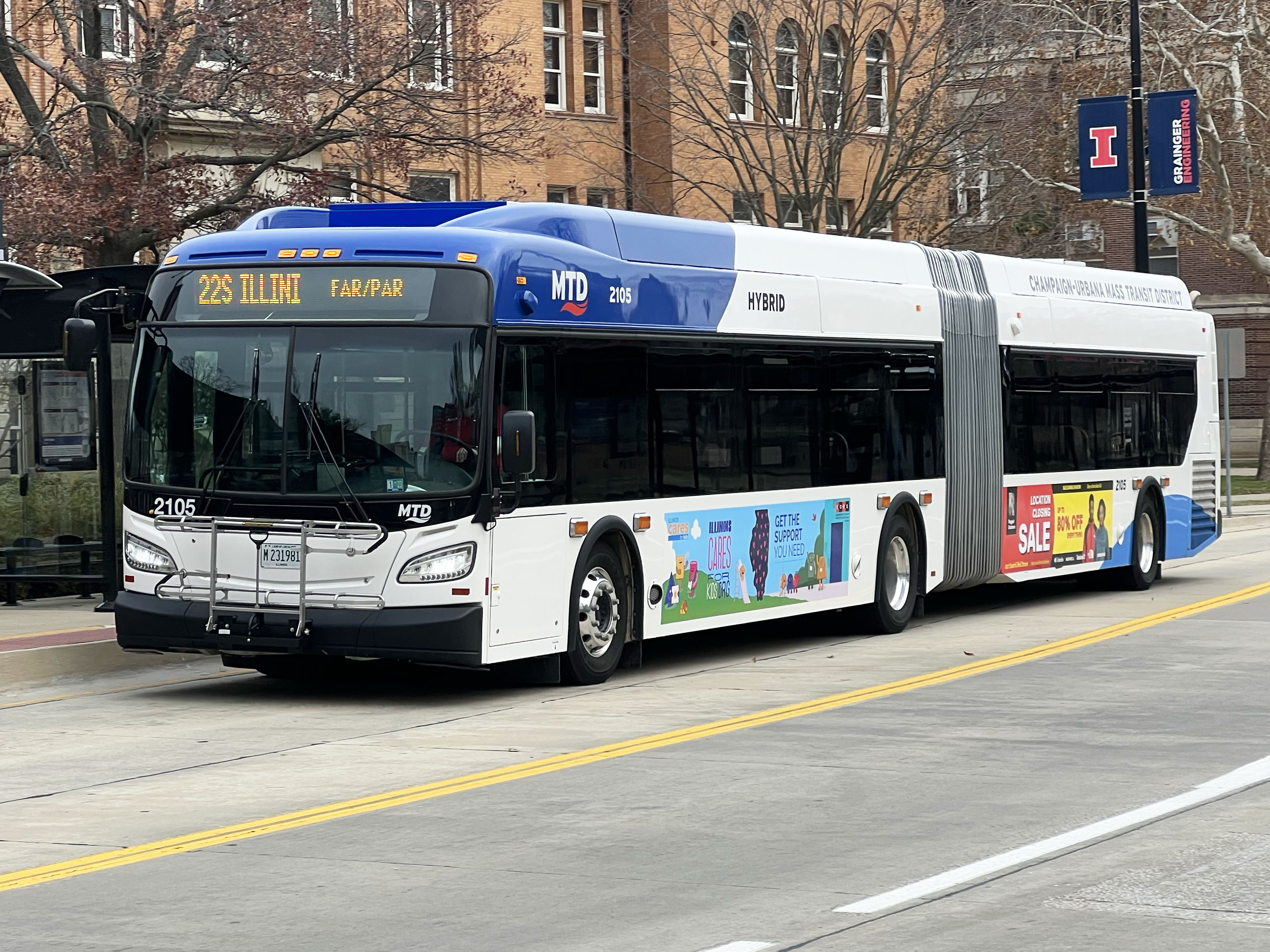
A Champaign–Urbana Mass Transit District (MTD) bus

The bus system that operates throughout the campus and community is operated by the Champaign-Urbana Mass Transit District. The MTD receives a student-approved transportation fee from the university, which provides unlimited access for university students, faculty, and staff.

Daily Amtrak trains through Illinois Terminal connect Champaign-Urbana with Chicago and Carbondale, Illinois. This includes the corridor service Illini and Saluki and the long-distance City of New Orleans, which provides a direct route to Memphis, Tennessee; Jackson, Mississippi; and New Orleans, Louisiana southbound, in addition to Chicago northbound.

Willard Airport, opened in 1954 and is named for former University of Illinois president Arthur Cutts Willard. The airport is located in Savoy. Willard Airport is home to university research projects, along with flights from American Airlines. In 2013, the university's Institute of Aviation was closed at the University of Illinois and the program was transferred to Parkland College.

Campus bus routes

=== Security ===
The University of Illinois Urbana-Champaign has a dedicated police department, UIPD, which operates independently from CPD, the department that serves the surrounding Champaign area.

On June 9, 2017, Yingying Zhang, a Chinese international student, was abducted and murdered in a case that made national headlines at the time. The university subsequently announced plans to install additional, high-definition, security cameras across the campus.

In July 2022, the university announced that it was partnering with local businesses to invest $300,000 to combat violent crime in Champaign County.

In September 2022, the City of Champaign transferred responsibility for a large swath of Campustown from CPD (Champaign Police Department) to UIPD, claiming that doing so would reduce response times and improve the quality of service. As part of the jurisdictional reforms, the city agreed to pay a substantial portion of the cost to hire seven new officers to patrol the new coverage area.

Violent crime fell sharply in 2022 compared to the year prior, with shootings and homicides declining by 50 and 47 percent, respectively. The city attributed the decrease in crime to improved staffing levels and the installation of automatic license plate readers.

== Athletics ==
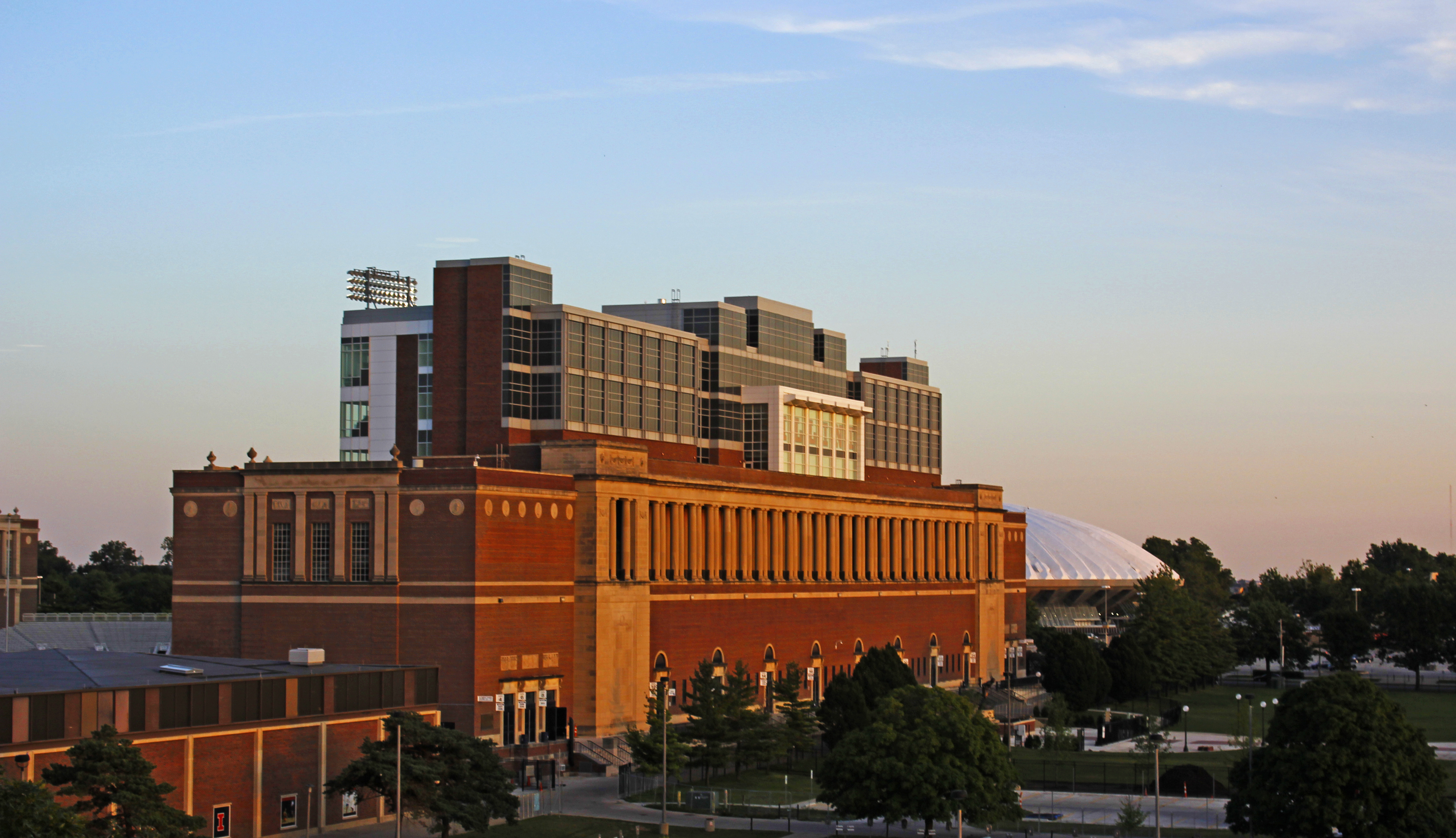
Memorial Stadium with the State Farm Center in the background

The Illinois Division of Intercollegiate Athletics fields teams for ten men's and eleven women's varsity sports. The university participates in the NCAA's Division I. The university's athletic teams are known as the Fighting Illini. The university operates a number of athletic facilities, including Memorial Stadium for football, the State Farm Center for men's and women's basketball, and the Atkins Tennis Center for men's and women's tennis. The men's NCAA basketball team had a dream run in the 2005 season, with Bruce Weber's Fighting Illini tying the record for most victories in a season. Their run ended 37–2 with a loss to the North Carolina Tar Heels in the national championship game. Illinois is a member of the Big Ten Conference. Notable among a number of songs commonly played and sung at various events such as commencement and convocation, and athletic games are: Illinois Loyalty, the school song; Oskee Wow Wow, the fight song; and Hail to the Orange, the alma mater.

On October 15, 1910, the Illinois football team defeated the University of Chicago Maroons with a score of 3–0 in a game that Illinois claims was the first homecoming game, though several other schools claim to have held the first homecoming as well. On November 10, 2007, the unranked Illinois football team defeated the No. 1 ranked Ohio State football team in Ohio Stadium, the first time that the Illini beat a No. 1 ranked team on the road.

The University of Illinois Ice Arena is home to the university's club college ice hockey team competing at the ACHA Division I level and is also available for recreational use through the Division of Campus Recreation. It was built in 1931 and designed by Chicago architecture firm Holabird and Root, the same firm that designed the University of Illinois Urbana-Champaign's Memorial Stadium and Chicago's Soldier Field. It is located on Armory Drive across from the Armory. The structure features four rows of bleacher seating in an elevated balcony that runs the length of the ice rink on either side. These bleachers provide seating for roughly 1,200 fans, with standing room and bench seating available underneath. Because of this set-up the team benches are actually directly underneath the stands.

In 2015, the university began Mandarin Chinese broadcasts of its American football games as a service to its Chinese international students.

The university's division of Disability Resources and Educational Services fields wheelchair basketball and wheelchair track teams. Illinois was the first college in the United States to establish a wheelchair basketball team (in 1948) and a women's wheelchair basketball team (in 1970), and both the men's and women's teams are members of the intercollegiate divisions of the National Wheelchair Basketball Association. The university is one of ten official training sites for the United States Olympic & Paralympic Committee, specializing in para-athletics. The wheelchair programs have been highly successful, producing several Paralympic medalists.

=== Mascot ===
The Fighting Illini athletics logo since 2014

The U of I currently has no mascot. Chief Illiniwek, also referred to as "The Chief", was from 1926 to 2007 the official symbol of the U of I in university intercollegiate athletic programs. The Chief was typically portrayed by a student dressed in Sioux regalia. Several groups protested that the use of a Native American figure and indigenous customs in such a manner was inappropriate and promoted ethnic stereotypes. In August 2005, the National Collegiate Athletic Association expressed disapproval of the university's use of a "hostile or abusive" image. While initially proposing a consensus approach to the decision about the Chief, the board in 2007 decided that the Chief, its name, image and regalia should be officially retired. Nevertheless, the controversy continues on campus with some students unofficially maintaining the Chief. Complaints continue that indigenous students feel insulted when images of the Chief continue to be present on campus. The effort to resolve the controversy has included the work of a committee, which issued a report of its "critical conversations" that included over 600 participants representing all sides.

There is a grassroots campaign of students and alumni to officially recognize the belted kingfisher as the mascot of the U of I. Female belted kingfishers are orange and blue (the school's colors) and the bird is native to Illinois. A Kingfisher costume has been created and has made appearances on campus. The campaign to adopt the mascot is not seeking to change the name "Fighting Illini." Multiple Indigenous organizations have also expressed support for the Kingfisher.

== Notable alumni and faculty ==
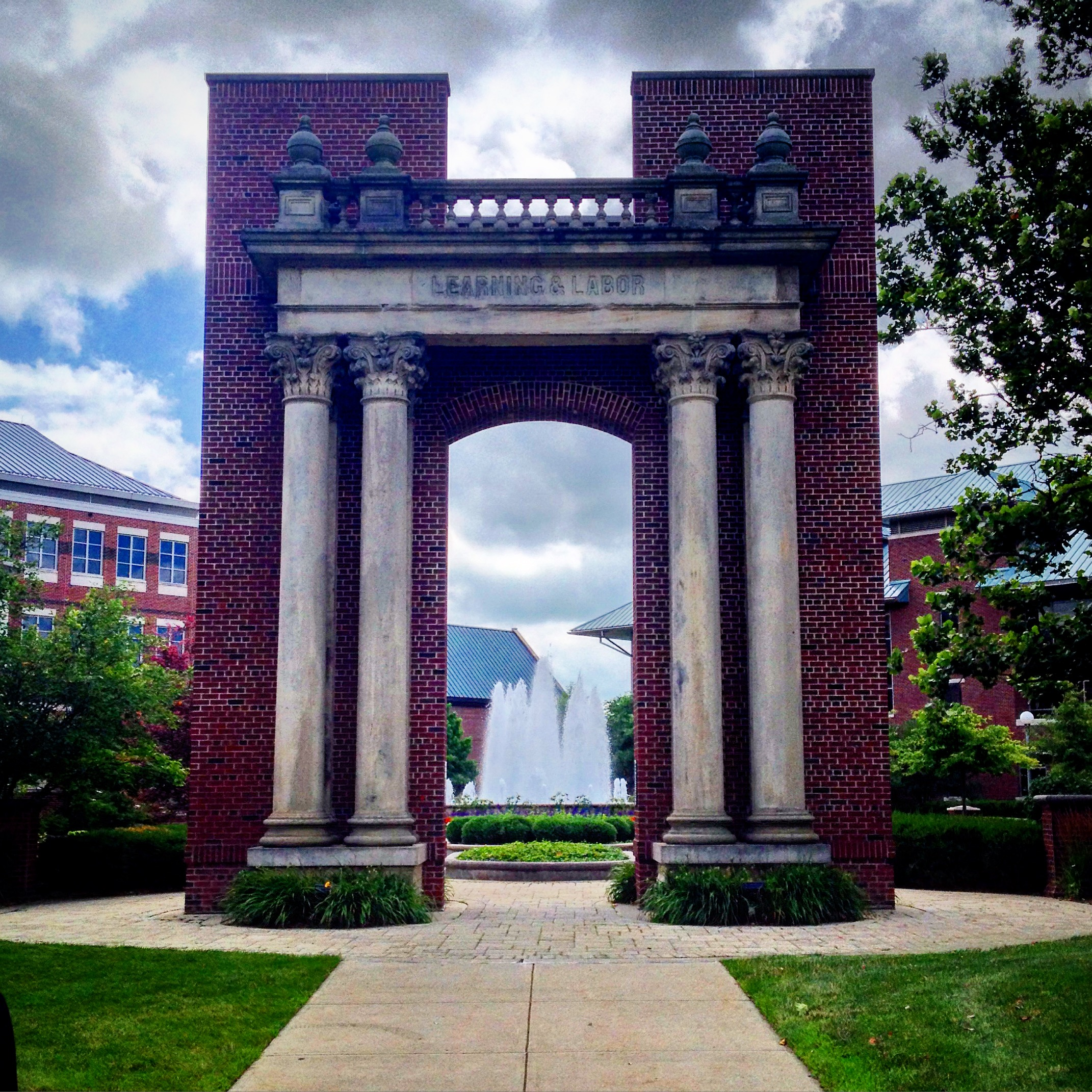
Hallene Gateway was dedicated in 1998 by donations from alumni Alan M. and Phyllis Welsh Hallene.

Twenty-seven alumni and faculty members of the University of Illinois Urbana-Champaign have won a Pulitzer Prize. As of 2019, the University of Illinois Urbana-Champaign alumni, faculty, and researchers include 24 Nobel laureates (including 11 alumni). In particular, John Bardeen is the only person to have won two Nobel prizes in physics, having done so in 1956 and 1972 while on faculty at the university. In 2003, two faculty members won Nobel prizes in different disciplines: Paul C. Lauterbur for physiology or medicine, and Anthony Leggett for physics.

Alumni and faculty have invented the LED and the quantum well laser (Nick Holonyak, B.S. 1950, M.S. 1951, Ph.D. 1954), DSL (John Cioffi, B.S. 1978), JavaScript (Brendan Eich, M.S. 1986), the integrated circuit (Jack Kilby, B.S. 1947), the transistor (John Bardeen, faculty, 1951–1991), the pH meter (Arnold Beckman, B.S. 1922, M.S. 1923), MRI (Paul C. Lauterbur), the plasma screen (Donald Bitzer, B.S. 1955, M.S. 1956, Ph.D. 1960), color plasma display (Larry F. Weber, B.S. 1968 M.S. 1971 Ph.D. 1975), the training methodology called PdEI and the coin counter (James P. Liautaud, B.S. 1963), the statistical algorithm called Gibbs sampling in computer vision and the machine learning technique called random forests (Donald Geman, B.A. 1965), and are responsible for the structural design of such buildings as the Willis Tower, the John Hancock Center, and the Burj Khalifa.

Mathematician Richard Hamming, known for the Hamming code and Hamming distance, earned a PhD in mathematics from the university's Mathematics Department in 1942. Primetime Emmy Award-winning engineer Alan Bovik (B.S. 1980, M.S. 1982, Ph.D. 1984) invented neuroscience-based video quality measurement tools that pervade television, social media and home cinema. Structural engineer Fazlur Rahman Khan earned two master's degrees, and a PhD in structural engineering from the university.

Illinois alumni and faculty have founded numerous companies and organizations. Notable founders include Marc Andreessen, co-founder of Andreessen Horowitz (2009); Jerry Sanders, co-founder of AMD (1969); and Jerry Colangelo, founder of the Arizona Diamondbacks (1995). George Halas, who founded the Chicago Bears (1920) and co-founded the NFL, and Reshma Saujani, founder of Girls Who Code (2012), also made significant contributions. In technology, Marc Andreessen and Brendan Eich co-founded Mozilla Corporation and Netscape in the 1990s, while Larry Ellison and Bob Miner co-founded Oracle (1977). Other tech innovators include Nathan Gettings (Palantir Technologies, 2003), Luke Nosek and Max Levchin (PayPal, 1998), Martin Eberhard (Tesla, Inc., 2003), and Stephen Wolfram and Theodore Gray (Wolfram Research, 1987). Additionally, Hugh Hefner founded Playboy Enterprises (1953), Thomas Siebel co-founded Siebel Systems (1993), and Jerry Yue founded Brain Technologies, Inc. (2010). Other prominent companies like Yelp (2004) and YouTube (2005) were co-founded by Jeremy Stoppelman, Russel Simmons, Steve Chen, and Jawed Karim. Alumni have also led several companies, including McDonald's, Goldman Sachs, BP, Kodak, Shell, General Motors, AT&T, and General Electric and others.

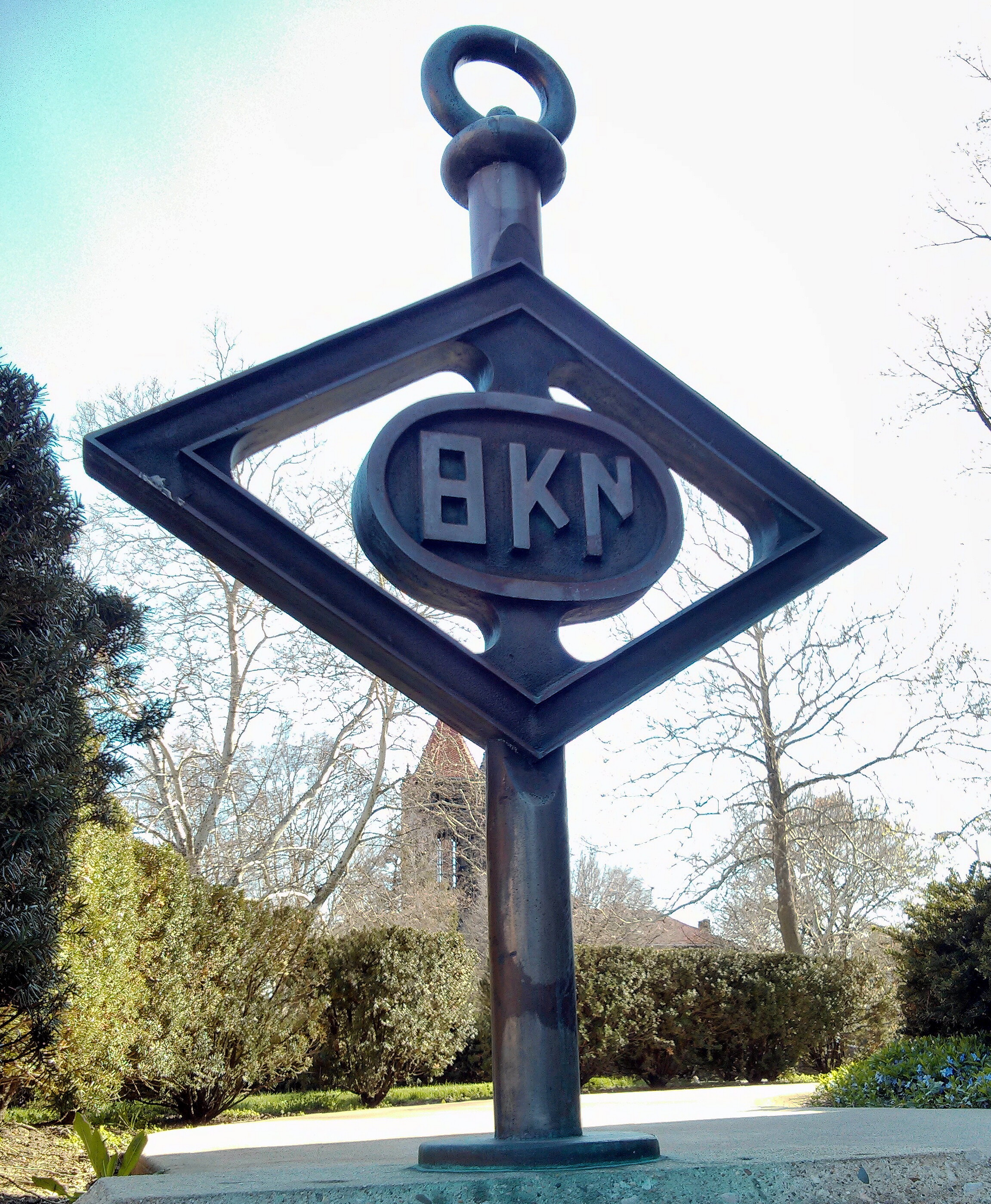
Eta Kappa Nu was founded at U of I in 1904.

Alumni have founded many organizations, including the Susan G. Komen for the Cure and Project Gutenberg, and have served in a wide variety of government and public interest roles. Rafael Correa, President of The Republic of Ecuador from 2007 to 2017, secured his M.S. and PhD degrees from the university's Economics Department in 1999 and 2001 respectively. Nathan C. Ricker attended Illinois and in 1873 was the first person to graduate in the United States with a certificate in architecture. Mary L. Page, the first woman to obtain a degree in architecture, also graduated from the U of I. Disability rights activist and co-organizer of the 504 Sit-in, Kitty Cone, attended during the 1960s, but left six hours short of her degree to continue her activism in New York.

In sports, baseball pitcher Ken Holtzman was a two-time All Star major leaguer, and threw two no-hitters in his career. In sports entertainment, David Otunga became a two-time WWE Tag Team Champion.

Eta Kappa Nu (HKN) was founded at the University of Illinois Urbana-Champaign as the national honor society for electrical engineering in 1904. Maurice LeRoy Carr (B.S. 1905) and Edmund B. Wheeler (B.S. 1905) were part of the founding group of ten students, and they served as the first and second national presidents of ΗΚΝ. The Eta Kappa Nu organization is now the international honor society for Institute of Electrical and Electronics Engineers. The U of I collegiate chapter is known as the Alpha chapter of ΗΚΝ. Lowell P. Hager was the head of the Department of Biochemistry from 1969 until 1989 and was elected to the National Academy of Sciences in 1995.

James Holzhauer, the fourth-highest-earning American game show contestant of all time and holder of several Jeopardy! records, attended University of Illinois Urbana-Champaign. He was a member of the Worldwide Youth in Science and Engineering Team that won the state competition for the university, contributing by taking first place in physics and second in math. Holzhauer graduated with a Bachelor of Science degree in mathematics in 2005.
