= College of Applied Health Sciences (University of Illinois Urbana-Champaign) =

College in Illinois, U.S.

Coordinates: 40°6′13.0″N 88°13′57.8″W

- Type: Public
- Established: 1895
- Parent institution: University of Illinois Urbana-Champaign
- Endowment: US $20.5 million (2011)
- Dean: Cheryl Hanley-Maxwell, PhD
- Students: 2,566
- Undergraduates: 2,147
- Postgraduates: 419
- Location: Champaign, Illinois, United States

The College of Applied Health Sciences (AHS), formerly the College of Applied Life Studies, is an undergraduate and graduate school at the University of Illinois Urbana-Champaign. It can trace its roots back to 1895, with the foundation of the Department of Physical Training for Men. AHS's mission is "to advance research, instruction and public engagement that promotes the development of healthy, livable communities, facilitates optimal living with disability and promotes health and wellness across the lifespan and throughout a diverse society."

== Facilities ==
- George Huff Hall – location of the College of Applied Health Sciences, the Department of Community Health, and the Department of Recreation, Sport and Tourism
- Louise Freer Hall – location of the Department of Kinesiology
- Speech and Hearing Science Building – location of the Department of Speech and Hearing Science

== Programs ==
Community Health – Founded in 1957 as Health and Safety Studies. It was merged with the Department of Rehabilitation Education in 1998 and in 2004, the Faculty Senate supported the merging of Community Health with the Department of Kinesiology. The program offers three concentrations, in Health Education and Promotion, Health Planning and Administration, and Rehabilitation Studies. The degree prepares you for work in the healthcare setting, typically in a hospital, a non-profit organization or in public health. The professional core includes classes in contemporary health issues, public health promotion, healthcare systems, health behavior and epidemiology. In 2011, the Department of Community Health created a Masters of Public Health degree, which can be earned as a 5-year joint degree with the B.S. in Community Health.

Kinesiology – Kinesiology traces it roots back to the Department of Physical Training for Men and the Department of Physical Culture for Women in 1895. These departments merged in 1972 and were renamed the Department of Physical Education, which was renamed to the Department of Kinesiology in 1987. Kinesiology prepares people for careers in human-movement related fields or for advanced studies or graduate work. The kinesiology core includes classes in human movement, motor development, and the psychosocial aspects of physical activity. Students in this program can also earn the Masters of Public Health as a joint 5-year degree program.

Speech and Hearing Science – Originally established within the College of Liberal Arts and Sciences in 1973 as the Department of Speech Correction. It became part of the College of Applied Health Sciences in 1991 and was renamed the Department of Speech and Hearing Science. The major offers three tracks, Human Communication Sciences, which gives a broad overview of human communication, and Audiology and Speech-Language Pathology, which are pre-professional tracks for graduate school. Students in the major take courses in speech pathology, audiology, the speech mechanism and phonetics.

Recreation, Sport & Tourism – RST began in 1937 as one class called Principles of Recreation and in a matter of ten years, a Bachelor's Degree in Recreation was created. It was elevated from a program to a department in 1957, and underwent many name changes before finally settling on the Department of Recreation, Sport and Tourism in 2004. Students in Recreation, Sport and Tourism complete classes in leisure theory, management, and leadership and are offered three concentrations in recreation management, sports management or tourism management. The major prepares students to work in park, leisure and tourism management fields.
