= Warren Brown (television host) =

American television host

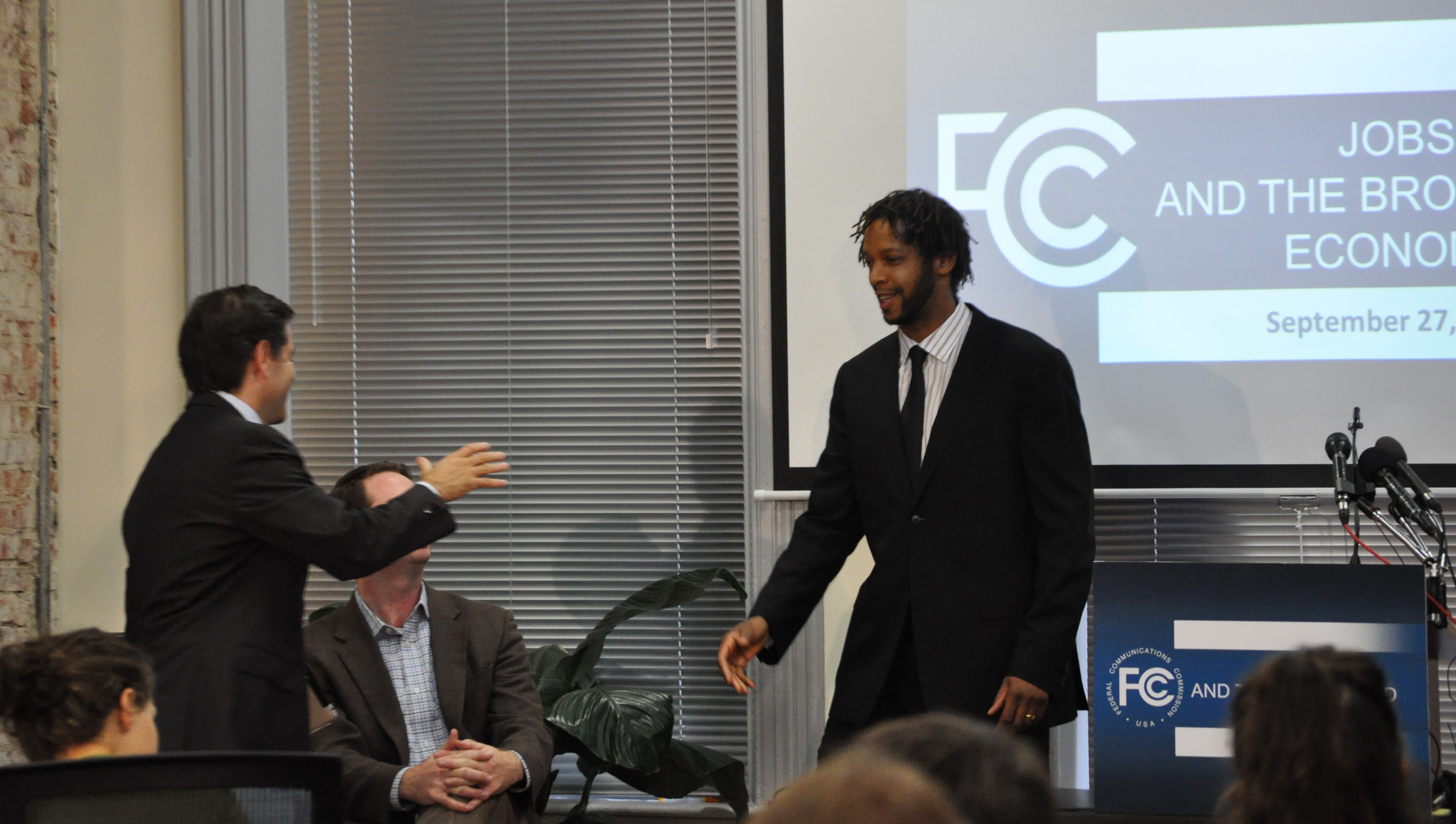
Brown (right)

Warren Brown is the host of the Food Network show, Sugar Rush. He had a career in health education and law until he decided that his true calling was to become a pastry chef, and is the founder and owner of bakery CakeLove and Love Café in Washington, DC. The original CakeLove location on U Street NW in Washington, DC was opened in 2002, with LoveCafe opening down the street in 2003. Five CakeLove locations were in the greater Washington area. The CakeLove retail bakeries closed, with the last location closing in 2015, and the CakeLove brand was redesigned to sell " CakeLove in a Jar."

Brown received his bachelor's degree from Brown University and a J.D. and master's degree from The George Washington University Law School. He graduated from University School in Hunting Valley, Ohio in 1989. His first cookbook, CakeLove: How to Make Cakes from Scratch, was released in April 2008.
