= Ronnie Anderson =

American football player (born 1974)

No. 83
- Position: Wide receiver

Personal information
- Born: February 27, 1974 (age 52); Cleveland, Ohio, U.S.
- Listed height: 6 ft 0 in (1.83 m)
- Listed weight: 198 lb (90 kg)

Career information
- High school: University School (OH)
- College: Allegheny
- NFL draft: 1997: undrafted

Career history
- Green Bay Packers (1997)*; Pittsburgh Steelers (1997)*; Green Bay Packers (1997); Arizona Cardinals (1998); Miami Dolphins (2001)*
- * Offseason or practice squad member only

Career NFL statistics
- Games played: 4
- Stats at Pro Football Reference

Ronnie Darrell Anderson (born February 27, 1974) is a former wide receiver in the National Football League (NFL). He first was a member of the Green Bay Packers during the 1997 NFL season, but did not see any playing time during the season, instead spending the entire year on the team's practice squad. Anderson was a member of the Arizona Cardinals during the 1998 NFL season and appeared in four games.

He played on the undergraduate level at Allegheny College and finished his career as the school's career leader in receptions at the end of the 1996 season. Anderson competed in track and field for the Gators as well, and was an all-conference standout in both sports, earning multiple accolades from the NCAC.

Ronnie Anderson has played in 16 games, in his 2-year career, with the Arizona Cardinals and Green Bay Packers. He has also participated in 3 playoff games. He was not drafted.
