= Sugar Rush (2005 TV series) =

American television series

Sugar Rush is an American cooking television program that aired on the Food Network from 2005 to 2007.

It was hosted by Warren Brown, a former lawyer who decided to become a pastry chef. Brown, who ran a pastry shop, Cake Love, and cafe, Love Cafe in Washington, DC, meets other pastry chefs and dessert makers and cooks with them. The show was described Brown "travel[ing] the country in search of interesting, outrageous desserts." Food Network staff said it was the first show featuring a Washington, DC–area food personality.

It had a 13-episode first season and was picked up for a second season. A total of two seasons aired on the Food Network with a total of 26 episodes.

The show originally aired at 9:30pm on Wednesdays and included guests such as TV baker Duff Goldman and celebrity chef Jose Andres.

It is currently available on Amazon Prime and Sflix.
