= Saint-Étienne-des-Grès =

Saint-Étienne-des-Grès may refer to:

- Saint-Étienne-des-Grès, Quebec, a community in the Mauricie region of the province of Quebec in Canada
- Saint-Étienne-des-Grès, Paris, a former church and parish in Paris, France, destroyed in the French Revolution
