= Saint-Étienne-des-Grès, Paris =

Church in Paris

Coordinates: 48.8472°N 2.3439°E

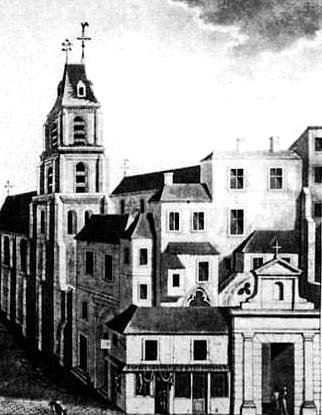
An exterior view of Saint-Étienne-des-Grès as it appeared before the French Revolution, taken from Book Three of Tableau historique et pittoresque de Paris by Jacques Bins, comte de Saint-Victor.

Saint-Étienne-des-Grès was a church and parish in Paris, France, formerly located in the Latin Quarter on the Rue Saint-Jacques.

== History ==
Saint-Étienne-des-Grès on Truschet and Hoyau map (1550).

Saint-Étienne-des-Grès was located on the Rue Saint-Jacques, on the site of the present Faculty of Law. It was one of the early centers of Christianity in Paris; it stood on a site said to be that of an oratory which was erected by St. Denis to St. Stephen. Its foundation dates to around the sixth century. Saint-Étienne was one of five Merovingian churches marking the road from Paris to Orleans.

The original church was destroyed by the Vikings, but rebuilt in the 11th century. Canons were installed in 1045 to serve the church and pray for the king. It became a parish sometime before 1080, but the parish was absorbed by St. Benedict's between 1195 and 1205. The Chapter existed until 1790. The collegiate church was demolished in 1792.

=== Notre Dame de Bonne Délivrance ===
The church notably contained a Black Madonna, the Notre Dame de Bonne Délivrance (Our Lady of Good Deliverance), also known as the "Black Madonna of Paris". The statue dates from the 14th century, replacing an 11th-century version. It is 150 centimeters (59 in) tall, and made from painted limestone. The Virgin wears a white veil and dark blue mantle ornamented with fleur-de-lis over a red robe.

The Royal Confraternity of Notre Dame de Bonne Délivrance was established in 1533. Louis XIII and Anne of Austria were members. The shine was visited by many notable French saints, including Vincent de Paul and Francis de Sales—it was in front of the statue that de Sales recited the Memorare, and made his religious conversion.

In 1703, a young seminarian named Claude Poullart des Places gathered a dozen of his companions at Saint-Étienne-des-Grès and consecrated the group to the Virgin; that act was the beginning of the Congregation of the Holy Ghost. Other notable pilgrims to the statue—some before the Revolution, some after—have included Claude Bernard, Jean-Jacques Olier, John Bosco, Prosper Guéranger, and Madeleine Sophie Barat.

When the church was destroyed during the Revolution, all its contents were sold; the statue was saved by a pious rich woman named Madame de Carignan. De Carignan was arrested during the Reign of Terror, and she would pray to Our Lady in prison with others who had been arrested for their Catholicism. When de Carignan was freed in 1806, she gave the statue to the Sisters of St. Thomas of Villeneuve, who had been imprisoned with her. The statue is still located in the chapel of the Congregation of the Sisters of St. Thomas of Villeneuve in Neuilly-sur-Seine. The feast of Our Lady of Good Deliverance is July 18.
