= Alain Mayama =

Congolese Spiritan priest (born 1971)

Fr. Alain Mayama

Alain Mayama (born 1971) is a Congolese Catholic priest and member of the Congregation of the Holy Spirit, commonly known as the Spiritans. He has served as the congregation's 25th Superior General since 2021 and is the first African to have been elected to the office.

== Biography ==
Mayama was born in the Republic of the Congo in 1971. He undertook his initial Spiritan formation at the Spiritan International Philosophate Daniel Brottier in Libreville, Gabon, where he studied philosophy. He completed his novitiate at Mbalmayo, Cameroon, and studied theology at the Spiritan International School of Theology in Nigeria. He made his perpetual religious profession in 1999 and was ordained a priest in 2000.

Mayama began his missionary ministry in Cameroon as a formator. He later studied at Duquesne University in Pittsburgh, where he earned master's and doctoral degrees. He received a PhD in theology in 2007; his dissertation, The Turn to the Neighbor: Emmanuel Levinas's Conceptual Affinities with Liberation Theology, examined the relationship between the philosophy of Emmanuel Levinas and the liberation theology of Gustavo Gutiérrez and Jon Sobrino. During his doctoral studies, he also served as a hospital chaplain in Port Huron, Michigan, from 2007 to 2008.

Mayama returned to the Spiritan International Philosophate Daniel Brottier in Libreville in 2008, serving as a formator until 2010. He later served as rector of the philosophate and taught there and at the Grand Séminaire Saint Augustin in Libreville. In 2010, he was elected provincial superior of the Spiritans' Congo-Brazzaville province. At the congregation's General Chapter in Bagamoyo, Tanzania, in 2012, he was elected a general assistant and subsequently served at the Spiritan generalate in Rome.

=== Superior general ===
On 18 October 2021, the Spiritans' General Chapter, again meeting in Bagamoyo, elected Mayama as the congregation's 25th superior general, succeeding John Fogarty. His election made him the first African superior general in the congregation's history. He was elected to an eight-year term running through 2029.

Following his election, Mayama identified missionary formation and the allocation of resources to priority missions as concerns for his tenure. He told ACI Africa that Spiritan formation should place greater emphasis on preparing members with skills suited to particular missions and that the congregation as a whole should support missions that lacked sufficient local resources.

== Selected works ==
- Mayama, Alain (2010). Emmanuel Levinas' Conceptual Affinities with Liberation Theology. New York: Peter Lang. doi:10.3726/978-1-4539-0447-3. ISBN 978-1-4331-0654-5.
- Mayama, Alain, ed. (2012). Repenser la relation homme-milieu en Afrique (in French). Paris: L'Harmattan. ISBN 978-2-296-96781-6.

Catholic Church titles
Preceded by John Fogarty	Superior General of the Congregation of the Holy Spirit; 2021–present	Succeeded by Incumbent
