= Memorare =

Catholic prayer towards the Virgin Mary

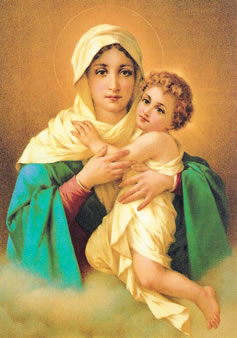
Refugium Peccatorum Madonna, an example of Marian art

Memorare ("Remember, O Most Gracious Virgin Mary") is a Catholic prayer seeking the intercession of the Blessed Virgin Mary. It first appeared as part of a longer 15th-century prayer, Ad sanctitatis tuae pedes, dulcissima Virgo Maria. Memorare, from the Latin "Remember," is frequently misattributed to the 12th-century Cistercian monk Saint Bernard of Clairvaux, apparently due to confusion with its 17th-century popularizer, Father Claude Bernard, who stated that he learned it from his own father.

== Modern version ==
The modern version is taken from that indulgenced by Pope Pius IX in 1846, Raccolta, #339 (S. C. Ind., Dec. 11, 1846; S. P. Ap., Sept. 8, 1935) Encr. Ind. #32:

Memorare, piissima Virgo Maria,
a saeculo non esse auditum, quemquam ad tua currentem praesidia,
tua implorantem auxilia, tua petentem suffragia,
esse derelictum.
Ego tali animatus confidentia,
ad te, Virgo Virginum, Mater, curro,
ad te venio, coram te gemens peccator assisto.
Noli, Mater Verbi,
verba mea despicere;
sed audi propitia et exaudi.
Amen.

Remember, O most gracious Virgin Mary,
that never was it known that anyone who fled to your protection,
implored your help, or sought your intercession,
was left unaided.
Inspired by this confidence,
I fly unto you, O Virgin of virgins, my Mother.
To you do I come, before you I stand, sinful and sorrowful.
O Mother of the Word Incarnate,
despise not my petitions,
but in your mercy, hear and answer me.
Amen.

== History of the prayer ==
This prayer is originally from a longer prayer of the 15th century, "Ad sanctitatis tuae pedes, dulcissima Virgo Maria".

=== Francis de Sales ===
The de Sales family were members of the minor nobility and devout Catholics, but St. Francis de Sales fell victim to the religious turmoil of his age. The question of predestination, the hottest point of contention between Catholic and Calvinist theologians, tormented him while he was a student in Paris. In his distress over the uncertain fate of his soul he cried out to God, "Whatever happens, Lord, may I at least love you in this life if I cannot love you in eternity." At the age of 18, while studying at the Jesuit run Collège de Clermont at the University of Paris, according to the book The Spirit of St. Francis de Sales, by Jean-Pierre Camus:

The evil spirit was permitted by God to insinuate into his mind the terrible idea that he was one of the number of the damned. This delusion took such possession of his soul that he lost his appetite, was unable to sleep, and day by day grew more wasted and languid. His tutor and director noticing how his health was affected, and how pale, listless, and joyless he had become often questioned him as to the cause of his dejection and evident suffering, but his tormentor who had filled his mind with this delusion, being what is called a dumb devil, the poor youth could give no explanation.

For one whole month he suffered this mental torture, this agony of soul. He had lost all the sweetness of divine love, but not, happily, his fidelity to it. He looked back with happy tears to the happy time when he was, as it were, inebriated with that sweetness, nor did any ray of hope illumine the darkness of that night of despair. In late December, at last, led by a divine inspiration, he entered a church to pray that this agony might pass.

On his knees before a statue of the Blessed Virgin he implored the assistance of the Mother of Mercy with tears and sighs, and the most fervent devotion.

According to De Sales' Selected Letters, the "torment of despair came to a sudden end" as he knelt in prayer before the statue of Our Lady of Good Deliverance (the Black Madonna) at the church of Saint-Étienne-des-Grès, Paris, saying the Memorare. Francis credited the Blessed Virgin with "saving him from falling into despair or heresy"; he "recited the Memorare day after day", and she "did not leave him unaided."

=== Claude Bernard ===
It was popularized in the 17th century by Fr. Claude Bernard (d. 1641), who learned it from his father. Bernard's devotion to Our Lady under the title Consolatrix Afflictorum (Comforter of the Afflicted) led him to promote recourse to her intercession among the poor and condemned prisoners. According to the book Familiar Prayers: Their Origin and History written by Fr. Herbert Thurston S.J. in 1953:

Fr. Claude Bernard, known as the "Poor Priest", zealously dedicated himself to the preaching and aiding of prisoners and criminals condemned to death. Trusting his charges to the care and intercession of the Blessed Virgin Mary, Fr. Bernard employed the Memorare extensively in his work of evangelization to great effect. Many a criminal was reconciled to God through his efforts. At one time he had more than 200,000 leaflets printed with the Memorare in various languages so he could distribute the leaflets wherever he felt they would do some good. Part of the reason Fr. Claude Bernard held the prayer in such high regard was because he himself felt that he had been miraculously cured by its use. In a letter to Queen Anne of Austria, wife of Louis XIII, he wrote that he was deathly ill once. In fear of his life he recited the Memorare and immediately began to get well again. Feeling unworthy of such a miracle, he attributed the cure to some unknown natural cause. Sometime later, Brother Fiacre, a discalced Augustinian, came to call upon Fr. Bernard. The good brother begged Fr. Bernard's pardon for disturbing him, but he desired to know how Fr. Bernard was getting along. Brother Fiacre then went on to say that the Virgin Mary had appeared to him in a vision, told him of Fr. Bernard's illness, told him how she had cured Fr. Bernard of it, and that he was to assure Fr. Bernard of this fact. Fr. Bernard then goes on to write in his letter that he was ashamed of his ingratitude in attributing the cure to natural causes, and asked for God's forgiveness in the matter.

The "Memorare" played a part in the conversion of Marie-Alphonse Ratisbonne, when upon the dare of a Catholic acquaintance he agreed to wear the Miraculous Medal and recite the prayer for a month.

The prayer became popular in England by way of France, and appeared in the 1856 edition of Bishop Richard Challoner's The Garden of the Soul. In a 1918 article published in the Month on the theme of Familiar Prayers, Herbert Thurston discussed the "Memorare" as one of the prayers he considered representative of English Catholic prayer. By "familiar", Thurston meant those prayers most of the faithful knew by heart. There were at least five separate versions circulating at that time. Mary Heinman observes that the "Memorare" "...became an English Catholic favorite in the post-1850 period for reasons which had no direct connection to either papal directives or native tradition."

William Fitzgerald notes, "Calling on Mary to 'remember' is an act of boldness, but it is boldness justified by tradition....Mary needs no reminder of her role in the realm of salvation. However, those who call upon her do require such reminders (if not specifically, then more generally) to remind them of their place as supplicants before the Virgin Mary." Asking Mary to intercede as our Advocate before God does not guarantee that a supplicant's specific request will be granted, only that divine aid and assistance in the supplicant's best interest will be given through Mary's help.

== Indulgence ==
In the Roman Catholic Church, the Enchiridion Indulgentiarum of 2004 provides for partial indulgence for devoutly reciting the prayer under the normal conditions.

== See also ==
- Sub tuum praesidium
- Angelus
- Marian devotions
- Power of Christian prayer
