= Francis Libermann =

French Venerable

Venerable Francis Paul Libermann CSSp
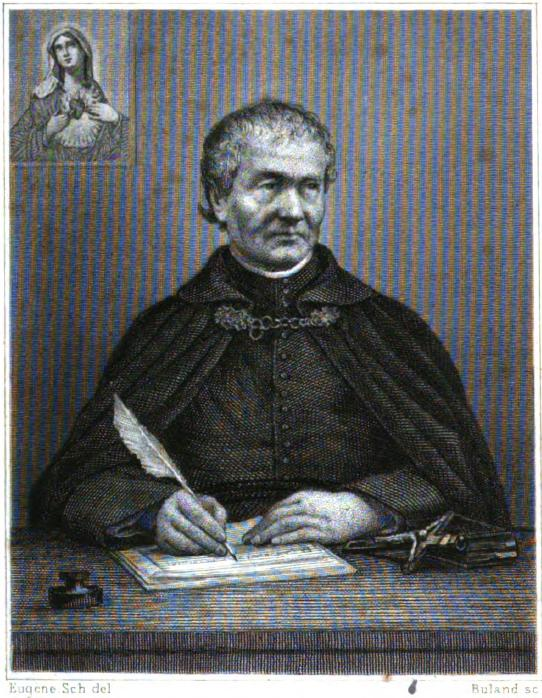
- An 1880 lithograph of Francis Libermann (the image in the upper left corner is of the Immaculate Heart of Mary)
- Born: Jacob Libermann; 12 April 1802; Saverne, France
- Died: 2 February 1852 (aged 49); Paris, France

Francis Mary Paul Libermann (French: François-Marie-Paul Libermann; born as Jacob Libermann; 12 April 1802 – 2 February 1852) was a French Jewish convert to the Catholic Church. He became a religious priest in the Congregation of the Holy Spirit and is best known for founding the Society of the Holy Heart of Mary, which later merged with the Spiritans. He was declared venerable by Pope Pius X in February 1910.

== Early life ==
Jacob Libermann was born into an Orthodox Jewish family in Saverne, Alsace, France in 1802. As a young man, Libermann prepared to follow in the footsteps of his father, the Chief Rabbi of Saverne.

He would later relate how he lost his faith in Judaism after entering a yeshiva. Treated with disdain by two of the professors there, he began to read French literature, especially Rousseau, with the result that he became an agnostic. Later during this period of agnosticism, another rabbinical student gave him a Hebrew translation of the Gospels. Being always a very moral person, Libermann was captivated by the high moral tone of Jesus' discourses, though he could not accept the supernatural elements in the Gospels. Then, however, his eldest brother first, and afterwards two other brothers, embraced Catholicism. Although Jacob deeply resented their change of religion, he gradually came to recognize their happiness, which was in strong contrast with his own distracted frame of mind.

After arriving in Paris, where his father had sent him to pursue his studies, he made the acquaintance of David Paul Drach, a convert from Judaism, who had him received into the College Stanislas. The knowledge of his conversion was long concealed from his father, who was horrified to learn of his favorite son's actions. When the news of his baptism reached Saverne, his father mourned him as dead.

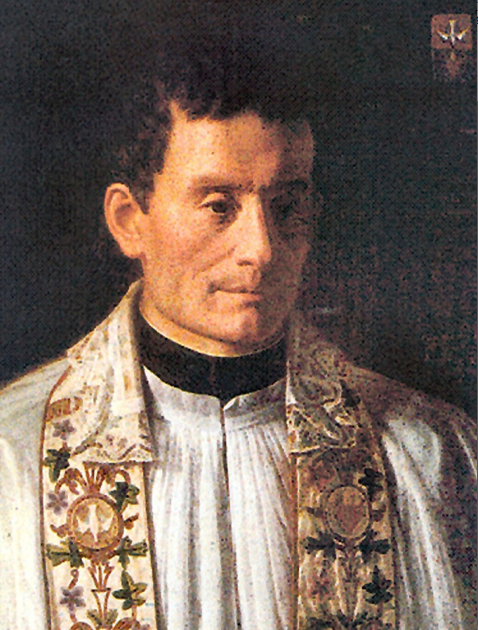
François Libermann, 19th century.

"That moment for me was one of extreme pain. My complete loneliness, the gloom of the cell with its one sky-light, the thought of being so far from my family, my country, all this plunged my heart into the deepest sadness and weighed down my heart with oppresive melancholy. Then it was that, remembering the God of my fathers, I cast myself on my knees and implored Him to enlighten me regarding the True Religion. I conjured him to make it known to me that the belief of Christians was true, if it was so; but if it was false, to remove me instantly far from it. The Lord, who is near to those who invoke him with their inmost soul, heard my prayer. I was at once enlightened; I saw the truth; faith penetrated my mind and heart. Setting myself to read Lhomond, I assented easily to all that it recounted of the life and death of Jesus Christ. Even the mystery of the Eucharist, though rather imprudently presented to my consideration, in no way repelled me. I believed all without difficulty. From that moment my greatest desire was to see myself plunged into the sacred Font; and my happiness was not long delayed. I was at once prepared for this admirable Sacrament, and received it on Christmas Eve. Next morning I was allowed to approach the Holy Table."

— Francis Libermann, describing his conversion from Judaism to the Roman Catholic Church

Jacob Libermann was baptized on 24 December 1826, taking the name François Marie Paul. He entered the Saint-Sulpice seminary in Paris in the same year to study for the priesthood.

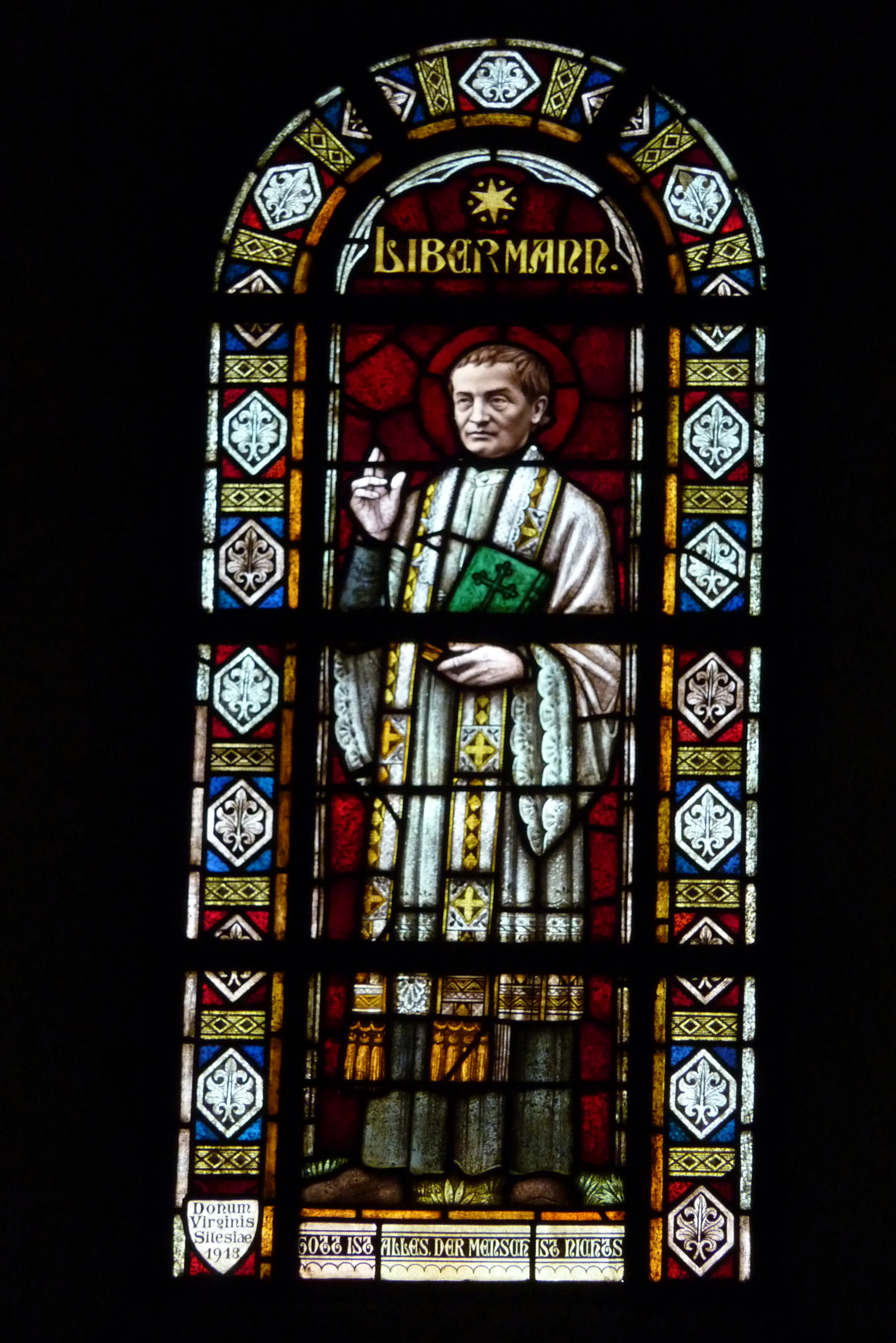
Window showing Ss. Mary Magdalen and Andrew in the former Premonstratensian monastery of Knechtsteden, Germany

== Priest and missionary ==
On the very eve of his ordination to the subdiaconate, he was stricken down by an attack of epilepsy which was to be his companion for the next five years. During that time he was kept by his charitable superiors at the seminary of Issy. It was there that he was brought into close apostolic relationship with two Creole seminarians, Frédéric Le Vavasseur, from Bourbon, and Eugene Tisserand, from Santo Domingo, both of whom were filled with zeal for the evangelization of the poor ex-slaves of those islands. Libermann suffered from epileptic seizures, which prevented his ordination for nearly fifteen years. It was only when these seizures ceased in 1841 that he was able to become a priest. After his ordination, Libermann created the Congregation of the Immaculate Heart of Mary centered around missionary activity towards newly freed slaves in Réunion, Haiti, and Mauritius.

As this group attracted more members, the Holy See merged his society with the older Congregation of the Holy Spirit, otherwise known as "Spiritans". Due to this event, Libermann is often referred to as the "second founder" of the Spiritans.

Although Libermann himself never went overseas, he recruited and educated missionaries going to Africa, both lay and clerical. He exhausted himself in the process of leading his enterprise, and died on 2 February 1852 before his 50th birthday. The Francis Libermann Catholic High School in Toronto and the Collège Libermann in Douala (Cameroon) are named in his honor.

== Beatification process ==
Libermann's cause was formally opened on 1 June 1876, granting him the title of Servant of God. He was declared venerable by Pope Pius X on 19 February 1910.

His letters, hundreds of which survive, are frequently used as a guide in the devotional life. Libermann was a pioneer of strategies now recognized as a blueprint for modern missionary activity. He urged the Spiritans to "become one with the people" so that each group received and understood the Gospel in the context of their own traditions.

== Gallery ==
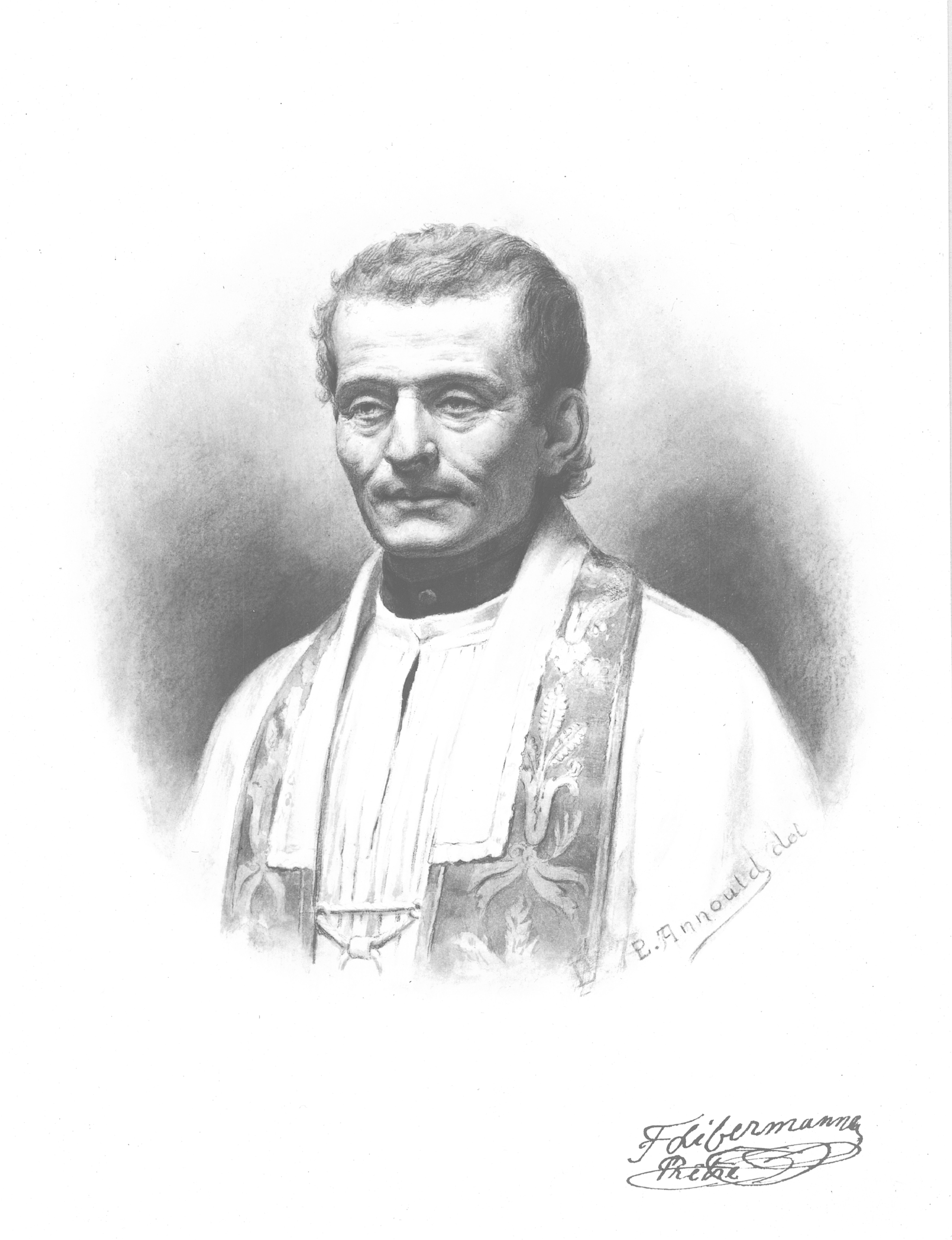
Charcoal Drawing of Libermann, circa 1900s by Pierre-Leon Annould

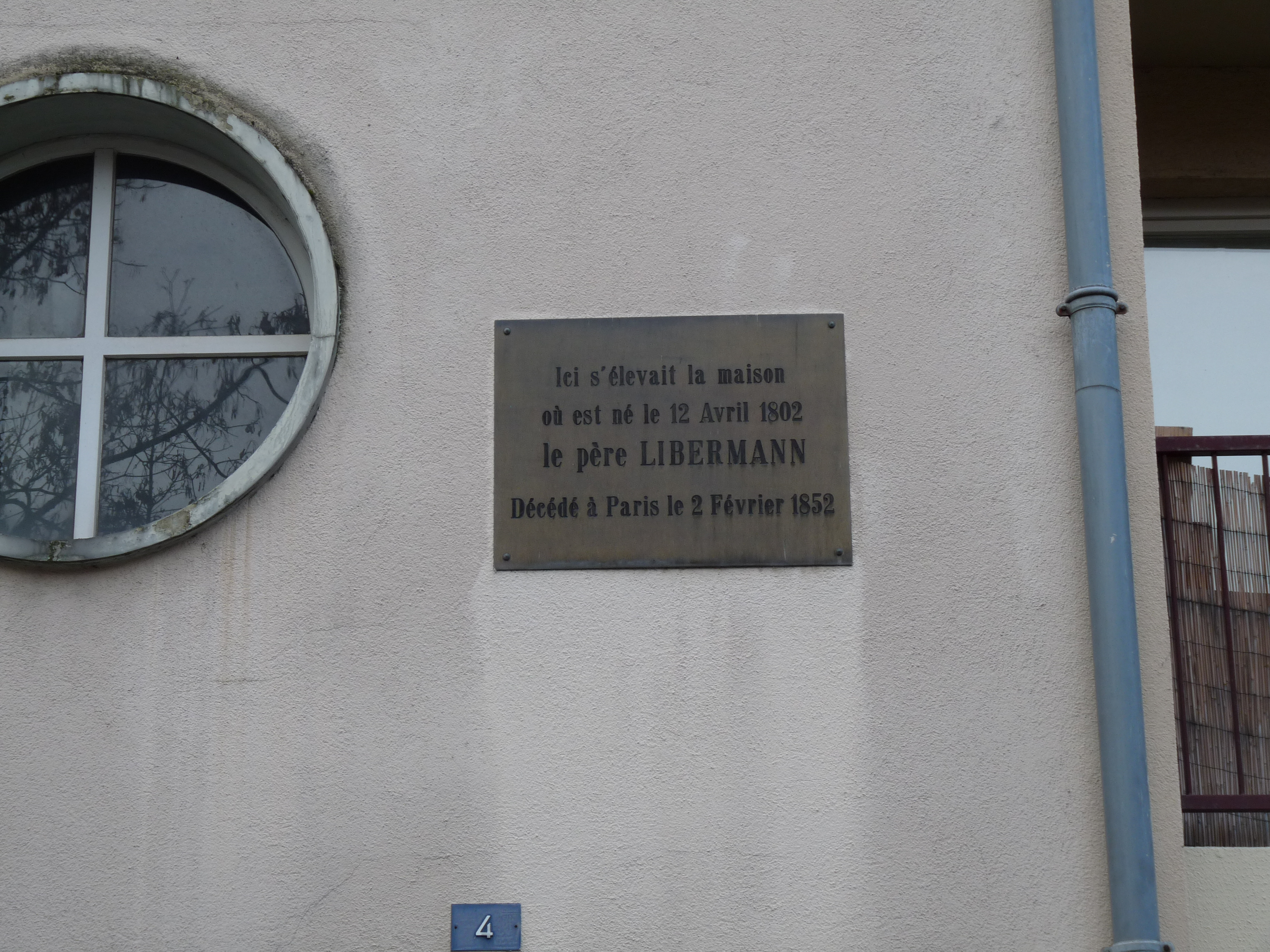
Commemorative plaque of François Libermann in Saverne (Bas-Rhin), his hometown

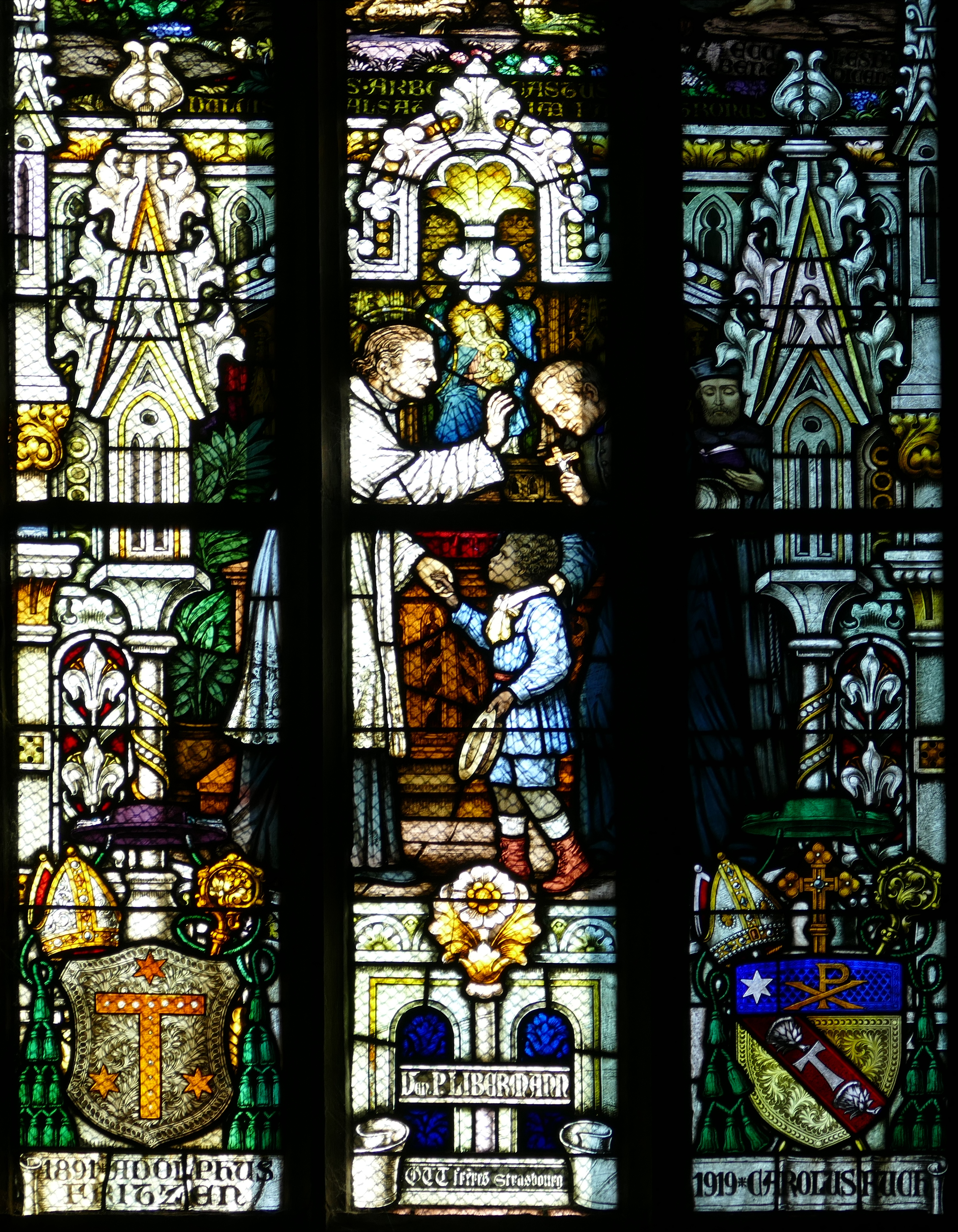
Stained glass, Church Notre-Dame-de-la-Nativité, Saverne, Alsace, Bas-Rhin, France, 1925

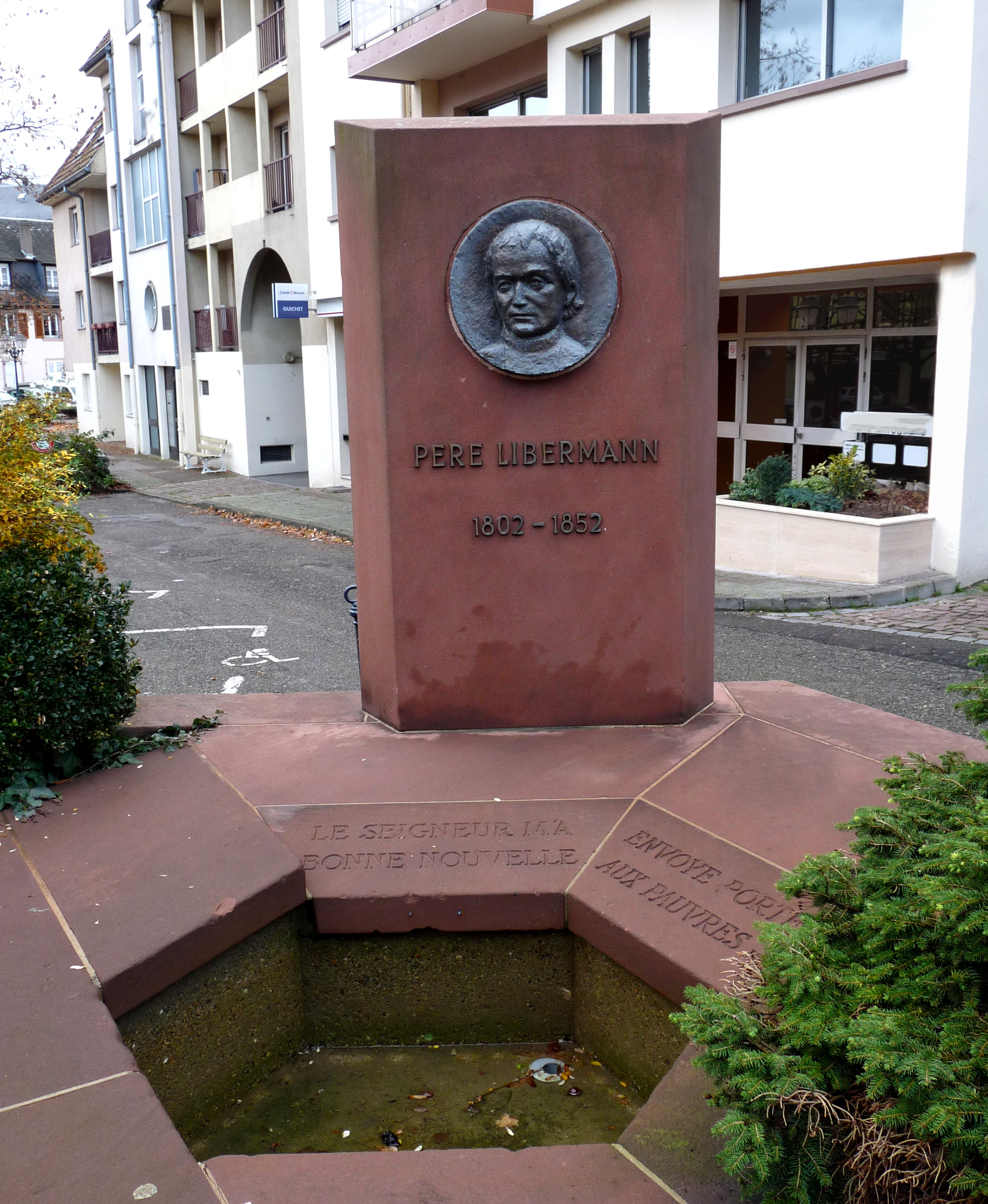
Supporter Monument dedicated to François Libermann at Saverne (Bas-Rhin), his Alsatian hometown

== Bibliography ==
- Goepfert, Prosper (1880). The Life of the Venerable Francis Mary Paul Libermann. Dublin: M. H. Gill & Son.
- Burke, Christy (2010). No Longer Slaves: the mission of Francis Libermann (1802–1852). Dublin: Columba Press.
- Kelly, Bernard (2005). Life Began at Forty: The Second Conversion of Francis Libermann CSSp. Dublin: Paraclete Press.

Catholic Church titles
Preceded by Alexandre Monnet	Superior General of the Congregation of the Holy Spirit; 1848–1852	Succeeded by Ignace Schwindenhammer
