= John Fogarty (priest) =

Irish Spiritan priest (born 1952)

John Fogarty (born 9 April 1952) is an Irish Catholic priest and member of the Congregation of the Holy Spirit, commonly known as the Spiritans. He has served as provincial superior of the congregation's United States province since 2024. He previously served as the 24th Superior General of the congregation from 2012 to 2021.

== Biography ==
Fogarty was born on 9 April 1952 in Finglas, Dublin. He joined the Spiritans after completing secondary school and graduated in physics and mathematics from University College Dublin in 1976. He made his final religious profession on 2 October 1979 and was ordained a priest on 27 September 1981. He received a Licentiate of Sacred Theology from the University of Fribourg in Switzerland in 1982.

From 1982 to 1986, Fogarty served in parish ministry in the Diocese of Kumasi in Ghana. He was a member of the Spiritans' provincial council in Dublin from 1986 to 1989 and rector of the Spiritan Institute of Philosophy in Ejisu, Ghana, from 1990 to 1994. Returning to Ireland, he served as assistant provincial from 1994 to 1998. He was then elected first assistant to the superior general and served at the congregation's headquarters in Rome from 1998 to 2004.

In 2005, Fogarty became the first director of the Center for Spiritan Studies at Duquesne University in Pittsburgh. During his first period at Duquesne, he also served as director of the university's Office of Mission and Identity. In June 2009, he became provincial superior of the newly unified United States province of the Spiritans. He was re-elected to a second term in June 2012.

On 11 July 2012, the Spiritans' General Chapter at Bagamoyo, Tanzania, elected Fogarty the congregation's 24th superior general. His eight-year mandate was extended after the General Chapter scheduled for 2020 was postponed because of the COVID-19 pandemic. His tenure ended on 18 October 2021, when the General Chapter elected Alain Mayama as his successor.

In 2022, Fogarty returned to Duquesne University as senior advisor to the president for Spiritan mission and campus culture. In June 2024, the United States provincial chapter elected him provincial superior for a four-year mandate beginning that October. He was installed on 2 October 2024. Fogarty also serves as chair of the Duquesne University Corporation.

Catholic Church titles
Preceded by Jean-Paul Hoch	Superior General of the Congregation of the Holy Spirit; 2012–2021	Succeeded by Alain Mayama
