= Spiritan International School of Theology =

Catholic seminary in Enugu State, Nigeria

- Type: Catholic seminary and theological school
- Established: 1987
- Religious affiliation: Congregation of the Holy Spirit
- Academic affiliations: University of Nigeria; Duquesne University
- Location: Attakwu, Enugu State, Nigeria
- Website: sist.edu.ng

The Spiritan International School of Theology (SIST) is a Catholic seminary and theological school in Attakwu, Nkanu West, Enugu State, Nigeria. Established in 1987 by the Congregation of the Holy Spirit, commonly known as the Spiritans, it was created as a regional institution for the formation and theological education of missionaries in anglophone West Africa. SIST is affiliated with the University of Nigeria for its bachelor's programme in religion and cultural studies and with Duquesne University in Pittsburgh for graduate study in theology.

== History ==
The proposal for a regional Spiritan school of theology in West Africa arose at a meeting of Spiritan major superiors in Rome in September 1983. Representatives of Spiritan jurisdictions in Nigeria, Kwara-Benue, the Gambia, Ghana, Sierra Leone-Liberia and Senegal participated. At a subsequent meeting in June 1984, the superiors agreed to establish a regional seminary and theological school in Enugu. The project was intended in part to respond to increasing numbers of Spiritan vocations in Nigeria and Ghana and to develop a programme of missionary formation attentive to African cultural contexts.

The school was established at Attakwu in 1987 and formally opened on 10 December 1988. Its founding rector was Nigerian Spiritan theologian Elochukwu Uzukwu. SIST developed an academic affiliation with Duquesne University for graduate theological studies. In 1992, the Senate of the University of Nigeria approved an affiliation through which SIST students could receive a bachelor's degree in religion and the first students in the programme graduated in 1995.

SIST's governing council approved diploma and higher diploma programmes in theology in 2009. In 2019, the school reorganised its academic structure into a Department of Theology, a Department of Religion and Cultural Studies, a School of Post-Graduate Studies, and a General and Foundation Studies Unit.

== Academics ==
SIST provides programmes in religion and theology for seminarians as well as other students. Its programmes include certificates, diplomas and higher diplomas in theology, a bachelor's programme in religion and cultural studies affiliated with the University of Nigeria, and a Master of Arts programme in theology through Duquesne University. The school's curriculum combines Catholic theological and priestly formation with an emphasis on missiology and contextual theology in Africa.

The National Universities Commission lists SIST as an approved affiliate of the University of Nigeria. Following an accreditation visit on 28 January 2025, the commission granted full accreditation to the school's affiliated Religious Studies programme.

SIST is also an additional instructional location of Duquesne University within the scope of Duquesne's accreditation by the Middle States Commission on Higher Education.

== Research and publications ==
SIST has organised conferences on missiology since its early years. Its first Missiology Symposium, held in May 1989, addressed healing and exorcism in Nigeria; the proceedings were published in 1992 as the first volume of the SIST Symposium Series.

The school publishes the annual African Journal of Contextual Theology, which focuses on theological and religious questions from African and contextual perspectives. It also publishes the peer-reviewed SIST Journal of Religion and Humanities, established in 2021, which publishes work in religion, theology, philosophy and other fields in the humanities.

== See also ==
- Congregation of the Holy Spirit
- Duquesne University
- List of Catholic seminaries
