= Maasai Creed =

1960 Kenyan Christian statement of faith

The Maasai Creed is a creed composed in 1960 by the Maasai people of East Africa in collaboration with missionaries from the Congregation of the Holy Ghost. An early publication of the Maasai Creed appears in Fr. Vincent J. Donovan, "Christianity Rediscovered", in which Donovan tells of his work among the Maasai through which they developed a contextualized understanding of Christianity.

== Text ==
We believe in the one High God of love who created the beautiful world and everything good in it. He created man and wanted man to be happy in the world. God loves the world and every nation and tribe in the world. We have known this God in darkness, and we now know God in the light. God promised in his book the Bible that he would save the world and all the nations and tribes.

We believe that God made good on his promise by sending his son, Jesus Christ, a man by the flesh, a Jew by tribe, born poor in a little village, who left his home and was always on safari, doing good, curing people by the power of God, teaching about God and man, showing that the meaning of religion is love. He was rejected by his people, tortured and nailed hands and feet to a cross, and died. He lay buried in the grave, but the hyenas did not touch him, and on the third day he rose from the grave. He ascended to the skies. He is lord.

We believe that all our sins are forgiven through him. All who have faith in him must be sorry about their sins, be baptized in the Holy Spirit of God, live by the rules of love and share the bread together, to announce the good news to others until Jesus comes again. We are waiting for him. He is alive. He lives. This we believe. Amen.
