= Claude Poullart des Places =

French Catholic priest (1679–1709)

Servant of God Claude-François Poullart des Places CSSp
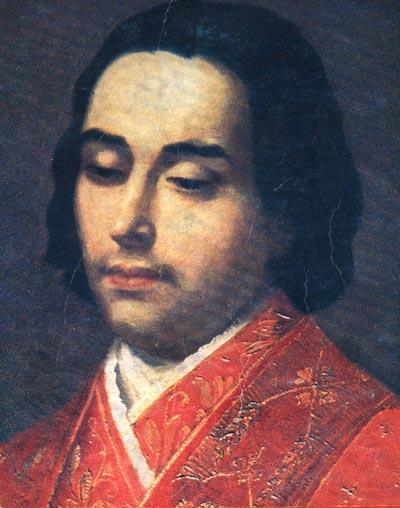
- Des Places after his ordination as a priest
- Born: 26 February 1679; Rennes, France
- Died: 2 October 1709 (aged 30); Paris, France
- Resting place: Church of Saint-Étienne-du-Mont, Paris, France; 48°50′48″N 2°20′53″E
- Known for: Founding the Congregation of the Holy Spirit

Claude-François Poullart des Places, C.S.Sp. (26 February 1679 – 2 October 1709) was a French Catholic priest who founded the Congregation of the Holy Spirit in 1703 at the age of 24. The decree opening his cause of canonization was promulgated on 1 October 1989, but has not yet proceeded to his beatification.

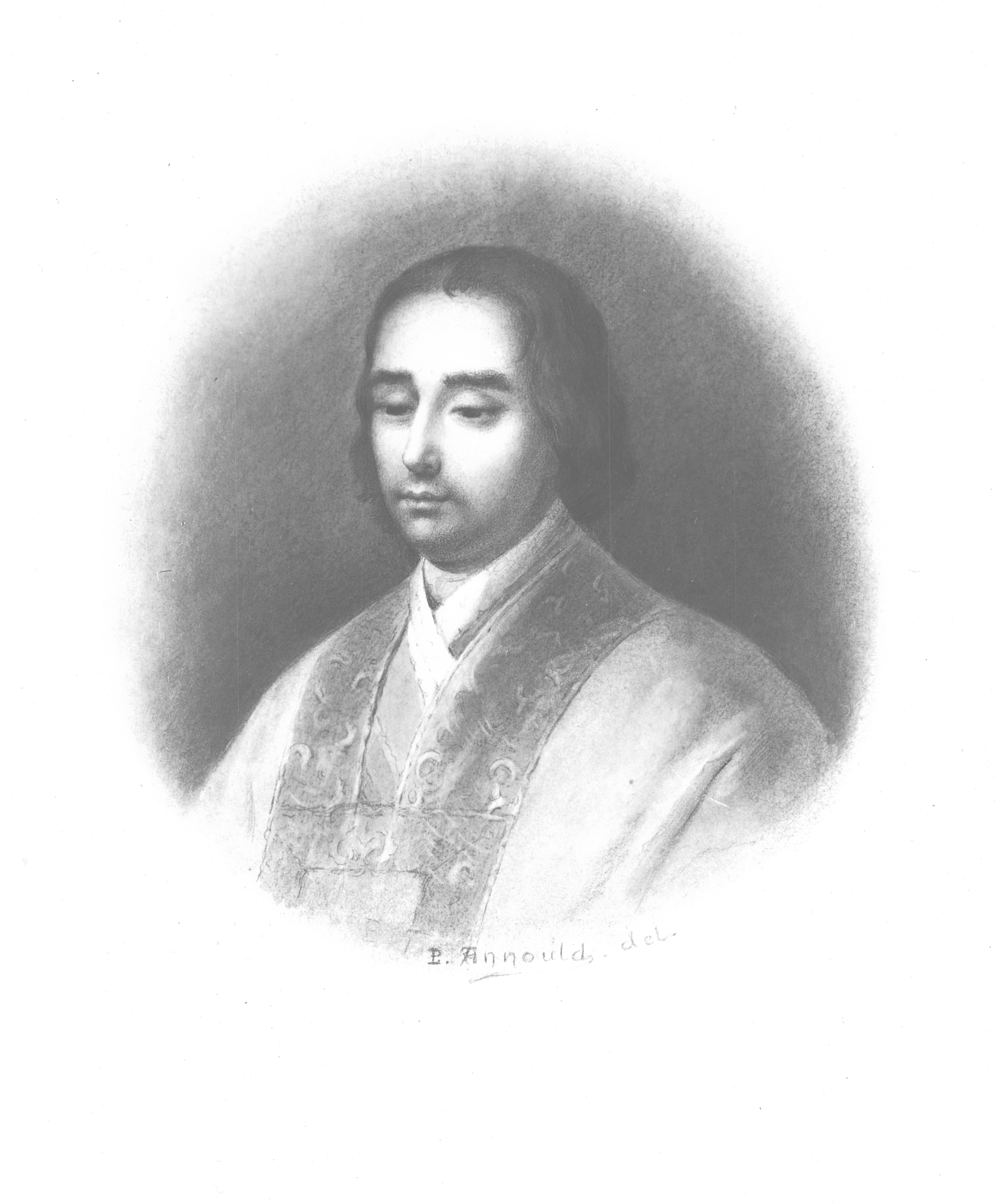
A charcoal drawing of Claude-François Poullart des Places by Pierre-Leon Annould, from a print held by the Center for Spiritan Studies at Duquesne University in Pittsburgh.

== Biography ==
=== Early life ===
Claude des Places, was born on 26 February 1679 in Rennes, France, the son of a French aristocrat, François des Places, and his wife, Jeanne le Meneust. He was baptized the next day. His father was one of the wealthiest businessmen in the city and enjoyed considerable standing in the community as an attorney in the Breton Parliament. Claude's mother also belonged to the aristocracy and, prior to her marriage, served as governess to the family of the President of the Provincial Parliament.

His family moved twice in his childhood. Following a relocation to Saint-Sauveur-en-Rue, des Places entered the Jesuit Collège Saint-Thomas in October 1690. He studied further under the Jesuits at their college in Rennes and Caen from 1693 to 1695. Among his friends was Louis Grignion de Montfort. Des Places led a mischievous adolescence: he once narrowly missed his sister with a shot from their father's revolver—he thought it was unloaded—when she was annoying him as he studied a role for a school play. He was nearly killed himself during a hunting trip, and got into a roadside brawl in Nantes. He was a talented student, however, and was the valedictorian of his class. For his remarkable graduation dissertation he was invited to Versailles as a guest of France's royal family.

=== Religious life ===
Des Places' life began to change when he became aware of the needs of the poor while studying law—he was soon moved to help the homeless boys and chimney sweeps by giving them money from his allowance. Though he graduated with his degree in law from Nantes in 1700, his growing involvement with the poor inspired the young des Places to give up his career. He left the university and entered the Jesuit seminary Lycée Louis-le-Grand in 1701. He received the tonsure on 15 August 1702.

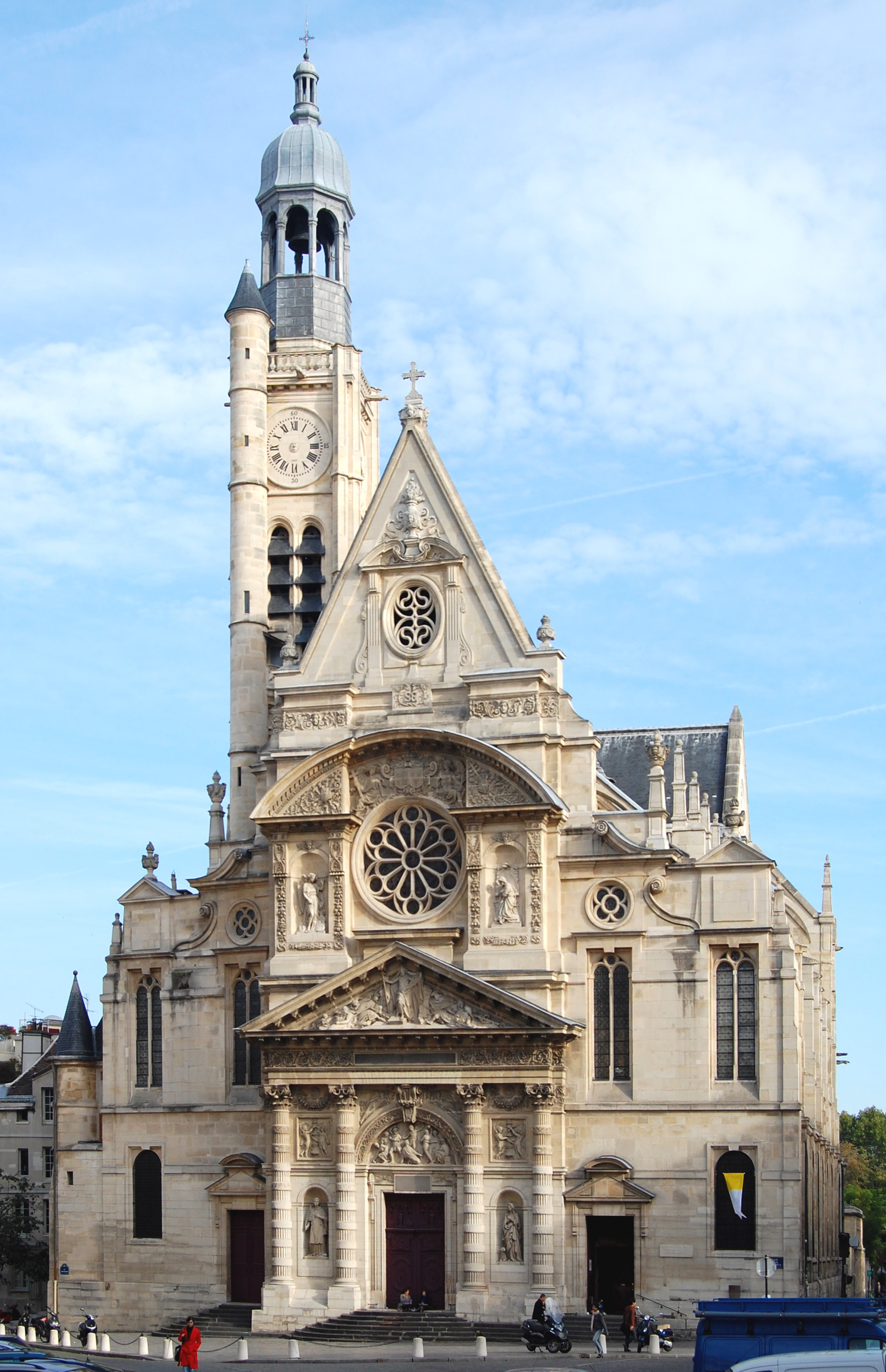
The church of Saint-Étienne-du-Mont in Paris, where des Places was buried in a pauper's grave

Seeing that many of his fellow seminarians were struggling to meet their basic needs, des Places began to support a small group of them financially. Eventually, des Places joined them in the house that he had provided for them. Soon, a dozen of these students asked des Places to set up a formal community, so on Pentecost Sunday (27 May) of 1703, the group met in the Church of Saint Etienne-des-Grès to dedicate themselves to the Holy Spirit, under the special patronage of Mary. The society, which founded a new seminary—the Seminary of the Holy Spirit— had two aims: to support students on their way to the priesthood, and to serve the poor of rural France and in missions overseas. The formation process of the new society was uniquely modelled after that of religious institutes, rather than on that of clerical seminaries.

Des Places received minor orders on 6 June 1705, the same year his community moved to Rue Neuve-Saint-Étienne-du-Mont (Rue Rollin); he was ordained to the subdeaconate on 18 December 1706, and a deacon on 19 March 1707. On 17 December 1707, des Places was ordained at the age of 28. Two years later, Claude died of pleurisy at the age of 30 in 1709.

== Veneration ==
The decree for the cause for his canonization was promulgated on 1 October 1989. Further progress was made in 2005, when the postulator of des Place's cause presented the results of the diocesan inquiry to Rome. A decree of validity was signed on 24 May 2008. A decree of recognition of the heroic nature of des Place's virtues is expected.

== Selected bibliography ==
- De Mare, Christian (1998). Aux racines de l'arbre spiritain (in French). Paris: Congrégation du Saint-Esprit. p. 422.
- Eschbach, Alphonse (1916). La vie et l'œuvre de Claude-François Poullart des Places: fondateur de la Société du Saint-Esprit (in French). Rome: Via Santa Chiara. p. 126.
- Jacquot, Émile (1998). Biografia de Cláudio Poullart des Places: fundador da Congregação do Espírito Santo (in Portuguese). Lisbon: Missionários do Espírito Santo. p. 15.
- Savoie, Jean (2008). Prier 15 jours avec Claude-François Poullart des Places (in French). Paris: Nouvelle Cite. p. 125.
- Seixas, Joaquín Ramos (1992). Claudio Poullart des Places (in Spanish). Madrid: Congregación del Espíritu Santo. p. 382.
- Troy, Michael J. (2005). Riches to rags: Claude Francis Poullart des Places. Toronto: Spiritans. p. 102.

Preceded by —	Superior General of the Congregation of the Holy Spirit; 1703–1709	Succeeded by Jacques Garnier
