= Alexandre Monnet =

French bishop of the Roman Catholic Church

His Excellency, The Most Reverend Alexandre-Hippolyte-Xavier Monnet C.S.Sp.
- Vicar Apostolic of Madagascar
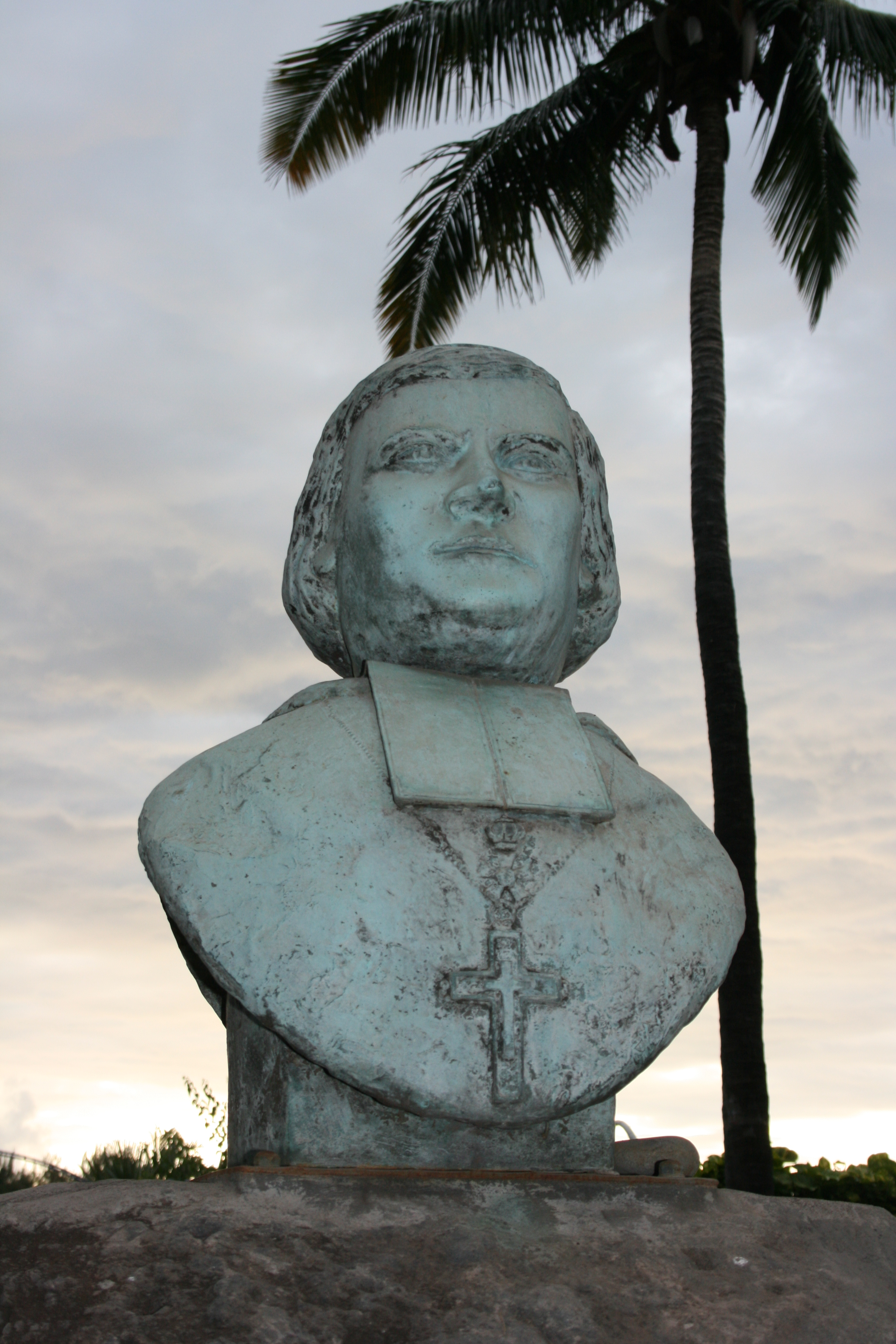
- Bust of Alexandre Monnet
- Church: Catholic Church
- See: Apostolic Vicariate of Madagascar
- In office: 30 September 1848 – 1 December 1849
- Predecessor: Pierre Dalmond
- Successor: Jean-Baptiste Cazet
- Other posts: Titular Bishop of Pella (1848-1849); Superior General of Congregation of the Holy Spirit (1848-1849)

Orders
- Ordination: 1837
- Consecration: 5 November 1848 by Pierre Giraud (cardinal)

Personal details
- Born: 4 January 1812 Mouchin, Nord, French Empire
- Died: 1 December 1849 (aged 37)

Alexandre-Hippolyte-Xavier Monnet, C.S.Sp. (4 January 1812 – 1 December 1849) was a French Catholic prelate and abolitionist who served as Apostolic Vicar of Madagascar from 1848 until his death. He was previously superior general of the Congregation of the Holy Spirit.

== Biography ==
Alexandre Monnet was born on 4 January 1812 in Mouchin, France. In 1837, at the age of 25, he was ordained a priest in the Congregation of the Holy Spirit.

As a missionary on the island of Réunion, Monnet took a radical stance against slavery, arguing that moral and religious instruction was impossible for the enslaved without immediate emancipation. Local plantation owners, enraged by his advocacy and terrified of a rebellion, attempted to kill him, but he was physically protected by the slaves themselves. After Monnet returned from a brief trip to Europe in September 1847, white colonists staged violent riots targeting him. To appease the wealthy settlers, the island's governor exiled Monnet just two weeks later "in the colony's best interests". He became a key advisor and close collaborator to Victor Schœlcher, the statesman who officially drafted France's 1848 decree abolishing slavery.

On 2 March 1848, Monnet was appointed superior general of the Spiritans, a post from which he would resign on 3 October 1848. He was appointed Vicar Apostolic of Madagascar, with a titular bishopric (Pella), on 3 October 1848, a post to which he was consecrated on 5 November. He died on 1 December 1849, at the age of 37.

Catholic Church titles
Preceded by Alexandre Leguay	Superior General of the Congregation of the Holy Spirit; 1848–1848	Succeeded by Francis Libermann
Preceded by –	Vicar Apostolic of Madagascar; 1848–1849	Succeeded by –
