= Heilig-Geist-Gymnasium =

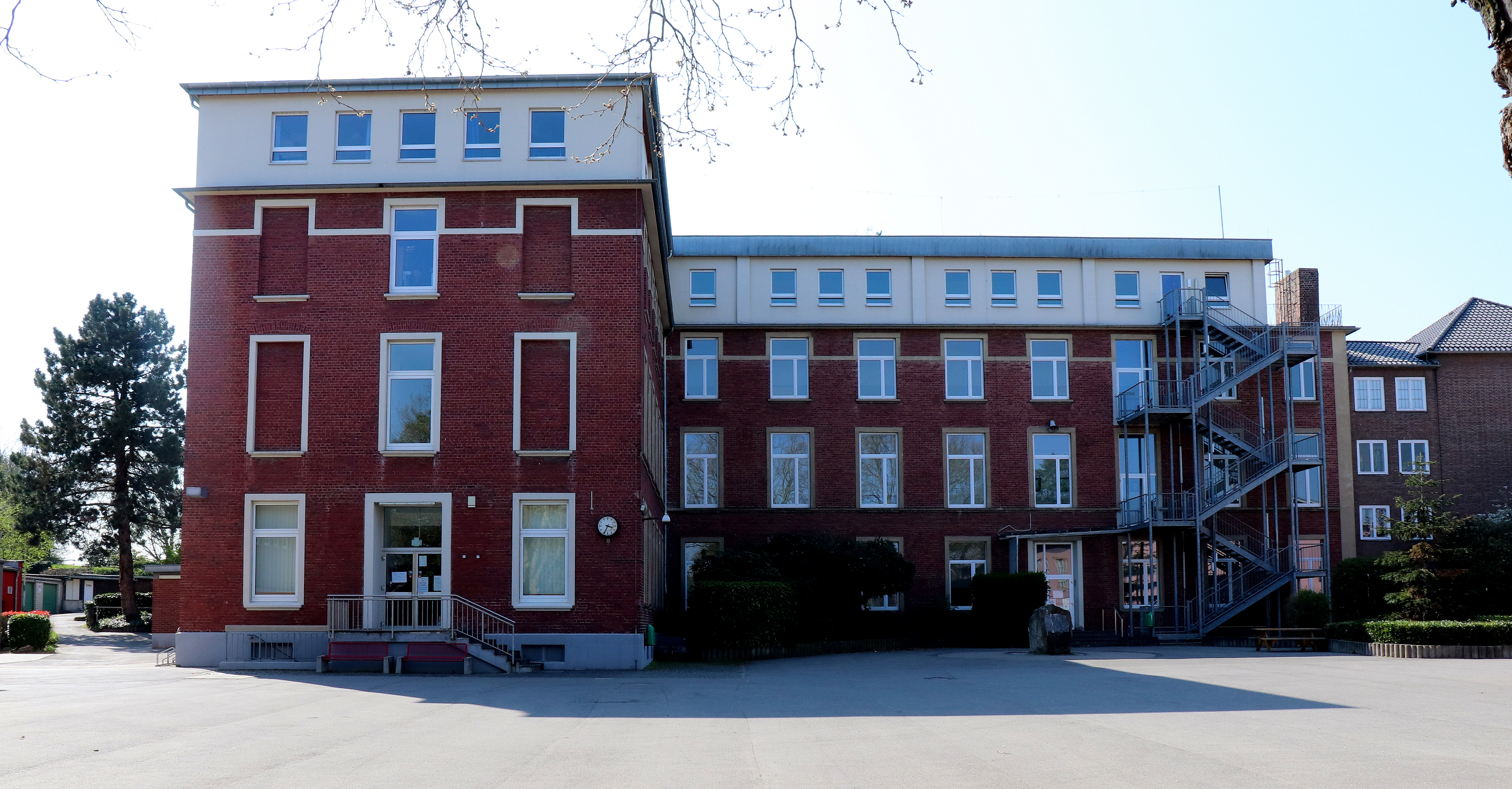
- Heilig-Geist-Gymnasium, pictured in 2020

Location
- Broich, Würselen; Germany; 50°50′37″N 6°10′28″E

Information
- Type: Christian secondary school
- Religious affiliation: Non-denominational
- Principal: Christoph Barbier
- Website: www.hgg-broich.de

Heilig-Geist-Gymnasium is a Christian secondary school located in Broich in Würselen, Germany.

== Roman canal ==
On September 12, 2019, the Heilig-Geist-Gymnasium received a section of an ancient Roman water conduit. This pipe, which is almost two millennia old, was found during excavation work near Cologne and was then restored by trainees from the Chamber of Crafts and divided into 22 parts.

The section of the former water conduit is now located in the schoolyard of the Gymnasium. The entire project was subsidized by the Landschaftsverband Rheinland.

The canal is supervised by the school's archaeology AG.

== See also ==
- Städtisches Gymnasium an der Hönne, formerly known as Heilig-Geist-Gymnasium (Menden)
- Holy Ghost Fathers
