= Creed =

Statement of belief

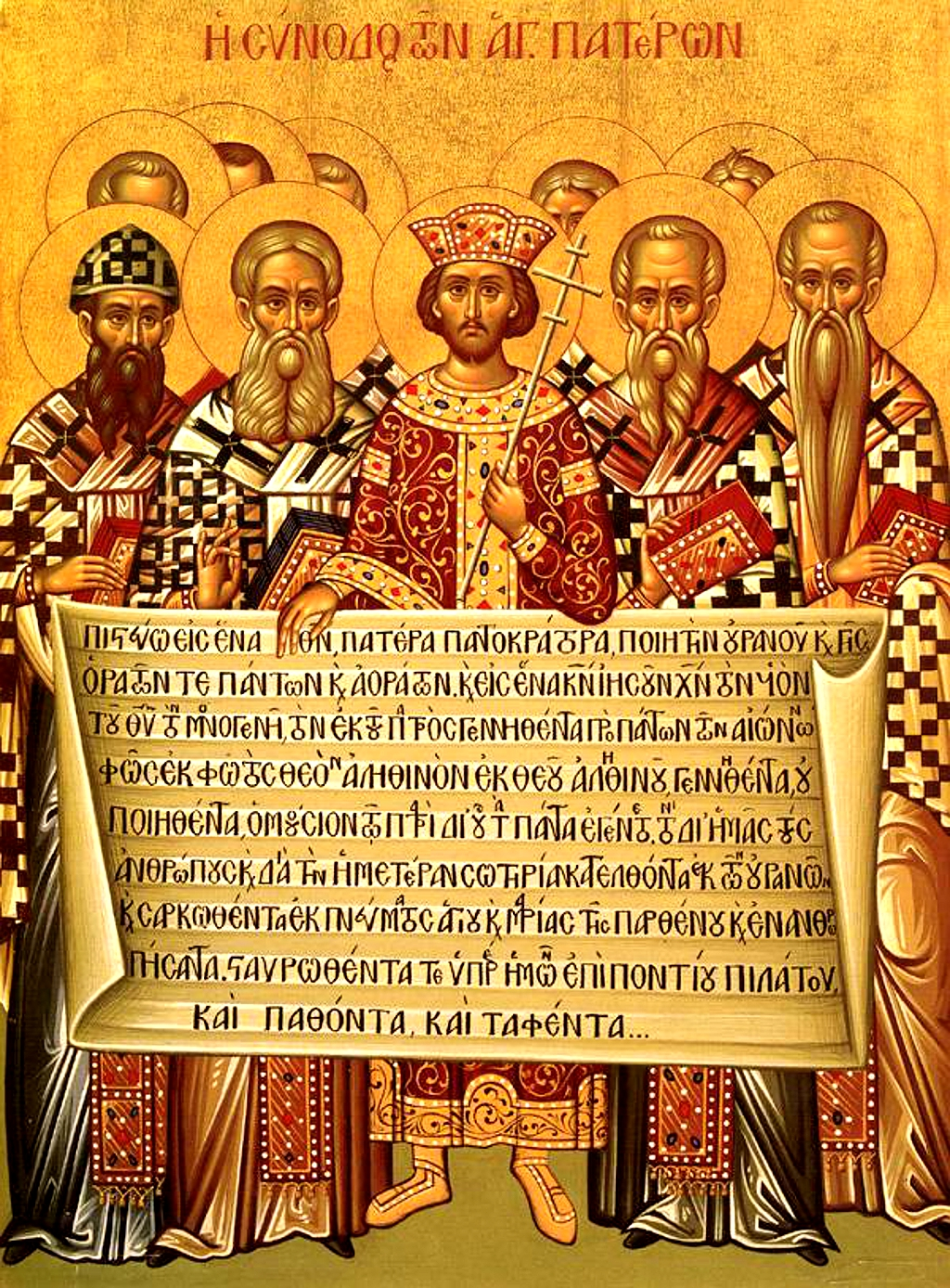
Icon depicting Emperor Constantine (center) and the Fathers of the First Council of Nicaea (325) as holding the Niceno-Constantinopolitan Creed of 381

A creed, also known as a confession of faith, a symbol, or a statement of faith, is a statement of the shared beliefs of a community (often a religious community) which summarizes its core tenets.

Many Christian denominations use three creeds: the Niceno-Constantinopolitan Creed, the Apostles' Creed and the Athanasian Creed. Some Christian denominations do not use any of those creeds.

The term creed is sometimes extended to comparable concepts in non-Christian theologies. The Islamic concept of ʿaqīdah (literally "bond, tie") is often rendered as "creed".

== History ==
The earliest known creed in Christianity, "Jesus is Lord", originated in the writings of Paul the Apostle. One of the most significant and widely used Christian creeds is the Nicene Creed, first formulated in AD 325 at the First Council of Nicaea to affirm the deity of Christ and revised at the First Council of Constantinople in AD 381 to affirm the trinity as a whole. The creed was further affirmed in 431 by the Chalcedonian Definition, which clarified the doctrine of Christ. Affirmation of this creed, which describes the Trinity, is often taken as a fundamental test of orthodoxy by many Christian denominations, and was historically purposed against Arianism. The Apostles' Creed, another early creed which concisely details the trinity, virgin birth, crucifixion, and resurrection, is most popular within western Christianity, and is widely used in Christian church services.

In Islamic theology, the term most closely corresponding to "creed" is ʿaqīdah (عقيدة).

== Terminology ==
The word creed is particularly used for a concise statement which is recited as part of liturgy. The term is anglicized from Latin credo "I believe", the incipit of the Latin texts of the Apostles' Creed and the Nicene Creed. A creed is sometimes referred to as a symbol in a specialized meaning of that word (which was first introduced to Late Middle English in this sense), after Latin symbolum "creed" (as in Symbolum Apostolorum = the "Apostles' Creed", a shorter version of the traditional Nicene Creed), after Greek symbolon "token, watchword".

Some longer statements of faith in the Protestant tradition are instead called "confessions of faith", or simply "confession" (as in e.g. Helvetic Confession). Within Evangelical Protestantism, the terms "doctrinal statement" or "doctrinal basis" tend to be preferred. Doctrinal statements may include positions on lectionary and translations of the Bible, particularly in fundamentalist churches of the King James Only movement.

== Christianity ==
The first confession of faith established within Christianity was the Nicene Creed by the Early Church in 325. It was established to summarize the foundations of the Christian faith and to protect believers from false doctrines. Various Christian denominations from Protestantism and Evangelical Christianity have published confession of faith as a basis for fellowship among churches of the same denomination.

Many Christian denominations did not try to be too exhaustive in their confessions of faith and thus allow different opinions on some secondary topics. In addition, some churches are open to revising their confession of faith when necessary. Moreover, Baptist "confessions of faith" have often had a clause such as this from the First London Baptist Confession (Revised edition, 1646):

Also we confess that we now know but in part and that are ignorant of many things which we desire to and seek to know: and if any shall do us that friendly part to show us from the Word of God that we see not, we shall have cause to be thankful to God and to them.

=== Excommunication ===
Excommunication is a practice of the Bible to exclude members who do not respect the Church's confession of faith and do not want to repent. It is practiced by most Christian denominations and is intended to protect against the consequences of heretics' teachings and apostasy.

=== Christians without creeds ===
Some Christian denominations do not profess a creed. This stance is often referred to as "non-creedalism".

Anabaptism, with its origins in the 16th century Radical Reformation, spawned a number of sects and denominations that espouse "No creed, but the Bible/New Testament". This was a common reason for Anabaptist persecution from Catholic and Protestant believers. Anabaptist groups that exist today include the Amish, Hutterites, Mennonites, Schwarzenau Brethren (Church of the Brethren), River Brethren, Bruderhof, and the Apostolic Christian Church.

The Religious Society of Friends, the group known as the Quakers, was founded in the 17th century and is similarly non-creedal. They believe that such formal structures, “be they written words, steeple-houses or a clerical hierarchy,” cannot take the place of communal relationships and a shared connection with God.

Similar reservations about the use of creeds can be found in the Restoration Movement and its descendants, the Christian Church (Disciples of Christ), the Churches of Christ, and the Christian churches and churches of Christ. Restorationists profess "no creed but Christ".

The Seventh-day Adventist Church also shares this sentiment.

Jehovah's Witnesses contrast "memorizing or repeating creeds" with acting to "do what Jesus said".

Within the sects of the Latter Day Saint movement, mainstream creeds are not used, like other Restorationists. However it does use the Articles of Faith, contained in a list which was composed by Joseph Smith as part of an 1842 letter which he sent to John Wentworth, editor of the Chicago Democrat. It is canonized along with the King James Version of the Bible, the Book of Mormon, the Doctrine & Covenants and the Pearl of Great Price, as a part of the standard works of the Church of Jesus Christ of Latter-day Saints.

=== Christian creeds ===
Several creeds originated in Christianity.

- 1 Corinthians 15:3–7 includes an early creed about Jesus' death and resurrection which was probably received by Paul. The antiquity of the creed has been located by most biblical scholars to no more than five years after Jesus' death, probably originating from the Jerusalem apostolic community.
- The Old Roman Creed is an earlier and shorter version of the Apostles' Creed. It was based on the 2nd century Rules of Faith and the interrogatory declaration of faith for those receiving baptism, which by the 4th century was everywhere tripartite in structure, following Matthew 28:19.
- The Apostles' Creed is used in Western Christianity for both liturgical and catechetical purposes.
- The Nicene Creed reflects the concerns of the First Council of Nicaea in 325 which had as their chief purpose to establish what Christians believed.
- The Chalcedonian Creed was adopted at the Council of Chalcedon in 451 in Asia Minor. It defines that Christ is 'acknowledged in two natures', which 'come together into one person and hypostasis'.
- The Athanasian Creed (Quicunque vult) is a Christian statement of belief focusing on Trinitarian doctrine and Christology. It is the first creed in which the equality of the three persons of the Trinity is explicitly stated and differs from the Nicene and Apostles' Creeds in the inclusion of anathemas, or condemnations of those who disagree with the Creed.
- The Tridentine Creed was initially contained in the papal bull Iniunctum nobis, issued by Pope Pius IV on 13 November 1565. The creed was intended to summarise the teaching of the Council of Trent (1545–1563).
- The Maasai Creed is a creed composed in 1960 by the Maasai people of East Africa in collaboration with missionaries from the Congregation of the Holy Ghost. The creed attempts to express the essentials of the Christian faith within the Maasai culture.
- The Credo of the People of God is a confession of faith that Pope Paul VI published with the motu proprio Solemni hac liturgia of 30 June 1968. Pope Paul VI spoke of it as "a creed which, without being strictly speaking a dogmatic definition, repeats in substance, with some developments called for by the spiritual condition of our time, the creed of Nicea, the creed of the immortal tradition of the holy Church of God."

=== Christian confessions of faith ===
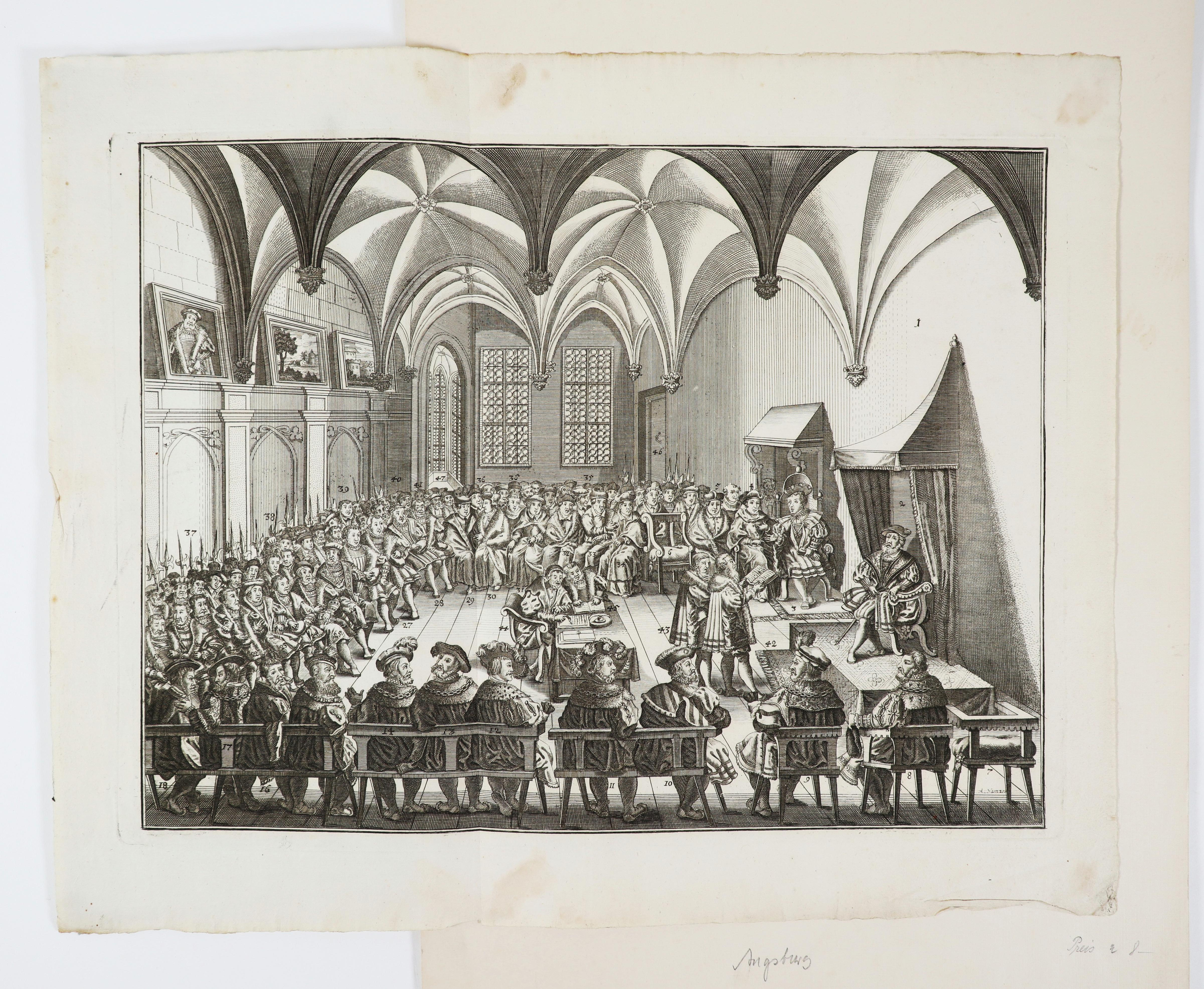
Charles V, Holy Roman Emperor receives the Augsburg Confession at the Diet of Augsburg on 25 June 1530

Protestant denominations are usually associated with confessions of faith, which are similar to creeds but usually longer.

- The Sixty-seven Articles of the Swiss reformers, drawn up by Zwingli in 1523
- The Schleitheim Confession of the Anabaptist Swiss Brethren in 1527
- The Augsburg Confession of 1530, the work of Martin Luther and Philip Melanchthon, which marked the breach with Rome
- The Tetrapolitan Confession of the German Reformed Church, 1530
- The Smalcald Articles of Martin Luther, 1537
- The Guanabara Confession of Faith, 1558
- The Gallic Confession, 1559
- The Scots Confession, drawn up by John Knox in 1560
- The Belgic Confession drawn up by Guido de Bres in 1561
- The Thirty-nine Articles of the Church of England in 1562
- The Formula of Concord and its Epitome in 1577
- The Helwys Confession in 1611
- The Irish Articles in 1615
- The Remonstrant Confession in 1621
- The Dordrecht Confession of Faith of Dutch Mennonites in 1632
- The First London Confession of Particular Baptists in 1644
- The Westminster Confession of Faith in 1647 was the work of the Westminster Assembly of Divines and has commended itself to the Presbyterian Churches of all English-speaking peoples, and also in other languages.
- The Savoy Declaration of 1658 which was a modification of the Westminster Confession to suit Congregationalist polity
- The Standard Confession of General Baptists in 1660
- A Catechism and Confession of Faith in 1673 upheld by the Religious Society of Friends (Quakers)
- The Orthodox Creed of General Baptists in 1679
- The Second London Confession for all Particular and Reformed Baptists in 1689
- The Confession of Faith of the Calvinistic Methodists (Presbyterians) of Wales of 1823
- The New Hampshire Confession of Baptists in 1833
- The Chicago-Lambeth Quadrilateral of the Anglican Communion in 1870
- The Richmond Declaration in 1887, upheld by Orthodox Gurneyite Quakers
- The Assemblies of God Statement of Fundamental Truths in 1916
- The Articles of Religion and Confession of Faith of the United Methodist Church, adopted in 1968

=== Controversies ===
In the Swiss Reformed Churches, there was a quarrel about the Apostles' Creed in the mid-19th century. As a result, most cantonal reformed churches stopped prescribing any particular creed.

In 2005, Bishop John Shelby Spong, retired Episcopal Bishop of Newark, has written that dogmas and creeds were merely "a stage in our development" and "part of our religious childhood." In his book, Sins of the Scripture, Spong wrote that "Jesus seemed to understand that no one can finally fit the holy God into his or her creeds or doctrines. That is idolatry."

== In Islam (aqīdah) ==
In Islamic theology, the term most closely corresponding to "creed" is ʿaqīdah (عقيدة). The first such creed, written as "a short answer to the pressing heresies of the time", is known as Al-Fiqh Al-Akbar and ascribed to Abū Ḥanīfa. Two well known creeds were the Fiqh Akbar II "representative" of the al-Ash'ari, and Fiqh Akbar III, "representative" of the Ash-Shafi'i.

Iman (Arabic: الإيمان) in Islamic theology denotes a believer's religious faith. Its most simple definition is the belief in the six pilars of faith, known as arkān al-īmān.

1. Belief in God
2. Belief in the Angels
3. Belief in Divine Books
4. Belief in the Prophets
5. Belief in the Day of Judgement
6. Belief in God's predestination

== Similarly in other Religions like Jewish Shema Yisrael ==
Rabbi Milton Steinberg wrote that "By its nature Judaism is averse to formal creeds which of necessity limit and restrain thought" and asserted in his book Basic Judaism (1947) that "Judaism has never arrived at a creed." The 1976 Centenary Platform of the Central Conference of American Rabbis, an organization of Reform rabbis, agrees that "Judaism emphasizes action rather than creed as the primary expression of a religious life."

A notable statement of Jewish principles of faith was drawn up by Maimonides as his 13 Principles of Faith.

== Religions without creeds ==
Following a debate that lasted more than twenty years, the National Conference of the American Unitarian Association passed a resolution in 1894 that established the denomination as non-creedal. The Unitarians later merged with the Universalist Church of America to form the Unitarian Universalist Association (UUA). Instead of a creed, the UUA abides by a set of principles, such as “a free and responsible search for truth and meaning”. It cites diverse sources of inspiration, including Christianity, Judaism, Humanism, and Earth-centered traditions.

== See also ==
- Covenant
- Credo
- Mission statement
- The American's Creed – a 1917 statement about Americans' belief in democracy
- The Five Ks
- Pesher
- Assassin's Creed
