= Claude Bernard (priest) =

French Roman Catholic priest

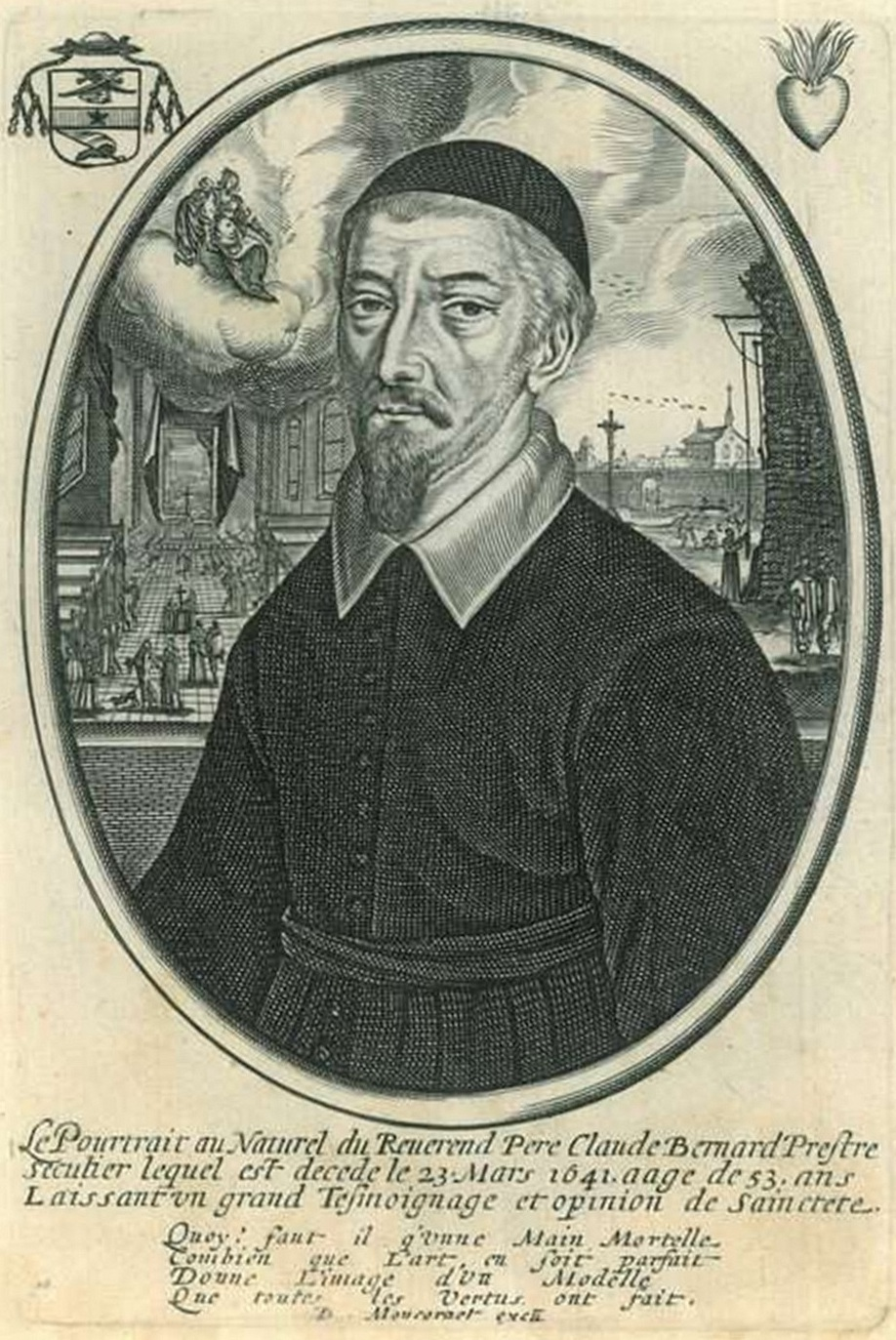
Père Claude Bernard

Father Claude Bernard (December 23, 1588 – March 23, 1641) was a French Roman Catholic priest who was active in ministry to prisoners and criminals, especially those condemned to death. Known as "le pauvre prêtre" ("the poor priest"), he is primarily remembered as the popularizer of the Memorare, over 200,000 copies of which he distributed by leaflets printed in various languages.

== Life ==
Claude Bernard was born at Dijon 23 December 1588. His father was a distinguished lawyer, and filled successively offices of honour and responsibility. Young Bernard was educated at the Jesuit College of Dole and was remarked for his brilliant imagination and wit. Pierre Le Camus, Bishop of Belley, urged him to enter the priesthood, but he declined, saying that he preferred the life of a poor gentleman to that of a poor priest. Shortly afterwards he went to Paris as a protégé of M. de Bellegarde, Governor of Bourgogne. For a while the social life of the capital attracted him; gradually, however, some disappointments together with the death of an intimate friend who was killed in a duel, brought about a decided change in his mode of life and led up to his entrance into the priesthood. By one account, he had a dream of his late father warning him against the worldliness to which he was addicted.

He was ordained by the above-mentioned Bishop Le Camus and invited to his first Mass the poor of the city, distributing to them all his possessions, and, later on, an inheritance of 400,000 livres, or about eighty thousand dollars. The poor, the sick and the prisoners were his special care. Wealthy and distinguished persons sought his company, and contributed to his charities. He was friends with Jean-Jacques Olier and Vincent de Paul. He founded at Paris, for the education of the poor candidates for the priesthood, the seminary of Trent-Trois.

He contributed much to popularize the beautiful prayer to the Blessed Virgin known as the Memorare, and claimed in a letter to Queen Anne, wife of King Louis XIII, that he had himself been miraculously cured of illness through intercession of the Blessed Virgin Mary as a result of his reciting the prayer.

Father Bernard died in Paris, 23 March 1641.

He was the subject of a 1913 biography in French, Claude Bernard dit le pauvre prêtre by Commandeur de Broqua, who was the postulator for the cause of Fr. Bernard's canonization.
