= Congregation of the Holy Spirit =

Roman Catholic congregation of priests, lay brothers, and lay associates

- Latin: Congregatio Sancti Spiritus
- The seal of the Congregation depicting the Immaculate Heart of Mary, and the Holy Spirit proceeding from the Trinity.
- Abbreviation: CSSp
- Nickname: Spiritan
- Formation: 27 May 1703; 323 years ago
- Founder: Claude-François Poullart des Places, CSSp
- Founded at: Paris, France
- Type: Clerical Religious Congregation of Pontifical Right for Men
- Headquarters: Casa Generalizia, Clivo di Cinna, 195, Rome, Italy
- Region served: Europe, North America, Australia, the Indian Ocean and Africa.
- Members: 2,794 members (2,109 priests) as of 2018
- Motto: Latin: Cor unum et anima una English: One heart and one spirit
- Superior General: Alain Mayama, CSSp
- Affiliations: Roman Catholic Church
- Website: www.spiritanroma.org

The Congregation of the Holy Spirit (officially the Congregation of the Holy Spirit under the protection of the Immaculate Heart of the Virgin Mary; Latin: Congregatio Sancti Spiritus sub tutela Immaculati Cordis Beatissimae Virginis Mariae) is a religious congregation for men in the Catholic Church. Members are often known as Holy Ghost Fathers or, in continental Europe and the Anglosphere, as Spiritans, and members use the postnominals CSSp.

== History ==
=== Claude Poullart des Places ===
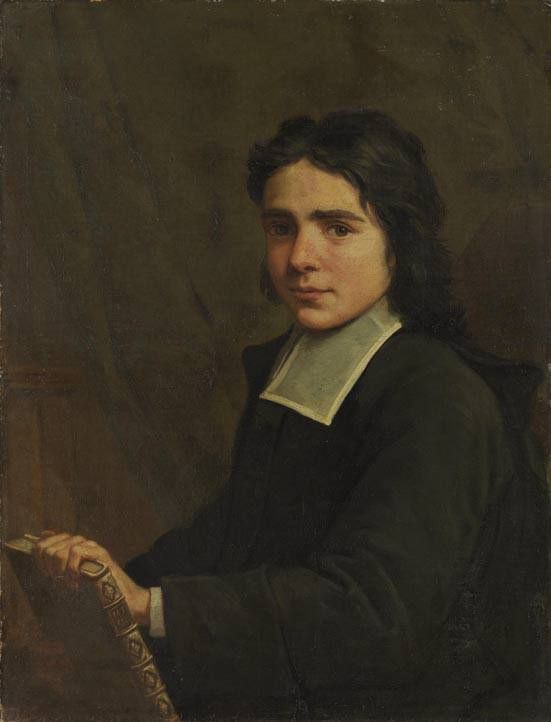
Claude Poullart des Places founded the Congregation of the Holy Spirit on Whit Sunday 1703.

Claude Poullart des Places was born on 26 February 1679, in Rennes, the capital city of Brittany, France. He was the eldest child and only son of Francis des Places and Jeanne le Meneust. Claude was tutored at home before being enrolled at the age of nine or ten as a day student in the nearby Jesuit College of St. Thomas, thus beginning his lifelong association with the Society of Jesus. Graduating at 16, Claude studied at the University of Caen, Normandy, before graduating at 22 with a Licentiate in Law from the Law School of Nantes.

In 1701 Claude Poullart began his studies for the priesthood, as a boarder at the Jesuit College in Paris. However, he soon left his college room to share lodgings with the poorer day students who often struggled to find food, lodgings, and facilities for their studies. With a dozen of such students, Poullart des Places opened the Seminary of the Holy Spirit. It gradually developed into a religious society.

=== Foundation ===
The Spiritans were founded in Paris on Whit Sunday (Pentecost), 1703. Having opted for the priesthood, Claude Poullart des Places wanted to form a religious institute for young men who had vocations to become priests but were too poor to do so. He became especially interested in such students, and supported them with his own funds and donations from friends. In 1707 Poullart was ordained a priest. His work grew rapidly; and the foundation developed. But Poullart developed pleurisy and died on 2 October 1709, at age thirty-one.

After the founder's death, the Congregation of the Holy Spirit continued to progress. It became fully organized, and received the approbation of civil and ecclesiastical authorities. Formed in dedication to the Holy Spirit to minister to the poor and to provide chaplains in hospitals, prisons, and schools, the community soon developed a missionary role: some volunteered for service in the Far East and North America.

In 1765 the Holy See entrusted it with direct care of South American missions, in colonies such as French Guiana. Spiritans also sent missionaries to China, Cambodia, Vietnam, Thailand (Siam), and India under the auspices of the Paris Foreign Missions Society. In 1779 the first Spiritan missionaries arrived in Senegal, Africa.

Those in France served in various dioceses or alongside the de Montfort missionaries, due to the close friendship between Poullart and Louis de Montfort. The Congregation had trained 1,300 priests in the years leading up to 1792, when the seminary was suppressed by the French Revolution. Some Spiritans sought refuge in England, Switzerland, and Italy.

=== Merger ===
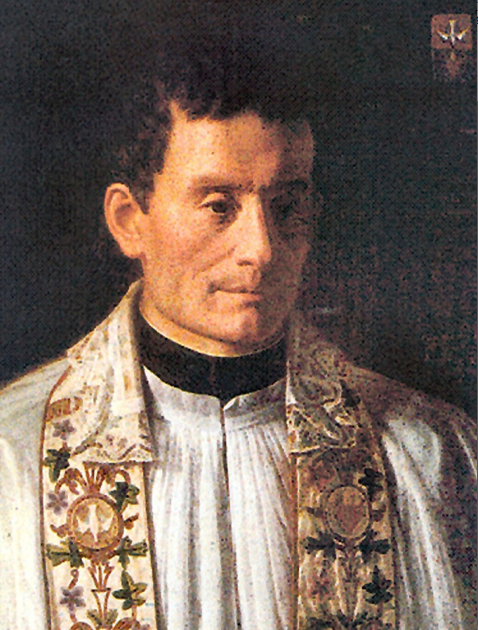
Venerable Francis Libermann, often called the Congregation's "second founder", was also its eleventh superior general (1848–1852).

After the French Revolution, only one member, James Bertout, remained. He had survived miraculously, through a series of vicissitudes – shipwreck on the way to his destined mission in French Guiana, enslavement by the Moors, and a sojourn in Senegal, where he had been sold to the English, who then ruled there. On his return to France, after peace was restored to the Church, he re-established the congregation and continued its work. But it was found impossible to recover adequately from the disastrous effects of the dispersion caused by the Revolution, and the restored society was threatened with extinction.

The congregation's numbers in Europe declined sharply until 1802, when the Napoleonic government allowed the seminary to reopen. The congregation was asked to supply missionary priests for work in the French colonies in Africa, the West Indies, and the Indian subcontinent. In 1824, Rome approved the Rules of the Congregation of the Holy Spirit; prior to that it had been a diocesan congregation.

In 1842, Francis Libermann had founded the "Society of the Holy Heart of Mary," a society dedicated to serve mainly the emancipated black slaves in the French colonies. The taking-up of the African missions by Libermann was due to the initiative of two American prelates, under the encouragement of the first Council of Baltimore. Already in 1833, John England, Bishop of Charleston, had drawn attention to the West Coast of Africa, and had urged sending missioners to those regions. This appeal was renewed at the Council of Baltimore, and the assembled fathers commissioned Edward Barron to undertake missionary work at Cape Palmas. Barron went over the ground carefully for a few years, and then repaired to Rome to give an account of the work, and to receive further instructions. He was consecrated bishop and appointed Vicar-Apostolic of the Two Guineas. But as he had only one priest and a catechist at his disposal, he went to France to recruit missioners. Libermann supplied him at once with seven priests and three coadjutor brothers. By 1844, five members of this first group had died, either in Africa or at sea. The first missionaries suffered high mortality from tropical diseases; all but one died within a few months.

Discouraged, Barron returned to America, where he devoted himself to missionary work. He died during the 1853 yellow fever epidemic in Savannah, Georgia, aged 52.

In 1848, the Holy See requested Libermann to merge the relatively new Society of the Holy Heart of Mary with the older Congregation of the Holy Spirit, as they shared missions. Libermann was made first superior general of the united societies; he is credited with renewing the Congregation of the Holy Spirit, whose name became known as "... under the protection of the Immaculate Heart of Mary", reflecting the merger.

The new superior general first concentrated on strengthening service to the old French colonies. He developed bishoprics and provided for the supply of clergy through the Seminary of the Holy Ghost. His disciples worked largely in Africa. Libermann recruited and educated missionaries, both lay and clerical. He negotiated with Rome and with the French government over the placement and support of his personnel.

Father Libermann and his associates retained the African mission; gradually they established new Christian communities on the continent. By 1913, nearly 700 missionaries had died while serving in Africa. Their work resulted in establishing the Diocese of Angola and the eight Vicariates of Senegambia, Sierra Leone, Gabon, Ubangi (or French Upper Congo), Loango (or French Lower Congo), on the West Coast, and Northern Madagascar, Zanzibar, Bagamoyo, on the East Coast. Prefectures were developed in Lower Nigeria, French Guinea, Lower Congo (Landana), and a mission at Bata in Spanish West Africa.

Besides the missions in Africa, the Congregation of the Holy Spirit started missions in Mauritius, Réunion, and the Rodriguez Islands. In the Western Hemisphere, they had missions in Trinidad, Martinique, Guadeloupe, Haiti, and Amazonia. In addition, they conducted such educational institutions as the French Seminary at Rome, the colonial seminary at Paris, the colleges of Blackrock, Rockwell College, and St Mary's in Rathmines in Ireland, St Michael's College, Dublin, Saint Mary's College, Trinidad and Tobago, the Holy Ghost College of Pittsburgh (now Duquesne University), Pennsylvania, and the three colleges of Braga, Porto, and Lisbon in Portugal.

=== 20th century ===
By the early 20th century the congregation was organized into the following provinces: France, Ireland, Portugal, United States, and Germany. The whole society was under the jurisdiction of the Cardinal Prefect of the Propaganda. Houses have been opened in England, Canada, Belgium, and the Netherlands, intended to develop into distinct provinces, so as to supply the colonies of these respective countries with an increase of missionaries.

On 31 December 1961 twenty Spiritans: nineteen Belgians and one Dutch man, were killed in Kongolo, in what is now the Democratic Republic of the Congo, by government troops during the Katanga secession rebellion.

In Rome, on 24 April 1979, Pope John Paul II presided over the beatification ceremony for Jacques-Désiré Laval, the first member of the Spiritans to be so honoured.

=== Today ===
The Spiritans' goal is always to establish a viable local faith community with its own leadership, while incorporating the language and customs of the people. Spiritans live in community and practice the evangelical counsels. The congregation's international headquarters is in Rome. The 2019 General Chapter was held in Tanzania. As of 2019, more than 2,800 Spiritans served in 62 countries on five continents. They are often associated with schools and chaplaincy, and missionary work.

Some noted English-speaking Spiritans in the late 20th-century include Fathers Vincent J. Donovan, Adrian Van Kaam, and Henry J. Koren. Father Donovan (1926–2000) wrote Christianity Rediscovered. He worked in Tanzania, most notably among the Maasai, from 1955 to 1973. During this period, the Maasai Creed was composed, with support from the Spiritans as a culturally relevant creed. Father Van Kaam was notable for his work in psychology and spirituality. He also wrote a key work on Venerable Father Libermann, one of the Spiritans' founders. Father Koren was a historian of the Congregation and a philosopher.

In other countries, such as Mexico, the Spiritans were invited by local Catholic bishops to minister to Catholics in remote areas where there were not enough diocesan priests to serve the growing numbers of faithful.

== Superiors general ==
As of 2022 the Congregation has had twenty-four superiors general since its foundation in 1703:

No.	Name	Years served
1.	Claude Poullart des Places	1703–1709
2.	Jacques Garnier	1709–1710
3.	Louis Bouic	1710–1763
4.	Julien-François Becquet	1763–1788
5.	Jean-Marie Duflos	1788–1805
6.	Jacques Bertout	1805–1832
7.	Amable Fourdinier	1832–1845
8.	Nicolas Warnet	1845–1845
9.	Alexandre Leguay	1845–1848
10.	Alexandre Monnet	1848–1848
11.	Francis Libermann	1848–1852
12.	Ignace Schwindenhammer	1853–1881
13.	Frédéric Le Vavasseur	1881–1882
14.	Ambroise Emonet	1882–1895
15.	Alexandre Le Roy	1896–1926
16.	Louis Le Hunsec	1926–1950
17.	Francis Griffin	1950–1962
18.	Marcel Lefebvre	1962–1968
19.	Joseph Lécuyer	1968–1974
20.	Frans Timmermans	1974–1986
21.	Pierre Haas	1986–1992
22.	Pierre Schouver	1992–2004
23.	Jean-Paul Hoch	2004–2012
24.	John Fogarty	2012–2021
25.	Alain Mayama	since 2021

== Spiritans around the world ==
=== British Province ===
The British Province covers Great Britain, but not Northern Ireland, although a part of the United Kingdom.

The Spiritans came to Britain 200 years after their foundation when the anti-Catholic government in France was starting to close convents and monasteries. In 1903 they rented Prior Park, a mansion near Bath in Somerset as a refuge abroad. In 1907 Castlehead at Grange-over-Sands, Lancashire, opened as a junior seminary. Father John Rimmer from Widnes was the first British Spiritan, having joined in France in 1894. He was appointed as Superior of Castlehead and gradually under his leadership the school flourished and boys were put through their secondary studies before going to France for the novitiate and training for the missionary priesthood. The school was closed in 1978 due to declining vocations.

In 1939, the Spiritans bought a property in Nottinghamshire to act as a senior seminary, but the house was requisitioned to provide a home for a school for partially sighted children who had been evacuated from Sussex during the Second World War. In 1940, 30 seminarians escaped from France aboard a Polish troopship. The refugees from France shared Castlehead for two years with the junior students. Then they moved to Sizergh Castle near Kendal and continued their studies for the priesthood. On average, four new priests were ordained every year and posted to missions in Sierra Leone, Nigeria, and East Africa. When the war ended, the senior students moved into Upton Hall near Newark. Later, as vocations declined, the seminary was sold and the students joined the Missionary Institute in London.

In 1947, a house was acquired in Bickley, Kent, and used as headquarters for the English Province and a centre for late vocations. Ex-servicemen were applying to join and some needed help to complete their studies prior to going to the novitiate. In the early 1990s with elderly missionaries living longer and returning home, the Bickley community centre of Provincial administration was converted to a retirement home. The Administration moved to Northwood. As of 2022 the Provincial office was in Chester, and the Provincial residence in Salford.

In 1956 the Holy Ghost Fathers set up a community at Uddingston on the outskirts of Glasgow, Scotland. In 1970 the Congregation transferred to the Old parish house and church in Carfin, where it continued as of 2022. It was opposite the Carfin Grotto, a place of Catholic pilgrimage which had been established during the 1920s.

After the Second Vatican Council the various missionary societies in England pooled their resources and started the Missionary Institute London (MIL) in 1969. As one of the founding members, the Holy Ghost Fathers closed their center in Willesborough, moving their students to London and opened a community house in Aldenham Grange, near Watford, Hertfordshire.

From the late 1980s there was a decision to concentrate on work with young people, in order to develop strong committed young catholic leaders. The "Just Youth" ministry was established in order to foster these aims. It provides chaplaincy facilities for several high schools in the Salford Diocese and undertakes outreach work in schools throughout the north of England. Since early 2008 Just Youth has been based in Lower Kersal, Salford, at the former Catholic University Chaplaincy, now re-opened as the Spiritan Youth Centre.

From the Salford community has also grown the group of Lay Spiritans. These are married or single Catholics inspired by the Spiritan way of life and wishing to share in it. They bring their professional skills to the various ministries.

In 2001, two Lay Spiritans of the Salford community founded Revive, a voluntary social work agency committed to the long-term support of asylum seekers and refugees. This work, in conjunction with the Roman Catholic Diocese of Salford and the British Red Cross, involved the support of all asylum seekers, including the destitute whose asylum claims had been refused. Revive also had a significant role in the training of student social workers to work with asylum seekers and refugees in partnership with Manchester University, Manchester Metropolitan University, and Salford University. Revive is based in Salford and is considered to be a missionary work of the Congregation, who are its principal funders.

In 2009, a report from Caritas - Social Action highlighted the work of Revive as an example of good practice with asylum seekers and refugees in the Catholic Church in England and Wales. Lay Spiritan involvement in the management of Revive ceased in 2009. As of 2022 the Revive Web site listed a Spiritan priest as manager.

One former Lay Spiritan, Ann-Marie Fell, was the recipient of a Catholic Women of the Year award in 2010 for her work as a prison chaplain.

The UK Spiritan Provincial Philip Marsh CSSp spent much of his time travelling and meeting with the various communities and works of the Province, with a base in Whitefield, Bury, where the small Provincial Residence Community is located.

=== Canada ===
In 1732 the first Spiritan missionaries arrived in North America under Father Louis Bouic, to work among the Miꞌkmaq and Acadians in French Canada. Unfortunately, the settlers and natives of this region were caught in the political and military clash between the French and the British. One of the most famous Spiritans was Pierre Maillard, named "the Apostle of the Micmacs". After arduous learning over eight years, he wrote the first Micmac grammar.

Father Maillard tried to attenuate the savagery of brutal warfare (instigated at times by the French and the British). Many more missionaries, such as John Le Loutre, came but later had to flee with the Micmacs as the British conquered these areas. Maillard himself was captured in Louisbourg and deported to a Boston jail.

In 1791, the British expelled the Spiritans, who were all from France, from Canada. But they continued their apostolate in the islands of Saint Pierre and Miquelon. In 1954, Spiritans from Ireland opened their first mission in English speaking Canada.

- Neil McNeil High School
- Francis Libermann Catholic High School
- Regina Pacis Catholic Secondary School - closed 2002
- Marian Academy - closed 2002

=== Germany ===
See Heilig-Geist-Gymnasium

=== Province of Ghana ===
The Spiritan mission in Ghana was started in 1971 by a group of Irish Spiritans who left Nigeria after the civil war. With more than forty years of Spiritan mission, the Province of Ghana continues to flourish with more than 100 members working both at home and abroad. Ghana is a democratic constitutional republic divided into ten administrative regions, with a multi-ethnic population of around 24 million as of 2010. Fourteen percent of the population is estimated to be Catholic. Located along the Gulf of Guinea and Atlantic Ocean, in West Africa, Ghana has a land mass of 238,535 km2, with 2,093 kilometres of international land borders. In Ghana, Spiritans are ministering in sixteen parishes in nine of the eighteen dioceses. Many of the parishes are in a situation of primary evangelization in rural and deprived areas. The Province gives attention to basic and primary education in all of its twelve parishes. The Spiritan Technical Vocational School in Ada Nkwame, the Computer school in Kumasi, the Libermann Senior High School in Elubo, and the Spiritan University College in Ejisu are all examples of the Spiritan commitment to evangelization through education. Thirty-five Spiritans from Ghana are on mission outside their home country in fifteen countries.

=== Irish Province ===
The Irish Province covers the island of Ireland (the Republic of Ireland and Northern Ireland).

The first Spiritan house was opened in 1859 by Jules Leman. The Spiritans run five schools in Ireland:

- Blackrock College was founded by the Holy Ghost Fathers in 1860.
- Rockwell College was founded in 1864 and is located near Cashel, County Tipperary.
- St. Michael's College, Dublin, was bought by Blackrock College in 1944 as a second feeder school with Willow Park. In December 1970, St Michael's officially became independent from Blackrock College.
- St Mary's College, Rathmines, Dublin, was founded in 1892.
- Templeogue College was founded in 1966 and is located in Templeogue, Dublin.

Novitiates, Seminaries and Colleges

- Kilshane House, County Tipperary, operated as a junior novitiate from 1933 to 1983.
- Holy Ghost Missionary College, Kimmage Manor, Dublin,
  - Holy Ghost Missionary College, bought by the spiritans in 1911, as a seminary, students studying theology and philosophy, and also taking degrees in UCD. From 1924 until 1933 the Holy Ghost Fathers studied theology at Blackrock Castle, before returning to Kimmage Manor. In 1917 the House of Philosophy moved to St. Mary's, then in 1926 it moved to Blackrock, before moving back to Kimmage in 1938.
  - Kimmage Development Studies Centre (KDSC), was founded in 1974, and operating until 2018 when it was merged into Maynooth University.
  - Kimmage Mission Institute (KMI) – Institute of Theology and Cultures, Kimmage Manor, Dublin, founded 1991 (in association with other missionary congregations), moved to Milltown Institute of Theology and Philosophy in 2003, formally merged with Milltown in 2006.

Spiritans of the Irish Province and Spiritan Associates serve in some 20 countries including Ireland. They administer a number of parishes in west Dublin as well as one in the Diocese of Elphin. St. Mary's School, Nairobi, founded in the Parklands area of Nairobi in 1939 from Blackrock College in Dublin, Ireland.

Notable Irish Spiritans include William Patrick Power, first head of Duquesne University, Pittsburgh, John Charles McQuaid, Archbishop of Dublin 1940–73, Denis Fahey, founder of Maria Duce, Aengus Finucane, who organised food shipments to the Ibo during the Biafra War, John C. O'Riordan, former Bishop of Kenema, Sierra Leone, Robert Ellison, current Bishop of Banjul, Gambia. Mauritian-born, Cardinal Maurice Piat CSSp, studied with the Irish province, in Kimmage.

==== Irish Provincial Superiors ====
- Jules Botrel
- Richard Harnett
- Brian McLaughlin
- Enda Watters (1976-1982)
- Roddy Curran (1988-1994)
- Brian Starken (2006-2012)
- Marc Whelan (2012-2018)
- Martin Kelly (since 2018)

=== Mauritius ===
Spiritans in the 1840s dedicated themselves to working with newly freed slaves on the islands of Haiti, Mauritius and Réunion. The Spiritans created the college du Saint Esprit, a French and English speaking college in Mauritius.

=== Mexico ===
Today, Mexican-born Spiritans outnumber Spiritan missionaries from other countries. Spiritans run a seminary program in Mexico.

=== Netherlands ===
The Dutch congregation was founded by Albert Sebire in 1905. A number of Spiritans from the Netherlands have played a significant role for the order, including Frans Timmermans who served as Superior, Bishops Bernhard Gerhard Hilhorst and Herman Jan van Elswijk who served as Bishops of Morogoro in Tanzania, which the province was in charge of.

=== Trinidad and Tobago ===
The Spiritans run three schools in Trinidad and Tobago:

- Saint Mary's College established in 1863
- Our Lady of Fatima College established in 1945
- Saint Anthony's College (Trinidad)

=== United States Province ===
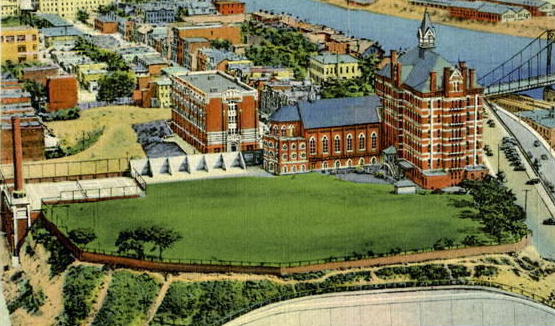
Duquesne University, founded in 1878 in Pittsburgh, Pennsylvania, is the only Spiritan institution of higher education in the world.

In 1794 a Spiritan refugee of the French Revolution in Guiana started a new mission in the U.S. However, it was only after Archbishop John Baptist Purcell repeatedly asked between 1847 and 1851 for personnel to staff a seminary in Cincinnati that Spiritans arrived steadily. Other dioceses such as Savannah, Florida, Philadelphia, and Natchez also requested personnel.

The province of the United States, founded in 1873, had a novitiate and senior scholasticate at Ferndale in the Diocese of Hartford, and an apostolic college at Cornwells near Philadelphia. The main object of these institutions was to train missionaries to work among the poor, especially ethnic minorities. The Spiritans concentrated on the Pittsburgh area. Despite knowing of four failures of setting up a Catholic college in Pittsburgh, the Spiritans persisted in setting up an institution which became Duquesne University.

In East Africa, where most of the American Spiritans now serve, they began to work in the 1860s by buying men and women out of slavery in Zanzibar. They opened schools and hospitals, taught people marketable skills, and gave property to those who needed it. The Spiritans pioneered modern missionary activity in Africa and ultimately sent more missionaries there than any other religious institute in the Catholic Church.

For decades the Spiritans worked closely with Katherine Drexel in the apostolate to African-Americans in the urban North and in small towns and cities of the South and Southwest. The Spiritans in America concentrate on work among immigrants, black parishes, and education in Duquesne University and Holy Ghost Preparatory School, near Philadelphia. Historically, they have sent missionaries to Sierra Leone, Tanzania, Puerto Rico, Latin America, and Ethiopia. As of 2022 Spiritans are focusing on Brazil, Mexico, the Philippines, and Taiwan. In 1964 there was a separation at the Mississippi River between a Western Province and an Eastern Province, but both provinces reunited. Candidates in theological formation are sent to Catholic Theological Union in Chicago where several Spiritans teach.

In 2012 the province established the Spiritan Office for Mission Advancement(SOMA)to animate the Congregations mission works. SOMA implements its mission by financially resourcing and practically supporting the missionary, educational, pastoral, humanitarian and charitable projects and programs of the Congregation and the U.S. Province both in the United States and internationally. In addition to responding to natural disasters such as earthquakes, cyclones, typhoons, crop infestations, draughts, famines, and viral infections such as Ebola and COVID-19, SOMA’S mission priorities include:

Evangelization: related projects: catechesis, lay missionary religious training, missionary bicycles and teaching materials, church construction

Education: school construction, student scholarships, desks and chairs, computer lab, training materials

Economic and community Development: sustainable farming, women's sewing cooperative, parish bakeries, women's empowerment. technical skills training

Health and wellness: supplemental food, emergency generators, electricity delivery, solar paneling, rain water catchment systems, boreholes, water tanks, toilet facilities, medical dispensary construction, medical equipment and supplies, supplemental feeding

Priestly Formation: seminarian tuition support, supplemental feeding, teaching aids

Social Justice: women and men's rehabilitation center, cots for prison detainees, orphan care, refugee housing

In 2023 the U.S. Province celebrated its 150th anniversary.

=== Vietnam ===
The Spiritans arrived in Vietnam in September 2007. As of 2022 the Congregation has three communities in Ho Chi Minh City, with more than 40 members.

== Causes of canonization ==
=== Blesseds ===
- Jacques-Désiré Laval (18 September 1803 – 9 September 1864), priest and "Apostle of Mauritius", beatified on 29 April 1979
- Daniel Jules Alexis Brottier (7 September 1876 – 28 February 1936), priest and missionary to Senegal, beatified on 25 November 1984

=== Venerables ===
- François-Marie-Paul Libermann (12 April 1804 - 2 February 1852), the "second founder" of the Spiritans and the 11th Superior General of the Congregation, declared Venerable on 19 June 1910

=== Servants of God' ===
- Claude-François Poullart des Places (26 February 1679 – 2 October 1709), founder of the Congregation, declared as a Servant of God on 30 September 2005
- Aloÿs Kobès (17 April 1820 – 11 October 1872), Apostolic Vicar of Senegambia, founder of both the Daughters of the Holy Heart of Mary, and the Brothers of Saint Joseph
- Joseph Shanahan (4 June 1871 – 25 December 1943), Bishop of Onitsha and founder of the Missionary Sisters of Our Lady of the Holy Rosary, declared as a Servant of God on 24 May 1996
- Jean-Marie Godefroid and 19 Companions (died 1 January 1962), Martyrs of the Democratic Republic of the Congo
- Gordon Anthony Pantin (27 August 1929 – 12 March 2000), Archbishop of Port of Spain in Trinidad and Tobago, declared as a Servant of God in 2014

== Child sexual abuse ==
Members of the Spiritans have been associated with a number of child sexual abuse cases in Ireland; the Spiritans acknowledged in 2022 that they had paid out over €5m (£4.4m) in settlements for sexual abuse cases since 2004. In 2022 the Garda Síochána (Irish police) were involved in the investigation; 233 people had made allegations against 77 members of the Spiritans. Martin Kelly, leader of the Spiritans, admitted and apologised for abuse. At least six abusers are known to have operated at Blackrock College. The allegations concern cases in Ireland; there is evidence that perpetrators taught in Sierra Leone and Nigeria.

== Sources ==
- Koren, Henry. To the Ends of the Earth. Pittsburgh: Duquesne University Press, 1983.
