= Charles De Garmo =

American educator, education theorist and college president

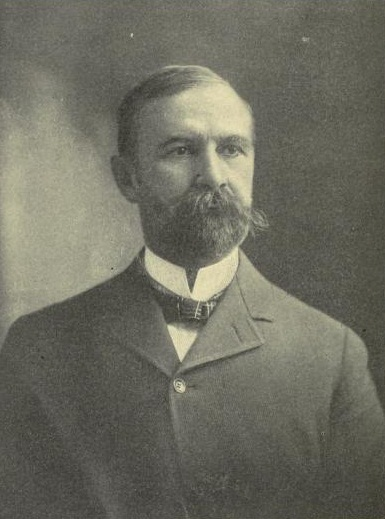
Charles De Garmo

Charles De Garmo (also spelled DeGarmo; January 7, 1849 – May 14, 1934) was an American educator, education theorist and college president.

== Biography ==
DeGarmo was born in Mukwonago, Wisconsin, on January 7, 1849. His parents moved to Sterling, Illinois, in 1852 and later to Lebanon, Illinois. In 1865, at the age of sixteen, DeGarmo enlisted in the Union Army. Upon his return from service, DeGarmo enrolled at Illinois State Normal University (ISNU) in 1870, where he would graduate in 1873. Following his graduation in 1873, DeGarmo moved to Naples, Illinois, where he was principal of an Illinois graded school. In 1876, DeGarmo returned to Normal, Illinois, serving as principal of the Grammar Department of its Model School at ISNU until 1883.

Alongside Edmund James, DeGarmo helped found the Illinois School Journal in 1881, which became the leading publication in Illinois for educational discussions of teaching pedagogy and theories. In 1883, DeGarmo sold the publication to John W. Cook, while heavily influenced by Herbartianism and Edmund James, he planned to study education in Halle, Germany, and Jena, Germany, for at least two years. He quickly became intrigued by the teachings of leading Herbartianists, such as Karl Volkmar Stoy, Willheim Rein, Otto Frick, and Tuiskon Ziller. DeGarmo earned a Ph.D. in educational history and psychology in 1886.

In 1886, DeGarmo wrote to James stating, "After staying there [Jena] for one year, I went to Halle where I took my degree (Ph.D. 1886), and became a follow of Dr. Frick of the Weisenhaus, who held a half-way position between the orthodox Stoy and radical Rein, the successor of Stoy at Jena." DeGarmo's position proved to be vital to the success of Herbartianism stemming from ISNU in the 1890s, as it took pieces from both ends of the Herbartianist spectrum, radical to orthodox, to form a well rounded idea of the pedagogy that touched on nearly every issue in education.

From 1886 to 1890, DeGarmo served as the modern languages instructor at ISNU and its model school, implementing Herbartian methodology in his teaching At ISNU, DeGarmo translated various German works of educational theory, most of which were Herbartian in nature and wrote Essentials of Method, which was written for teachers using Herbartian methods and principles to create "model lessons".

Authors, Charles A. Harper and Harold B. Dunkel credit DeGarmo, along with Charles A. McMurry, Frank M. McMurry and other prominent adherents of Herbartianism such as Lida Brown McMurry, John W. Cook and Edmund James for transforming the campus of Illinois State Normal University into the "Herbartian Center of America".

He served as president of Swarthmore College from 1891 to 1898 and then joined the education faculty at Cornell University. During his time at Swarthmore, he was elected to the American Philosophical Society.

De Garmo was a prolific author of more than one hundred articles and books about educational theory and practice.

He died in retirement in Miami on May 15, 1934, and was buried at Woodlawn Park North Cemetery.
