= C.C. Van Liew =

American educator

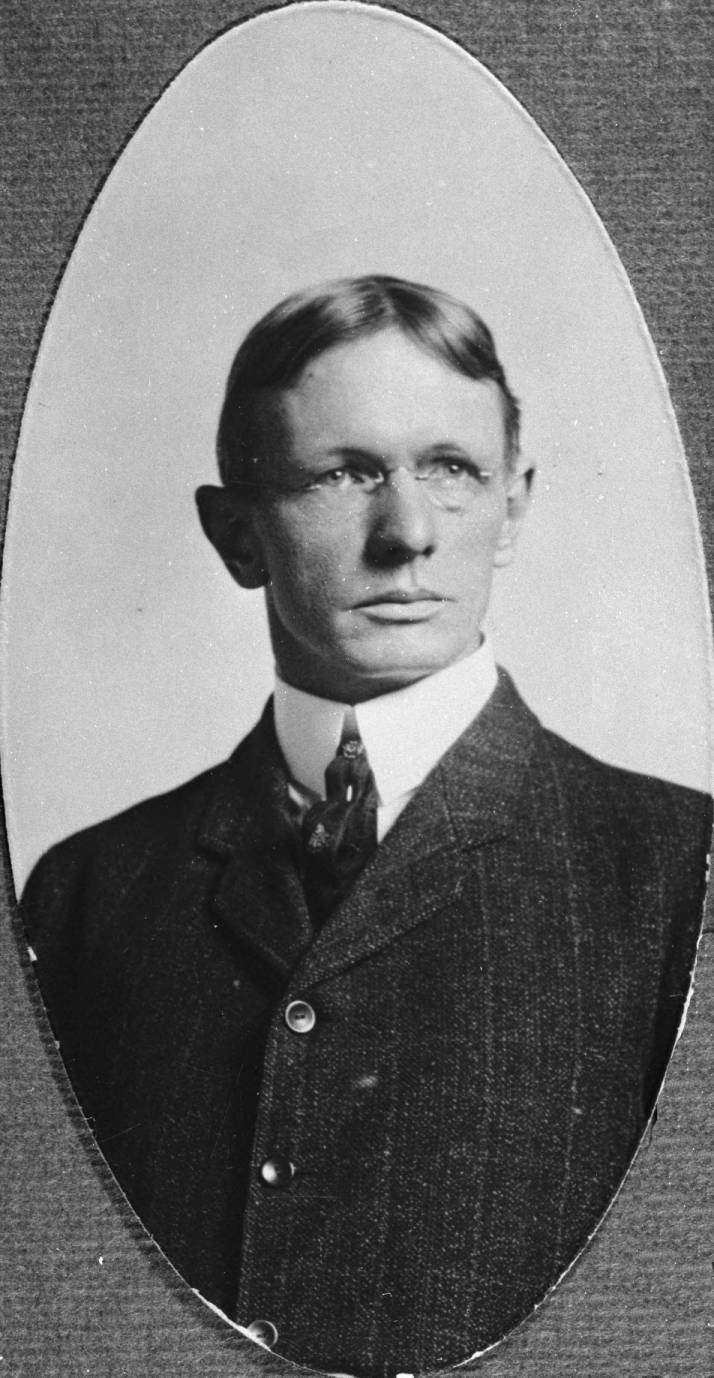
Dr. C.C. Van Liew Portrait as President of Chico State Normal School in 1909

Charles Cecil Van Liew (C.C.) (February 15, 1862 - ) was a prominent American educator, educational theorist, and pioneer of American Herbartianism throughout the late nineteenth and early twentieth centuries in the United States.

== Early life ==
In 1862, Van Liew was born in Aurora, Illinois to Frederick Hobart and Mary Van Liew. His father practiced and studied medicine. He was educated within common-schools and graduated from high school in Aurora in 1881.

== Education and Herbartianism ==
In 1889, Van Liew began attending German universities within the towns of Leipzig and Jena. During his time in Germany, Van Liew studied and translated the works of Willheim Rein, a prominent figure within Herbartianism. He also was a student under Rein, which further deepened his interest in educational pedagogy and theory. In 1893, Van Liew received his Ph.D. and returned to the United States to work within normal schools.

In 1894, Van Liew began working for Illinois State Normal University (ISNU), where he served as a professor of psychology, reading, and pedagogy. During his tenure at Illinois State, Van Liew worked on blending aspects of German Herbartianism and child studies, to form a teaching and educational pedagogy that sought to elevate students and educational institutions in which he served and beyond. Throughout the 1890s, Van Liew served as a member of the National Herbart Society, along with prominent American Herbartianists Charles A. McMurry and Frank M. McMurry. He is widely considered to be one of the most influential and prominent figures of Herbartianism within the United States. In addition, Van Liew was secretary-treasurer of the Illinois Society for Child Study until he moved to California in 1897, where he served as president of the Chico State Normal School.
