= Lida Brown McMurry =

American educator and author (1853–1942)

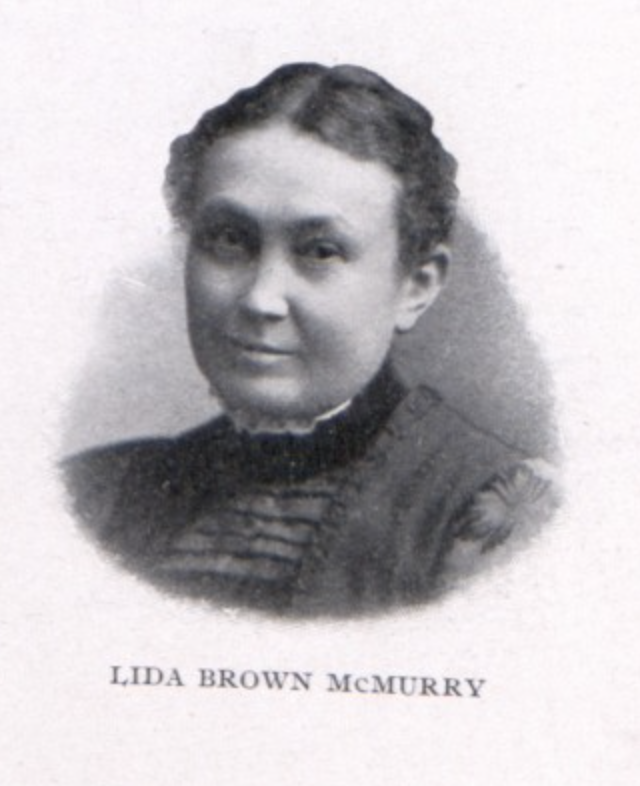
Yearbook photo of Lida Brown McMurry at Northern Illinois State Normal (1901)

Lida Brown McMurry (1853–1942) was an American educator, author, YWCA founder, and prominent figure within American Herbartianism throughout the late nineteenth and early twentieth centuries.

In 1853, McMurry was born in the state of New York, but by her early childhood, her family had moved to Illinois.

She is the sister of Elmer Ellsworth Brown who served as the United States Commissioner of Education from 1906 to 1911.

She is the sister-in-law of American Herbartianist educators, Charles A. McMurry and Frank M. McMurry.

== Career in education ==
McMurry began her educational career at the age of sixteen, working in rural Illinois schools before enrolling in Illinois State Normal University (ISNU) in the early 1870s. She graduated from ISNU in 1874, and continued to teach in rural Illinois schools, until returning to the university in 1891, where she held the position of elementary "critic teacher" in ISNU's practice school. During her time at Illinois State, McMurry participated in the National Herbart Society, Herbart Club, and various educational discussion groups, all of which were held on the university's campus.

Her contributions to the Herbartian movement at ISNU came in the form of her literary and teaching skills, which earned her the title, "The Great Primary Teacher of the Herbartians". McMurry authored several books for instructors on how to incorporate aspects of German Herbartianism into early childhood education. She authored sixteen volumes of Stories for the First Grade, aiming to prepare the instructor to apply and present these educational stories with purpose. In addition, her journal submission, "Plan of Concentration for the First Two School Years" in the First Yearbook of the National Herbart Society, is revered as one of the greatest contributions to the American Herbartian movement, as it earned her national notoriety and gave definitive goals for educators to aim for.

Charles McKenny, second president of Central Michigan University, admired Brown's work as an educator and author, stating that by the early twentieth century she had become, "The recognized leader in primary education in the Middle West."

In 1900, McMurry left Illinois State Normal University to join Charles A. McMurry and John W. Cook at Northern Illinois State Normal at Dekalb, where she would continue educating throughout the early twentieth century.

McMurry Hall, located on the campus of Northern Illinois University, is named after Mrs. McMurry and her brother-in-law, Charles A. McMurry. It was opened in 1911, where Charles served as the director of the school hall for teacher education and Mrs. McMurry as the subsequent educator of elementary school students.

== Young Women's Christian Association ==
In 1872, while enrolled at Illinois State Normal University, McMurry invited several classmates to her room to participate in a prayer meeting, though only six had attended. The group consisted of Lida Brown McMurry, Ida E. Brown, Emma Stewart, Jennie Leonard, Ms. Hopkins, and Mrs. Hattie Lawson.

This group of women, led by McMurry, had begun to meet regularly every week following the first meeting, thus marking the birth of the first chapter of the Students' Young Women's Christian Association, which later became the Young Women's Christian Association in 1881.

By 1911, thirty-five YWCA chapters were active in Illinois, while six hundred sixty-seven active chapters across the United States and Europe, comprising 54,369 members.

In 2022, there are over 200 active YWCA chapters in the United States, serving over 2.3 million women and children across thirty-three states. Today, the YWCA focuses on serving women and children through a variety of wellness programs that aid the victims of sexual assault, trafficking, domestic violence, substance abuse, and mental health struggles.

== Published works ==
Throughout her career in education, McMurry was an established prolific author of educational children's books, authoring thirty titles in over one hundred publications by the early 1930s.

- Fifty Famous Fables (1910; first edition)
- Nature Study Lessons for Primary Grades (1905; first edition)
- A Method for Teaching Primary Reading (1914; first edition)
- Special Method in Natural Science for the First Four Grades of the Common School (1899; first edition), with C.A. McMurry
- Robinson Crusoe for Boys and Girls (1915; first edition), with D. Dafoe, M.H. Husted
- Classic Stories for Little Ones (1895; first edition)
- Our Language, Book I (1905; first edition), with F. T. Norvell
- Songs of the Tree-Top and Meadow
- Songs of a Mother and Child (1905; first edition), with A. Gale
- The Smith-McMurry Language Series (1919; volume four), with C. A. Smith
- Plan of Concentration for First Two School Years
- Hints for Primary Teachers (1911; first edition)
