= Wilhelm Rein =

German educational theorist (1847–1929)

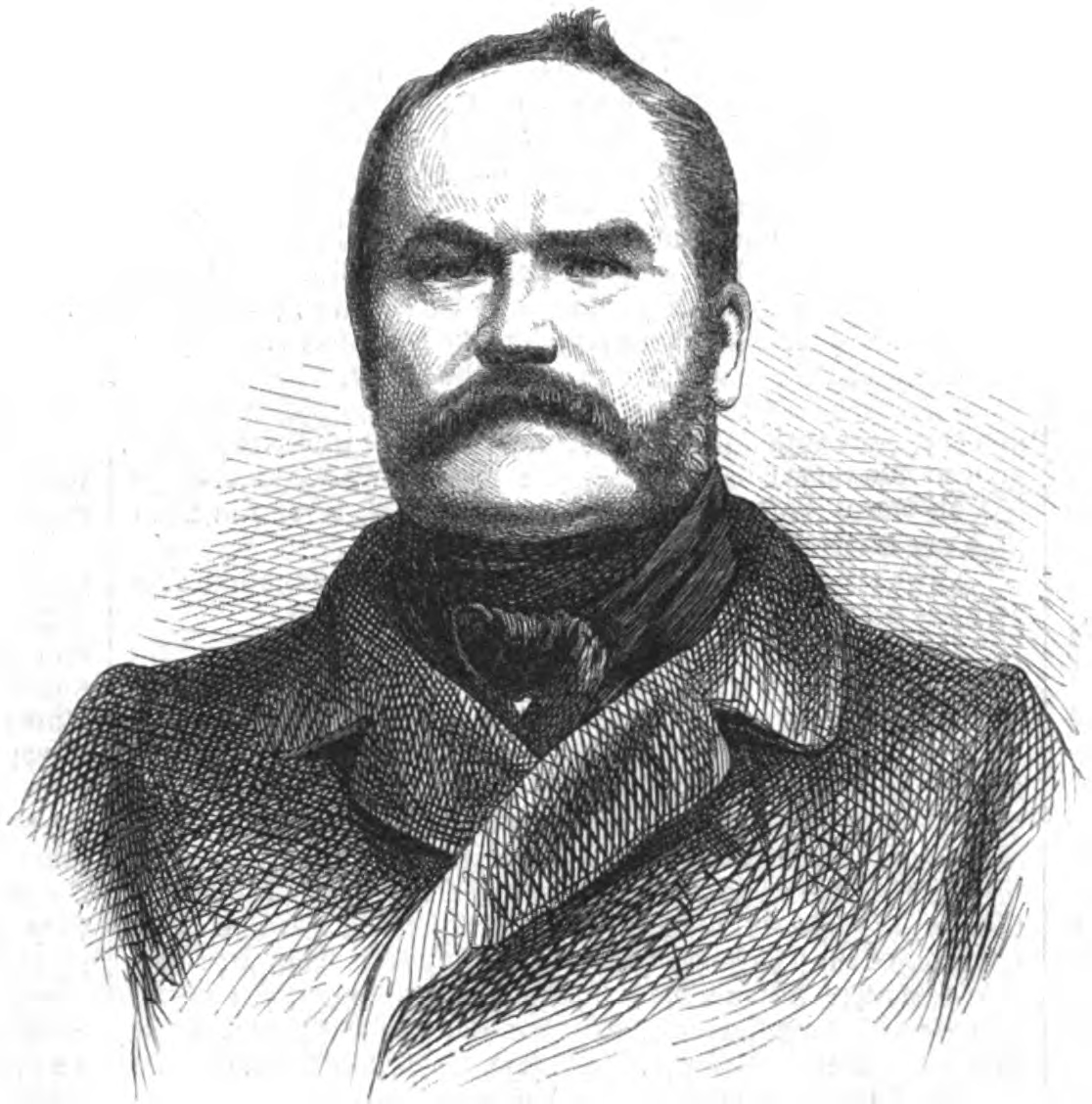
Wilhelm Rein (1865)

Wilhelm Rein (10 August 1847 in Eisenach – 19 February 1929 in Jena) was a German educational theorist. He was a late representative of the Herbartian school.

== Biography ==
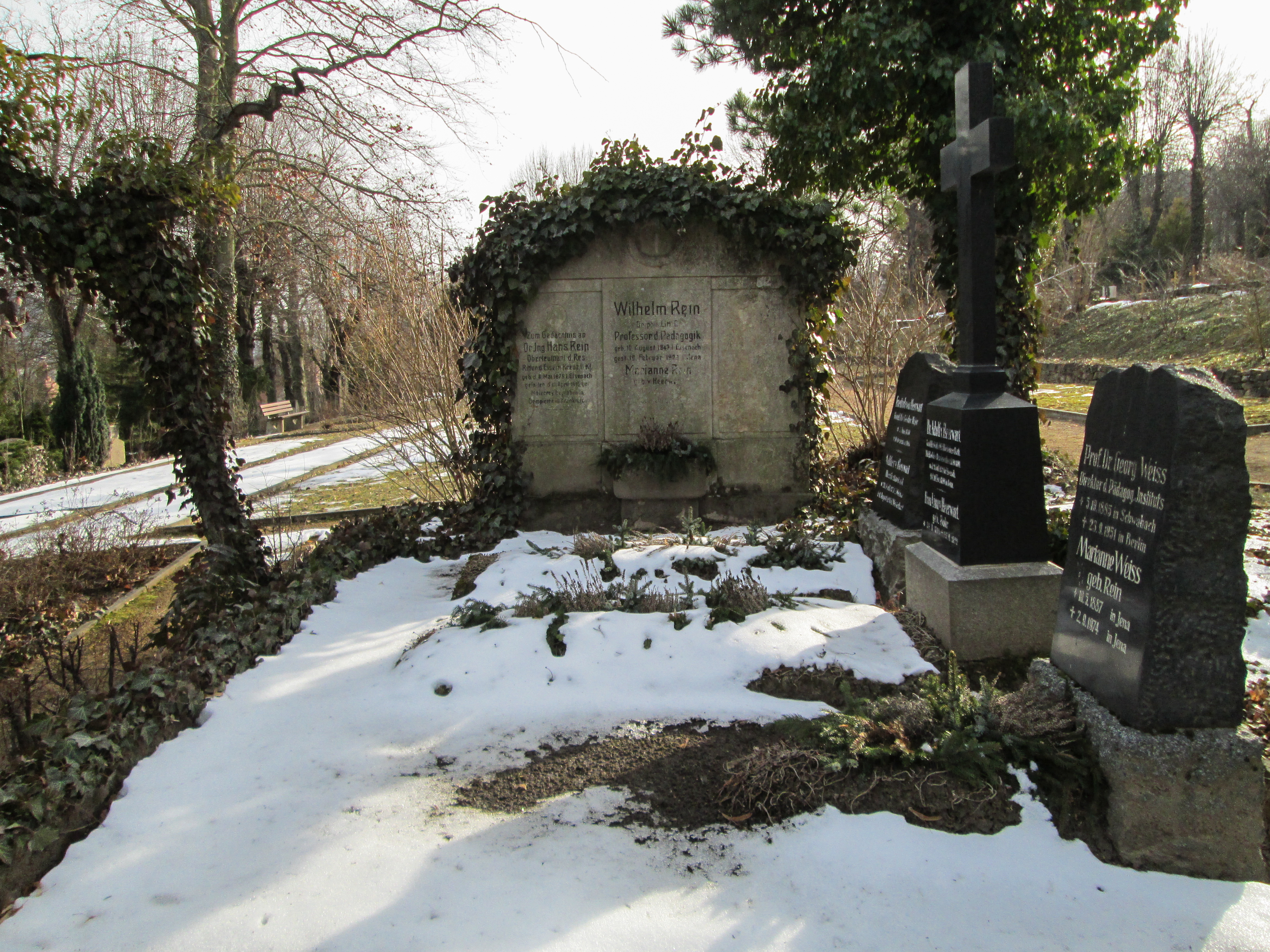
Grave in Jena

After graduating from the Eisenach gymnasium in 1866, Rein studied theology in Jena, also listening to lectures on pedagogy by Karl Volkmar Stoy who he followed a year later to Heidelberg. He returned to Jena in 1868 and passed his theological candidacy exam in Weimar in 1869. At this point, he turned his studies exclusively to pedagogy, going on to study under Tuiskon Ziller at Leipzig. In 1871 he became a teacher at Friedrich Wilhelm Dörpfeld's school in Barmen, in 1872 a teacher in Weimar, and moved to Eisenach in 1876. In 1886, he was appointed professor in Jena as Stoy's successor. One of his students was Hermann Lietz.

== Works ==
- Theorie und Praxis des Volksschulunterrichts (“Theory and practice of common school instruction,” 1879-93)
- Pedagogik im Grundriss (“Outline of pedagogy,” 1892)

He edited Niemeyer's Grundsätze der Erziehung (1878–79), and founded the educational journal Pädagogische Studien in 1880.
