= List of Town of Normal Local Landmark Properties and Districts =

List of local historic sites in Normal, Illinois

Historic Landmarks and Districts is a designation of the Town of Normal Historic Preservation Commission (HPC). Many of these landmarks are also listed on the National Register of Historic Places.

== Historic Preservation Commission ==
The Town of Normal's Historic Preservation Commission (HPC) approves new historic districts and landmarks. The Historic Preservation Commission was established in 1990 and authorized by Section 15.16.

=== Criteria ===
The Preservation Commission shall, upon such investigation as it deems necessary, make a determination as to whether a nominated property, structures, or area meets one (1) or more of the following criteria:

1. Its character, interest, or value as part of the development, heritage, or cultural characteristics of the Town, County of McLean, State of Illinois or the United States of America (the Nation);
2. Its location as a site of a significant local, county, state, or national event;
3. Its identification with a person or persons who significantly contributed to the development of the Town, County of McLean, State of Illinois, or the Nation;
4. Its embodiment of distinguishing characteristics of an architectural style valuable for the study of a period, type, method of construction, or use of indigenous materials;
5. Its identification as the work of a master builder, designer, architect, or landscape architect whose individual work has influenced the development of the Town, County of McLean, State of Illinois, or the Nation;
6. Its embodiment of elements of design, detailing, materials, or craftsmanship that render it architecturally significant;
7. Its embodiment of design elements that make it structurally or architecturally innovative;
8. Its unique location or singular physical characteristics that make it an established or familiar visual feature;
9. Its character as a particularly fine or unique example of an utilitarian structure, including, but not limited to farmhouses, gas stations, or other commercial structures, with a high level of integrity or architectural significance; and/or
10. Its suitability for preservation or restoration;
11. The geographic area which is the subject of the petition has definable boundaries in the form of natural features or existing physical improvements; or a visual sense of history within the proposed boundaries; and the buildings, places or areas within the proposed district, by their inclusion therein, are of sufficient historic significance to be worthy of rehabilitation, restoration and preservation because either:

a. The proposed district contains within definable geographic boundaries one or more landmarks along with such other buildings, places or areas, which, while not such historic significance to be designated as landmarks, nevertheless contribute to the overall visual characteristics of the landmark or landmarks located within the district; or b. The proposed district contains within definable geographic boundaries such buildings, places or areas which while not such individual significance to be designated as landmarks, nevertheless, as an aggregate, possess historic significance establishing a sense of time and place unique to the Town of Normal.

== List of landmarks ==
=== Individual landmarks ===
Landmark Name	Image	Location	Built	Designation date	NRHP date
Former hardware store		102 S. Linden Street	1887	April 15, 1996	
Ecology Action Center		202 W. College Avenue	Circa 1860	July 19, 1993	
Residence		206 W. Lincoln Street	1866-1870	June 15, 1992	
Normal Theater		209 North Street	1937	November 4, 1991	July 25, 1997
Sprague's Super Service		305 E. Pine Street	1930-1931	August 15, 2011	April 25, 2008
John Gregory House		607 N. Main Street	1860s	April 15, 1991	
Orson Leroy Manchester House		705 S. Broadway Avenue	1916	November 20, 1995	
Fairview Sanitorium		905 N. Main Street	1919		September 1, 2021
Residence		905 W. Hovey Avenue	1900	May 18, 1998	
Kersey Fell's house		1202 S. Fell Avenue	1870	May 15, 2000	
Van Leer's Broadview Mansion		1301 S. Fell Avenue	1906	August 17, 2015	
Camelback Bridge		Constitution Trail	1870	April 15, 1991	May 15, 1997
Cook Hall		Illinois State University	1898		February 20, 1986
Fell Park		Cypress St (north); Willow St (south); Oak St (east); Walnut St (west)	mid-1850s	October 20, 2003	

==== 102 S. Linden Street ====
This two-story brick building was built in 1887 in Uptown Normal. It served as a hardware store owned by George Champion, an agricultural equipment dealer and mayor of Normal.

==== 202 W. College Avenue, Ecology Action Center ====
This wooden frame house with Italianate and Greek Revival elements dates to the early 1860s. It was built by Edwin C. Hewitt, one of the first professors at the Normal School.

==== 206 W. Lincoln Street ====
This Italianate house was built by John R. Gaston between 1866 and 1870.

==== 607 N. Main Street ====
The John Gregory House is the oldest residence in the Town of Normal. This Italianate-style home was likely built between 1857 and 1870.

==== 705 S. Broadway Avenue ====
This Queen Anne style house was built in 1916 by Orson Leroy Manchester, a dean at the Illinois State Normal University and mayor of Normal from 1907 to 1917.

==== Fell Park ====
The land was set aside as a park in the mid-1850s by Jesse Fell and other co-owners. The park officially became a public property in 1898. The town constructed a water tower in the park in 1898 and built brick sidewalks on the park perimeter in the early 1900s.

=== Historic Districts ===
==== Local Historic Districts ====
- Cedar Crest Historic District
- Highland Historic District
- Old North Normal District

== See also ==
- National Register of Historic Places listings in McLean County, Illinois
