= Lynn H. Hough =

American Methodist clergyman, theologian and academic administrator

The Reverend Lynn H. Hough

9th President of Northwestern University
- In office 1919–1920
- Preceded by: Abram W. Harris; Thomas F. Holgate (interim)
- Succeeded by: Walter Dill Scott

Dean of Drew Theological Seminary
- In office 1934–1947

Personal details
- Born: Lynn Harold Hough; September 10, 1877 Cadiz, Ohio, US
- Died: July 14, 1971 (aged 93) Manhattan, New York City
- Spouse: Blanche Horton (m. 1936; died 1970)

Ecclesiastical career
- Religion: Christianity (Methodist)
- Church: Methodist Episcopal Church; Methodist Church

Academic background
- Education: Scio College; Drew University; Garrett Biblical Institute
- Influences: Irving Babbitt; Paul Elmer More

Academic work
- Discipline: Theology
- School or tradition: Christian humanism; theological liberalism
- Institutions: Garrett Biblical Institute; Northwestern University; Drew University

Lynn Harold Hough (1877–1971) was an American Methodist clergyman, theologian, and academic administrator. He served as the 9th president of Northwestern University from 1919 to 1920.

== Early life and education ==
Lynn H. Hough was born on September 10, 1877, in Cadiz, Ohio. He earned a bachelor's degree from Scio College in 1898 and Drew University in 1905, followed by a doctorate from Garrett Biblical Institute in 1918.

== Career ==
Hough began his career as a Methodist clergyman in the Northeast in 1898, up until 1914.

Hough taught at his alma mater, Garrett Biblical Institute, from 1914 to 1919. He succeeded Thomas Holgate as the president of Northwestern University from 1919 to 1920. During his tenure, he approved a new Master of Business Administration degree program in the School of Commerce (now known as the Kellogg School of Management) and he began a $25-million fundraising campaign to expand the campus.

Hough was a professor at his alma mater's Drew Theological Seminary from 1930 to 1934, and its dean from 1934 to 1947. He authored several books about Christianity.

- The Significance Of The Protestant Reformation (Abdingdon Press, 1918)

== Personal life and death ==
In 1936, Hough married Blanche Horton; she predeceased him in 1970. He resided at 1165 Fifth Avenue on the island of Manhattan, New York City, where he died on July 14, 1971.

== See also ==
- Christian Flag

Academic offices
Preceded by Thomas F. Holgate	President of Northwestern University; 1919–1920	Succeeded by Walter Dill Scott
Preceded by	Dean of Drew Theological Seminary; 1934–1947	Succeeded by Fred Garrigus Holloway
