= Friedrich Wilhelm Dörpfeld =

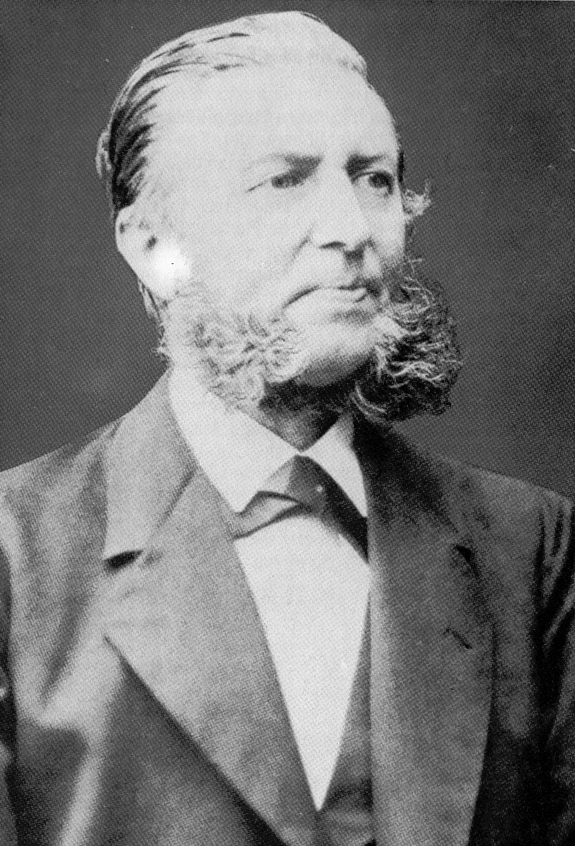
- Born: 8 March 1824; Wermelskirchen
- Died: 27 October 1893; Ronsdorf
- Occupation: Pedagogue
- Movement: Herbartianism
- Children: Wilhelm Dörpfeld, Anna Carnap-Dörpfeld

Friedrich Wilhelm Dörpfeld (8 March 1824 – 27 October 1893) was a German pedagogue. A practising teacher, Dörpfeld never held a position at a university but was still considered a pedagogical authority. Dörpfeld applied the Herbartian philosophy to the level of elementary school. His Herbartianism was influenced by German Romanticism and therefore had strong religious undertones. Nevertheless, Dörpfeld defended the self-governance of schools against both secular and religious authorities. After retiring, Dörpfeld devoted himself to writing, most importantly The Connection Between Thought and Memory (Denken und Gedächtnis: eine psychologische Monographie, 1886). He was father to Wilhelm Dörpfeld, the archaeologist, and Anna Carnap-Dörpfeld, the mother of Rudolf Carnap. Dörpfeld's work is said to have influenced Carnap's philosophy.

== Early life ==
Dörpfeld was born in Sellscheid near Wermelskirchen, Prussia on 8 March 1824 to Johann Wilhelm Dörpfeld, a farmer and hammersmith, and his wife Anna Wilhelmine Jung.

He attended a teachers' seminary in Mörs (Moers). In 1848 he became a teacher at an elementary school in Heidt, near Ronsdorf. His talent was quickly noticed and he transferred to another elementary school in Barmen the following year. He worked there for 30 years, eventually becoming the school's principal.

== Pedagogy ==
Dörpfeld adopted the pedagogical methods of Johann Friedrich Herbart (1776–1841), called Herbartianism, and applied them to the elementary school level. Herbart's philosophy viewed individuals as always socially situated, molded by their environment, and subject to study only through empirical means. The individual's self-development should be an end in itself, without it being subordinate to the needs of the church or even of educational institutions. During Dörpfeld's time, these lofty "quasi-Enlightenment" ideals had given way to German Romanticism, and Dörpfeld and his contemporaries developed Herbartianism to that direction. Thus, to Dörpfeld the situatedness of the individual meant his relationship with original sin and, overall, religious themes were emphasized.

Dörpfeld emphasized the social aspects of schooling even more than Herbart, and was convinced that sociology should not be taught as a distinct discipline but should instead inform the teaching of subjects such as history and geography. Moreover, Dörpfeld believed that schools should be completely self-governing in internal matters and free from influence of both secular and church authorities. He was staunchly opposed to the tendencies of bureaucratization and centralization in Prussian schools on the elementary and secondary levels. As a practical matter, listening to the teacher is generally preferred compared to reading in class. Dörpfeld was also a critic of his fellow Herbartian Tuiskon Ziller, whose version of the pedagogy is known as Zillerianism. In spite of being a highly respected authority on pedagogy, Dörpfeld never had a position at a university.

Dörpfeld retired in 1880 because of asthma and, living on pension, focused on writing, his most important work being The Connection Between Thought and Memory (Denken und Gedächtnis: eine psychologische Monographie, 1886). He died on 27 October 1893 in Ronsdorf. Dörpfeld also wrote widely on pedagogy, psychology, and philosophy; for example On Ethics (Zur Ethik, published 1895), which is considered his most important philosophical work. He founded the journal Evangelische Schulblatt in 1857 and managed it actively until his death.

A 10-volume posthumous edition of Dörpfeld's works was published by the C. Bertelsmann Verlag. His prolific writings were widely circulated, and "still belong to the canon of German educational classics".

== Personal life ==
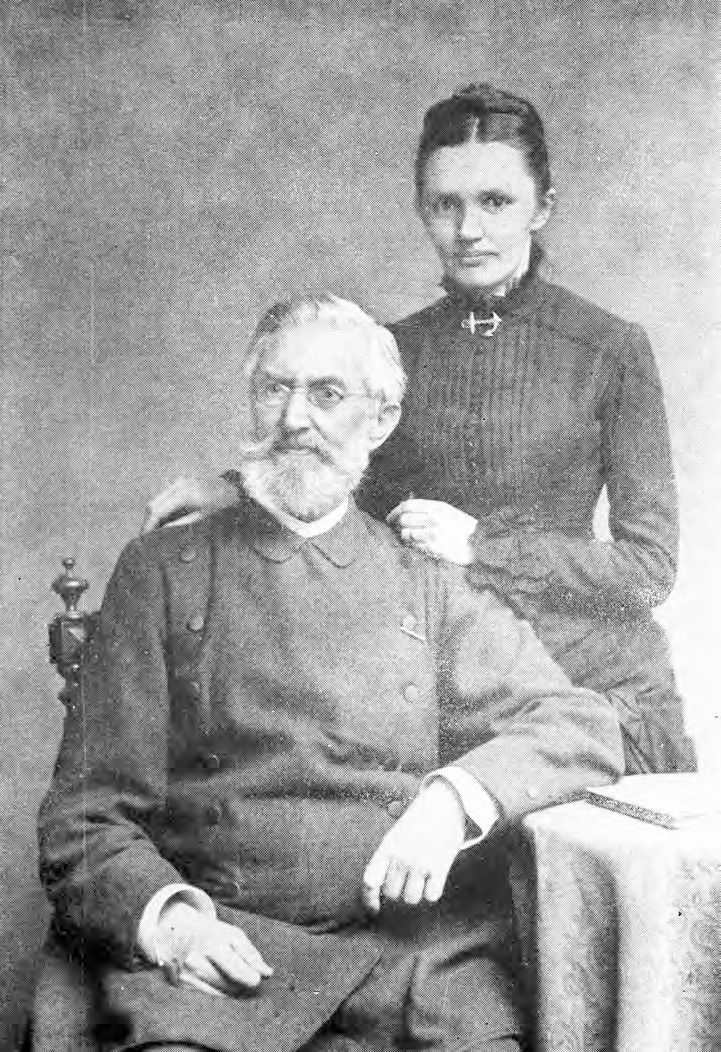
Wilhelm and his eldest daughter Anna

Dörpfeld married Christine Keller, the daughter of a pastor, in 1851. The couple had two sons and four daughters. One of the sons, Wilhelm Dörpfeld, was a famous archaeologist. The eldest daughter, Anna Carnap-Dörpfeld, was the mother of the analytic philosopher Rudolf Carnap. Anna used his father's Herbartian methods when homeschooling Rudolf. According to Christian Damböck, Carnap was familiar with his grandfather's work, which had an influence on his own philosophy. Anna also wrote a two-volume biography of Dörpfeld. Dörpfeld was a Lutheran.
