= David Felmley =

American educator (1857-1930)

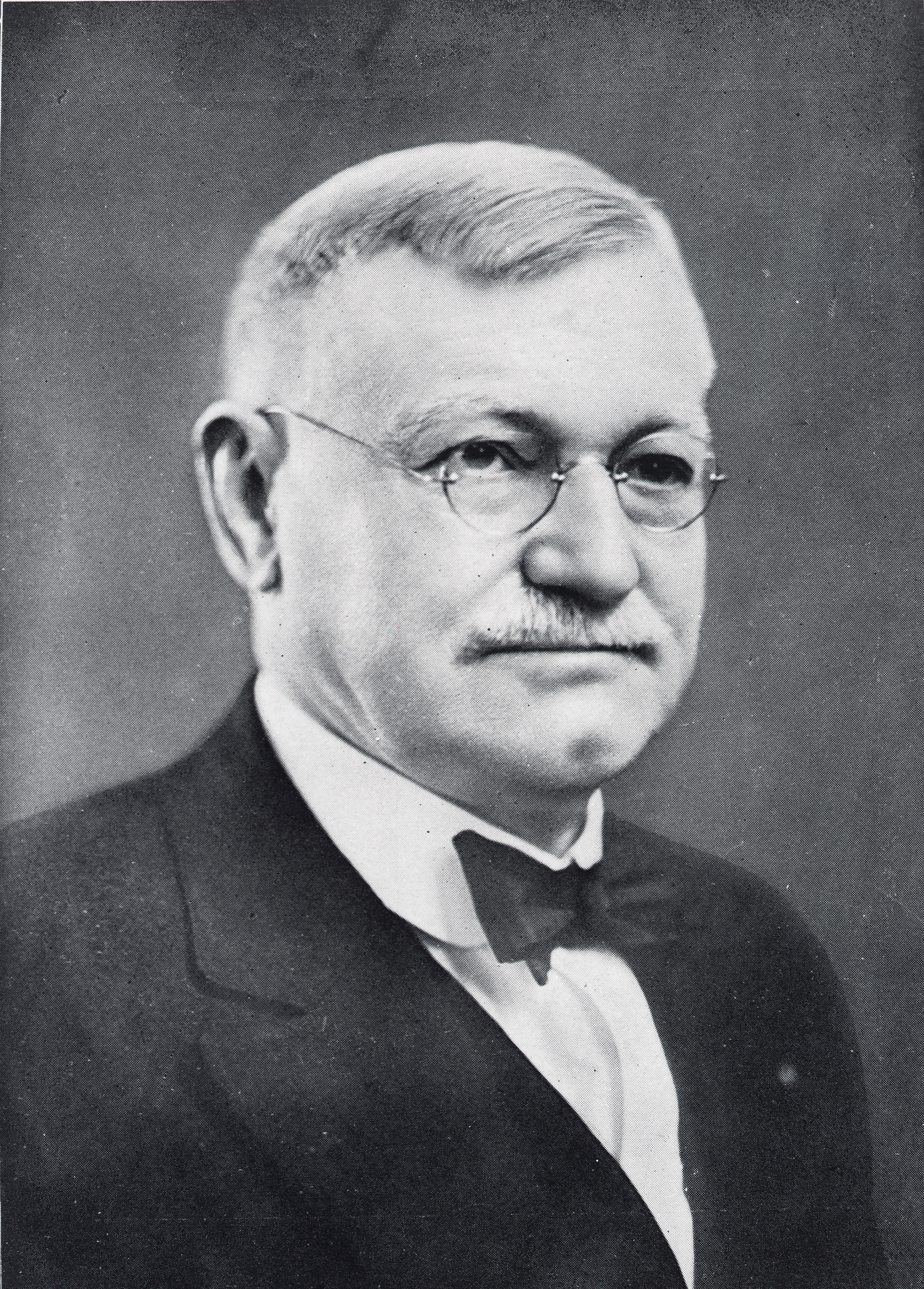

Sixth President of Illinois State Normal University
- In office 1900–1930
- Preceded by: Arnold Tompkins
- Succeeded by: Harry A Brown

Personal details
- Born: April 24, 1857 Somerville, New Jersey
- Died: January 24, 1930 (aged 72) Normal, Illinois

David Felmley (April 24, 1857 – January 24, 1930) was an American educator best known for his thirty-year-long tenure as the sixth president of Illinois State University, then known as Illinois State Normal University.

== Personal life and early career ==
David Felmley was born on April 24, 1857, near Somerville, New Jersey. In 1868, his family moved to Perry, Illinois. In 1873, Felmley enrolled in Blackburn College in Carlinville, Illinois. Later, at the age of nineteen, he began at the University of Michigan, graduating in 1881. He then became the superintendent of schools in Carrollton, Illinois, following his graduation. In 1887, Felmley married Auta Stout, although she died in July 1921.

In 1890, when John W. Cook became the president of Illinois State Normal University, Felmley took over his position as the professor of mathematics. When Arnold Tompkins departed ISNU in 1900, Felmley was chosen as the next president of the university. He was a charter member of the Rotary Club and the College Alumni Club in Bloomington, and was also a member of Phi Beta Kappa, Delta Upsilon, and Pi Kappa Delta. He was elected the first president of the National Council of Normal School Presidents. He was remarried in March 1928 to Jennie Green. He had three children, Mildred, John, and Mrs. A. B. Meek, who was married. Felmley was a member of the National Society for the Scientific Study of Education during his time at ISNU. He was also a member of the State Teachers' Association and was elected its president in 1901.

== Presidency at Illinois State Normal University ==
Felmley served as the president of ISNU for thirty years and was the one who set its course as a teachers college until the 1960s. Felmley believed that everyone deserved a high school education, even those who did not plan to attend college or university. Felmley wanted the school to focus on pedagogy and professional teacher preparation, and was thus unconcerned with faculty credentials.

=== Fight for normal schools ===
One of Felmley's main concerns, as well as his main point of conflict with the University of Illinois, was the position and existence of normal schools in Illinois. They suffered from persistent underfunding and were at risk of being relegated due to other state universities and private colleges offering teaching degrees. Felmley argued that the teachers colleges and normal schools, which often recruited and educated students from less privileged backgrounds, were the best institutions for training secondary school teachers. Felmley led the charge to turn normal schools in Illinois into four year baccalaureate institutions.

=== Political influence ===
Felmley's political affiliation and influence defined his time at ISNU. He was the first Democrat to hold the office of president at the university and supported the right of the faculty to hold and express their individual political beliefs. It was also suspected by former president John W. Cook that Felmley's vocal support of William Jennings Bryan in 1896 led to the delay in his presidency after Cook's resignation.

His political beliefs also influenced his hiring of faculty. In 1927, Felmley hired John A. Kinneman to join the university faculty despite the controversy that surrounded Kinneman's outspoken support of the West Chester State Normal School's Liberal Club and his defense of their meetings that led to him being fired.

=== Changes implemented ===
In 1907, ISNU was converted into a four-year baccalaureate institution, issuing bachelors of education degrees to its graduates. The university also began to offer more specialized curriculums for teachers in agriculture, manual arts, domestic science, and commerce, along with adding new programs to home economics and industrial arts. New buildings were also constructed on the campus, known today as Edwards Hall, Fell Hall, McCormick Hall, and Moulton Hall.

Felmley supported the adoption of the metric system, reform of the university calendar, and the use of simplified spelling in all university publications.

=== Faculty ===
Felmley oversaw the beginnings of a more diverse faculty, hiring several Latino instructors to teach Spanish and potentially the first Jewish faculty member as well. He also fought for increasing the salaries of faculty at the university after World War I due to post-war inflation and the disparity in salary between ISNU and the University of Illinois.

=== Students ===
One of the main issues Felmley confronted was enrollment. The enrollment rate of the university was a consistent issue, especially after more normal schools opened in DeKalb, Macomb, and Charleston. Enrollment was also strongly affected by World War I, which saw low numbers of men in the normal department and extracurricular activities replaced by civilian war service, such as volunteering with the Red Cross.

After ISNU became a four-year institution, Felmley only intended four year programs to have men enrolled in them. Felmley did not see the point of offering elementary school teachers more than two years of education at ISNU, as the vast majority of them were younger women who he believed would “not remain in the work longer than five years."

== Death ==
Shortly before his death, Felmley submitted his resignation as president of ISNU to the Normal School Board due to his physical health. Felmley had been dealing with prolonged illness for about fourteen months prior to his death. His condition had been considered critical in the week before his death, and in the hours before his death he was unconscious.

Felmley died on January 24, 1930, in his home in Normal. After his death, ISNU students volunteered to guard his body as it lay in repose on campus prior to burial. He was buried in Carrollton City Cemetery in Carrollton, Illinois.

== Legacy ==
To this day, Felmley is the longest-serving president of Illinois State University. There is a building named after him on campus, the Felmley Hall of Science.

Academic offices
Preceded by Arnold Tompkins	President of Illinois State Normal University; 1900 – 1930	Succeeded by Harry A. Brown
