= Arnold Tompkins =

Biography

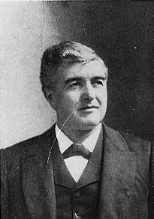

Fifth President of Illinois State Normal University
- In office 1899–1900
- Preceded by: John Williston Cook
- Succeeded by: David Felmley

Personal details
- Born: September 1, 1849 Edgar County, Illinois
- Died: July 15, 1922 (aged 16) Menlo, Georgia

Arnold Tompkins (1849–1905) was an American educator and university president in the late nineteenth and early twentieth centuries, most known for his work at Illinois State Normal University and Chicago Normal School.

== Early life ==
Tompkins was born on September 1, 1849, in Edgar County, Illinois. He had brief stints at Indiana University and Butler University before enrolling in and graduating from the Indiana State Normal School in 1880 at the age of 31.

== Educator ==
Tompkins taught in Worthington, Indiana, from 1880 to 1882, after which he became the superintendent of schools in Franklin, Indiana. In 1885, he went to DePauw University, serving as the head of the English program and working in the normal department. Tompkins moved to the normal school at Terre Haute as an English teacher in 1890, then departed three years later to become a student at the University of Chicago for two years. In 1895, he became a professor of pedagogy at the University of Illinois.

Tompkins published several books related to education and pedagogy, such as A Graded Course of Study for the Franklin Public Schools (1883), The Science of Discourse (1889), The Philosophy of Teaching (1893), and The Philosophy of School Management (1895).

As an educator, Tompkins also traveled all over the United States to give lectures and address educational meetings, garnering himself a national reputation.

== University presidencies ==
=== Illinois State Normal University ===
Tompkins came to ISNU after John W. Cook left to become the president at the Dekalb Normal School in 1899. Under Tompkins, the curriculum at ISNU saw several major changes. There were changes in credit hours, specialized electives offered to students, timelines based on the high school students previously attended, and other minor changes in order to professionalize the curriculum. He also worked to strengthen the faculty and improve the curriculum to better prepare students to become high school teachers.

=== Chicago Normal School ===
In 1900, after ten months, Tompkins left ISNU and became the president of the Chicago Normal School, which today is split into Chicago State University and Northeastern Illinois University. Tompkins said he left the school because the Chicago school would have better facilities and opportunities for him to truly accomplish what he wanted in education. Upon his arrival at the school, Tompkins found a host of issues he had to contend with. There was a surplus of teachers, a long list of incoming cadets, a newly intensified courseload for students, and financial shortages. However, Tompkins did not let this faze him, and continued to work hard to bring the school success.

== Death ==
Tompkins died on August 14, 1905, in Menlo, Georgia, while on vacation from his job at the Chicago Normal School. He was buried in the Alpine Community Church Cemetery in Menlo, Georgia.

Academic offices
Preceded by John Williston Cook	President of Illinois State Normal University; 1899 – 1900	Succeeded by David Felmley
