= Richard Edwards (educator) =

Welsh-American educator (1822–1908)

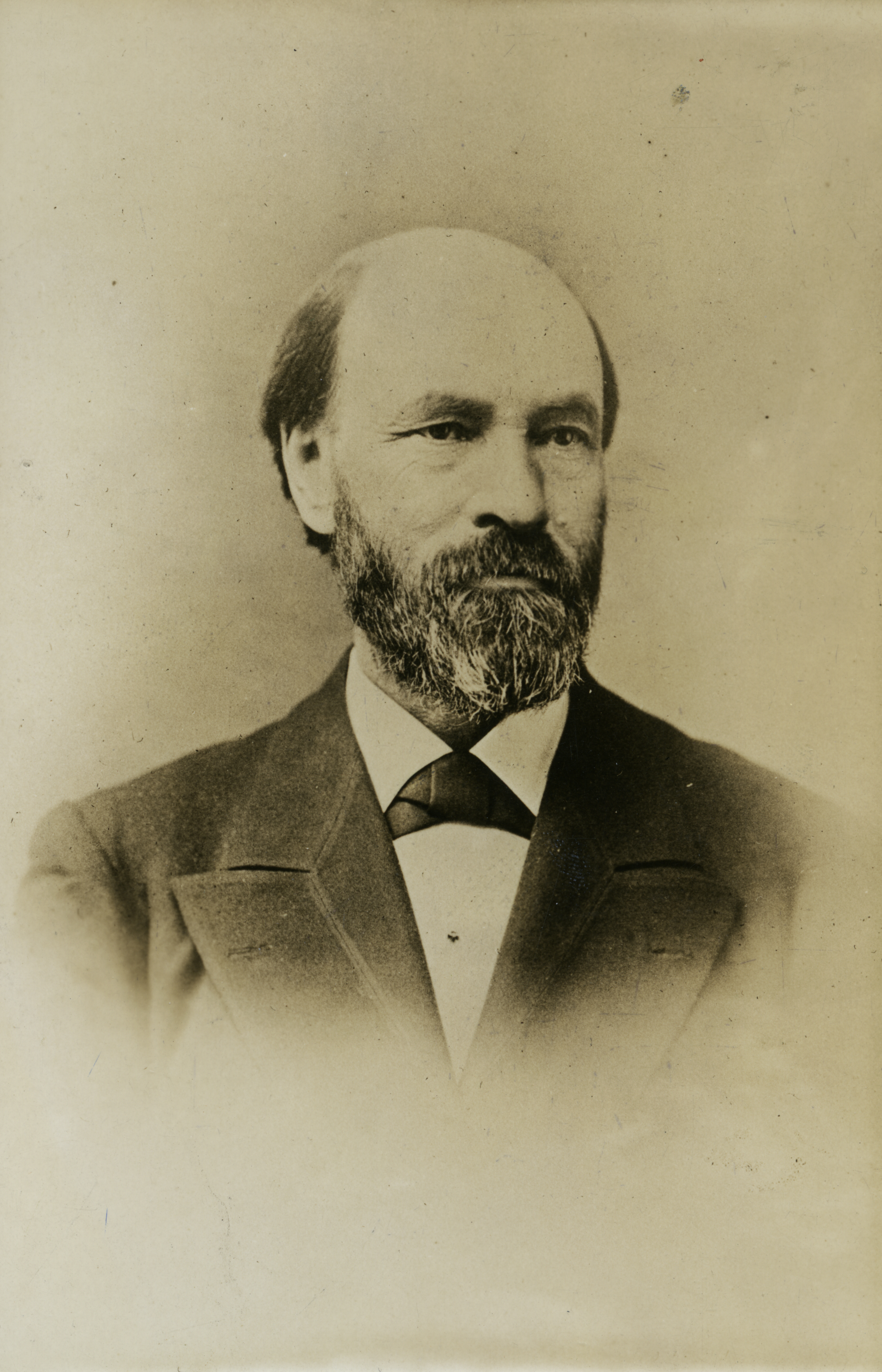

Third President of Blackburn College
- In office 1891–1893
- Preceded by: Edwin L. Hurd
- Succeeded by: James E. Rogers

Illinois Superintendent of Public Instruction
- In office 1887–1891
- Governor: Richard J. Oglesby; Joseph W. Fifer
- Preceded by: Henry Raab
- Succeeded by: Henry Raab

Second President of Illinois State Normal University
- In office 1862–1876
- Preceded by: Charles Edward Hovey
- Succeeded by: Edwin C. Hewett

First principal of the Salem Normal School
- In office 1854–1857
- Preceded by: Position created
- Succeeded by: Alpheus Crosby

Personal details
- Born: December 23, 1822 Ceredigion, Cardiganshire, Wales
- Died: March 7, 1908 (aged 85) Normal, Illinois, US

Richard Edwards (December 23, 1822 – March 7, 1908) was a Welsh-American educator from Ceredigion (Cardiganshire). After emigrating to the United States with his family when he was a child, Edwards studied at the State Normal School in Bridgewater, Massachusetts and Rensselaer Polytechnic Institute in Troy, New York. He then led a number of schools: the Boys' High School in Salem, Massachusetts (1853–1854); the State Normal School in Salem (1854–1857); the Normal School in St. Louis, Missouri (1857–1861); Illinois State Normal University (1862–1876); and Blackburn University(1891–1893). From 1887 to 1891, he served as the Illinois Superintendent of Public Instruction.

== Early life ==
Richard Edwards was born in Lledrod, Wales, on December 23, 1822. The son of Richard and Ann (Jones), Edwards was raised on the family farm until his family immigrated to the United States in 1833, settling in Ohio. In October 1844, Edwards took a teaching job, and after one term he enrolled in the State Normal School in Bridgewater, Massachusetts. He then studied and taught at Rensselaer Polytechnic Institute in Troy, New York. Edwards married Betsey J. Samson on July 5, 1849, and they had nine children together. Edwards graduated from the Bridgewater Normal in 1846 and taught there from 1848 until 1853.

== Teaching ==
In 1848, he returned to the State Normal School in Bridgewater to teach astronomy, physics, map-drawing, and geography. Five years later, he was named principal of the Boys' High School in Salem, Massachusetts, and in 1854, Edwards was named principal of the State Normal School in Salem. In 1857, Edwards agreed to become the principal of the Normal School in St. Louis, Missouri and led the school for four years, then was elected principal of St. Louis High School.

He received an honorary Master of the Arts degree from Harvard University in 1863, followed by an honorary Legum Doctor from Shurtleff College in 1867.

=== Time at Illinois State University ===
Aware of his skill managing normal schools, the Illinois State Normal University in Bloomington, Illinois recruited Edwards in 1862. Edwards was elected chair of the mathematics department in May, then became president of the university that June.

Edwards' presidency at Illinois State began the "Bridgewater Era," a span of three presidencies with men educated under the Bridgewater Normal methodology. Edwards led the university until he resigned in January 1876. Under his guidance, the number of students had increased from 285 to 780. Edwards' work on the curriculum of the university was a combination of elementary, secondary, and college-level education intended to hone the basic skills and knowledge of the teachers-in-training, turning the school into a "people's university" as opposed to a "genuine normal school."

Edwards was outspoken in his beliefs in coeducation and women’s rights, especially during his time at ISNU. Edwards was an abolitionist who, as early as 1863, was advocating for the inclusion of African-American children in the normal school. He argued that the function of a public school was to educate everyone, and he would greatly protest if he was not allowed to when the decision to admit a young African-American girl to the model school arose in 1867.

== Later years ==
Edwards then became pastor of the Congregational Church of Princeton, Illinois; he had been ordained as a minister three years earlier. He resigned in 1884 to become financial agent for Knox College. In 1887, he was elected as a Republican as the Illinois Superintendent of Public Instruction, serving for four years. He then accepted the presidency of Blackburn University, who bestowed an honorary Doctor of Divinity upon him the same year. He returned to Bloomington in 1893, occasionally working with Illinois Wesleyan University. He became a member of the Illinois Industrial League in 1858. In 1862, he joined the Illinois Natural History Society and the Illinois State Teachers' Association. He led the latter group as president in 1863 and 1864. He died on March 7, 1908, and was buried in Evergreen Memorial Cemetery in Bloomington.

== Legacy ==
A building at Illinois State University named "Edwards Hall" was opened in 1920. It houses the Mennonite College of Nursing and Capen Auditorium.

== Notes ==
Academic offices
New title	1st Principal of the Salem Normal School; 1854 – 1857	Succeeded by Alpheus Crosby
Preceded by Charles Edward Hovey	2nd President of Illinois State Normal University; 1862 – 1876	Succeeded by Edwin C. Hewett
Preceded by Edwin L. Hurd	3rd President of Blackburn College; 1891 – 1893	Succeeded by James E. Rogers
Political offices
Preceded by Henry Raab	Illinois Superintendent of Public Instruction; 1887 – 1891	Succeeded by Henry Raab
