= Thomas F. Holgate =

Canadian-born American mathematician and academic administrator

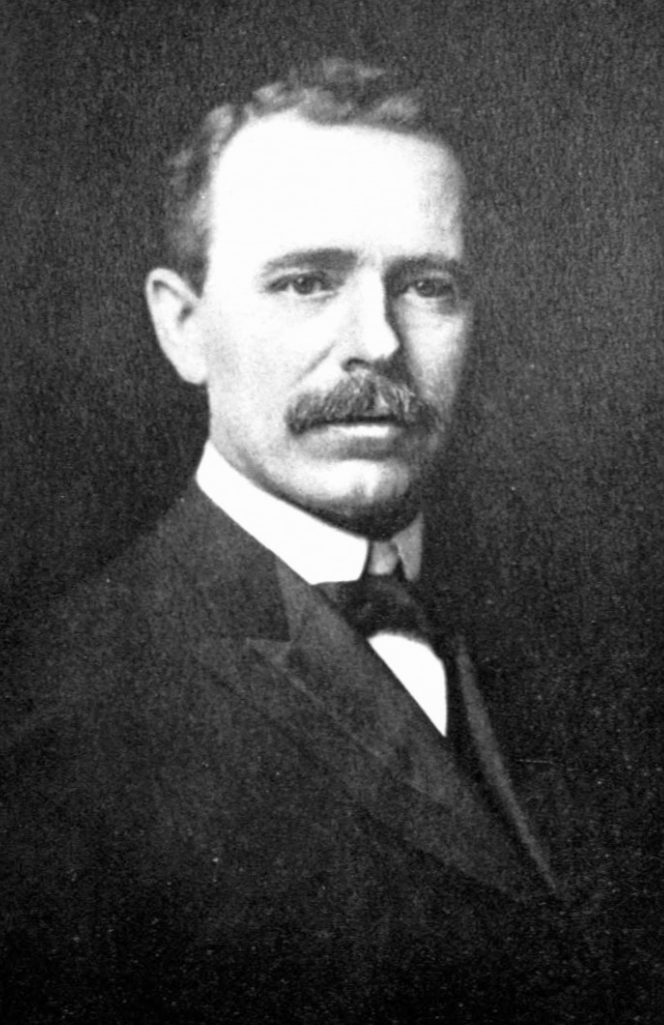

Interim President of Northwestern University
- In office 1916–1919
- Preceded by: Abram W. Harris
- Succeeded by: Lynn Hough
- In office 1904–1906
- Preceded by: Edmund J. James
- Succeeded by: Abram W. Harris

Personal details
- Born: Thomas Franklin Holgate; April 8, 1859 Hastings County, United Province of Canada
- Died: April 11, 1945 (aged 86) Evanston, Illinois, U.S.
- Resting place: Rosehill Cemetery
- Education: University of Toronto; Clark University
- Occupation: Mathematician, academic administrator

Thomas Franklin Holgate (1859–1945) was a Canadian-born American mathematician and academic administrator. He served as the interim president of Northwestern University from 1904 to 1906 and from 1916 to 1919.

== Early life ==
Thomas F. Holgate was born on April 8, 1859, in Hastings County, United Province of Canada. He graduated from the University of Toronto with a bachelor's degree in 1884 and a master's degree in 1889. He earned a PhD in Mathematics from Clark University in 1893.

== Career ==
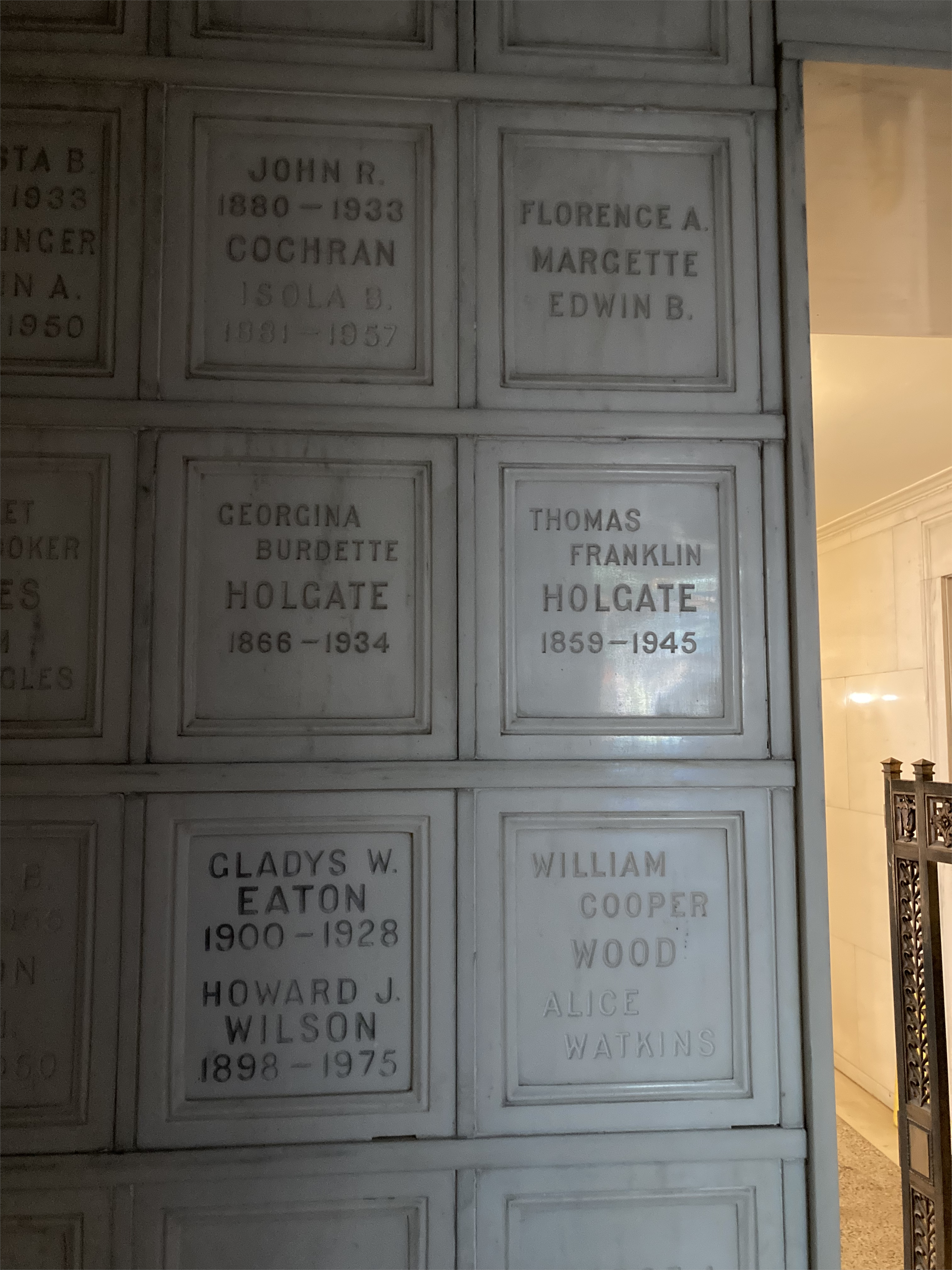
Holgate's grave at Rosehill Mausoleum

Holgate joined the faculty at Northwestern University in 1893. He served as its president from 1904 to 1906, and from 1916 to 1919.

== Death and legacy ==
Holgate died at his home in Evanston on April 11, 1945. He was interred at Rosehill Mausoleum in Rosehill Cemetery. The Thomas F. Holgate Library on the campus of Bennett College was named in his honor.
