= Charles Edward Hovey =

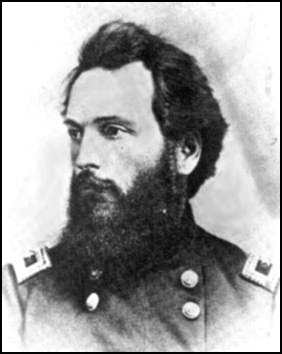
- Charles Edward Hovey

First president of Illinois State Normal University
- In office 1857–1861
- Succeeded by: Richard Edwards

Personal details
- Born: April 26, 1827 Thetford, Vermont, U.S.
- Died: November 17, 1897 (aged 70) Washington, D.C., U.S.
- Resting place: Arlington National Cemetery

Military service
- Allegiance: United States; Union
- Branch/service: United States Army; Union Army
- Rank: Brigadier general
- Battles/wars: American Civil War

Charles Edward Hovey (April 26, 1827 – November 17, 1897) was an educator, college president, pension lobbyist and a brevet major general in the United States Army during the American Civil War.

== Early life ==
Hovey was born in Thetford, Vermont, on April 26, 1827, to Alfred and Abigail Hovey (nee Howard). At the age of fifteen, he began teaching in Vermont before becoming a lumberjack for a short time. In 1848, he enrolled in Dartmouth to pursue his college degree, teaching during the summer to help pay for his education. He graduated from Dartmouth in 1852. He briefly studied law and taught school in Framingham, Massachusetts, becoming the principal of the Framingham Academy and High School.

Hovey moved to Illinois after his time at the Framingham Academy, where he served as principal and then superintendent of schools in Peoria. He became president of the Illinois State Teacher's Association and a member of the first Illinois State Board of Education. He assisted in the organization of Illinois State University, then known as Illinois State Normal University, serving as president of the university from 1857 to 1861.

He was married to Harriette Farnham (Spofford) Hovey of Nantucket, Massachusetts, and together had three children: Edward, Alfred, and Richard. Their son Richard Hovey became a well-known poet, artist, and college professor. A distant cousin, Alvin Peterson Hovey, also served as a Civil War general.

== Military career ==
When the Civil War erupted in 1861, Hovey resigned from the university at the end of the school year and raised the 33rd Illinois Infantry, a regiment organized in McLean County and largely comprising teachers and former students from his school. He was commissioned colonel on August 15, 1861, and took the regiment to Missouri, where it saw service in a number of small actions during the winter. At the Battle of Cotton Plant in July 1862, Hovey's badly outnumbered Illinois and Wisconsin infantry repeatedly repulsed a series of poorly organized attacks by Confederate Col. William H. Parsons's two Texas cavalry regiments.

Hovey was appointed a brigadier general of volunteers to rank from September 5, 1862; however, the U.S. Senate did not to act upon his nomination within the statuary period, and it expired by law March 4, 1863. In the interim, he played a key role in the capture of Arkansas Post in January 1863, where William T. Sherman reported that Hovey had been "wounded in his arm by a shell, but continued and still continues to command his Brigade." Suffering lingering effects from his injury, Hovey soon left the field service. With the close of the war, he was given a brevet promotion to major general "for gallant and meritorious conduct in battle, particularly at Arkansas Post, January 11, 1863."

== Later years ==
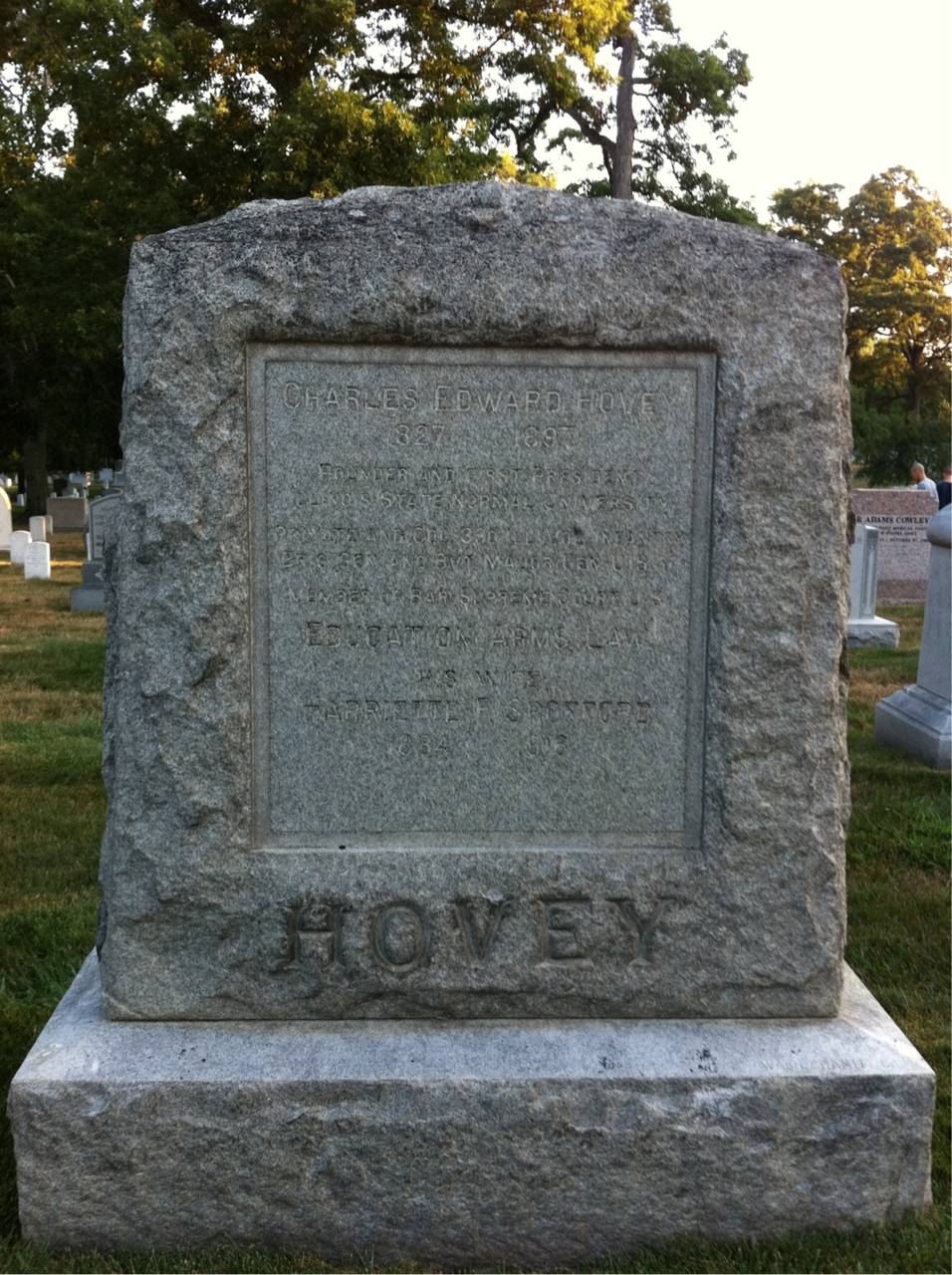
Hovey's gravestone in Arlington National Cemetery.

After the war, Hovey and his wife lived in Washington, D.C. Having once briefly studied law, he became a successful pension lobbyist and practicing attorney. He died in Washington, D.C., on November 17, 1897, and was buried with full military honors in Arlington National Cemetery.

== Legacy ==
A building at Illinois State University was renamed "Hovey Hall" in 1959 in honor of Charles E. Hovey. It houses administrative offices, including the Office of the President.

A major street going through Bloomington-Normal is named "Hovey Avenue" after him.

== See also ==
- List of American Civil War generals (Union)

== Notes ==
Academic offices
New office	President of Illinois State Normal University; 1857 – 1861	Succeeded by Richard Edwards
