= David Kinley =

Scotland-born economist

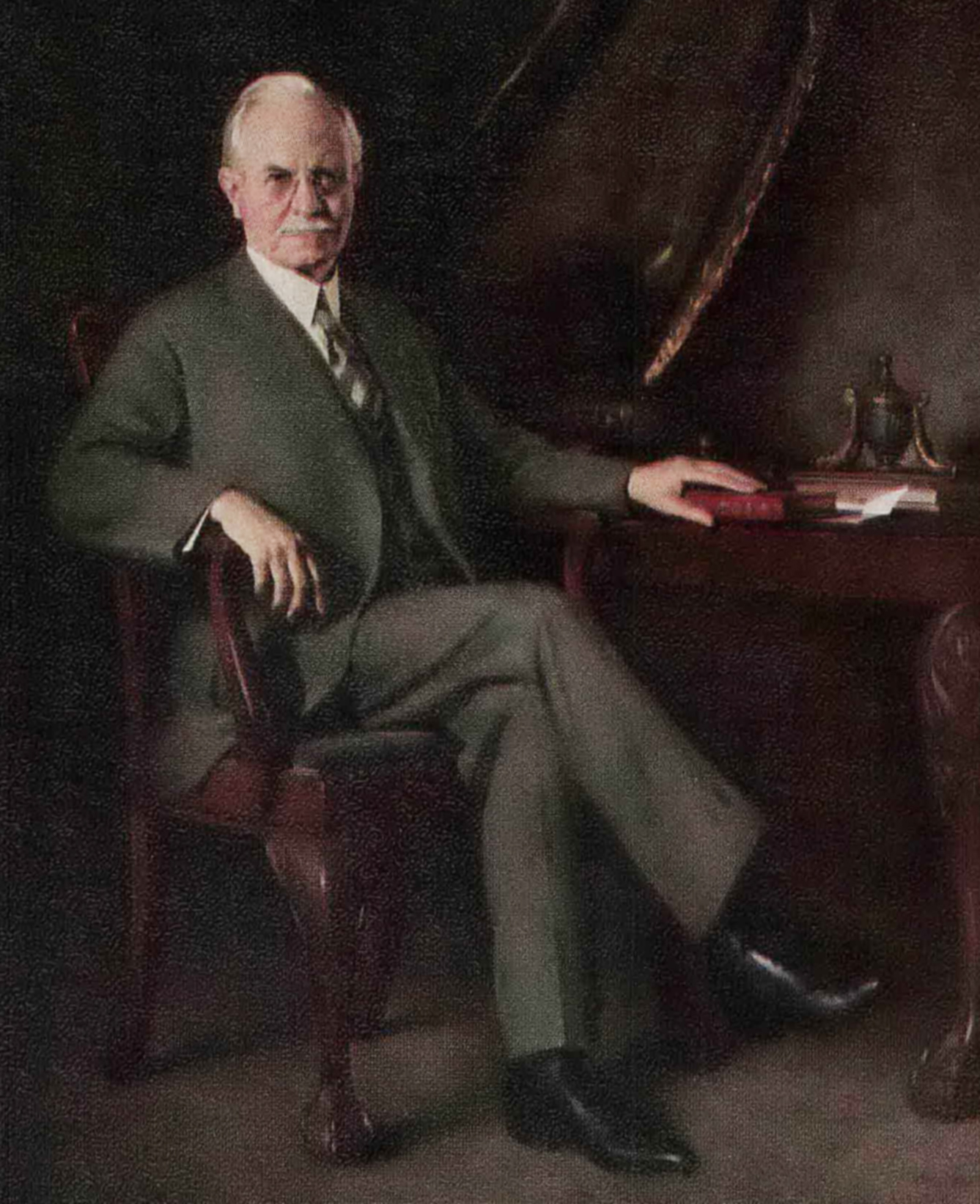
- 1926 portrait of Kinley

6th President of the University of Illinois system
- In office 1920–1930
- Preceded by: Edmund J. James
- Succeeded by: Harry Woodburn Chase

Personal details
- Born: 2 August 1861 Dundee, Scotland
- Died: 3 December 1944 (aged 83) Urbana, Illinois, US
- Profession: Economist; college administrator

Academic background
- Education: Phillips Andover Academy; Yale University; Johns Hopkins University; University of Wisconsin
- Thesis: The Independent Treasury of the United States (1893)
- Doctoral advisor: Richard T. Ely

David Kinley (2 August 1861 – 3 December 1944) was a Scotland-born economist who worked in the United States. He was head of the department of economics of the University of Illinois and later president of the university. As an economist, he was of the classical school, and his main interest was in money and banking. Administration gradually took up most of his time as his career progressed.

== Biography ==
Kinley was born in Dundee, Scotland. He emigrated to the United States with his family in 1872. He received his early education at Phillips Andover Academy in Andover, Massachusetts, and from there went to Yale University where he graduated in 1884. He then became principal of North Andover High School for six years. In 1890, he left to do graduate work at Johns Hopkins University, primarily under Richard Ely. He accompanied Ely to the University of Wisconsin where he received his PhD in 1893.

That same year, he became assistant professor of economics at the University of Illinois. In 1894, he was appointed full professor, head of the department of economics and dean of the college of literature and arts. Later he became dean of the graduate school. He was head of the department of economics until 1915.

Along with his responsibilities as dean, he directed the "Training for Business" courses which he organized into a college of commerce and business administration. He became vice-president of the University of Illinois, then acting president, and finally, in 1920, president.

He served with the Illinois Industrial Insurance Company (1906–7) and the Illinois Tax Commission (1910 and 1930). He was an envoy on the government's behalf to various international conferences, and was a member of numerous committees. As a classical economist, in his presidential address of 1914 before the American Economic Association he expressed his concern that once government involved itself in attempting to control economic activity, the ruling classes would move to other spheres of human endeavor, suchnas religion and politics.

== Writings ==
His publications include The Independent Treasury of the United States, his doctoral dissertation (1893), and a report to the Comptroller of the Currency on The Use of Credit Paper in Our Currency, published in the Report of the Comptroller for the year 1896. In 1904, he wrote "Money". Following the Panic of 1907, he continued his work for the Comptroller with two monographs prepared at the request of a national monetary commission: "The Independent Treasury of the United States and Its Relation to the Banks of the Country" and "The Use of Credit Instruments in Payments in the United States." The University of Illinois Press published Kinley's autobiography posthumously in 1949.

== Personal life ==
He married Kate Ruth Neal in 1897. She died in 1931 in Hong Kong while accompanying Kinley on a professional trip.
