= Karl Volkmar Stoy =

German educator and pedagogue (1815–1885)

Karl Volkmar Stoy (22 January 1815, Pegau - 23 January 1885, Jena) was a German educator and pedagogue, representing Herbartian pedagogy.

== Biography ==
Karl Volkmar Stoy was born on 22 January 1815, in Pegau, the son of Karl Gottlob Stoy, the archdeacon of Pegau. He received his early education at the prestigious St. Afra Latin School in Meißen, where he excelled in his studies. At 18, he enrolled in the University of Leipzig to pursue a theology, philology, and philosophy degree. His academic achievements were recognized with a doctorate in philosophy in 1837.

Stoy's intellectual journey continued to Göttingen, where he came under the tutelage of the renowned philosopher Johann Friedrich Herbart. This encounter profoundly impacted Stoy's thinking, shaping his views on education and pedagogy.

In 1839, Stoy began teaching at the educational institution founded by Karl Friedrich Bender in Weinheim. His passion for education was evident in his approach, emphasizing practical experiences and hands-on learning.

In 1843, Stoy's academic pursuits led him to the University of Jena, where he obtained his habilitation and became a private lecturer. A significant turning point came in 1844 when he took over the private boys' educational institution established by the late Ernst August Heinrich Heimburg. This institution encompassed an alumni association, an elementary school, a secondary school branch, and a gymnasium branch.

Stoy's vision extended beyond the confines of the traditional classroom. The same year, he established a pedagogical seminary with an attached elementary school, effectively merging theoretical and practical teacher training. His dedication to education was further recognized in 1845, when he was appointed associate professor, and in 1857, when he became Grand Ducal Saxon School Councilor and Honorary Professor.

Stoy's reputation as an educator reached new heights in 1865 when he was called upon to fill the newly created chair of pedagogy at the University of Heidelberg. This prestigious appointment necessitated the dissolution of his Jena institutions between 1866 and 1868.

Stoy's commitment to his Jena roots remained strong despite relocating to Heidelberg. In 1867, he took a temporary leave of absence to establish an evangelical teacher's seminary in Bielitz, in the Austrian part of Silesia.

In 1874, Stoy returned to Jena, resigning his position in Heidelberg. He resumed his role as honorary professor of pedagogy and re-established the pedagogical seminary. In 1880, his son Johann Heinrich Stoy took over the management of the educational institution.

Stoy's involvement in education extended beyond his academic and institutional contributions. He actively participated in the Association for Scientific Pedagogy, serving as its vice-chairman from 1870 onwards. However, in 1876, he stepped down due to a persistent disagreement with the association's chairman, Tuiskon Ziller, regarding publication matters.

On January 23, 1885, just one day after his 70th birthday, Karl Volkmar Stoy died in Jena. He left behind a legacy, having dedicated his life to advancing the field of education and shaping the minds of countless individuals. His contributions continue to resonate today, inspiring educators and educational institutions worldwide.

== Publications ==
- Der pädagogischen Bekenntnisse erstes bis neuntes Stück. Jena 1844–1880.
- Hauspädagogik in Monologen und Ansprachen. Eine Neujahrsgabe an die Mütter. Leipzig 1855.
- Encyklopädie, Methodologie und Literatur der Pädagogik. Leipzig 2. Auflage 1878.
