= Charles Alexander McMurry =

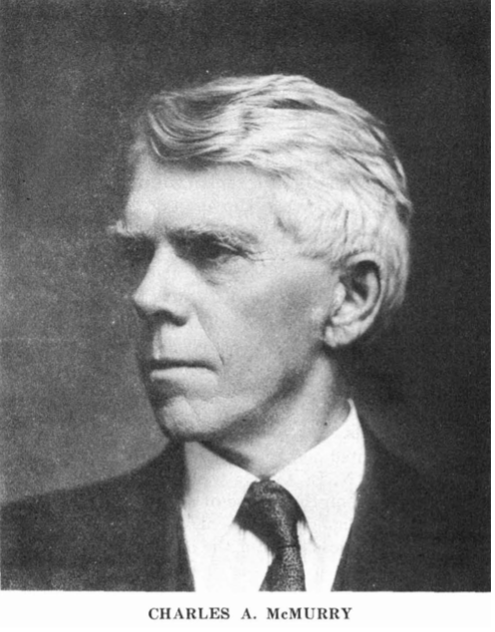
Photograph of Charles A. McMurry, date unknown

Charles Alexander McMurry (1857–1929) was an American educator, pioneer in American Herbartianism, and brother to Frank Morton McMurry.

== Early life ==
In 1857, McMurry was born in Crawfordsville, Indiana, but following the premature death of his father, his mother moved the family to rural Illinois where he and his siblings would begin attending Normal schools, specifically in Normal, Illinois. This is where Charles McMurry would meet Edmund J. James, a prominent educational figure in economics and academia throughout Illinois universities and schools.

== Education and Herbartianism ==
McMurry enrolled in the classical training school at Illinois State Normal University, where he graduated in 1876. He went on to study at the University of Michigan (1876-1878). Upon his graduation, McMurry began to teach in rural Illinois schools, but after two years, he moved to Littleton, Colorado and Denver, Colorado, where he taught for two additional years. During his stint in Colorado, McMurry was influenced by the works of Tuiskon Ziller, a German Herbartianist of the University of Leipzig, and began translating his educational works into English and publishing them in the Illinois School Journal. Influenced by John W. Cook, Charles De Garmo, Edmund James, and his brother, Frank Morton McMurry, he returned to Illinois.

In 1886, McMurry traveled to Halle, Germany to continue his education. He completed his Ph.D. in Halle in 1887 and brought back the teachings of German Herbartianist, Willheim Rein to the United States.

McMurry began to incorporate Herbartianist teaching pedagogy into his own classrooms in Illinois, specifically in Evanston, Illinois (1888) and at the Winona State Normal School in Winona, Minnesota (1889).

In 1889, Charles McMurry returned to Normal and began teaching as an assistant of the training school at Illinois State Normal University. This is where he, his brother Frank and Charles DeGarmo, alongside many other prominent adherents of Herbartianism established the National Herbart Club in 1892. The establishment of the National Herbart Club allowed for teachers, faculty, and students to participate in discussion of education and how to instruct Herbartian practices. Participation of the club in National Education Association meetings helped solidify Illinois State as the Herbartian capital of the United States, as information discussed within NEA meetings began to spread throughout normal schools across the United States.

In 1895, members of the National Herbart Club established the National Herbart Society for the Scientific Study of Education (NHS), marking the height of Herbartian educational influence in the United States. Shortly after the establishment of the NHS, McMurry began to compile various works of Herbartian educational instruction from faculty at ISNU, to create The First Supplement to the Yearbook of the National Herbart Society in 1895. The "yearbook" was rather a symposium for faculty and students at ISNU to engage in academic conversation in regards to early childhood education, secondary education, and post-secondary education, though its publication and distribution impacted educational institutions across the United States.

In 1899, Charles McMurry helped establish an education program for teaching at Northern Illinois State Normal School, where he served as director of educational instruction under John W. Cook. McMurry Hall on the NIU campus is named after him and his sister-in law, Lida Brown McMurry. His success as an early pioneer of Herbartianism in the United States allowed him to teach across the country.

He taught Herbartianism in summer schools throughout the nation, most notably at the University of Chicago, Columbia University, Vanderbilt University, and Cornell University.

McMurry taught and wrote about various ideologies of education, but is most notable for his work in Herbartianism. He authored and submitted over one hundred fifty works in seven hundred sixty-nine publications, until his death in 1929.

== Published works ==
- The Elements of General Method (1892; sixth edition, revised, 1903)
- Method of the Recitation (1898), with F. M. McMurry
- Special Method of Reading (1898; new edition, 1910)
- Special Method in Literature and History (1898)
- Special Method in Geography (1898)
- Special Method in Natural Science (1896; second edition, 1899)
- Pioneer History Stories (three volumes, 1891; fifth edition, 1898)
- Special Method in Primary Reading and Oral Work (1903)
- Special Method in Reading in the Grades (1908)
- Handbook of Practice for Teachers (1914)
- Conflicting Principles of Teaching and How to Adjust them (1915)
