= John Williston Cook =

American educator and university administrator (1844–1922)

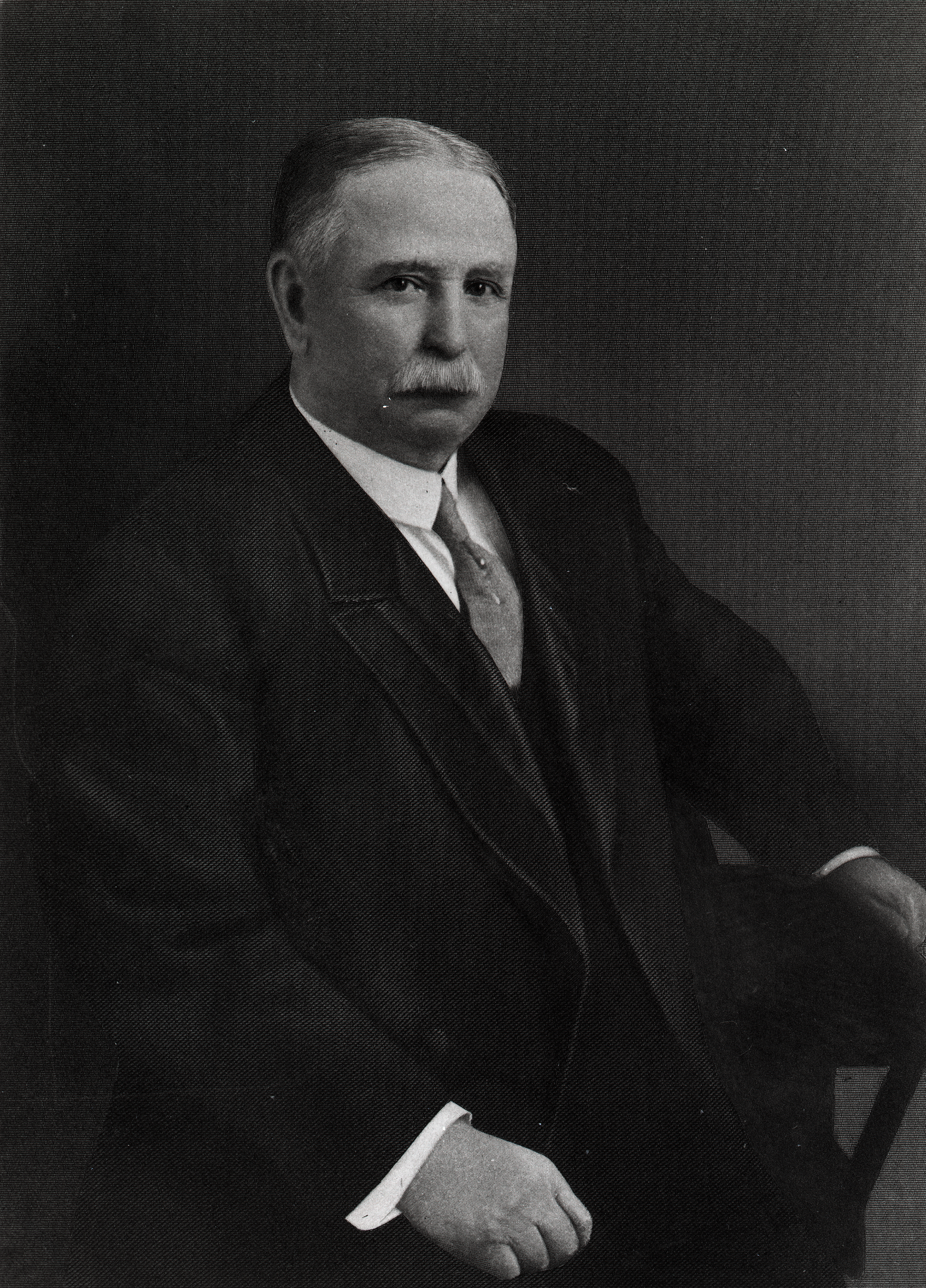

Fourth President of Illinois State Normal University
- In office 1890–1899
- Preceded by: Edwin C. Hewett
- Succeeded by: Arnold Tompkins

Personal details
- Born: April 20, 1844 Oneida County, New York
- Died: July 15, 1922 (aged 78) Chicago, Illinois

John Williston Cook (April 20, 1844 – July 15, 1922) was an educator during the late nineteenth and early twentieth centuries in the United States, specifically in Illinois. His work in education, specifically in association with the Herbartianism movement, had a lasting impact on the field at the time.

== Early life ==
Cook was born on April 20, 1844, in Oneida County, New York. He moved to McLean County, Illinois, with his family in 1851. He attended Illinois State Normal University prior to his time as a faculty member, graduating in 1865. He taught for one year in Brimfield, Illinois, before returning to Normal and becoming the principal of the model school associated with ISNU. In 1867 he became married to Lydia Spafford.

== Professor and university president ==
=== Illinois State University ===
In 1868, Cook joined the ISNU faculty as the professor of history and geography. In 1869, he became the professor of reading and elocution, and in 1876 was made the professor of mathematics. In 1890, Cook was appointed president of the university. As president, Cook advocated for the construction of a gymnasium on campus, and in 1895 the Illinois legislature appropriated $40,000 for the construction of the gymnasium, later renamed John W. Cook Hall. Cook was president of the university when it broke its tradition of free tuition and instituted a fee of two dollars per term starting in December 1898. Cook resigned from ISNU in 1899.

=== Herbartianism at Illinois State Normal University ===
By 1890, ISNU became the national center of Herbartianism, a pedagogical movement of reform for education in elementary schools. Cook encouraged ISNU graduates, both of the university and model school, to continue their education beyond the campus in order to strengthen their training as teachers, and heavily supported the faculty’s study of Herbartianism. Students such as Frank Morton McMurry, Charles Alexander McMurry and Charles DeGarmo took Cook's advice and studied abroad in Halle and Jena, Germany.

In 1893, the Normal Pedagogical Club was founded and Cook was elected president, while Charles McMurry served as secretary. This club, along with the Herbart Club

Cook's lack of discrimination of educational theories and practices facilitated the growth of Herbartianism at ISNU. In an 1898 letter to David Felmley, Cook stated, "As to whether I am a Herbartian or not, is a matter of no consequence of course. In some respects I find myself greatly influenced by his [Herbart] ideas, while in other directions I find myself not aroused at all."

=== Northern Illinois University ===
In 1899, Cook began his career at the Dekalb Normal School, which would later become Northern Illinois University. He served as president of NIU from 1899 to 1919. He was essential to the organization of the school, the hiring of the first faculty members, and establishing the base curriculum for students.

== Later life and death ==
Cook wrote the book Educational History of Illinois, published in 1912, which strongly featured ISNU. Cook died on July 15, 1922, in Chicago, Illinois. Cook is buried in Evergreen Memorial Cemetery located in Bloomington, Illinois.

== Legacy ==
There is a building named after Cook on the Illinois State University Campus, John W. Cook Hall, which is used predominantly by the School of Music. There is also a building on Northern Illinois University’s Campus, Williston Hall, named in his honor.

Academic offices
Preceded by Edwin C. Hewett	President of Illinois State Normal University; 1890 – 1899	Succeeded by Arnold Tompkins
