= Edwin C. Hewett =

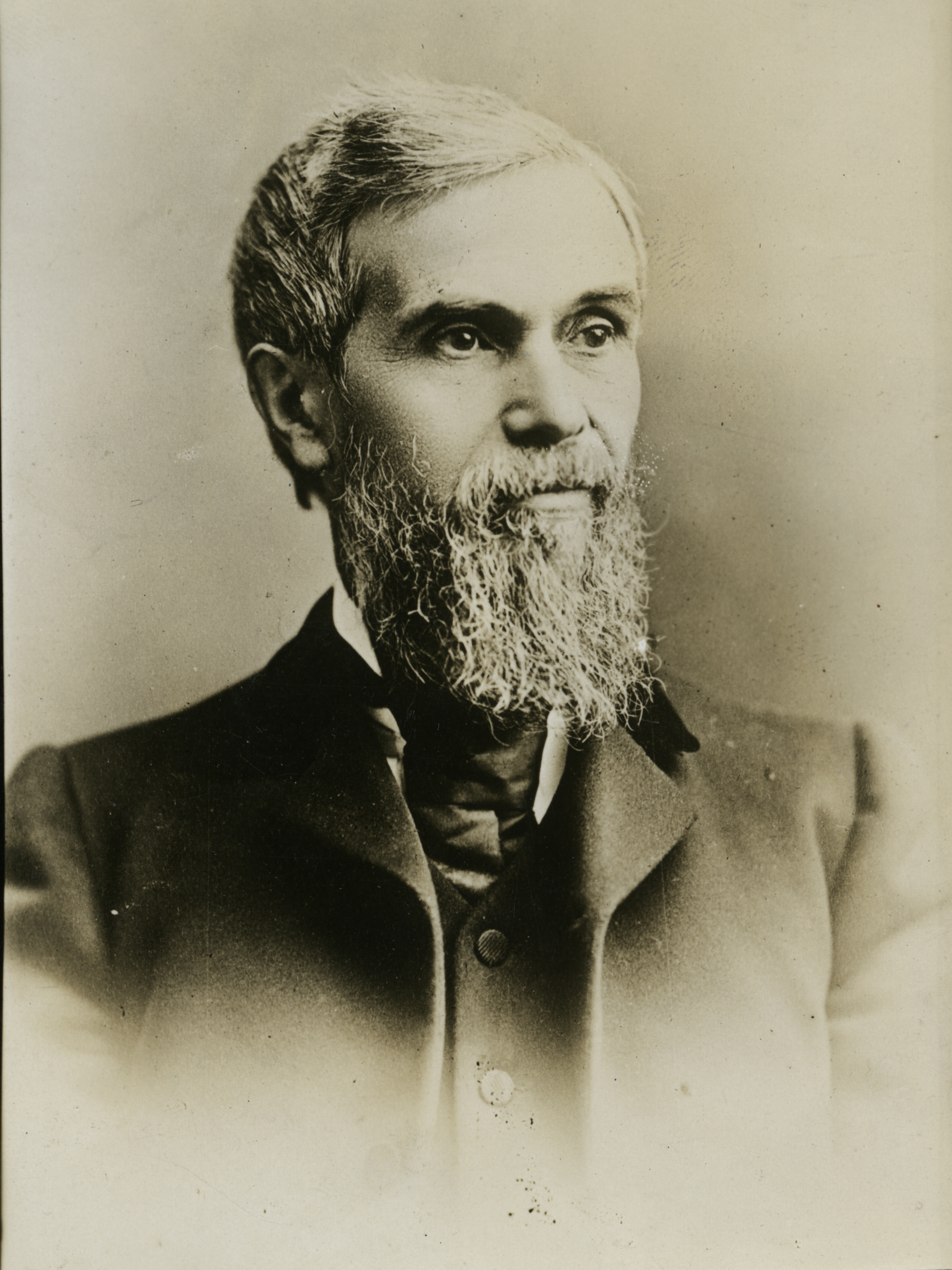

Third President of Illinois State Normal University
- In office 1876–1890
- Preceded by: Richard Edwards
- Succeeded by: John Williston Cook

Personal details
- Born: November 1, 1828 East Douglas, Massachusetts
- Died: March 31, 1905 (aged 76) Normal, Illinois

Edwin C. Hewett (November 1, 1828 – March 31, 1905) was a professor and president at Illinois State Normal University, now known as Illinois State University. He was a prominent president in the early years of the university and an outspoken advocate for equal education.

== Early life ==
Hewett was born on November 1, 1828, in East Douglas, Massachusetts. He was the oldest child of Timothy and Lavina Hewett, and grew up in the Congregationalist church. Prior to his teaching career, he was a shoemaker for eight years until the age of 21. After a short stint in teaching, he entered the State Normal School in Bridgewater, Massachusetts, graduating in 1852. While at Bridgewater, he was taught by Richard Edwards, the second president of Illinois State University, then known as a normal school in Bloomington, Illinois.

== Career ==
After he graduated, he worked at the Pittsfield, Massachusetts high school, the Bridgewater Normal School, and at a grammar school in Worcester, Massachusetts.

In 1858, Hewett was hired at Illinois State University as the professor of history and geography. He also taught classes in math, literature, psychology, pedagogy, and spelling. As a professor of history and geography, he had high expectations of his students, with assignments consisting of drawing each continent from memory and knowing the area of Patagonia in square miles. In January 1876, he was appointed president of the university, a position he held until his departure in 1890. One of the actions Hewett took as president was to reduce the academic year at the normal school to thirty-six weeks. Hewett also hired the university’s first full-time librarian, Angeline V. Milner.

Hewett supported the equal education of black children and white children, arguing in favor of allowing a black student to enter the model school in 1867. In 1870, Hewett debated suffragette Susan B. Anthony in Bloomington, raising the question “Is it best for the women of American that they should vote?”, and calling into question the motivations behind the university’s lack of female faculty, specifically professors, at this time.

Hewett was one of the editors of The Illinois Teacher, a journal published by the Illinois Teachers Association He later purchased the journal with Aaron Gove, merged it with the Chicago School Master, and renamed it the Illinois School Master. In 1878, Shurtleff College awarded him a Doctor of Laws degree. During the last four years of his presidency, he was also the treasurer of the National Education Association.

== Later life and death ==
After he left Illinois State, Hewett became an associate editor of “School and Home Education” up until his death. In 1896 he founded the University Center, now the Normal Literary Center, and held the position of president from 1897 to 1905. Hewett died on March 31, 1905, and is buried in the Evergreen Memorial Cemetery in Bloomington, Illinois.

== Personal life ==
In August 1857, he married Angeline N. Benton, with whom he had two children, Paul and May. Angeline died on November 21, 1895. He was remarried on August 31, 1898, to Helen E. Paisley, who outlived him by eighteen years.

In the early 1860s, Hewitt built a wooden frame house with Italianate and Greek Revival elements. It was designated a local landmark of the town of Normal on July 19, 1993; as of 2024, it serves as the Ecology Action Center.

== Legacy ==
A building on the Illinois State University campus is named after him. The building serves as a residence hall for students living on campus.

== Notes ==
Academic offices
Preceded by Richard Edwards	President of Illinois State Normal University; 1876 – 1890	Succeeded by John Williston Cook
