= Fairview Sanatorium =

- U.S. National Register of Historic Places
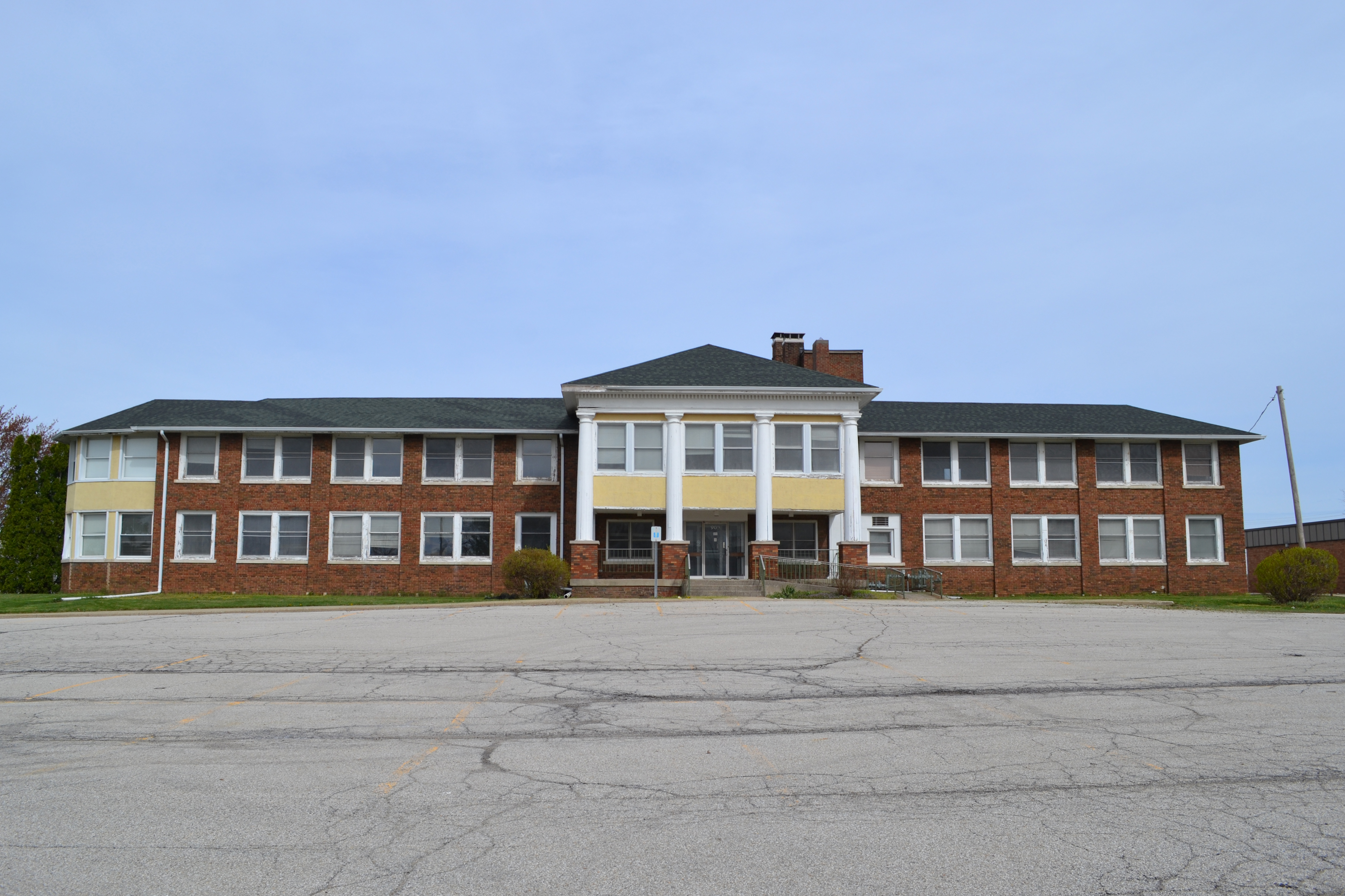
- Fairview Sanatorium, 2024

- Location within Illinois Location within the United States
- Location: 905 N. Main St., Normal, Illinois
- Coordinates: 40°31′25″N 88°59′45″W
- Built: 1919
- Architect: Arthur L. Pillsbury
- Architectural style: Colonial Revival
- NRHP reference No.: 100006867
- Added to NRHP: September 21, 2021

The Fairview Sanatorium is a former tuberculosis sanatorium at 905 North Main Street in Normal, Illinois.

== Architecture ==
Local architect Arthur L. Pillsbury designed the Colonial Revival building. It contains two floors in a W-shape. The hipped roof was originally shingled in clay tile.

As sunlight and fresh air were thought to be the best treatments for tuberculosis at the time, the rooms at the sanatorium featured large windows that were kept open for much of the year. The windows have limestone sills and flat steel lintels with brick. These rooms were unheated until 1930–1931.

The interior contains original terrazzo flooring, wainscoting, and water fountain surrounds. It also contains built-in wood cabinets.

== History ==
McLean County built the sanatorium in 1919 following a public referendum and a decade-long campaign by the McLean County Anti-Tuberculosis Society. The latter organization was spearheaded by Florence Fifer Bohrer, who was also the sanatorium's first secretary and went on to become the first woman elected to the Illinois Senate.

The supervisory committee purchased 40 acres in March 1917 for $15,000. The Fairview Sanatorium was completed in the summer of 1919. A dedication service took place on August 17, 1919 and the first patients were admitted two days later. The initial capacity was 34 patients.

During the 1920s, a separate cottage was built in the back, for the purpose of racially segregating patients. In 1922, a nurses' home was built on the second floor, increasing capacity to 52 patients.

In 1929, an x-ray machine was installed. In 1952 to 1953, 4,914 x-rays were taken.

In addition to housing up to 80 patients at a time, the sanatorium also served as the center of the county's public health campaign against tuberculosis, which included case tracking and public education. Improved treatments for tuberculosis gradually reduced the sanatorium's patient population over the following decades. When the sanitorium was opened, the death rate was 118 per 100,000; in 1933, the death rate was 34 and in 1952, the death rate was 8.

Fairview closed as a tuberculosis facility in 1965.

The building was used by the McLean County Health Department until the department moved downtown in the 1990s; the building was closed in 2012. It has since been used a storage site for records.

The county board debated razing the structure in 2017. Developers have proposed renovating the building into affordable housing.

The sanatorium was added to the National Register of Historic Places on September 21, 2021.
