= Edmund J. James =

American economist and academic (1855–1925)

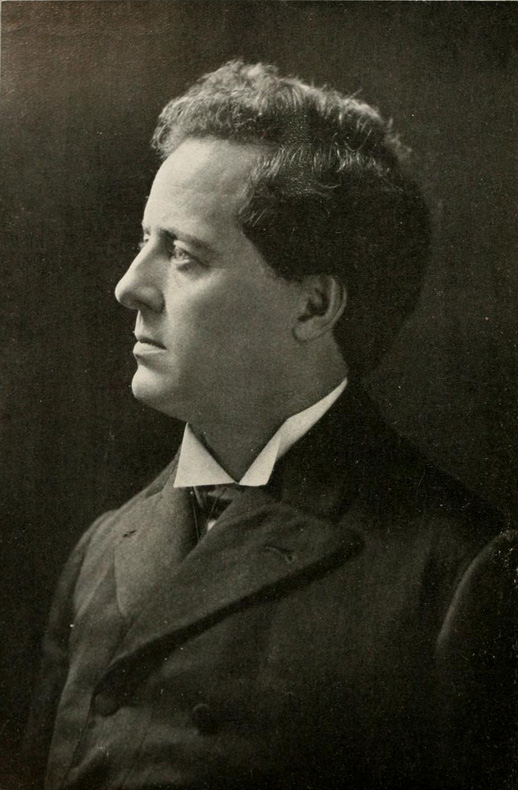
- James in 1912

5th President of the University of Illinois system
- In office 1904–1920
- Preceded by: Andrew S. Draper
- Succeeded by: David Kinley

7th President of Northwestern University
- In office 1902–1904
- Preceded by: Henry Wade Rogers; Daniel Bonbright (interim)
- Succeeded by: Abram W. Harris; Thomas F. Holgate (interim)

President of the American Economic Association
- In office 1910
- Preceded by: Davis Rich Dewey
- Succeeded by: Henry Walcott Farnam

Personal details
- Born: May 21, 1855 Jacksonville, Illinois, U.S.
- Died: June 17, 1925 (aged 70) Covina, California, U.S.
- Spouse: Anna Margarethe Lange (m. 1879; died 1914)
- Education: Northwestern University; Harvard University; University of Halle
- Profession: College administrator

Edmund Janes James (May 21, 1855 – June 17, 1925) was an American academic, president of the University of Illinois from 1904 to 1920, and the primary founder, first president and first editor for the American Academy of Political and Social Science. He also served as the 7th president of Northwestern University from 1902 to 1904.

== Early years ==
Born in Jacksonville, Illinois, James was the son of Methodist minister, Colin Dew James, and Amanda Keziah (Casad) James. For his secondary school education, he went to a high school from Illinois State Normal University (now known as Illinois State University) and graduated in 1873. He attended Northwestern in 1874 and Harvard in 1876 but said to not have enjoyed what Harvard had to offer. He transferred to the University of Halle, where he studied economics under the direction of Johannes Conrad. He earned a doctorate in political economy in 1877 with a thesis on the American tariff. Upon his return to the United States he received an appointment as a high school principal.

== University of Pennsylvania ==
James was a public finance and administration professor at the Wharton School of Finance and Economy and taught political and social science in the Department of Philosophy. In addition to teaching, he would later become director of the Wharton School. When James arrived in 1883, he wanted to change the way the students were being taught if they were pursuing business careers. In a statement to the American Bankers' Association in 1890, he stated,

It was these considerations then that determined Mr. Wharton to establish this school. First: the belief that the business classes of our country need a higher training as much or more than any other classes; second the view that the commercial or business college, however, real and valuable its higher training, does not in its present form furnish a kind of higher training of the community, as is shown by the fact of the small number of youths looking to business careers who enter college.

While in Philadelphia, James organized the American Academy of Political and Social Science to foster research to help solve important social problems. In 1884, he was elected as a member to the American Philosophical Society.

Trustees of the university and many of the staff were conservative and unenthusiastic about the idea of focusing on economics and political science, with courses in accounting, banking, and business law. In 1896, James was dismissed from the university. An observation made by Edward Potts Cheyney in 1940 on both James's and Robert Ellis Thompson's departure, he stated, "The departure of both [James and Thompson] was a serious and unnecessary loss to the University; it has not had too many men of their stature, and neither need have gone if greater reasonableness had been exerted."

== Northwestern University ==
James arrived after the presidencies of Henry Wade Rogers (1890–1900) and Daniel Bonbright (1900–1902). University trustees were excited to find a man with such an impressive resume and with a philosophy about higher education that was compatible with their own. James and the trustees agreed to make the university the top Methodist institution of higher education in the country.

Financial limitations impeded implementation of new programs, however, and trustees were uncomfortable with increasing indebtness. A letter to James from M. H. Wilson, chairman of the board of trustees, stated, "[NU] is ambitious to develop and broaden that curriculum as rapidly as a wise administration of its resources will permit; [W]e cannot believe that on this proposition, your judgement will differ from our own."

Soon after his arrival at Northwestern James identified and committed to correcting wide-ranging problems. Poorly funded library services, science laboratories and professional schools, for example, limited education access for both faculty and students. Enrollment and its revenue stream were hampered by the absence of graduate and technical schools, residence and dining halls, a chapel, gymnasium, and student union.

He persuaded the trustees to create a Jubilee Memorial Fund for celebrations during the 1905 semi-centennial but his other fund-raising ideas were less successful. He tried to market the school's name with football, baseball, and debate teams, and with such academic programs as alumni groups, scholarships, and fellowships. He planned to enlist Andrew Carnegie as an advocate of the school but Carnegie objected to the school's Methodist affiliation.

James's term as president was short lived because trustees came to distrust his judgment. He was viewed as reaching too far, too broadly and too quickly for the school's financial resources. William A. Dyche, Northwestern business manager, summarized: "I sometimes feel that James's wide horizon and his eagerness to plan for the years ahead were, from a practical standpoint, a source of weakness. Possibly if he had not had so many things in mind, each of which was beyond criticism, he might have been satisfied with his labors."

== University of Illinois Urbana-Champaign ==
James agreed to become the University of Illinois' fourth president in August 1904. Ten years before he accepted, he had been notified of the job offer. His initial objective was to establish contacts with various influential people across the nation and spend some time visiting campuses.

Before leaving his position, president Draper advised James to "[raise] scholarly standards and [improve] instruction," and warned that the university had received as much financial help from the state of Illinois as could be had. James ignored Draper's assessment of state appropriations, knowing that Illinois had increased spending in many categories and seeing an opportunity for the university to obtain monies that would fund future needs. James requested and received a half million dollars from the state legislature. Two years later he obtained another half million dollars. In 1909 came three million dollars and in 1911 two hundred thousand dollars. In addition, via the mill tax law, James increased savings by seven times that of the prior thirty-six years.

At James' tenth anniversary the University Senate honored his achievements during the 1914 commencement. A summary was presented by David Kinley (who would eventually succeed James):

"He has had large and far-reaching plans. He has seen the vision and has dreamed the dream. He has planned largely and asked largely, and therefore we have been treated with corresponding liberality. In physical development; in the enlargement of our faculty; in raising our standards and ideals of scholarship and investigation; in giving the world a proper estimation of the importance and progress of the University of Illinois – in all the elements of progress during the decade. Edmund James he has inspired, led, and achieved. With infinite patience and kind tact and wisdom he has met and solved difficulties and opposition, and has overcome obstacles. He has accepted and profited by kindly criticism. Over and over again he has skillfully turned hostile criticism to the accomplishment of the very purposes against which it was directed. Without ceasing he has impressed upon faculty and students the need for constantly rising standards of scholarship, and the importance of productive scholarship. All that makes a man a great and successful university president, Edmund James has met the test, step by step, through the years he has been with us, raising the University to an ever higher level of work and reputation.

— David Kinley, Illinois Alumni News, 1925

In July 1919 James was granted a year's leave of absence in hopes of improving his health. A year later he was still unwell and submitted his resignation in the spring of 1920. A letter to the board in which he said how much the position had meant to him and was better suited for a younger man. Two years prior to his granted resignation, he had wished to resign from the position to enlist in the war and had said many times, "too young for the civil war and too old for this one." Even though the university had become a military academy and was helping the war, he was still not satisfied with this accomplishment.

== Legacy in U.S.-China relations ==
President James had the vision to build strong ties with China through education as early as 1906. That year, James wrote to President Theodore Roosevelt proposing a plan to establish scholarships for Chinese students to come to the U.S., this was later known as the "Boxer Indemnity Scholarship Program" (庚子賠款獎學金). James in his letter noted: "China is upon the verge of a revolution […] The nation which succeeds in educating the young Chinese of the present generation will be the nation which for a given expenditure of effort will reap the largest possible returns in moral, intellectual and commercial influence."

President James established ties with China through the Chinese Minister to the United States, Wu Ting-Fang, and created a direct connection between China and the Urbana campus. James also set up the first office for foreign students in the United States. Between 1911 and 1920, the University of Illinois was educating a third of all the Chinese students in the United States; many that held degrees from Illinois later influenced China's development, including Coching Chu (class of 1913) who is known as "Father of Chinese Meteorology". Edward Y. Ying (class of 1939) was influential in the planning of modern Shanghai. H.Y. Moh (class of 1913) later became a cotton manufacturer and government minister.

== Personal life ==
James married Anna Margarethe Lange on August 22, 1879, whom he met during his time at the University of Halle.

They had three children named Anthony John (b.1885), Herman Gerlach, (b.1887), and Helen Dickson, (b.1889). James never had the best health with the contribution of working late and not having much exercise except for his hobby of horseback riding. It was said that he would ride around campus in his horse peeking at a window or looking at many lands in the area.

He lived in the old white house in front of the campus until the first world war came and made it be used for the Y.M.C.A for the school of military aeronautics. He then resided to a house on Nevada St., later to be used by successor David Kinley.

James was known to have many acquaintances around the world, including professors from different universities. He was an educated man who conversed on a variety of subjects, such as mathematics and natural sciences. He was said to be a kind person; one faculty member attributed his kindness to a wish to be appreciated.

Motivation was a big factor in James's persona, shown when he encouraged students and faculty to reach for more. In a convocation on December 3, 1914, he said:

I should like to have it said that at Illinois the members of the faculty from student assistants in the laboratories to the heads of departments show the keenest interest in the work and welfare of the students, helping them when they need help, inspiring them, holding them moreover always strictly to their work, as the most moral lesson which can be taught to a student.

== Death ==
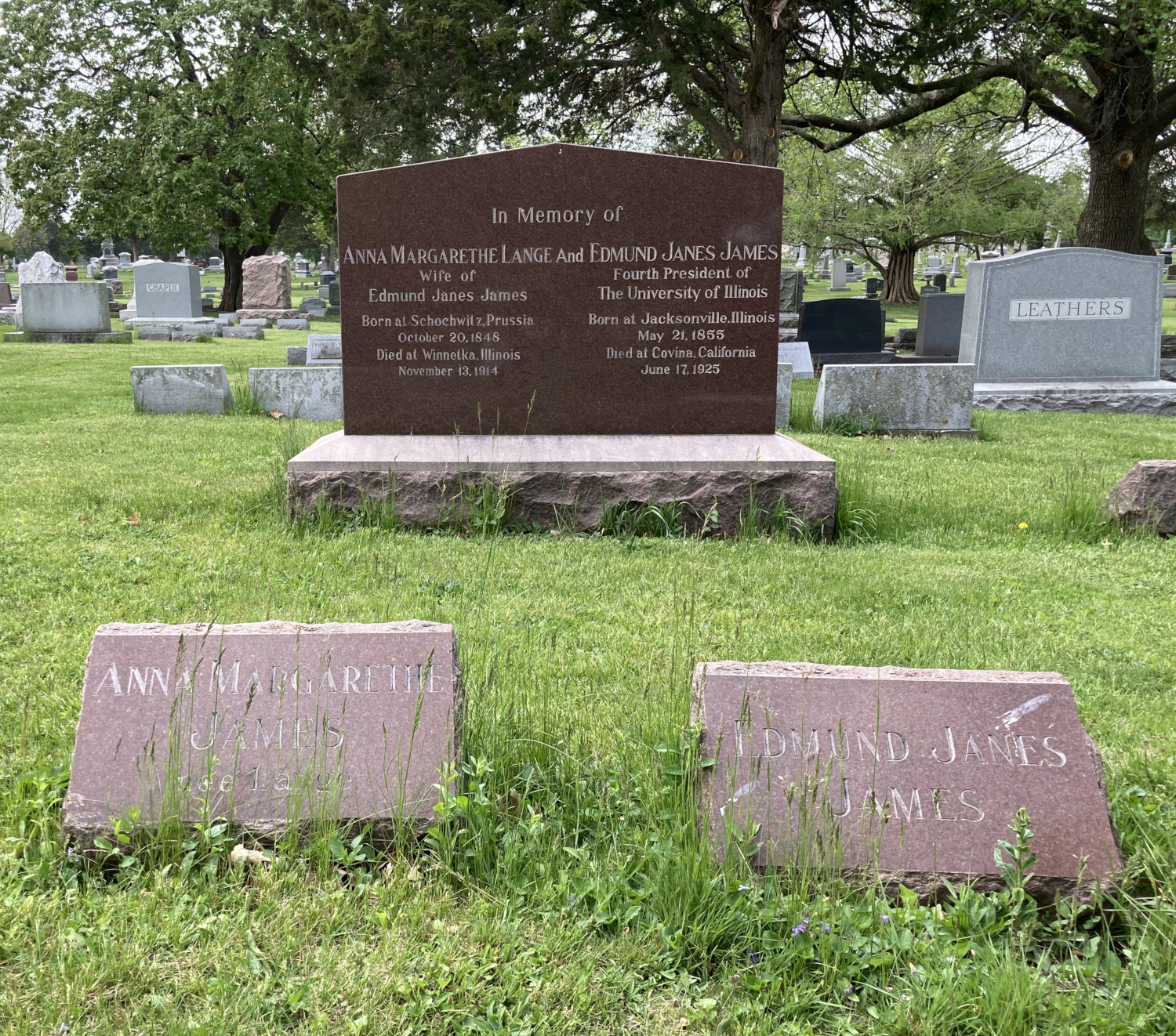
James's grave at Mount Hope Cemetery

On June 17, after living for five years on a farm near Covina, California, James died at the age of seventy. His death was caused by uraemia and hardening of the arteries. He was buried at Mount Hope Cemetery in Urbana.

In the funeral service, the university senate marched in their academic uniform with the active and honorary pallbearers beside them. In the sermon by Reverend James C. Baker, he would talk about the personal characteristics James had. David Kinley gave a speech summarizing the achievements of his old friend and leader. In addition to the speech, Kinley also recited a poem:

The foothills of the mountain range
Sweep downwards to the given;
And who'd plant truth on the mountain top
Must climb the hills between;
O'er range on range, up peak on peak,
His toilsome path pursue,
And on each peak his beacon light,
While he plans his work anew.
The light from the beacon on each hill
In widening circles sweeps,
And evil, ignorance and fear
Are swept from plain and steeps.
Then up to the light walk the children of men,
O'er the way that their leader has trod,
Where o'er torrent and crag and peak he has blazed
A path to the city of God
Such, Edmund James, is the way you have walked
Through the years of your dwelling time here,
As up the hills of knowledge you've led
With courage, wisdom and cheer,
I give you greeting, Edmund James,
In the name of the women and men
Who've walked through dark and light with you,
And know you a leader of men.
