= Abram W. Harris =

American academic administrator (1858–1935)

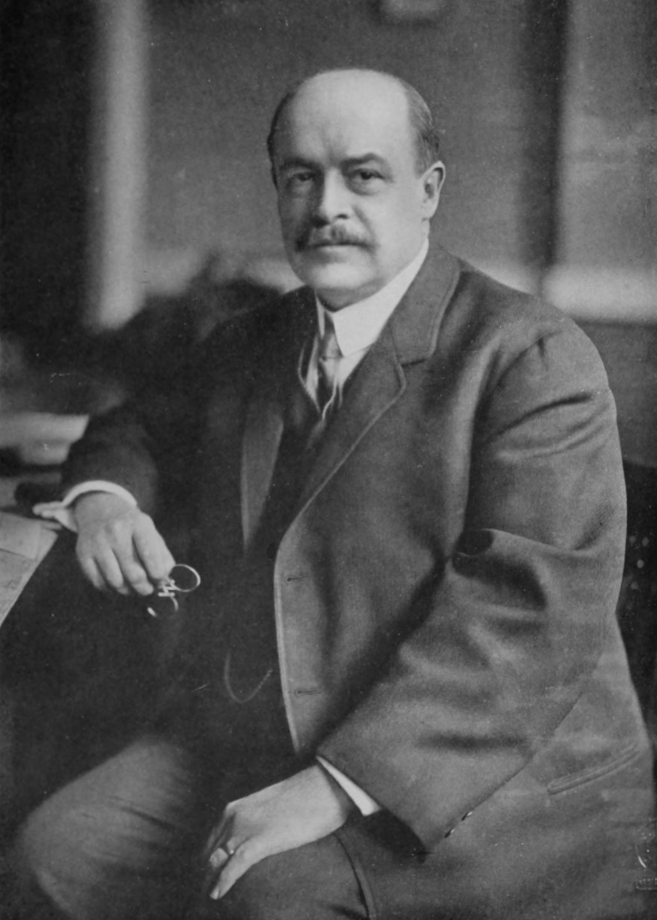

8th President of Northwestern University
- In office 1906–1916
- Preceded by: Thomas Holgate (interim)
- Succeeded by: Thomas Holgate (interim)

Personal details
- Born: November 7, 1858 Philadelphia, Pennsylvania, U.S.
- Died: February 21, 1935 (aged 76) Philadelphia, Pennsylvania, U.S.
- Resting place: West Laurel Hill Cemetery, Bala Cynwyd, Pennsylvania, U.S.
- Education: Wesleyan University (BA); Wesleyan University (MA); Bowdoin College (DSc)
- Occupation: Academic administrator

Abram Winegardner Harris (November 7, 1858 – February 21, 1935) was an American academic, university president, and honor society founder. He was the 8th president of Northwestern University, serving from 1906 to 1916. He was also the first president of the University of Maine from 1896 to 1906. Harris was one of the founders and first president of the Honor Society Phi Kappa Phi and a founder of Alpha Delta Tau.

== Early life and education ==
Harris was born in Philadelphia on November 7, 1858. His parents were Susan Anna (nee Réed) and James Russell Harris.

He received his education in the Friends schools of Philadelphia. He graduated from Wesleyan University, receiving a B.A. in 1880 and an M.A. in 1883. He also attended universities in Munich and Berlin. Later, he received a Doctor of Science from Bowdoin College.

Harris received an honorary doctor of law degrees from the University of New Brunswick in 1900, the University of Maine in 1901, and Wesleyan University in 1904.

== Career ==
Harris taught mathematics at the Dickinson Seminary and at Wesleyan University. Harris became the chief of the Office of Experimental Stations of the U.S. Department of Agriculture in Washington, D.C.

Harris became the first president of Maine State College in 1893. While there, he oversaw the transformation of the college into the University of Maine in 1897. As part of that process, he added a B.A. degree and expanded the college's curriculum to include classics, electrical engineering, library economy, and pharmacy.

He left the University of Maine in 1901 and became the headmaster and director of the Jacob Tome Institute (now the Tome School) in Port Deposit, Maryland, from 1901 to 1906.

He became the 8th president of Northwestern University in 1906 where he helped develop the School of Commerce (now the Kellogg School of Management). He retired from Northwestern in 1916.

Harris was one of the founders and first president of the Honor Society Phi Kappa Phi and a founder of Alpha Delta Tau.

In his retirement, Harris conducted independent research in agriculture, education, and religion. He was chairman of the executive board of the Religious Education Association from 1915 to 1917.

== Personal life ==
Harris married Clara V. Bainbridge of Philadelphia on February 22, 1888. They had a son, Abram W. Harris Jr. The family had a summer house in Manset, Maine.

Harris was chairman of the Chicago Vice Commission, president of the American Social Hygiene Association, and a trustee of Drew University. From 1916 to 1924, he was the corresponding secretary of the Board of Education of the Methodist Episcopal Church in New York City. He became its secretary in 1924, serving until he died.

Harris died in Philadelphia on February 21, 1935, at the home of his son. He was interred at West Laurel Hill Cemetery in Bala Cynwyd, Pennsylvania.
