= Frank Morton McMurry =

American academic (1862–1936)

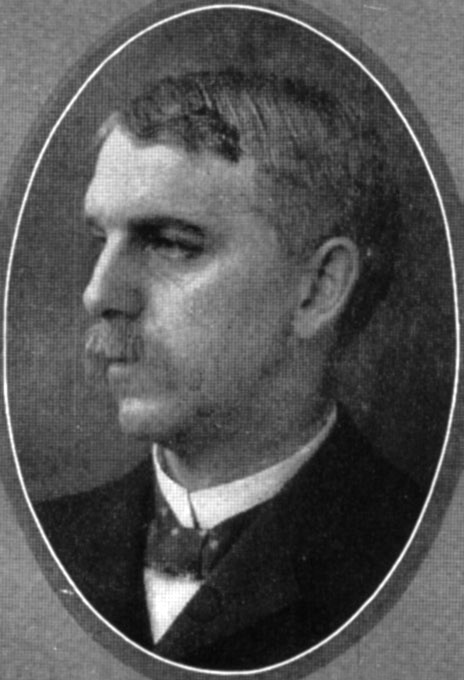
- Born: 1862 near Crawfordsville, Indiana
- Died: 1936 (aged 73–74)
- Relatives: Charles Alexander McMurry (brother)

Academic background
- Education: University of Michigan; Halle and Jena (Germany)

Academic work
- Discipline: Education
- Institutions: Illinois State University; Columbia University

Frank Morton McMurry (1862–1936) was an American educator, educational theorist, pioneer in American Herbartianism, and brother to Charles Alexander McMurry.

== Early life ==
In 1862, McMurry was born in Crawfordsville, Indiana. Following the death of his father, his mother moved the family to rural Illinois, settling in Normal, Illinois.

== Career ==
McMurry's education and career began with attending normal schools, eventually graduating from Illinois State Normal University's model school program in Normal, Illinois in 1879. Following his graduation, he attended the University of Michigan from 1881 to 1882.

In 1886, McMurry enrolled in universities in Halle and Jena, Germany, studying educational theory and psychology. McMurry studied the works of Karl Stoy and Wilhelm Rein, who were two of the leading German Herbartian educators at the time. This influenced him further to adopt and study the pedagogy of Herbartianism. In 1889, he received his Ph.D. and returned to the United States.

In 1891, McMurry returned to Illinois State Normal University and became a professor of pedagogy as well as a training teacher for the university's model school, where he began to incorporate Herbartianism into his educational models and lessons. McMurry participated in the National Herbart Society, as well as the National Education Association, where he and other Herbartianists submitted their educational findings. In 1895, McMurry returned to Germany to further study education and pedagogy.

He returned to the United States and was hired at Columbia University where he was appointed professor in 1898. While at the Illinois State Normal University, he introduced the "practice-teaching" method, which is now commonly known as "student teaching" and is found in most teacher training programs across the country. With Ralph Stockman Tarr he published the Tarr and McMurry Common School Geographies (1900), and with his brother Charles, Method of the Recitation (1903).

McMurry also was the author of How to Study and Teaching How to Study (1900) and Elementary School Standards (1913).
