= Tuiskon Ziller =

German philosopher and educationist (1817–1882)

Tuiskon Ziller (22 December 1817, Wasungen -20 April 1882, Leipzig) was a German educator, philosopher and pedagogue, a representative of the Herbartian pedagogy. He is best known for his contributions to the field of education, particularly in the areas of pedagogy and psychology.

== Biography ==
Tuiskon Ziller was born on October 19, 1817, in Wasungen, near Meiningen, Saxe-Meiningen. Ziller was influenced by the educational ideas of Johann Friedrich Herbart and played a significant role in the development and dissemination of Herbartian pedagogy.

Ziller emphasized the importance of moral and intellectual education, arguing that education should focus on the development of both character and intellect. He advocated for a systematic and organized approach to teaching, based on clear educational objectives and the careful selection and presentation of material. Ziller also emphasized the importance of individualized instruction, tailoring teaching methods to the needs and abilities of each student.

In addition to his work in education, Ziller made significant contributions to the field of psychology, particularly in the areas of educational psychology and child development. He conducted research on topics such as attention, memory, and learning, and his work helped to shape the emerging field of educational psychology in the late 19th century.

Overall, Tuiskon Ziller is remembered as an influential figure in the history of education, pedagogy and psychology, whose ideas continue to have an impact on educational theory and practice today.

Tuiskon Ziller died on April 20, 1882, in Leipzig at the age of 64.

== Publications ==
- Einleitung in die allgemeine Pädagogik (Leipzig 1856)
- Die Regierung der Kinder (Leipzig 1857)
- Grundlegung zur Lehre vom ergehenden Unterricht (Leipzig 1865, 1884)
- Herbartische Reliquien (Leipzig 1871)
- Vorlesungen über Allgemeine Pädagogik (Leipzig 1876, 1884)
- Allgemeine philosophische Ethik (Leipzig 1880)
- Allgemeine Pädagogik, 1892
