= Herbartianism =

Educational philosophy, movement, and method

Herbartianism is an educational philosophy, movement, and method loosely based on the educational and pedagogical thought of German educator Johann Friedrich Herbart, and influential on American school pedagogy of the late 19th century as the field worked towards a science of education. Herbart advocated for instruction that introduced new ideas in discrete steps. About a quarter-century after his death, Herbart's ideas were expanded in two German schools of thought that were later embodied in the method used at a practice school in Jena, which attracted educationists from the United States. Herbartianism was later replaced by new pedagogies, such as those of John Dewey.

== Description ==
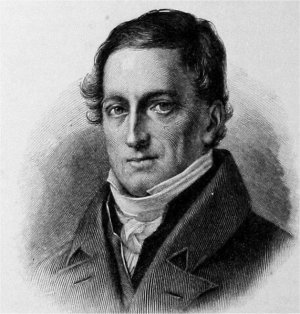
Herbart

Herbartianism was used most often in adolescent instruction and was greatly influential on American school pedagogy in the 19th century. Herbart believed in maintaining the integrity of a student's individuality for as long as possible during the education process as well as an emphasis on moral training. The goal of Herbartianism was to aid students in their learning process, beginning from no knowledge to complete knowledge.

Herbart's pedagogical method was divided into discrete steps: preparation, presentation, association, generalization, and application. In preparation, teachers introduce new material in relation to the students' existing knowledge or interests, so as to instill an interest in the new material. In presentation, the new material is shown in a concrete or material fashion. In association, the new material is compared with the students' previous knowledge for similarities and differences, so as to note the new material's distinction. In generalization, the new material is extrapolated beyond concrete and material traits. In application, if the students have internalized the new material, they apply it towards every facet of their lives rather than in a utilitarian manner. Through this process, students will be able to achieve complete knowledge on the curriculum being taught. Herbartianism provided terminology for didactic theory and helped improve teachers professionalism.

== Rise and influence ==
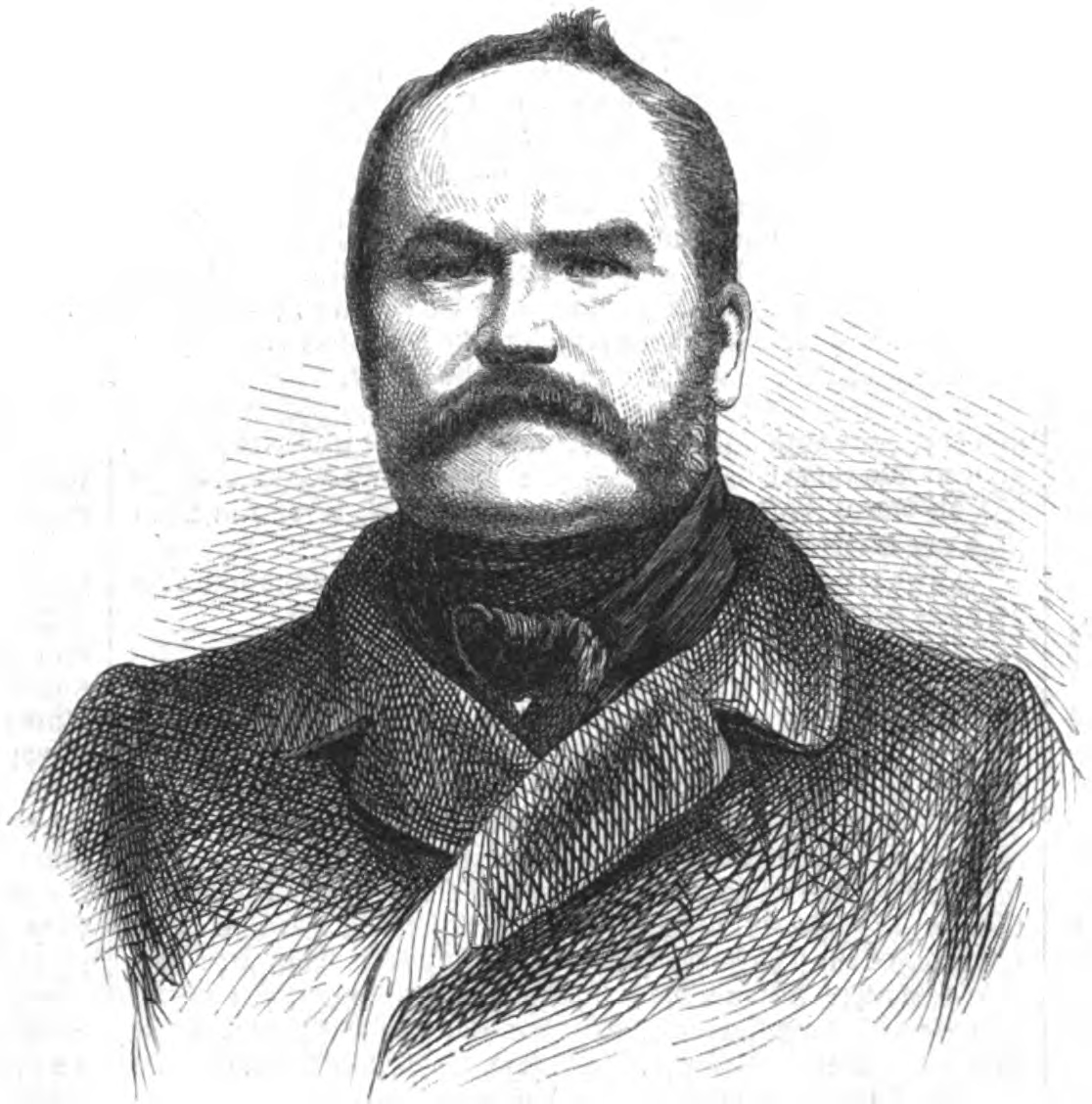
Rein later ran the Jena school, whose ideas were imported into American school pedagogy

While the term Herbartianism derives transparently from Herbart's name, the movement was only loosely connected to his own ideas and was not an organized practice until 25 years after his death in 1841. Herbartianism was developed from Herbart's philosophy, and divided into two schools of thought. In the first, Tuiskon Ziller of Leipzig expanded on Herbart's philosophy of "unification of studies", especially around a single discipline (called "correlation" and "concentration", respectively). In the second, Karl Stoy of Jena opened a practice school in the style of Herbart's Königsberg school. A student of Ziller and Stoy, Wilhelm Rein, later led the Jena school and designed a German elementary school curriculum that the school used. This school became "the center of Herbartian theory and practice and attracted students of pedagogy from outside Germany, including the United States".

Between the 1890s and the early twentieth century, Herbartianism was influential in normal schools and universities as they worked towards a science of education. In particular, Illinois State University, then known as Illinois State Normal University, was one of the central hubs for the Herbartianism movement in the United States. In 1893, prominent adherents at Illinois State Normal University founded the Normal Pedagogical Club, which consisted of students and faculty. Later in 1895, they helped found the National Herbart Society "to study and investigate and discuss important problems of education". Among those prominent in the society were Charles De Garmo (their first president), Charles Alexander McMurry, and Frank Morton McMurry, who all wrote on methods in education. All of whom, had studied Herbartianism or were introduced to the varieties of German Herbartianism. Charles De Garmo had studied under and worked with Karl Stoy and Otto Frick in Jena. While Charles and Frank McMurry had worked with Ziller and Rein, whom many considered to be radical in their approach to Herbartianism. These three were considered to be the main transporters of Herbartian pedagogy from Germany to the United States, where they blended the views and teachings of Otto Frick, Karl Stoy, Wilhelm Rein and Tuiskon Ziller, to create an American branch of the educational pedagogy. The society also acknowledged works influenced by Herbartianism, such as two works by John Dewey, within a yearbook. The society removed Herbart from its name in 1902 and later became the National Society for the Study of Education.

== Decline ==
Newer pedagogical theories, such as those of John Dewey, eventually replaced Herbartianism. Though Herbartian work is unpopular in the 21st century, its greatest influence was in the 19th century's "development of the science of education". In the 1996 Philosophy of Education: An Encyclopedia, J. J. Chambliss wrote that Herbartianism's influence shows wherever "thinking, moral judgment, and conduct" are considered simultaneously.

== See also ==
- Franz S. Exner
