= List of presidents of Illinois State University =

This is a list of individuals who have been president of Illinois State University as president since 1857:

== Table of presidents ==
No.	Image	President	Term start	Term end	Refs.
Presidents of Illinois State Normal University (1857–1964)
1		Charles E. Hovey	1857	1862	
2		Richard Edwards	1862	1876	
3		Edwin C. Hewett	1876	1890	
4		John Williston Cook	1890	1899	
5		Arnold Tompkins	1899	1900	
6		David Felmley	1900	1930	
7		Harry A. Brown	1930	1933	
acting		Herman H. Schroeder	1933	October 11, 1933	
8		Raymond W. Fairchild	October 11, 1933	August 15, 1955 (Note: Although Fairchild "officially" resigned on August 15, 1955, for all practical purposes, Fairchild effectively handed-over all of his duties to acting president Larsen on June 14, 1954, while trying, unsuccessfully, recover from an unspecified illness that first cost him a leg and then eventually his life.)	
acting		Arthur H. Larsen	June 14, 1954	August 31, 1956	
President of Illinois State University at Normal (1964–1967)
9		Robert Gehlmann Bone	September 1, 1956	August 31, 1967	
Presidents of Illinois State University (1967–present)
10		Samuel Braden	September 1, 1967	August 31, 1970	
acting		Francis R. Geigle	September 1, 1970	August 31, 1971	
11		David K. Berlo	September 1, 1971	June 30, 1973 (Note: Forced to resign.)	
interim		Gene A. Budig	July 1, 1973	November 15, 1973	
12		Gene A. Budig	November 15, 1973	June 23, 1977 (Note: Resigned to lead West Virginia University.)	
acting		James M. Horner (Note: Horner sometimes goes by the name "Jack". Vice President and Provost. Later, became 11th President of University of Central Missouri.)	June 24, 1977	July 14, 1977	
13		Lloyd Watkins	July 15, 1977	August 31, 1988	
14		Thomas P. Wallace	September 1, 1988	August 14, 1995 (Note: Forced to resign.)	
interim		David A. Strand	August 15, 1995	April 16, 1996	
15		David A. Strand	April 16, 1996	June 30, 1999	
16		Victor Boschini Jr.	July 1, 1999	May 31, 2003 (Note: Resigned to lead Texas Christian University.)	
interim		C. Alvin Bowman	June 1, 2003	February 29, 2004	
17		C. Alvin Bowman	March 1, 2004	May 15, 2013	
interim		Sheri Noren Everts	May 16, 2013	August 14, 2013	
18		Timothy Flanagan	August 15, 2013	March 22, 2014	
19		Larry Dietz	March 22, 2014	June 30, 2021	
20		Terri Goss Kinzy	July 1, 2021	February 14, 2023	
interim		Aondover Tarhule	February 17, 2023	March 18, 2024	
21		Aondover Tarhule	March 18, 2024	Present	

Table notes:
