= Council for International Exchange of Scholars =

Bureau of Educational and Cultural Affair

For over 60 years, the Council for International Exchange of Scholars (CIES) has helped administer the Fulbright Scholar Program, the U.S. government's flagship academic exchange effort, on behalf of the United States Department of State, Bureau of Educational and Cultural Affairs. Founded in 1947, CIES is a private organization with a staff of around 60 people supplemented by 300 voluntary peer reviewers, primarily academics. CIES is a division of the Institute of International Education (IIE).

Over 800 Fulbright Scholar awards are granted annually to U.S. scholars and professionals to lecture, research or do both for a semester or an academic year. Awards are granted in all academic disciplines and a variety of interdisciplinary fields. A similar number of non-U.S. scholars come for research or lecturing in the United States as Fulbright Visiting Scholars.

CIES also administers other Fulbright programs. The Fulbright International Education Administrators Seminars allow U.S. higher education administrators to study the society, culture and higher education systems in Germany, Japan or Korea during intensive two- or three-week seminars. The Fulbright New Century Scholars Program gathers 30 outstanding research scholars and professionals from around the globe for collaboration on an annual topic of international significance.

Other programs bring non-U.S. scholars to U.S. campuses for research or lecturing. The Occasional Lecturer Program provides travel grants for Fulbright Visiting Scholars to give guest lectures on campuses in other parts of the country from their primary host institution. The Fulbright Scholar-in-Residence program brings scholars from abroad to teach for a semester or a year on U.S. campuses that do not often have the opportunity to host visiting scholars. The Fulbright Visiting Specialists Program: Direct Access to the Muslim World brings scholars, from predominantly Muslim communities in the Middle East, North Africa and South Asia, as well as several countries in Central Asia, Southeast Asia, Europe and Africa, to U.S. institutions for three to six weeks to offer short courses, team-teach, or consult on curriculum development, as well as speak to community groups. The Fulbright Interfaith Community Action Program provides a multinational group of 10 to 12 religious leaders, scholars of religion, non-governmental organization and/or community leaders from diverse religious backgrounds, who are engaged actively in interfaith dialogue in their home countries, with a semester-long exchange experience at a U.S. host institution.

Members of the CIES Advisory Board Members include:

updated December 2023

- Robert Berdahl, chancellor emeritus, University of California, Berkeley
- Victor Boschini, chancellor, Texas Christian University
- Rafael L. Bras, professor, Georgia Institute of Technology
- Hannah Buxbaum, professor/vice president, Indiana University
- Joy Connolly, president, American Council of Learned Societies
- Joan Gabel, chancellor, University of Pittsburgh
- Allan E. Goodman, ceo, Institute of International Education
- Robin Helms, vice president, Association of Community College Trustees
- Anna Harvey, president, Social Science Research Council
- Cynthia Jackson-Hammond, president, Council for Higher Education Accreditation
- Reitumetse Obakeng Mabokela, vice provost, University of Illinois
- Gary May, chancellor, University of California, Davis
- Ted Mitchell, president, American Council on Education
- Harris Pastides, Chair; president/professor emeritus, University of South Carolina
- Fernando Reimers, professor/director, Harvard Graduate School of Education
- Vaughan Turekian, executive director, National Academies

Past members include:

noted since December 2023

- Eduardo Gamarra
- Linn Hobbs
- Ronald Kassimir
- Bette Loiselle
- Anand A. Yang
