= Mildred Pratt =

Mildred Inez Pratt
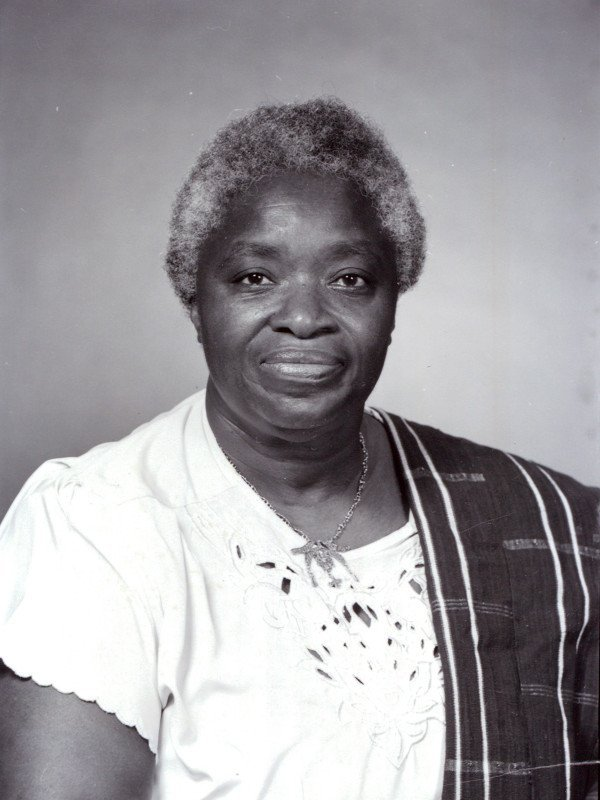
- Born: Mildred Inez Sirls; October 15, 1928; Henderson, Texas
- Died: August 6, 2012 (aged 83); Bloomington, Illinois
- Education: Jarvis (BA) Butler University (MA) Indiana University (MA) University of Pittsburgh (Ph. D)

Mildred Inez Pratt (née Sirls; October 15, 1928 – August 6, 2012) was a professor in social work who taught at the University of Pittsburgh, Illinois State University, and Rio de Janeiro. She was also an advocate against racial inequality who helped found the McLean County Black History Project.

== Biography ==
Pratt was born as one of eight children to sharecroppers in Henderson, Texas. Despite growing up poor, she still fought for a thorough education and was valedictorian of her high school.

In 1951, Pratt received a bachelor's degree in religion and sociology from Jarvis Christian University. At Butler University, she earned a master's degree in psychology and philosophy of religion and later pursued another master's in social work at Indiana University. In 1969, Pratt finally earned a Ph.D. from the University of Pittsburgh.

Pratt was married to her husband Ted Pratt for almost 32 years and, after his death in 1996, started the Pratt Music Foundation in his honor.

Pratt's daughter, Menah Pratt-Clarke, proceeded to write the book A Black Woman’s Journey from Cotton Picking to College Professor: Lessons about Race, Class, and Gender in America about Pratt's life and career following her passing in August 2012.

== Illinois State University ==
Pratt was hired by Illinois State University’s Department of Sociology and Anthropology to become the first full-time faculty member in the department to teach social work. Her tenure was initially denied which led her to write to the then President of Illinois State University, David Berlo, to make him aware of the institutional racism she was experiencing in her tenure case. Eventually, she earned tenure and remained teaching at Illinois State University for the rest of her professional career until she retired in 1993 and was named a professor emeritus.

Pratt faced racism during the pursual of her second master's degree when she was denied scholarship for being Black. This led her towards establishing the Mildred Pratt Student Assistance Fund in her later career at Illinois State University. The fund specifically helps students who are of unexpected financial need and are seeking a bachelor's or master's degree in social work.

== Advocacy ==
Pratt co-founded the McLean County Black History Project in 1982 and served as co-director for several years. The purpose of this project was to gather information about African-American residents in the Bloomington-Normal area so their stories can be shared. It collects materials, holds workshops, sponsors archeological digs, features concerts by Black performers, presents scholarships to encourage student research, and offers ongoing aid to persons seeking to study the African-American past.

She published several journal articles about social welfare and the experiences of Black Americans whilst advocating for more education in social work.

Pratt also founded the Pratt Music Foundation that works in conjunction with Illinois Wesleyan University and the Share Music Program to provide scholarships for music lessons to support children in grades 2–12 within the Bloomington-Normal area.
