= Tom S. Clark =

American political scientist

Tom Clark
- Title: Professor of Political Science

Academic background
- Education: Rutgers University (BA); Princeton University (MA, PhD)

Academic work
- Discipline: Political Science; Political Economy
- Institutions: Stanford University; University of Chicago; Princeton University; Emory University

Tom S. Clark is a political scientist who specializes in American law and courts. He has made contributions to the study of judicial independence, decision-making at the U.S. Supreme Court, judicial elections, and policing and law enforcement.

He is a professor of political science at Stanford University, where he is also a Senior Fellow, by courtesy, at the Hoover Institution. Prior to coming to Stanford, he was the David and Mary Winton Green Professor at the University of Chicago and before that the Charles Howard Candler Professor at Emory University. He has also held visiting appointments at the Center for Advanced Study in the Behavioral Sciences at Stanford, Princeton University, and the Institute for Advanced Study at the Toulouse School of Economics.

Clark is an expert on the US Supreme Court and the American legal system and publishes research about the Court's decisions, the lower federal courts, state courts in the United States, and policing and public safety. He has received grants to support his research from the National Science Foundation as well as private organizations. His work has won awards from the multiple major political science associations and has been discussed in major media coverage of American law and politics.

== Early life and education ==
Clark was born and raised in New Jersey. He attended college at Rutgers University, earning a degree in political science. He then attended Princeton University and earned his Ph.D. in Politics, where he was selected as a Porter Ogden Jacobus Fellow.

== Career and Research ==
Clark joined the faculty at Stanford University in 2025. He had previously spent one year on the faculty at the University of Chicago and 16 years at Emory University, where he arrived after completing his graduate studies in 2008. He is also currently the editor of the Journal of Law and Courts and previously served as a field editor for the Journal of Politics. His research expertise is in two related areas: judicial politics and public safety and policing.

=== Judicial Politics ===
Clark's primary area of research and expertise is the politics of judicial decision-making in the United States. His first book, The Limits of Judicial Independence, was published by Cambridge University Press in the Series in the Political Economy of Institutions and Decisions and won the 2011 Riker Prize for the best book from the Political Economy section of the American Political Science Association. That book examines how the US Supreme Court identifies and responds to changes in public support for the Court. Clark argues that declining public support for the Court leads to political attacks on and criticism of the Court. In response, the Court moderates its behavior, in an attempt to stay within the broad contours of public opinion.

His second book, The Supreme Court was also published by Cambridge University Press in the Political Economy of Institutions and Decisions. That book builds on a series of articles Clark published with Benjamin Lauderdale that proposed models for measuring ideology from voting behavior. Clark and Lauderdale develop statistical models of judicial ideology that incorporate the content of the law that judges decide on. In the book, Clark examines how the broader political climate frames legal issues and shapes the coalitions that emerge among the justices.

Along with Barry Friedman, Margaret Lemos, Andrew D. Martin, Anna Harvey, and Allison Larsen, he co-authored a textbook on the subject of judicial decision-making, published by West Academic.

=== Policing and Public Safety ===
Clark has published a series of studies about policing in American cities. Most of these studies focus on the use of lethal force by police. These studies have been published in both political science journals and general science journals. His most significant publication is a book, Deadly Force, which uses the results of open records requests to document patterns of officer-involved shootings over two decades across the 300 largest cities in the United States.

Much of Clark's work has evaluated racial bias in police shootings, the effects of providing military equipment of police departments, and the effects of informing the public about how often police use force in their cities.

== Books ==
- The Limits of Judicial Independence. Cambridge University University Press, 2011
- The Supreme Court: An Analytic History of Constitutional Decision-Making. Cambridge University University Press, 2019.
- Judicial Decision-Making: A Coursebook. (with Barry Friedman, Margaret Lemos, Andrew D. Martin, Anna Harvey, and Allison Larsen) West Academic, 2020.
- Deadly Force: Police Shootings in Urban America. (with Adam N. Glynn and Michael Leo Owens) Princeton University Press, 2025.

== Awards ==
- Joseph Bernd Award, awarded for the best paper published in the Journal of Politics (2023).
- Best Conference Paper Award (honorable mention), Law & Courts Section, American Political Science Association (2017).
- Neal Tate Award Southern Political Science Association (2014).
- Best Journal Article Award, Law & Courts Section, American Political Science Association (2013).
- William H. Riker Award, awarded for best book on political economy, Political Economy Section, American Political Science Association (2012).
- Best Journal Article Award, Law & Courts Section, American Political Science Association (2011).
- Best Conference Paper Award (honorable mention), Law & Courts Section, American Political Science Association (2011).
- Emerging Scholar Award, Midwest Political Science Association (2009).
- Carl Albert Award, Best Dissertation in Legislative Studies, Legislative Studies Section, American Political Science Association (2009)..
- Best Conference Paper Award, Law & Courts Section, American Political Science Association (2009).
- CQ Press Award, for best paper by a graduate student, Law & Courts Section, American Political Science Association (2008).
- American Judicature Society Award (honorable mention), for best conference paper, Law & Courts Section, American Political Science Association (2008).
