= Alvin Bowman =

American academic administrator (born 1953)

17th President of Illinois State University
- In office 2004–2013
- Preceded by: Victor Boschini
- Succeeded by: Timothy Flanagan

Personal details
- Born: c.1953 (age 72–73) Charleston, West Virginia, U.S.
- Education: Augustana College (BA); Eastern Illinois University (MA); University of Illinois (PhD)

Clarence Alvin Bowman (born 1953) is an American academic and former President of Illinois State University (ISU). He was trained in, and still teaches upper-level classes in, speech pathology.

== Early life and education ==
Bowman was born in Charleston, West Virginia. He is an African-American. His wife, Linda Bowman, is an adviser and faculty member in the graduate division of the Department of Communications Sciences and Disorders. He and Linda have two daughters. He received a bachelor's degree in speech pathology from Augustana College in 1975, a Master's in speech-language pathology from Eastern Illinois University in 1976 and a PhD in speech and hearing science at University of Illinois in 1979.

He is a trekker and was active for many years climbing a mountain a year.

== Career ==
Bowman started his academic career with ISU in 1978 as a faculty member in the Department of Speech Pathology and Audiology (now the Department of Communications Sciences and Disorders). In 1994, he was appointed chair of the department, as well as director of Down Syndrome Speech-Language Clinic. In 2002, Bowman left the chair position to serve as Illinois State's interim provost. He was named President of ISU in March 2004, following a vote by the Board of Trustees. He was the 17th president of ISU. He also served as the director of HBT Financial.

He published many academic papers and his presidential papers were arranged in three series. He announced his retirement in December 2012.

Academic offices
Preceded by Victor Boschini	President of Illinois State University; 2004 – 2013	Succeeded by Timothy Flanagan
