= American Council of Learned Societies =

Federation of scholarly societies

- Formation: 1919; 107 years ago
- Type: Professional association
- Headquarters: 633 Third Avenue, New York City, U.S.
- Location: United States
- Members: 75 scholarly associations
- President: Joy Connolly
- Website: acls.org

The American Council of Learned Societies (ACLS) is a private, nonprofit federation of 75 scholarly organizations in the humanities and related social sciences founded in 1919. It is best known for its fellowship competitions which provide a range of opportunities for scholars in the humanities and related social sciences at all career stages, from graduate students to distinguished professors to independent scholars, working with a number of disciplines and methodologies in the U.S. and abroad.

== History ==
The federation was created in 1919 to represent the United States in the Union Académique Internationale (International Union of Academies). The founders of ACLS, representatives of 13 learned societies, believed that a federation of scholarly organizations (dedicated to excellence in research, and most with open membership) was the best combination of U.S. democracy and intellectual aspirations. According to the council's constitution, its mission was advancing humanistic studies and social sciences and maintaining and strengthening national societies dedicated to those studies.

=== Advancing scholarship in the humanities ===
Since its founding, ACLS has provided the humanities and related social sciences with leadership, opportunities for innovation, and national and international representation. The council's many activities have at their core the practice of scholarly self-governance. Central to ACLS throughout its history have been its programs of fellowships and grants aiding research. ACLS made its first grants, totaling $4,500, in 1926; in 2012, ACLS awarded over $15 million in fellowship stipends and other awards to more than 320 scholars in the United States and abroad. All ACLS awards are made through rigorous peer review by specially appointed committees of scholars from throughout the United States and, in some programs, abroad. During the late 1950s, the council encouraged Hans Wehr in his writing of the first English edition of his Dictionary of Modern Written Arabic (1962).

=== Relationships among learned societies ===
The executive directors of the ACLS member societies meet in a Conference of Administrative Officers (CAO); before 1988, this was the Conference of Secretaries. At its first meeting in 1925 the conference had 11 members, including Frederic Ogg of the American Political Science Association and Ernest Burgess of the American Sociological Society (now the American Sociological Association). The goal of the first meeting, and of every meeting since, was "the promotion of closer relations between the associations of humanists [through] a conference in which the secretaries, or principal executive officers, of its constituent societies could make each other's acquaintance, explain to each other the character, aims and activities of their respective organizations, and discuss, in the light of their various experiences, the many common problems of their societies."

=== New research methods and subjects ===
In addition to peer review, the ACLS has organized committees to research promising fields of study. The concept of organizing expertise around a cultural region grew out of the council's early work in Far Eastern and Slavic studies. After World War II, when the practical need for such competence was evident, the ACLS and the Social Science Research Council developed African, Asian, Latin American, Near and Middle Eastern, Slavic, and East and West European studies.

In 1927 the ACLS Committee on Research in Native American Languages, under the leadership of Franz Boas and Edward Sapir, began in 1927 to "secure an adequate record of Indian languages and dialects." The Committee on a Journal of Medieval Studies, begun in 1924, founded the journal Speculum. The Committee on the History of Ideas, which included Richard McKeon and Arthur Oncken Lovejoy, created the Journal of the History of Ideas. Lovejoy wrote in the journal's first issue, "The processes of the human mind, in the individual or group, which manifest themselves in history, do not run in the enclosed channels corresponding to the officially established divisions of university faculties." At the founding conference of the Committee on Negro Studies in 1940 Ralph Bunche said, "We cannot ignore the importance of making clear to ourselves the scope of our interest in terms of the very broad social implications of our deliberations and resources."

Since the introduction of new research technology, the ACLS has helped scholars explore the impact of new technologies on their fields. In 1964 the council developed a grant and fellowship program to encourage computer use in humanistic research, which continues in its Digital Innovation Fellowships. Our Cultural Commonwealth, the 2006 report by the ACLS Commission on Cyberinfrastructure for the Humanities and Social Sciences, recommended digital humanities using new forms of research, reading and writing.

The ACLS has an interest in the problems of scholarly publication and has conducted a survey of publication needs, established a publication service to advise scholars on communicating research and aided scholars with subsidies and publication. The ACLS-sponsored National Enquiry into the Production and Dissemination of Scholarly Knowledge investigated all aspects of the dissemination of humanistic scholarship from 1974 to 1979. In 1979 it presented a report, Scholarly Communication: The Report of the National Enquiry, published by the Johns Hopkins University Press and operated its Office of Scholarly Communication and Technology in Washington, D.C. until 1984. Today, the ACLS Humanities E-Book collection focuses on how digital innovations can enhance scholarly communication.

=== Humanities scholarship ===
By bringing scholars together as scholars rather than as specialists, the ACLS advocates for the humanities in public forums and policy arenas. The council's role in establishing (in 1964) and reauthorizing (in 1985) the National Endowment for the Humanities is an example.

While continuing to represent the U.S. in the Union Académique Internationale, the ACLS has participated in international scholarly exchange. From 1961 to 1992, its American Studies Program aided overseas scholars specializing in the study of the U.S. The council and other members of the Associated Board of Research Councils founded the Council for International Exchange of Scholars, which administers the graduating-senior Fulbright Program. In 1992 the United States Information Agency asked the ACLS to reinstitute the Fulbright Program in Vietnam, operated by the U.S. Embassy in Hanoi. The ACLS Center for Educational Exchange with Vietnam offers fellowship and study opportunities to Vietnamese scholars. In 1966 the ACLS, the Social Science Research Council and the National Academy of Sciences founded the Committee on Scholarly Communication with China, which maintains an office in Beijing to assist American schools with programs in that country. The ACLS has extended its support of research to scholars in the former USSR through the ACLS Humanities Program in Belarus, Russia and Ukraine, and in Africa through its African Humanities Program.

=== Humanities E-Book (HEB) ===
In June 1999 under its President John D'Arms, ACLS received a $3-million, 5-year grant from The Andrew W. Mellon Foundation to initiate The History E-Book Project. In October 1999, Eileen Gardiner and Ronald G. Musto of Italica Press became the project directors working in collaboration with the Scholarly Publishing Office of the University of Michigan Library and with New York University Press. Three years later and two years ahead of schedule, on September 1, 2002, the History E-Book Project website launched online with over 500 titles. These had been reviewed and recommended by historians and scholarly societies and were often award-winning books in different area specialties. "HEB continued to grow and to adjust accordingly, becoming self-sufficient in 2005, garnering attention and a supportive constituency among scholars, presses, libraries, and learned societies." HEB mission expanded to include all the humanities disciplines and was renamed ACLS Humanities E-Book. In September 2009, the Institute of Historical Research in London called HEB "one of the best—if not the best—electronically accessible sites in the humanities."

At the end of 2019, ACLS transferred the management and administration of Humanities E-Book to the University of Michigan, where this online collection of over 5,400 books of high quality in the humanities and related social sciences is accessible through institutional subscription.

=== Structure and governance ===
The ACLS' organizational structure has experienced few major changes during the council's existence. Most notable is the growth in the number of member societies, from 13 to 71. As the number of societies increased, it became impossible for a council with two representatives of each member to govern effectively. In 1947 a council-elected board of directors was created, and the number of delegates from each society was reduced to one. Another change occurred in 1957; the council moved its headquarters from Washington to New York and appointed Frederick Burkhardt its first president, signaling a new determination to place scholarship at the center of public culture. The ACLS was incorporated in the District of Columbia in 1924, receiving a congressional charter in 1982.

For the fiscal year ending June 30, 2017, the ACLS reported an endowment of US$120 million. During the same period the institution distributed about US$15.9 million in grants and fellowships.

=== Archives ===
The ACLS archives are in the Manuscript Division of the Library of Congress.

=== Graves Awards in the Humanities ===
Graves Awards in the Humanities or Arnold L. Graves and Lois S. Graves Award in the Humanities is a biannual award granted to young scholars in the first decade of their careers to "encourage and reward outstanding accomplishment in actual teaching in the humanities." The award is administered by Pomona College under the auspices of the American Council of Learned Societies.

== Awards ==
- In 2010, the American Council of Learned Societies was awarded the Arts and Sciences Advocacy Award from the Council of Colleges of Arts and Sciences (CCAS). CCAS bestows this award upon an individual or organization demonstrating exemplary advocacy for the arts and sciences, flowing from a deep commitment to the intrinsic worth of liberal arts education.

== Member societies ==
- African Studies Association
- American Academy of Arts and Sciences
- American Academy of Religion
- American Anthropological Association
- American Antiquarian Society
- American Association for the History of Medicine
- American Association for Italian Studies
- American Association of Geographers
- American Dialect Society
- American Economic Association
- American Folklore Society
- American Historical Association
- American Musicological Society
- American Numismatic Society
- American Oriental Society
- American Philosophical Association
- American Philosophical Society
- American Political Science Association
- American Society for Aesthetics
- American Society for Eighteenth-Century Studies
- American Society for Environmental History
- American Society for Legal History
- American Society for Theatre Research
- American Society of Church History
- American Society of Comparative Law
- American Society of International Law
- American Society of Overseas Research
- American Sociological Association
- American Studies Association
- Archaeological Institute of America
- Association for Asian Studies
- Association for Jewish Studies
- Association for Slavic, East European, and Eurasian Studies
- Association for the Advancement of Baltic Studies
- Association for the Study of African American Life and History
- Association of American Law Schools
- Austrian Studies Association
- Bibliographical Society of America
- College Art Association
- Dance Studies Association
- Dictionary Society of North America
- Economic History Association
- German Studies Association
- Hispanic Society of America
- History of Science Society
- International Center of Medieval Art
- Latin American Studies Association
- Law and Society Association
- Linguistic Society of America
- Medieval Academy of America
- Metaphysical Society of America
- Middle East Studies Association
- Modern Language Association of America
- National Communication Association
- National Council of Teachers of English
- National Council on Public History
- National Women's Studies Association
- North American Conference on British Studies
- North American Victorian Studies Association
- Oral History Association
- Organization of American Historians
- Philosophy of Science Association
- Renaissance Society of America
- Rhetoric Society of America
- Shakespeare Association of America
- Sixteenth Century Society and Conference
- Society for American Music
- Society for Cinema and Media Studies
- Society for Classical Studies
- Society for Ethnomusicology
- Society for French Historical Studies
- Society for Military History
- Society for Music Theory
- Society for Social Studies of Science
- Society for the Advancement of Scandinavian Study
- Society for the History of Authorship, Reading and Publishing
- Society for the History of Technology
- Society of Architectural Historians
- Society of Biblical Literature
- World History Association

== Affiliates ==
- American Association of Colleges and Universities
- Association of Research Libraries
- Association of University Presses
- Canadian Federation for the Humanities and Social Sciences
- Center for Research Libraries
- Community College Humanities Association
- Consortium of Humanities Centers and Institutes
- Federation of State Humanities Councils
- International Society for Third-Sector Research
- Phi Beta Kappa
