= Social Science Research Council =

American nonprofit social science research organization

- Formation: 1923
- Type: Social science research nonprofit
- Location: Manhattan, New York, US
- President: Daniel L. Goroff
- Revenue: $14,237,307 (2025)
- Expenses: $15,470,220 (2025)
- Website: www.ssrc.org

The Social Science Research Council (SSRC) is a US-based, independent, international nonprofit organization dedicated to advancing research in the social sciences and related disciplines. Established in Manhattan in 1923, it maintains a headquarters there with a staff of approximately 70.

The SSRC currently administers more than 20 programs in the US and around the world, including work on democracy, expanding opportunity, health, innovation, peacebuilding, and public safety. The SSRC offers several fellowships to researchers in the social sciences and related disciplines, including for international fieldwork. The SSRC also provides research grants, convenes researchers and stakeholders, produces knowledge platforms and reports, and supports mentoring programs that broaden opportunity.

== History ==
=== Early history ===
The SSRC came into being in 1923 as a result of the initiative of the American Political Science Association's committee on research, headed by the association's president, Charles E. Merriam (1874–1953), who was chair of the political science department at the University of Chicago and an early champion of behaviorally-oriented social science.

Representatives of the American Economic Association, the American Sociological Society, and the American Statistical Association joined with Merriam and his associates in forming the world's first coordinating body of the social sciences.

Other national associations—in anthropology, history, and psychology—designated representatives to the new entity, named the Social Science Research Council (SSRC), in the year following its incorporation on December 27, 1924.

To support its work, the SSRC turned not to the US government, whose support seemed more appropriate for the natural sciences, but to private foundations. For the first fifty years, well over three-quarters of the SSRC's funding was provided by the Russell Sage Foundation, the Ford Foundation, the Carnegie Corporation, and two Rockefeller philanthropies, the Laura Spelman Rockefeller Memorial and the Rockefeller Foundation.

The SSRC was part of a wider Progressive Era movement to develop organizations of expertise that could dispense disinterested knowledge to policymakers. These organizations would tap leading thinkers in various fields to think creatively about how to address the social and political ills brought on by the Industrial Revolution.

Other independent, nongovernmental, policy-minded institutions founded in that era included the American Law Institute (1923), the Brookings Institution (1927), and the Council on Foreign Relations (1921). The Council's main distinguishing feature was its commitment to the advancement of research in the social sciences in the United States.

Similar to other Progressive-Era institutions, the SSRC represented a new kind of hybrid—one that was in some ways defined more by what it wasn't than what it was. It was not a governmental body, thus was removed from the pressures of Washington and public calls for quick-fix solutions to social problems. It was not an academic association—so was freed from disciplinary boundaries. It was not a university and hence did not have to confront competing demands for services unrelated to research.

Along with Merriam, two other individuals were especially vital to the SSRC's early success. One was Wesley Clair Mitchell (1874–1948), one of the founders of the New School for Social Research and a leading force behind the emergence of the National Bureau of Economic Research in the 1920s. The other was Beardsley Ruml, who had trained in psychometrics at the University of Chicago. Ruml was active in the early phases of Rockefeller philanthropies. He poured Rockefeller resources into the social sciences in general and the SSRC in particular.

All three men channeled their progressive values into the cause of empirical research and knowledge. In his 2001 history of the SSRC, Kenton Worcester highlighted four aspects of their founding vision that remain central to this day:

1. Interdisciplinarity: The SSRC was constructed as a platform on which scholars from various disciplines and traditions (including the natural sciences and humanities) could come together in a spirit of problem-solving intellectual cross-fertilization.
2. Intermediary role: The federal government was not prepared to put its weight behind a central funding agency for the social sciences. Thus the SSRC frequently acted as an intermediary between researchers and research-supporting foundations, assuming the functions of assessing research priorities and disbursing research funds.
3. Institutional flexibility: The SSRC was designed to be as elastic as possible, to take advantage of changing social conditions and methods of investigation. Even in its early days, the Council's research planning committees were expected to carry out their work for a limited span of time, and for the same reason fellowship programs were kept going only as long as they were judged to be effective.
4. Scientific advance in the greater interests of society: The SSRC's founders believed that the social sciences should address real-world concerns. They wanted to see social science move in a more data-sensitive, empirical direction.

Starting in the mid-1920s the Council sponsored annual conferences and launched its Research Training Fellowships program.

Committees launched in the 1920s and 1930s included:

- Agriculture (1925–42)
- Crime (1925–32)
- Industrial Relations (1926–30)
- Business Research (1928–31)
- Pressure Groups and Propaganda (1931–34)
- Government Statistics and Information Services (1933–37)
- Social Security (1935–45)

One of the Council's first acts was to urge Congress to appropriate funds sufficient to allow the Library of Congress to publish an annual index of state laws. As early as 1923, the SSRC cooperated with the National Research Council in a study of human migration from a social standpoint, said to be the institution's first global endeavor.

Franklin D. Roosevelt served as a member of the Council's Advisory Committee on Business Research (1928–1931). After he became president, collaborations between administration officials, the Rockefeller Foundation, Council staff, and Council networks led to the committee work that accompanied the formulation and implementation of Social Security.

During World War II, the Council served as a bridge between the Roosevelt administration and the social sciences, working behind the scenes to ensure that qualified social scientists were placed with appropriate agencies. It joined forces with its humanities counterpart, the American Council of Learned Societies (ACLS), and other partners to form the Ethnogeographic Board, with the mission of providing information about unfamiliar societies with which the war was suddenly bringing Americans into contact. The Board developed a roster of people with specialized area knowledge and conducted a survey of nascent area studies programs in American universities.

=== Post-World War II ===
The identity of the Council in the latter half of the 20th century would closely overlap the development of area studies and the promotion of modernization theory.

In the wake of World War II, there was widespread consensus on the need for the United States to invest in international studies. Liberals and conservatives alike viewed the creation of a large brain trust of internationally oriented political scientists and economists as an urgent national priority. There was considerable tension, however, between those who felt strongly that, instead of applying Western models, social scientists should develop culturally and historically contextualized knowledge of various parts of the world by working closely with humanists, and those who thought that social scientists should seek to develop overarching macrohistorical theories that could draw connections between patterns of change and development across different geographies. The former became area studies advocates, the latter proponents of modernization theory.

In this context, the postwar SSRC had two separate agendas, which to some extent were at odds with each other because they entailed very different sets of methodological commitments: ideographic versus nomothetic. On the one hand, the SSRC was keen to join forces with the country's major foundations—most notably, the Ford Foundation, the Rockefeller Foundation, and the Carnegie Corporation of New York—to promote area studies. For this agenda, it already had a natural institutional partner, the American Council of Learned Societies; indeed, the two councils had worked during the war mapping out US-based foreign studies.

On the other hand, the SSRC also wished to promote behavioralist social science—an agenda that directly descended from Charles Merriam's prewar concerns.

To further its interests in area studies, the SSRC teamed up with the ACLS in administering Area Research Training Fellowships with funds from the Carnegie Corporation, and in forming the Committee on World Area Research. In the words of SSRC historian Eldrige Sibley: "[T]his committee served as the primary planning, coordinating and evaluating agency at the national level for the entire foreign area and language movement in the United States."

To further its behavioralist agenda, the SSRC set up various other committees—including, most notably, the Committee on Political Behavior, organized in 1945 by E. Pendleton Herring and headed at various times by David Truman, David Easton, and Robert Dahl, all of whom would serve as presidents of the American Political Science Association; and the Committee on Comparative Politics, organized in 1953 and headed by Gabriel Almond and then Lucian Pye, both of whom also became APSA presidents.

The SSRC's agenda for the behavioral social sciences largely came apart in the 1970s, leaving area studies as its central platform. By then, the SSRC and the ACLS had emerged as the national nexus for raising and administering funds for area studies. They created and managed about a dozen joint committees covering:

- Africa (1960–96)
- China (1981–96)
- Eastern Europe (1971–96)
- Japan (1967–96)
- Korea (1967–96)
- Latin America (1942–47; 1959–96)
- Muslim Societies (1985–93)
- Near and Middle East (1959–96)
- South Asia (1976–96)
- Southeast Asia (1976–96)
- Soviet Union (1983–96) [successor to Committee on Slavic and East European Studies (1971–77) and Slavic and East European Studies Committee (1948–71)]
- Western Europe (1975–96)

The joint SSRC-ACLS committees would accomplish most of their work—field development workshops, conferences, and publications—with funding from the Ford Foundation. In 1972 Ford conferred to the two councils the responsibility for managing its centerpiece program, the Foreign Area Fellowship Program (FAFP). For the next 30 years, the SSRC and the ACLS would award approximately 3,000 area studies dissertation fellowships and, with funds from other foundations as well, another 2,800 postdoctoral area studies research grants. In Kenton Worcester's words: "The cumulative total of awards for field research outside the United States was staggering."

Annual reports of the SSRC indicate that the area committees had an impressive record of productivity and influence on area studies and the disciplines they encompassed. In particular, scholars appeared to appreciate the fertile ground the SSRC/ACLS area committees provided for interdisciplinary scholarship. As Korea specialist Bruce Cumings put it: "For decades [these committees] offered a rare venue where one could see what a historian thought of the work of an economist, or what a literary critic thought of behavioralist sociology." According to Cumings, the SSRC was particularly appreciated as a meeting ground between traditional social science disciplines and area studies.

Even when area studies occupied center stage, the SSRC continued to support advanced research on social themes of the day. In the 1970s and 1980s, it convened committees addressing such topics as cognitive research, law and social science, international peace and security, states and social structures, the urban underclass, and urban migration.

The Council's forays into non-area studies were limited, however, by the challenges of the funding environment. In the immediate postwar period, the SSRC had benefited from unprecedented federal support of social and domestic programs, as well as increased public attention to social science research. But the growing tide of American conservatism, begun in the 1950s, eventually led to a populist backlash against federal funding of social research. By the time President Ronald Reagan assumed office, the political atmosphere had soured over the role of the social sciences and public investment in social research.

=== Post-Cold War ===
The end of the Cold War and the quickening pace of globalization turned the future of area studies into the number one issue for Council management in the concluding years of the 20th century. Under the stewardship of four successive presidents—David Featherman (1989–1995), Kenneth Prewitt (1995–1998), Orville Gilbert Brim Jr. (1998–1999), and Craig Calhoun (1999–2012)—the SSRC closed down its area committees in favor of a reorganized international program with thematic, trans-regional, and cross-cultural components. According to this vision, the area studies field would be transformed and integrated into traditional social science disciplines—especially, economics, sociology, and political science. Emphasis would shift from country and area to theme and context-sensitivity.

=== 2010s and 2020s ===
In the last two decades, the SSRC has been led by Ira Katznelson (2012–2017), Alondra Nelson (2017–2021), Anna Harvey (2021–2025), and Daniel Goroff (2026–present). In 2013, the SSRC established the College and University Fund, a consortium of higher education institutions. In 2015, the Council established the Anxieties of Democracy program to address concerns about democratic governments’ abilities to face pressing societal challenges. The program supported research on democratic governments’ responses to climate change, immigration, security threats, the performance and legitimacy of representative institutions and more.

In September 2017, Alondra Nelson succeeded Ira Katznelson as president. The same year, the SSRC launched the To Secure Knowledge task force, aiming to investigate the infrastructure of social science research, standards of inquiry and evidence, and the role rigorous understanding plays in public affairs. In 2020, the Council provided rapid response grants to sixty-two scholars, in support of social science research on the Covid-19 pandemic and its wide-ranging social, economic, cultural, and political effects. At the SSRC, Nelson established programs in the areas of new media and emerging technology; democracy and politics; international collaboration; and the study of inequality, including: the Social Data Initiative, "an ambitious research project that aimed to give academics access to troves of Facebook data in order to examine the platform's impact on democracy," MediaWell, a platform featuring research on social media, Democratic Anxieties in the Americas, the Transregional Collaboratory on the Indian Ocean, the Religion, Spirituality, and Democratic Renewal fellowship, and the COVID-19 and the Social Sciences platform.

In May 2021, Anna Harvey succeeded Alondra Nelson as the Council’s 15th president and CEO. In November 2021, the Social Science Research Council launched the Mercury Project, a three-year $25 million research consortium to support the development and testing of interventions to increase Covid-19 vaccination demand in Africa, Asia, Latin America and the Caribbean, and the United States. The Council celebrated its centennial in 2023, launching a website to commemorate 100 years of social science, as well as a $100 million centennial fundraising campaign and lecture series. In 2024, the Council launched the Agenda Fund initiative, which aims to “mobilize the research, policy, and philanthropic communities to identify the most promising opportunities for social and behavioral science research and development.”

In 2026, Daniel Goroff succeeded Anna Harvey as the Council’s 16th president.

The SSRC's records are stored at the Rockefeller Archive Center in Sleepy Hollow, New York.

=== Presidents ===
- Daniel Goroff (2026—)
- Anna Harvey (2021-2025)
- Alondra Nelson (2017–2021)
- Ira Katznelson (2012–2017)
- Craig Calhoun (1999–2012)
- Orville Gilbert Brim, Jr. (1998–99)
- Kenneth Prewitt (1995–98)
- David Featherman (1989–95)
- Frederic Wakeman, Jr. (1986–89)
- Francis X. Sutton (Acting President, 1985–86)
- Kenneth Prewitt (1979–85)
- Eleanor Sheldon (1972–79)
- Ralph W. Tyler (1971–72)
- Henry Riecken (1968–71)
- Edward Pendleton Herring (1948–68)

== Board of directors ==
As of 2026:

- Ingela Alger, Toulouse School of Economics, CNRS Senior Scientist (DR1)
- Bruce Carruthers, John D. MacArthur Professor of Sociology, Northwestern University
- Aaron "Ronnie" Chatterji, Professor of Business and Public Policy, Duke University
- Marc Feigen, Founder and CEO, Feigen Advisors
- Daniel Goroff, President, SSRC
- Sherry Glied, Professor of Public Service and former Dean, Robert F. Wagner Graduate School of Public Service, New York University
- William H. Janeway, Chair, Board of Directors, Investment Committee and Executive Committee Member; Warburg Pincus, Special Limited Advisor
- Ira Katznelson, Ruggles Professor of Political Science and History, Columbia University
- Naomi R. Lamoreaux, Executive Committee Member; Department of History, Yale University, Stanley B. Resor Professor
- Margaret Levenstein, Director, Inter-university Consortium for Political and Social Research (ICPSR), University of Michigan
- Johanna Mair, Director of the School of Transnational Governance and Professor of Organizations, Institutions, and Societal Transformation, European University Institute
- Bill Maurer, Dean of the School of Social Sciences and Professor of Anthropology, University of California, Irvine
- Gina Neff, Executive Director of the Minderoo Centre for Technology & Democracy at the University of Cambridge
- Melissa Nobles, Executive Committee Member; Chancellor and Professor of Political Science at the Massachusetts Institute of Technology
- Margaret O'Mara, Scott and Dorothy Bullitt Chair and Professor of American History, University of Washington
- Walter W. Powell, Executive Committee Member and Audit Committee Member; Organizational Behavior, Management Science and Engineering and Communication, Professor at Stanford University
- Raka Ray, Dean of the Social Sciences and a professor of sociology and South and Southeast Asia studies at the University of California, Berkeley
- Til Schuermann, Audit Committee Member and Treasurer; Oliver Wyman Risk & Public Policy Practice, Partner and Co-head
- Miguel Urquiola, Dean of the Social Sciences and Professor of Economics and International Affairs, Columbia University
- Edward Walker, Professor and Chair in the Department of Sociology, University of California, Los Angeles
- Philip Zecher, Michigan State University

== Fellowships and other awards ==
Since 1923, the SSRC has funded the research of over fifteen thousand fellows. Most SSRC fellowships are conducted through peer-reviewed competitions and offer support for predissertation, dissertation, postdoctoral and other research work. And, although most SSRC fellowships target the social sciences, a number also engage the humanities, the natural sciences, and relevant professional and practitioner communities.

The SSRC established the Albert O. Hirschman Prize in 2007 to recognize academic excellence in international, interdisciplinary social science research, theory, and public communication in the tradition of German-born American economist Albert O. Hirschman. The Hirschman Prize laureates are Dani Rodrik (2007), Charles Tilly (2009), Benedict Anderson (2011), Abhijit Banerjee and Esther Duflo (2014), Amartya Sen (2016), Sheila Jasanoff (2018), and James Scott (2020). In 2026, the SSRC awarded the inaugural Charles E. Lindblom Memorial, William H. Janeway, and Walter W. Powell Fellowships to three graduate students at member institutions of the College and University Fund for the Social Sciences.

== Resources ==
=== Landmark publications ===
Throughout the decades, SSRC research committees have produced edited volumes that helped to crystallize new fields and invigorate existing ones. Noteworthy titles include:

- Academically Adrift, by Richard Arum and Josipa Roksa (2011)
- The Power of Religion in the Public Sphere, ed. Eduardo Mendieta and Jonathan VanAntwerpen (2011)
- Privatization of Risk Book Series, ed. Craig Calhoun and Jacob S. Hacker (2008–09)
- The Measure of America: American Human Development Report 2008-2009, ed. Sarah Burd-Sharps, Kristen Lewis, and Eduardo Borges Martins (2008)
- After September 11 Book Series, (2002–06)
- Market Cultures, ed. Robert W. Hefner (1998)
- Social Suffering, ed. Arthur Kleinman, Veena Das, and Margaret Lock (1997)
- The Culture of National Security, ed. Peter J. Katzenstein (1996)
- The "Underclass" Debate, ed. Michael B. Katz (1993)
- Dual City, ed. John H. Mollenkopf and Manuel Castells (1991)
- The Politics of Numbers, ed. William Alonso and Paul Starr (1987)
- Law and the Social Sciences, ed. Leon Lipsor and Stanton Wheeler (1986)
- Life Course Dynamics, ed. Glen H. Elder, Jr. (1985)
- Bringing the State Back In, ed. Peter B. Evans, Dietrich Rueschemeyer, and Theda Skocpol (1985)
- Karma: An Anthropological Enquiry, ed. Charles F. Keyes and E. Valentine Daniel (1983)
- Organizing Interests in Western Europe, ed. Suzanne Berger (1981)
- The New Authoritarianism in Latin America, ed. David Collier (1979)
- The Breakdown of Democratic Regimes [series], ed. Juan Linz and Alfred Stepan (1978)
- The Formation of National States in Western Europe, ed. Charles Tilly (1975)

== Notable fellows and committee members ==
Pioneering American political scientist Gabriel Almond (1911–2002) held awards from the SSRC in 1935–1936 and again in 1946–1947. While serving on an SSRC committee, he accomplished critical work in the development of comparative politics as a field.

Nobel Peace Prize winner Ralph J. Bunche (1903–1971) held an SSRC research training fellowship in 1936–1938.

Presidential biographer James MacGregor Burns (born 1918) has held two SSRC awards: a demobilization award in 1946–1947, and a research training award in 1949.

Historian John Hope Franklin (1915–2009) was a recipient of an SSRC fellowship in the early part of his career. From 1956 to 1961, he served on the SSRC's long-running Grants-in-Aid Committee.

Canadian-American economist John Kenneth Galbraith (1908–2006) had a research training fellowship in 1937–1938.

Historian Peter Gay (born 1923) was a research training fellow in 1950–1951.

Morris Janowitz (1919–1988), a prominent sociologist at the University of Chicago who specialized in the sociology of the military, received a demobilization award, 1946–1947.

Simon Kuznets (1901–1985), a Nobel laureate in economics, led the SSRC Committee on Economic Growth from 1949–1968. His long involvement with the SSRC began in 1925, when he was a research fellow studying economic patterns in prices. In 1961, Kuznets headed a new SSRC committee on the Economy of China.

Harold D. Lasswell (1902–1978) was among the earliest SSRC research fellows (1928–1929). He went on to become a prominent political scientist and president of ASPA.

Owen Lattimore (1900–1989), a prominent anthropologist of China and Central Asia, especially Mongolia, held a research fellowship in 1929–1930.

Political sociologist Seymour Martin Lipset (1922–2006) held a field fellowship in 1945–1946. One of the results was his award-winning book Political Man (1960), which remains thought provoking to this day.

World-renowned cultural anthropologist Margaret Mead (1901–1978) held a research fellowship in 1928–1929.

Economist and Nobel laureate Douglass C. North (born 1920), best known for his work on new institutional economics, was an economic history fellow, 1949–1950.

Former Secretary of State Condoleezza Rice (born 1954) is a former SSRC board member.

Economist W.W. Rostow (1916–2003), best known for his work on the stages of economic growth, was a field fellow in 1939–1940.

Former Secretary of State George P. Shultz (born 1920) was a research training fellow in 1947–1948.

Marxist economist Paul Sweezy (1910–2004), best known for his work Monopoly Capital, received a demobilization award in 1945–1946.

Economist and Nobel laureate James Tobin (1918–2002) was a research training fellow in 1946–1947.

Albert Wohlstetter (1913–1997), the architect of US nuclear security policy, was a field fellow in 1940–1941.

Historian and President of the Southern Historical Association Francis Butler Simkins (1897–1866) held a research fellowship.

== Assets ==
As of 2024 the Social Science Research Council had assets of $72,277,885.
