= David A. Strand =

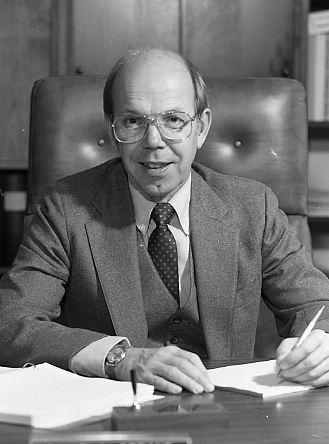

Fifteenth President of Illinois State University
- In office 1995–1999
- Preceded by: Thomas Wallace
- Succeeded by: Victor Boschini

Personal details
- Born: 1935 (age 90–91) Menominee Michigan

David A. Strand (born 1935) was the fifteenth president of Illinois State University, located in Normal, Illinois. He served at the university, in various capacities, consistently from 1978 until his retirement in 1999. He served as the university's president from 1995 to 1999 and helped gain ground on much of the school's educational revamping. He helped Illinois State University match up to other peer schools in the nation.

== Early life ==
David A. Strand was born in 1935, near the Upper Peninsula of Michigan in Menominee). He and his family had relocated to Evanston, Illinois in his early childhood. He attended Evanston Township High School and went on to pursue his higher education at both Carroll University and Indiana University.

== Education ==
Upon graduating high school, Strand went on to attend Carroll College (later renamed Carroll University) in Waukesha, WI. He pursued a bachelor's degree and graduated in four years. Post-bachelor's, he went on to attend Indiana University in Bloomington, Indiana. There, he pursued both a master's degree and a doctoral degree. He completed his studies with a Doctorate of Education, intending to pursue various roles in educational leadership. After his graduation circa 1959, Strand held a variety of leadership roles, namely at Southeast Missouri State University in Cape Girardeau, Missouri. It was there that he met former Illinois State University president Lloyd Watkins, who later elected Strand into the university's executive office.

== Leadership ==
After serving a variety of positions (including serving as interim president) at Southeast Missouri, Strand was elected as an executive officer at Illinois State University by Watkins, who was then serving as the school's president (circa 1979). Two years after his start at Illinois State, Strand was upgraded to vice president of the Business and Finance department. This put him at the forefront of the university's financial administration. In 1984, he was elected as provost of the Business and Finance department, after serving a year in an interim position. Eventually, the department replaced Strand with fellow staff member John Urice. A year later, Strand was once again promoted, this time as interim President of the entire university. He was thought to be a good fit for the position by several other members of the university administration.

Strand initially planned to retire in 1996, prior to his time as interim president. Once elected officially, he served as the school's leader from 1995 to 1999, and an attempt to find a successor had begun in 1998. Some of Strand's main concerns upon adopting the presidency were to fuel university enhancement, match employee salary to those of peer schools, and to stabilize yearly enrollment rates. He also made an extreme initiative to acquire funding (though the university's debt limit hit capacity) to revamp the Science building. Without the 6 million in funding he procured, the building would not be usable. He emphasized the functionality of university facilities, in preparation for the steady enrollment that was expected. Within a few years of his presidency, the university reached within 2 percent of Strand's enrollment goal.

During his time at Illinois State, Strand created the University Studies Review Committee, a group that recommended and oversaw changes to the University Studies program. In 1992, the university initially voted in rejection of this plan, but Strand worked to re-evaluate it. The university's primary concern with this plan was the requirement for all freshman students to take Foundations of Inquiry (FOI), an introductory course that the school found ineffective and out-of-reach for student success. Eventually, the university re-established a new educational plan that fit students' needs. This initiative became the Pilot Implementation Committee, which assisted faculty in creating course ideas and proposals. Strand was at the forefront of approving or disapproving ideas for coursework. He also dealt with concerns about the type of coursework required in General Education, as some were concerned about the lack of typical Eurocentric courses, such as Western Civilization.

By his resignation from Illinois State University on June 30, 1999, David A. Strand had served at the school for nearly 21 years. He served positions such as Vice President of Business and Finance, Executive Officer, Provost, and eventually President. He was renowned as a hardworking individual who places a strong emphasis on communication and team-building.

== Legacy ==
Strand is best remembered for his first state of the university address, in which he recognized what he called the "Four C's": cooperation, collaboration, communication, and civility. He emphasized a push on many of the educational and structural goals the university held prior to his entrance. Post-departure, Strand continued to teach at the school under the Educational Administration Foundation. He continues to be active in the surrounding area of the university community and is president of the Immanuel Bible Foundation. He also continues to serve on the Heritage Committee for the Second Presbyterian Church in Bloomington, Illinois.

Academic offices
Preceded by Thomas Wallace	15th President of Illinois State University; 1995 – 1999	Succeeded by Victor Boschini
