= Daniel Goroff =

Daniel L. Goroff
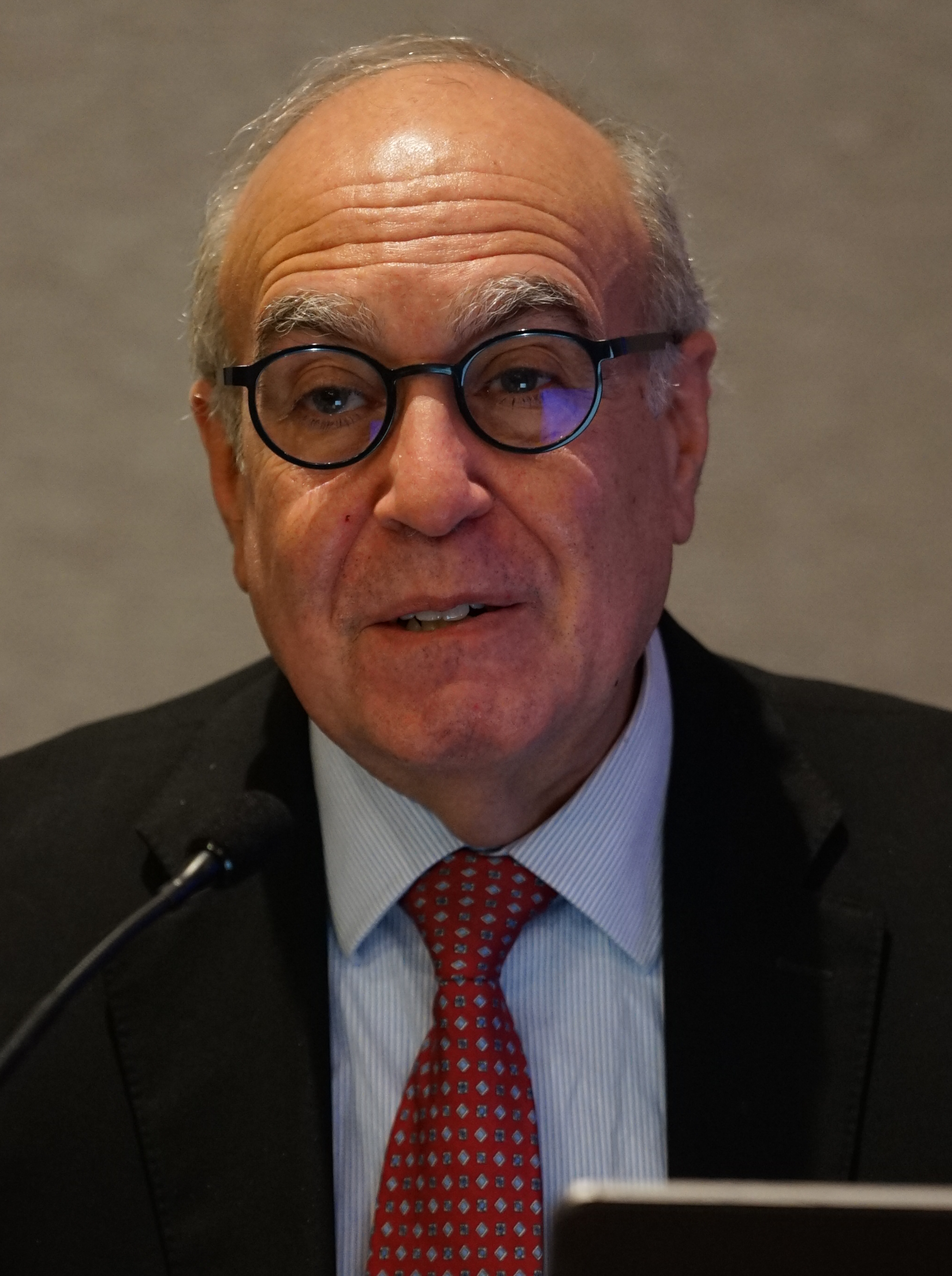
- Goroff at ASSA 2026
- Education: Harvard University, University of Cambridge, Princeton University
- Known for: Dynamical systems, Science and technology policy
- Scientific career
- Fields: Mathematics, Economics, Science policy
- Workplaces: Alfred P. Sloan Foundation, Harvard University, Harvey Mudd College
- Doctoral advisor: William Thurston

Daniel L. Goroff is an American mathematician, social scientist, and academic administrator, and U.S. government official.

He is currently President and CEO of the Social Science Research Council, an independent nonprofit founded in 1923 to "mobilize social science for the public good."

== Education ==
Goroff received his B.A. summa cum laude and an M.A. degree from Harvard University. He then attended the University of Cambridge as a Churchill Scholar, earning an M.Phil. in economics.

He completed his Ph.D. in mathematics at Princeton University as a Danforth Scholar under the supervision of John Mather and Harold Kuhn. He also holds a Masters Degree in Mathematical Finance.

== Career ==
Goroff spent over twenty years at Harvard University as a Professor of the Practice of Mathematics and Associate Dean of Harvard College.

He later served at Harvey Mudd College as Professor of Mathematics and Economics, Dean of the Faculty, and Vice President for Academic Affairs.

Before leading the Social Science Research Council, Goroff served as Vice President and Program Director at the Alfred P. Sloan Foundation, where he managed both its Economics Programs and the Sloan Research Fellows Program.

In Washington, he has been a Division Director at the National Academies and at the National Science Foundation.

Goroff has also worked three times at the White House Office of Science and Technology Policy (OSTP), most recently as Deputy Executive Director, leading the Science and Society division.

Daniel Goroff is an elected member of the American Academy of Arts and Sciences.

== Research and publications ==
His research focuses on celestial mechanics and dynamical systems.

He is particularly noted for his work on the history of mathematics, including his extensive editing and translation of Henri Poincaré's Les Méthodes Nouvelles de la Mécanique Céleste.
