= Anna Harvey (social scientist) =

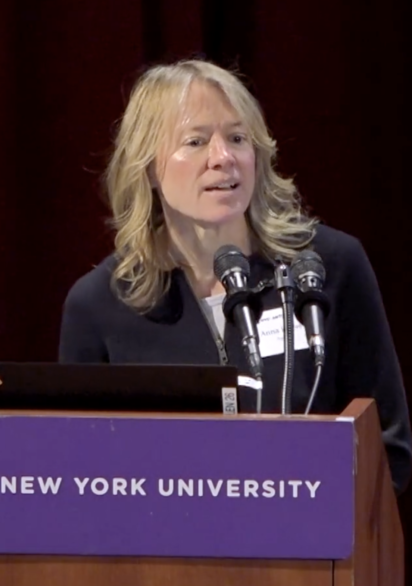
- Citizenship: United States

Academic background
- Education: Honors Tutorial College, Ohio University; Princeton University

Academic work
- Discipline: Criminal justice Political economy
- Institutions: New York University

Anna Harvey is an American social scientist whose research is focused on criminal justice and judicial decisionmaking. From 2021 to 2025 she was the 15th President and CEO of the Social Science Research Council. She is also Professor of Politics and founder and Director of the Public Safety Lab at New York University. She is a National Trustee of Ohio University.

== Education and career ==
Harvey received a B.A. in political science from the Honors Tutorial College at Ohio University in 1988 and a Ph.D. in Politics from Princeton University in 1995. She joined New York University in 1994 and is currently Professor of Politics, Affiliated Professor of Data Science, and Affiliated Professor of Law at New York University. She chaired the university's Department of Politics from 2000 until 2004 and served as Interim Dean of the Graduate School of Arts and Science from 2015 until 2017. She founded the Public Safety Lab at New York University in 2017 and remains its director.

== Research ==
Harvey's early work investigated social dynamics of electoral behavior that may generate positive returns to coordination in both partisanship and turnout. She explored the empirical implications of social coordination effects in a series of articles and in her first book, Votes without Leverage: Women in American Electoral Politics, 1920-1970.

=== Judicial decisionmaking ===
In a series of articles and the book, A Mere Machine: The Supreme Court, Congress, and American Democracy, Harvey explored the responsiveness of Supreme Court decisions to congressional preferences. Harvey reported evidence indicating that, even in constitutional cases, the U.S. Supreme Court defers to congressional preferences, in particular to the preferences of majorities in the House of Representatives (the chamber that originates both impeachment and appropriations actions).

Harvey also found that the Court's rejection of congressionally-enacted restrictions on campaign spending led to increases in the conservatism of state and congressional legislators, and that the Supreme Court's strike of the public accommodations protections in the 1875 Civil Rights Law led to weight losses for Black Civil Army veterans in states without state-level public accommodations statutes, but not for white Civil Army veterans (with Emily A. West).

In Judicial Decision-Making: A Coursebook (with Tom S. Clark, Barry Friedman, Allison Larsen, Margaret H. Lemos, and Andrew D. Martin), Harvey and co-authors integrated approaches to judicial decision-making drawn from both the social sciences and from legal thought.

=== Criminal justice ===
Since the founding of the Public Safety Lab in 2017, Harvey's work has been in the area of criminal justice. One project explored the role of financial incentives in law enforcement, finding that law enforcement in the province of Saskatchewan was responsive to a discontinuity in the rules allocating the distribution of traffic ticket revenue. Another project investigated racial disparities in law enforcement, finding that litigation leading to affirmative action plans in law enforcement reduced racial disparities in crime victimization. A project on racial disparities in criminal appeals found that intermediate appellate court judges in New York State serving on all-white panels were significantly less likely to rule in favor of Black defendants in their reappointment terms.

== Publications ==
- Votes without Leverage: Women in American Electoral Politics, 1920-1970 (Political Economy of Institutions and Decisions) (1998) ISBN 978-0521592390
- A Mere Machine: The Supreme Court, Congress, and American Democracy (2014) ISBN 978-0300205770
- Judicial Decision-Making: A Coursebook (with Tom Clark, Barry Friedman, Allison Larsen, Margaret Lemos, and Andrew Martin) (2020) ISBN 978-1642422573
