= Terri Goss Kinzy =

American biochemist and academic administrator

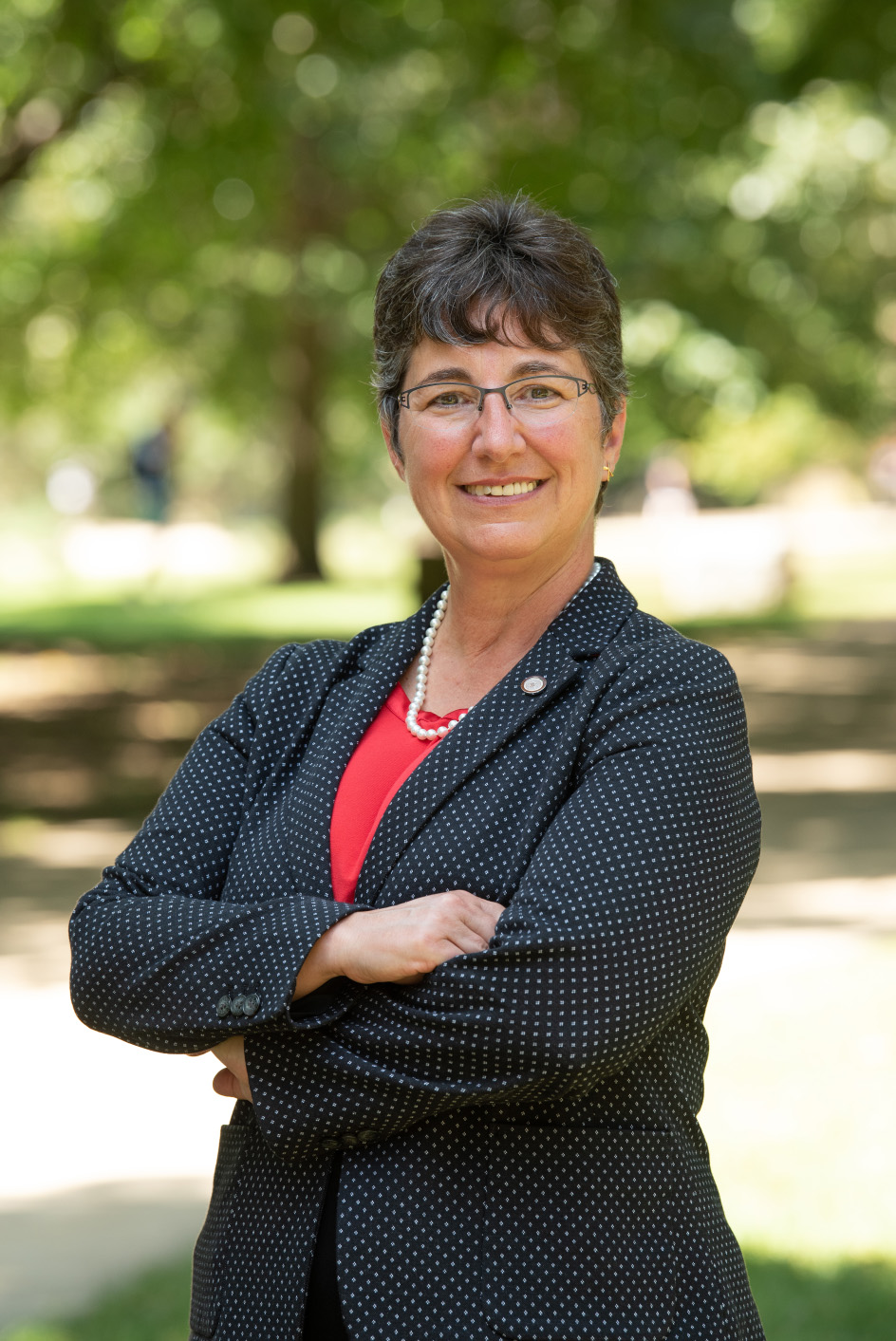
- Kinzy in 2021

20th President of Illinois State University
- In office July 1, 2021 – February 14, 2023
- Preceded by: Larry Dietz
- Succeeded by: Aondover Tarhule (Interim)

Personal details
- Born: Canton, Ohio, U.S.
- Children: 2
- Education: University of Akron; Case Western Reserve University
- Occupation: Biochemist, academic administrator
- Scientific career
- Fields: Biochemistry
- Workplaces: Rutgers University; Western Michigan University; Illinois State University
- Thesis: Characterization of GTP and aminoacyl-tRNA binding to eukaryotic initiation factor 2 and elongation factor 1 (1991)
- Doctoral advisor: William C. Merrick

Terri Goss Kinzy is an American biochemist, educator, and academic administrator. From 2021 to 2023, she served as the 20th President of Illinois State University.

== Early life and education ==
Kinzy was born in Canton, Ohio. Kinzy was partly inspired by a high school physics teacher to pursue a career in science.

She completed a B.S. in chemistry, magna cum laude, at the University of Akron in 1985. Kinzy was a chemist at BP America in Warrensville Heights, Ohio from 1985 to 1987, focusing on biofuel development. Kinzy completed a Ph.D. in biochemistry at the Case Western Reserve University. Her doctoral advisor was William C. Merrick Ph.D. She was a postdoctoral researcher in molecular genetics at Carnegie Mellon University under advisor John L. Woolford Jr.

== Career and research ==
She joined Rutgers University in 1995 as an assistant professor in the department of molecular genetics, microbiology, and immunology. She became a tenured professor in 2004. In 2007, she became a professor in the Department of Pediatrics at the Robert Wood Johnson Medical School. She served as the Senior Associate Dean of the Rutgers Graduate School of Biomedical Sciences from October 2007 to August 2013. That was followed by service as Associate Vice-President for Research Administration from 2013–15.

In 2016, Kinzy became Vice President for Research.

In 2018, Kinzy joined Western Michigan University as its vice president for research and innovation, concurrently holding the rank of professor of biological sciences.

She has served on, or chaired, study sections for both the National Institutes of Health and the National Science Foundation.

On July 1, 2021, she succeeded Larry Dietz as the 20th president of Illinois State University. She was the first female president of the university. In February 2023, Kinzy resigned from her position as President of the University.

Kinzy has made significant contributions to the field of eukaryotic protein translation, in particular the essential roles of elongation factors in this process. Kinzy's research showed that elongation factors have additional roles outside of protein synthesis, including in the regulation of the actin cytoskeleton.

== Awards and memberships ==
Kinzy has earned international acclaim for her research and leadership. In 2016, Kinzy became a Fellow of the American Association for the Advancement of Science. She has also chaired the membership and public affairs advisory committees of the American Society for Biochemistry and Molecular Biology (ASBMB).

She has also served as a member of the Association for Public and Land-Grant Universities Council on Research Executive Committee. In 2003, she was named a Fellow in the prestigious Hedwig van Ameringen Executive Leadership in Academic Medicine Program.

In addition, Kinzy was selected for the University Master Educator Guild in 2001. Further, she has also received the New Jersey Association for Biomedical Research Outstanding Mentor Award and the R. Walter Schlesinger Basic Science Mentoring Award.

In 2004, Kinzy was named the Woman of the Year in Medicine for Somerset County, N.J., and was a Crain’s Detroit Notable Woman in STEM (Science, Technology, Engineering, and Mathematics) in 2019.

== Personal life ==
Kinzy graduated from Louisville High School in Ohio in 1980. She was born across the street from the Pro Football Hall of Fame. Her father was a used-car salesman, while her mother, a vocational school graduate, worked as a bookkeeper. Kinzy was a first-generation college student.

Kinzy’s husband, Scott, is a chemist. The couple met during their undergraduate days at the University of Akron.
