= Eleanor Bernert Sheldon =

American sociologist (1920–2021)

Eleanor Harriet Bernert Sheldon (March 19, 1920 – May 8, 2021) was an American sociologist who was president of the Social Science Research Council (SSRC) from 1972 to 1979, and was one of the key pioneers in the use of social indicators in sociology. In the 1970s, as multinational corporations recognized the need to appoint women to their boards of directors, Sheldon became the first woman to serve on the boards of several major companies, including Citibank, Mobil, Heinz, and Equitable Holdings.

== Education and career ==
Sheldon was an alumna of Colby-Sawyer College, graduating in 1940, and the University of North Carolina at Chapel Hill, graduating in 1942. After working in Washington DC in the Office of Population Research, Bureau of Agricultural Economics, and Department of Agriculture, she completed her Ph.D. in 1949 as a William Rainey Harper Fellow at the University of Chicago. She taught sociology at Columbia University from 1951 to 1952, and in the late 1950s and early 1960s, worked in the school of nursing at the University of California, Los Angeles. Prior to joining the SSRC as president, she worked at the Russell Sage Foundation.

== Books ==
Sheldon wrote or edited multiple books, including:

- Local Community Fact Book of Chicago (edited as Eleanor H. Bernert with Louis Wirth, University of Chicago Press, 1949)
- America's Children (as Eleanor H. Bernert, John Wiley & Sons, 1958)
- Pupils and Schools in New York City: a Fact Book (with Raymond A. Glazier, Russell Sage Foundation, 1965)
- Indicators of Social Change: Concepts and Measurements (with Wilbert E. Moore, Russell Sage Foundation, 1968)
- Family Economic Behavior: Problems and Perspectives (J. B. Lippincott & Co., 1973)

== Recognition ==
In 1971, she was elected as a Fellow of the American Statistical Association. She was also a fellow of the American Academy of Arts and Sciences. In 1991 she won the distinguished alumnus award of the University of North Carolina.

== Family Life ==
Sheldon was born as Eleanor Harriet Bernert on March 19, 1920, in Hartford, Connecticut to M.G. and Fannie (Myers) Bernert. She had 2 children named John Anthony Sheldon and James Sheldon Jr to James Sheldon Sr.
