= E. Pendleton Herring =

American political scientist

E. Pendleton Herring (October 27, 1903 – August 17, 2004) was an American political scientist who worked to advance the field of political science with his work as president of the American Political Science Association (APSA). In addition to working as the 48th president of the APSA Pendleton Herring also served as secretary of Graduate education for Public Administration at Harvard. Pendleton's scholarly works had a large impact on American political science and also influenced the American government acting as chief intellectual architect of the National Security Act of 1947, which culminated in the reorganization of the military and intelligence branches of the federal government including the creation of the Department of Defense and the Central Intelligence Agency. Herring is considered one of the most important political scientist of his generation and his influence has helped shaped political science as behavioral science.

== Life and education ==
Born in Baltimore, Maryland, on October 27, 1903, to parents Dr. Arthur Pendleton Herring and Agnes Kinney Herring, Edward Pendleton Herring was one of six children. Edward Pendleton Herring later dropped his first name, preferring to be called his middle name. In 1913 Pendleton Herring attended Woodrow Wilson's inauguration which created a lasting impression for Herring leading him into a career in political science. Pendleton Herring attended Johns Hopkins University in Baltimore, Maryland and received his bachelor's degree in English in 1925. Pendleton then attended graduate school to receive his Ph.D. in political science in 1928. During his time in graduate school, Pendleton was taught constitutional law by Frank J. Goodnow, the first president of the American Political Science Association. During his graduate studies Herring wrote a dissertation titled Group Representation Before Congress, which studied the effects of pressure groups in government. Pendleton's work was published in 1929 and became one of the primary studies regarding pressure groups and political behavior. In 1933 Pendleton Herring married Katherine Channing. Pendleton and his wife had two children, H. James Herring and Thomas S. Herring. In 1969 Pendleton's wife Katherine died and Herring remarried in 1971 to Virginia Staman Wood. E. Pendleton Herring died at the age of 100 from pneumonia on August 17, 2004, at his home in Princeton, New Jersey.

== Career ==
=== Harvard ===
Pendleton Herring started working at Harvard University in the fall of 1928, where he worked in the Government Department. In 1936 Pendleton was appointed as secretary of Harvard's newly created Graduate School of Public Administration where he helped to develop its teaching programs. During Pendleton's tenure at Harvard he published six books, his first being the previously mentioned Group Representation Before Congress which was published in 1929. Public Administration and the Public Interest which was Pendleton's second book and Federal Commissioners: A Study of Their Careers and Qualifications, Pendleton's third book, both were published in 1938. Both books dealt with the topic of public administration which was Herring's focus as the secretary of the Graduate School of Public Administration. Herring's next two books, Presidential Leadership: The Political Relations of Congress and the Chief Executive and The Politics of Democracy: American Political Parties in Action were both published in 1940. Herring's final book written during his tenure at Harvard was The Impact of War: Our American Democracy under Arms which was published in 1941. The Impact of War came to the attention of Ferdinand Eberstadt who was a member of the War Production Board. The two collaborated on a way to combine the military branches of the government under one administrative organization and the two were considered the intellectual architects of National Security Act of 1947 which created The National Security Council the Department of Defense and the Central Intelligence Agency. In 1945 after the war Pendleton resigned from his position at Harvard and accepted an offer to work for the Carnegie Corporation.

=== Social Science Research Council ===
In 1948 Pendleton Herring became president of the Social Science Research Council. During his twenty-year presidency the SSRC became one of the leading organizations in the advancement of social science. Herring's goals were to increase the quality of research by taking better information and analyzing it with stricter methods. Pendleton also strived to make the information available to policy makers to aid in decision making. During Pendleton's twenty year presidency the SSRC budget was quadrupled from less than $500,000 to $2,000,000 annually. Pendleton Herring's presidency drew many leading scholars to the SSRC to serve on boards and committees. In 1962 during his presidency Pendleton Herring also became the president of the Woodrow Wilson Foundation and in 1968 Herring retired from the SSRC.

=== Woodrow Wilson Foundation ===
In 1968 E. Pendleton Herring became the president of the Woodrow Wilson Foundation. As president of the Woodrow Wilson Foundation Pendleton was active in persuading the Johnson administration and the Congress to create the Woodrow Wilson International Center for Scholars which was built in Washington, D.C.. Herring also help with the project of publishing The Papers of Woodrow Wilson. Herring served as president of the Woodrow Wilson Foundation for nearly thirty years.

== Awards ==
Pendleton Herring received many awards for his work across his career as a political scientist. In 1946 Pendleton received the Navy Citation and Distinguished Civilian Service Award in 1946 for his efforts with Ferdinand Eberstadt and his study on combining the military branches. Pendleton also received the Charles E. Merriam award in 1979 for his work in public service and the James Madison Award in 1987 in for his scholarship.
