= Victor Boschini =

American academic administrator

Victor J. Boschini Jr.

10th Chancellor of Texas Christian University
- In office 2003 – 2025, 2026-present
- Preceded by: Michael R. Ferrari
- Succeeded by: Daniel W. Pullin

16th President of Illinois State University
- In office 1999–2003
- Preceded by: David A. Strand
- Succeeded by: Alvin Bowman

Personal details
- Born: 1956 (age 69–70) Cleveland, Ohio
- Education: Mount Union College (BA); Bowling Green State University (MA); Indiana University (PhD)

Academic background
- Thesis: Socialization processes in a nonresidential student subculture (1989)
- Doctoral advisor: George Kuh

Academic work
- Discipline: Education
- Institutions: Indiana University; Butler University; Illinois State University; Texas Christian University

Victor J. Boschini Jr. (born 1956) is the current chancellor at Texas Christian University. He first assumed office as the university's tenth chancellor on June 1, 2003, and his tenure concluded May 31, 2025. However, on October 22, 2026, the resignation of his successor Daniel W. Pullin would trigger his reappointment as chancellor. He was previously president of Illinois State University.

== Early life ==
Born in Cleveland, Ohio, son of Victor Sr. and Elizabeth Boschini, is an alum of Normandy High School. He received his bachelor's degree from Mount Union College in 1978. He was awarded a Master of Arts degree in personnel from Bowling Green State University in 1979. His doctorate was awarded to him at Indiana University in 1989 in higher education administration.

== Career ==
Boschini came to TCU after serving as president of Illinois State University from 1999 to 2003. At Illinois State, Boschini also was associate professor in the Department of Educational Administration and Foundations in the College of Education and taught a class each semester throughout his presidency. In addition, Boschini was a member of the board of directors of the Illinois Campus Compact, a coalition of college and university presidents committed to helping students develop the values and skills of citizenship through participation in public and community service.

Boschini led a major fundraising campaign while at Illinois State. It was also during his tenure the university established its first endowed chair.

From 1997 to 1999, Boschini served as Illinois State's vice president for Student Affairs.

Prior to his tenure at Illinois State, he was associate provost at Butler University in Indianapolis, Indiana, and also taught in Butler's College of Education. He previously spent eight years at Indiana University in various administrative posts, as well as teaching in the university's School of Education.

Boschini serves on the board of the State Farm Company Mutual Funds, as well as on the boards of the Fort Worth Symphony Orchestra and the Van Cliburn Foundation. He is also a member of the Board of Trustees of Brite Divinity School. In early March, 2011, Boschini was elected to the board of trustees of the American Council on Education (ACE).

In a 2021 interview with the Fort Worth Star-Telegram, Boschini indicated that he plans to retire in 2026.

== General references ==
Academic offices
Preceded by David A. Strand	16th President of Illinois State University; 1999 – 2003	Succeeded by Alvin Bowman
Preceded by Michael R. Ferrari	10th President of Texas Christian University; 2003 – current	Succeeded by current
