= Raymond W. Fairchild =

American college administrator and football coach

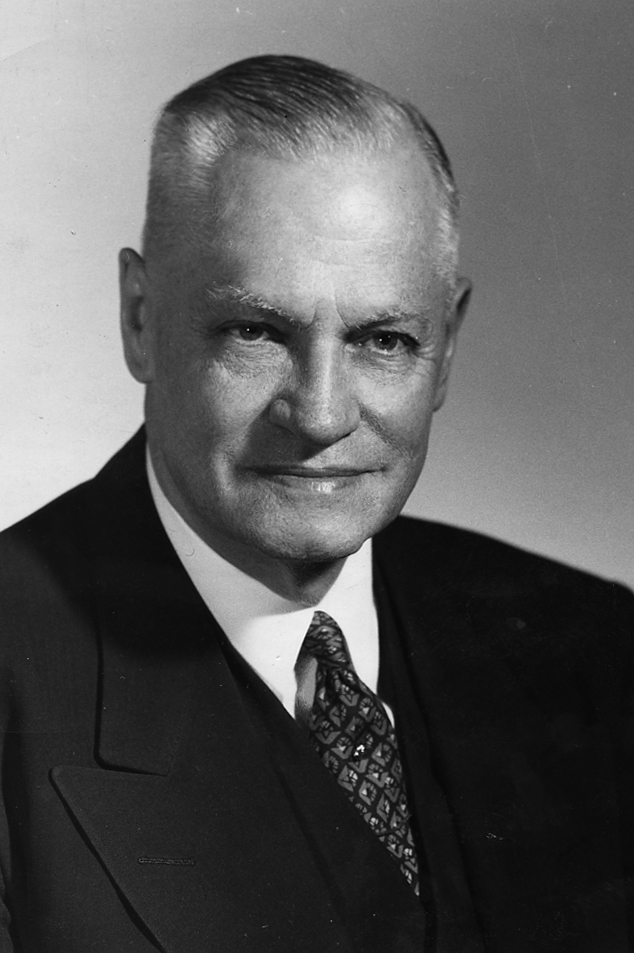

Eighth president of Illinois State University
- In office 1933–1955
- Preceded by: Harry A. Brown
- Succeeded by: Robert Gehlmann Bone

Personal details
- Born: September 9, 1889 Bismarck, Illinois, U.S.
- Died: June 12, 1956 (aged 66) Normal, Illinois, U.S.
- Education: Michigan (AB, AM)

Raymond Wilber Fairchild (September 9, 1889- June 12, 1956) was a college educator known for his twenty-two years as the eighth president of Illinois State University, formerly known as Illinois State Normal University.

== Early life and education ==
Raymond W. Fairchild was born on September 9, 1889, in Bismarck, Illinois, to Wilber Daniel Fairchild, a Methodist minister and former professor at Illinois Wesleyan University, and Serena Mattie Johnson Fairchild. After attending Illinois public schools, he attended the University of Michigan where he earned a Bachelors of Arts in biology in 1909. In 1913, he married Nellie Bronson on June 25. He also attended the University of Chicago and earned a Master's of Arts degree in 1919. During the time of his presidency at ISU, he attended Northwestern University and earned a PhD in 1935.

== Professional career ==
After graduating from the University of Michigan, he became the principal of the Vandalia High School from 1909 to 1910, then the principal of the Moline High School from 1910 to 1914, both in Illinois. From 1914 to 1920, Fairchild was the dean of men and head of the Biology Department at University of Wisconsin-Stevens Point, formerly known as Stevens Point Normal. Fairchild also served as the Stevens Point Normal head football coach from 1917 to 1918. He then became the superintendent of schools in Fond du Lac, Wisconsin from 1920 to 1923. After this, Fairchild became the superintendent of schools in Elgin, Illinois from 1923 to 1930. From 1930 to 1933, he became an educator and the head of the Chicago Campus, formerly known as the McKinlock Campus, at Northwestern University before he took the role as president of Illinois State Normal University. He was also active in many community, state, and national education and civic groups including being the president of the Bloomington-Normal Community Chest, then a board member of the Normal Methodist Church and a member of the Bloomington YMCA board.

=== Head coaching record ===
Year	Team	Overall	Conference	Standing	Bowl/playoffs
Stevens Point Pointers (Inter-Normal Athletic Conference of Wisconsin) (1917–1918)
1917	Stevens Point	5–1–1	2–1–1	4th	
1918	Stevens Point	1–1	NA	NA	
Stevens Point:		6–2–1	2–1–1		
Total:		6–2–1			

== Presidency at Illinois State Normal University ==
Fairchild was eighth president of Illinois State Normal University from 1933 to 1955, making him the second-longest running president in University history. He was the first president to have a doctorate, which helped legitimize the university. He wrote his PhD dissertation on the "Administrative Practices in the Improvement of Teacher Education in State Teachers College" in which he implemented some of the practices within ISNU. In 1930, the university lost accreditation on several points, one citing the inadequate preparation of its faculty. Fairchild was hired in order to help rectify accreditation issues and implement his proposed practices from his dissertation. Some of the practices include raising admissions standards, encouraging faculty to obtain advanced degrees, and forging closer ties between the university and the public schools. However, there were two underlying assumptions from his dissertation that he used to guide his presidency: it is the president's responsibility is to oversee teacher preparation and institutions, like Normal, should not become liberal arts colleges. Some modern scholars believe that Fairchild was ultimately unsuccessful in carrying out Normal's mission to satisfy the social and economic aspirations of the American people. This is partly due to his belief that ISNU should not become a liberal college, particularly after World War II, when people wanted a liberal arts education. Fairchild equated professionalism with conformity to middle-class values and conduct which led to, in 1935, the establishment of a campus chapter of the American Association of University Professors. Also, in 1951, the same rigidity led to the creation of the University Council which was the first time the faculty obtained a formal say in the governance of the ISNU.

During the 1930s, Fairchild laid the foundations for what remains one of the primary missions of Illinois State University and that is upgrading the skills and knowledge of in-service teachers throughout the State through campus conferences, course offerings, and extension courses. Overall, he was said to be best known, within educational circles, as a champion of teacher-education. Educational changes during his tenure included the university dropping two-year curricula and adding graduate work. This change also made ISNU the first college in the state to offer graduate work regularly, leading to master's degrees and broadening the area of teacher education, especially for special education. Fairchild recognized the need to prepare special education teachers for state schools. In 1943, the Board approved the creation of the Division of Special Education at the university - the first such program in the state. Modern scholars suggest that Fairchild deserves credit for raising the professional credentials of ISNU faculty and encouraging them to engage in research. Fairchild was also able to acquire federal funding to finance campus buildings, some which are still used today.

== Death ==
Fairchild retired in 1955. On June 12, 1965, Fairchild died in Normal, Illinois, after two years of illness. His funeral was also held on campus in the Capen Auditorium.

== Legacy ==
In 1951, the university dedicated the special education building in honor of Fairchild. The new building was officially named Fairchild Hall in 1955, shortly after his resignation. At the time of his death, the university had improved significantly, but not without hardships, compared to before his presidency. The population of staff and students increased by 50%.
