= Samuel Braden =

American academic administrator

Samuel Edward Braden
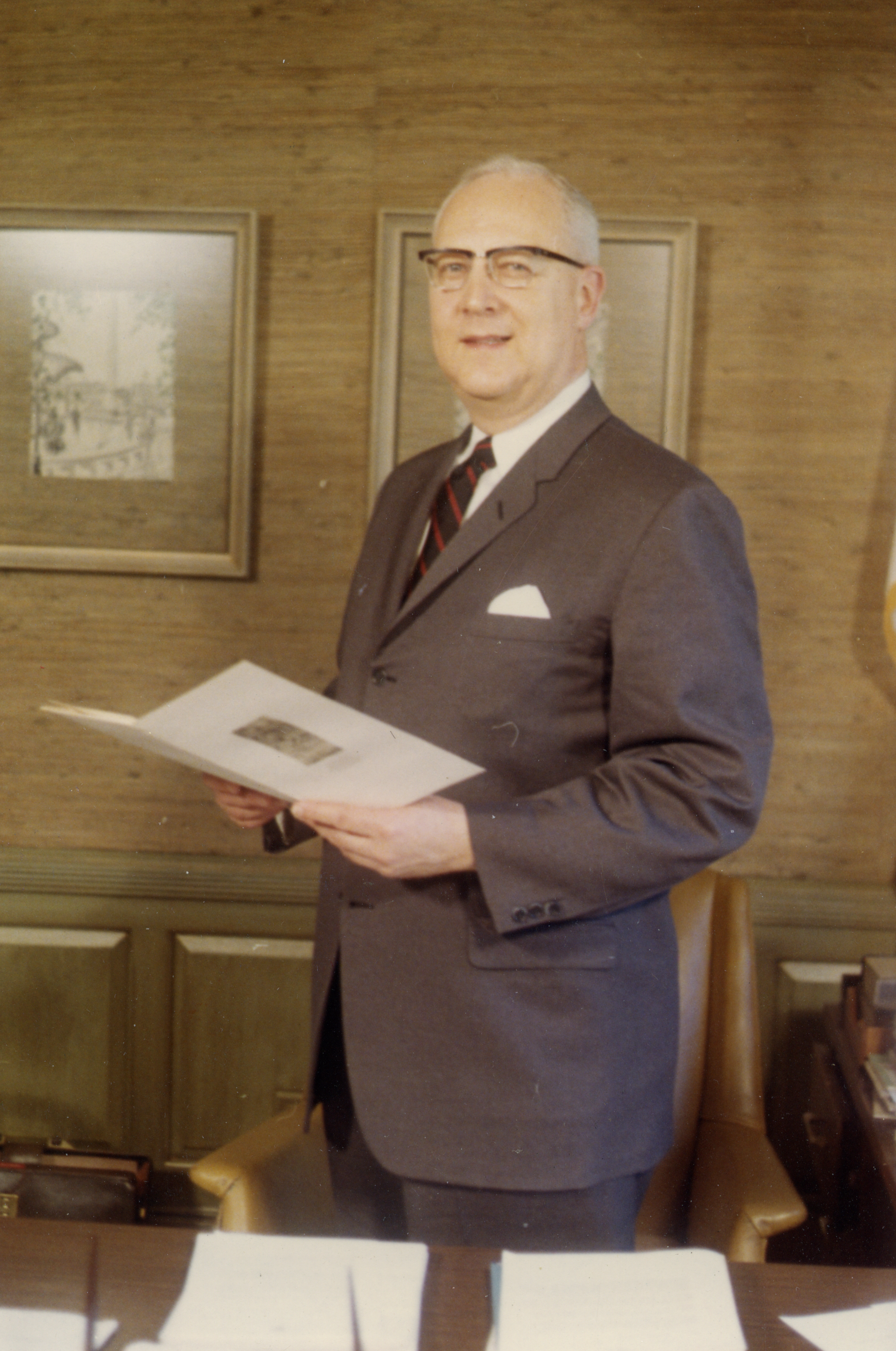

Tenth President of Illinois State University
- In office 1967–1970
- Preceded by: Robert Gehlmann Bone
- Succeeded by: David Berlo

Personal details
- Born: June 6, 1914 Hainan
- Died: August 13, 2003 (aged 89) Bloomington, Indiana

Samuel Edward Braden (1914–2003) served as the tenth president of Illinois State University in Normal, Illinois. He was recognized for his work during an incredibly tumultuous time in United States history, as life proved difficult amidst the Vietnam War. While controversial, his presidency was among several fleeting terms held by other university presidents during this time. He served at Illinois State University between 1967 and 1970, a mere three years. The average term of presidency at the university during this time was only five years, as many presidents sought to develop their professional achievements elsewhere.

== Early life ==
Samuel Edward Braden was born on June 6, 1914, to two missionary parents in Hoihow, Hainan, China. He and his family later relocated to the United States. In 1937, he married wife Beth Black, who he remained married to for the remainder of his life. The couple had four kids: Mary Beth, Stephen, John, and David Braden. His family would remain fundamental to his support system throughout his professional career.

== Education ==
After graduating high school, Braden attended the University of Oklahoma in Norman, Oklahoma, pursuing a double major in economics and political science. After graduating, he went on to pursue a PhD in economics and law at the University of Wisconsin in Madison, Wisconsin. After receiving his doctorate in 1941, Braden worked as an economist in Washington for the entirety of World War II, until he decided to serve four years in the Air Force.

== Leadership ==
Besides his time with the Air Force, Samuel Braden's work was mainly focused on education. He worked as the associate dean of the College of Arts and Sciences at Indiana University in 1954. Five years later, in 1959, he was reassigned as vice president and dean of the school's Undergraduate Development committee. This experience greatly prepared him to work in developing liberal arts colleges, where teachers were becoming increasingly qualified and further educated. After working at Indiana University, Braden decided to move to Illinois State University, where he'd later become beloved president Robert Gehlmann Bone's successor.

During Braden's first year as the tenth Illinois State University president (1967–1968), he sought to utilize the forty percent increase in funding that was granted to the school, as well as follow along the predetermined plan of previous university presidents. During his first year, the school had 850 staff members, of which a quarter had arrived around that time. With such an overwhelming staff, the school was receiving comparatively low funding against other schools, including Northern Illinois University. This was, in part, due to the ongoing unrest occurring during the Vietnam War. Education—especially at Illinois State—seemed to be on the federal back-burner. This provided Braden some difficulty with effectively expanding the university's academic capabilities. With the funding they did receive, however, Braden's presidency established new master's programs in Western European Studies, as well as Physics, Economics, Sociology, and Political Science. This allowed for a wider diversity of educational fields as more students were expected to enroll.

During Braden's presidency, Illinois State University expected anywhere from 21,000 to 28,000 new students to enroll within the coming years. This prompted a construction of several on-campus buildings to accommodate the increasing number of students. Alongside a new Psychology building (Degarmo Hall) and a new auditorium, Braden's presidency required the planning of a South Mall Art Building and a Graduate Study Center, later dubbed the Center for the Visual Arts and University Galleries, respectively. An Administrative Services Building and another service building, the Nelson-Smith building, were also commissioned as well. These structures were among many on the prospective list of university developments. To tackle all of these ideas, Braden created the University Planning Committee, a group that would track the achievements of academic and aesthetic endeavors in the coming years. The committee was also instructed to ask each academic department what developments they needed, and the manpower and resources required to obtain them. The end plan envisioned seventeen new undergraduate programs, as well as fourteen new master's and doctoral programs. By 1969, PhD programs in Geography, History, and English were approved.

Despite the progression towards an academic and structural ideal, Illinois State University faced great strife in student contentment. While previous president Robert Bone had already dropped the campus alcohol ban, students were still unhappy with the restrictive rules placed on them. In 1967, after several student protests, women's dormitories no longer held curfew. Likewise, the Student Senate had established course and teacher evaluations, where students could evaluate the quality and effectiveness of their class experience. However, some students on campus still did not feel that they had enough power over their student life. An on-campus organization against American involvement in the Vietnam War, titled Students for a Democratic Society (SDS), were restricted in their abilities to protest on-campus. They were only allowed to show films and distribute leaflets, but not much more. This was due to the overwhelming discomfort of the surrounding community. During Braden's presidency, he attempted to appeal to the community for open housing, to diminish the need for strictly on-campus living. This would lessen the blow of the incoming freshman class, which university housing may not have been able to accommodate. However, the city of Bloomington-Normal denied these requests until March 4, 1968, when referendum voters favored open housing by a small majority. While students were able to live more comfortably, these occurrences during Braden's presidency seemed to show the growing hindrance that the university was placing on the city.

Students also became increasingly discontent when it came to racial disparity on-campus during this era. On May 15, 1968, Braden appointed a Task Force on Inter-Group Relations, which had composed recommendations for improving campus diversity. Upon their suggestion, Braden had accepted forty-seven students into the university who were fit for his High Potential Students Program, an initiative which allowed students with academic troubles to be admitted into the school. By the end of the year, 300 new African-American students enrolled at ISU, two-thirds of them from the new program. Braden was confident in his ability to handle such topics in a safe, effective way. However, for the next year of his presidency (1968–1969), civil rights protests and outbreaks damaged the school's reputation with local authorities. While on-campus activist groups were taking a stand against nationwide racial injustices, a heavy weight was placed on Braden's shoulders to make decisions on adjusting racial representation. Campus' Black Student Association demanded several things from Braden, including mandatory air time on the school's radio station, as well as representation in the school newspaper. They were granted these wishes, and president Braden created an organization consisting of black students, who would determine what African-American idol the East Gate building would be renamed after. After these requests were settled, many more riots took place. Braden had, on one occasion, requested that students not leave their dormitories, for fear of being hurt in community rioting. This year, dubbed the "Year of Disruption", polarized the Illinois State University community to an extent never seen before.

Samuel E. Braden resigned from his presidency on June 12, 1969. He described his leave as "neither hasty nor capricious," and felt that he no longer wanted to grapple with the issues that faced university presidents at that time. He was more of a pacifist himself, and the violence and trouble ensuing throughout the country left him feeling incapable of serving the school further.

== Death ==
Samuel Edward Braden died August 13, 2003, at 89 years old. He died in Bloomington, Indiana, and was buried at the Indiana Veterans Memorial Cemetery in Madison.

=== Legacy ===
Samuel Braden became recognized and respected in the Illinois State University community for generations after his presidency. He was renowned for his ability to consider both sides of a situation and try to deal with concerns effectively. He endured one of the most eventful, tumultuous presidencies known to the school at that time. He faced many social and financial difficulties regarding the university, and was able to grind through them with all the vigor he could muster. In his honor, the school's Braden Auditorium was renamed after him. Today, the space is used for organization gatherings and large school events. Braden helped to carry on developmental plans established before his term, and helped the plans get translated into the hands of his successors.

Academic offices
Preceded by Robert Gehlmann Bone	President of Illinois State University; 1967–1970	Succeeded by David Berlo
