= Joy Connolly =

American scholar (born 1970)

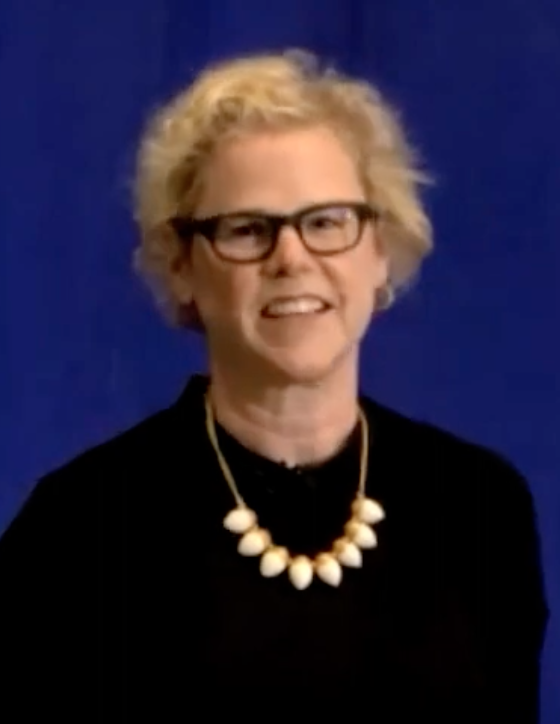
- Connolly in 2022
- Born: 1970 (age 55–56); Lowell, Massachusetts, U.S.
- Education: Princeton University (BA); University of Pennsylvania (PhD)
- Organization: American Council of Learned Societies
- Title: President, Distinguished Professor of Classics

Joy Connolly is an American scholar of classics and the president of the American Council of Learned Societies. She was previously interim president and provost of the Graduate Center of the City University of New York. She was formerly a professor of classics and the dean for humanities at New York University. Connolly's main research interests are Roman republicanism, rhetoric, civic discourse, classical reception, and the role that aesthetic experience plays in the formation of political judgement. She serves on the editorial board of the Journal of the History of Ideas.

== Early life and education ==
Connolly was born in Lowell, Massachusetts. She graduated from Middlesex School in Concord, Massachusetts, and now is a member of the school's board of trustees.

Connolly received her Bachelor of Arts degree from Princeton University in Princeton, New Jersey, 1991. In 1997, she received her PhD from the University of Pennsylvania in Philadelphia.

== Career ==
In 1997, she joined the classics faculty as assistant professor of classics at the University of Washington in Seattle. In 2000, she was hired by the classics department at Stanford University in Stanford, California, where she taught both classics and political science classes. In 2004, she joined the faculty of New York University in Manhattan, where she was subsequently promoted to associate professor in 2007 and professor in 2014. In 2016, she was named provost, senior vice president, and distinguished professor of classics at Graduate Center of the City University of New York in Manhattan.

Connolly has published two monographs on Roman rhetoric and politics. The first, The State of Speech: Rhetoric and Political Thought in Ancient Rome, was published in 2007 by Princeton University Press; the second, The Life of Roman Republicanism, also published by Princeton and appeared in 2014.

She has published articles in The Times Literary Supplement, The Nation, The Women's Review of Books, and The New York Times Book Review.

Connolly has served on the board of directors of the Society of Classical Studies and is currently a member of the Advanced Seminar in Classics and Ancient Near Eastern Studies sponsored by Venice International University.
