= Harry A. Brown =

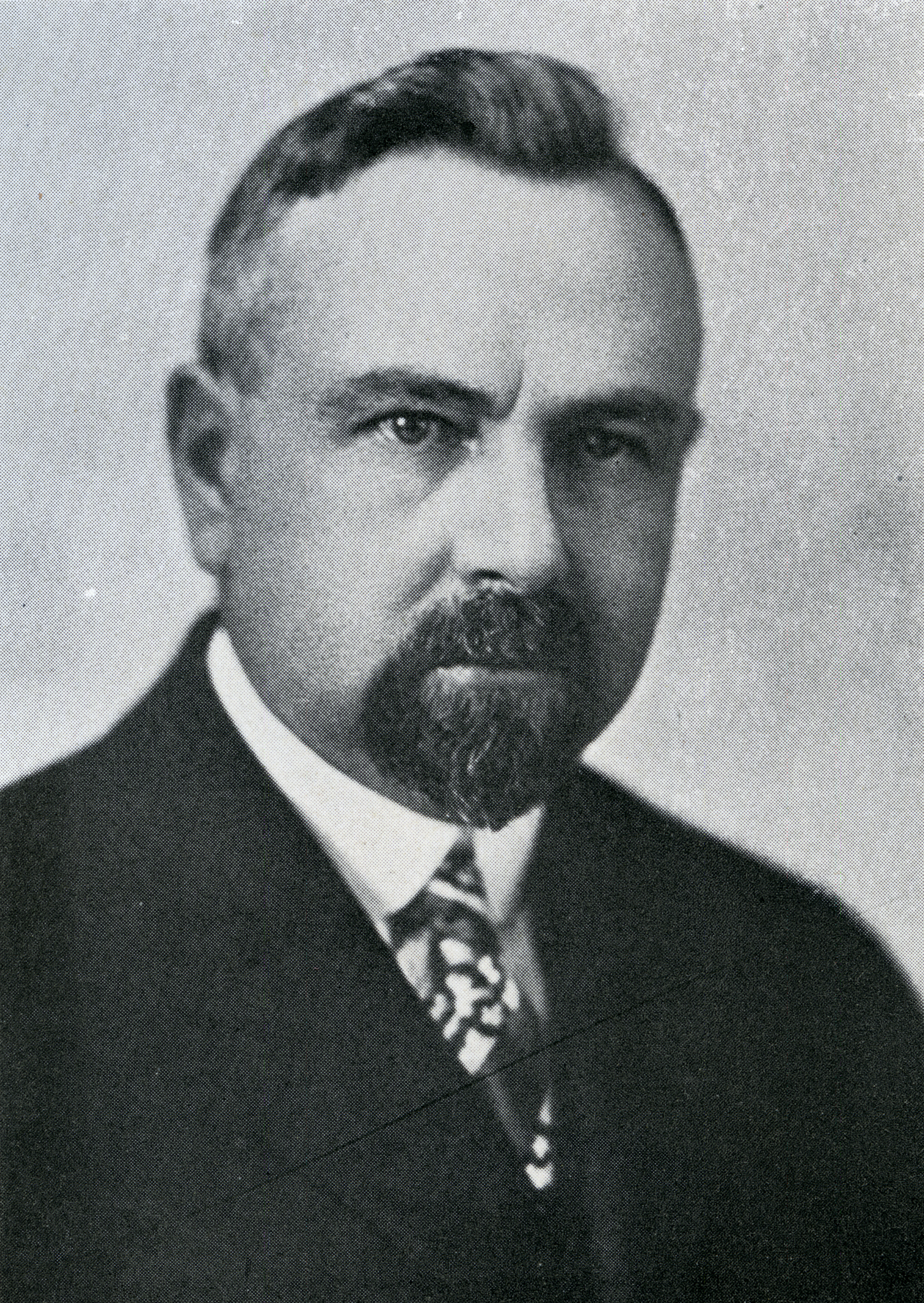

Seventh President of Illinois State University
- In office 1933–1930
- Preceded by: David Felmley
- Succeeded by: Raymond W. Fairchild

Personal details
- Born: August 19, 1879 Liberty, Maine
- Died: May 7, 1949 (aged 69)

Harry Alvin Brown (August 19, 1879 – July 5, 1949) was a college administrator and the seventh president of Illinois State Normal University in Normal, Illinois.

== Early life ==
Brown began his educational career by teaching in rural high schools while taking courses at Bates College in Lewistown, Maine. Brown earned his bachelor's degree in 1903 and went on to serve as a supervising principal and a district superintendent for schools in Maine and New Hampshire. He later earned his master's degree from the University of Colorado Boulder in 1907. Brown married Florence Marie Sever in 1908 and became the Director of the Bureau of Research of the New Hampshire Department of Public Instruction in 1913. Brown became chancellor of Oshkosh State Teacher's College in 1917, serving in that role for thirteen years until he became president of Illinois State Normal University in 1930.

== College Administrator ==
=== At Oshkosh State Teachers College ===
Brown became the fourth president of what was then known as the Oshkosh State Teachers College (or the Oshkosh Normal School) in 1917. Brown took over from the third president, John A. H. Keith, who ended his ten-year tenure by rebuilding the Normal School building after a devastating fire. Brown continued the theme of restoration and growth through World War I, establishing the Student Army Training Corps (SATC) and starting two war lectures. After the war, Brown focused on restructuring the campus's administrative functions, including implementing a letter-based grading system, institution two and three-credit-hour courses, and refining major and minor areas of study. Brown also successfully represented a bill in the Wisconsin Senate that would grant four-year teaching degrees instead of teaching certificates.

=== At Illinois State Normal University ===
Brown became the seventh president at Illinois State Normal University in 1930, succeeding the longest-serving president to date, David Felmley. Brown's tenure began with optimism and hope; he planned to bring similar administrative changes he implemented at Oshkosh to Illinois State Normal and modernize the growing school. Though Felmley successfully managed the school during difficult years, the administrative structure had become unorganized. The university dropped from the North Central Association's 'A' rating and was in danger of losing its accreditation. Brown reorganized the administrative and academic structure of the university, implementing departments (then known as 'divisions') and grouping similar courses into like areas. The reorganization also required hiring a new director of training schools and other supervisory positions. Brown's changes were not adequately discussed with faculty, causing discontent among many on staff.

Though Brown's reorganization efforts saved the university's accreditation, several Illinois State Normal University faculty members questioned Brown's administrative activities while at Oshkosh. Illinois State Normal University faculty contacted Oshkosh to inquire about course credits awarded to some of Brown's former students. The inquiry and growing debate forced Brown to resign from the presidency on June 30, 1933. Brown visited his former campus in Wisconsin the following week, bringing the documents he claimed were in question. However, the question of their validity remained, and further investigation at Oshkosh uncovered more questions. Ultimately, five faculty members were asked to resign from Oshkosh.

== Later years and death ==
After he resigned from the Illinois State Normal University presidency, Brown returned to the classroom and earned his Ph.D. in education from Columbia University. He served as the superintendent of schools in Needham, Massachusetts, before retiring from public education and working as a full-time author of educational materials. Brown died on July 5, 1949, and is buried in Needham Cemetery in Needham, Massachusetts.

== Bibliography ==
New Hampshire. Department of Public Instruction. Bureau of Research, Harry Alvin Brown, and General Education Board. The Measurement of Ability to Read: a Manual of Directions for Giving And Scoring Reading Tests And Diagnosing Class And Individual Needs. Concord, New Hampshire: The Rumford Press, 1916. https://hdl.handle.net/2027/uc1.$b73033

Brown, Harry Alvin. Study of Ability In Latin In Secondary Schools: a Description of a Method of Measuring Ability In Latin, With a Statistical Study of the Results of a Survey of Instruction In Latin In New Hampshire Secondary Schools. Oshkosh, Wisconsin: State Normal School, 1919–1920. https://hdl.handle.net/2027/uc2.ark:/13960/t1dj5g31t

Brown, Harry Alvin, 1879–1949. A Survey of Instruction In Latin In New Hampshire Secondary Schools. Oshkosh, Wisconsin: published at State normal school, 1921. https://hdl.handle.net/2027/chi.084950871

== Sources ==
Academic offices
Preceded by David Felmley	President of Illinois State University; 1930 – 1933	Succeeded by Raymond W. Fairchild
