= Robert Gehlmann Bone =

American university president (1906–1991)

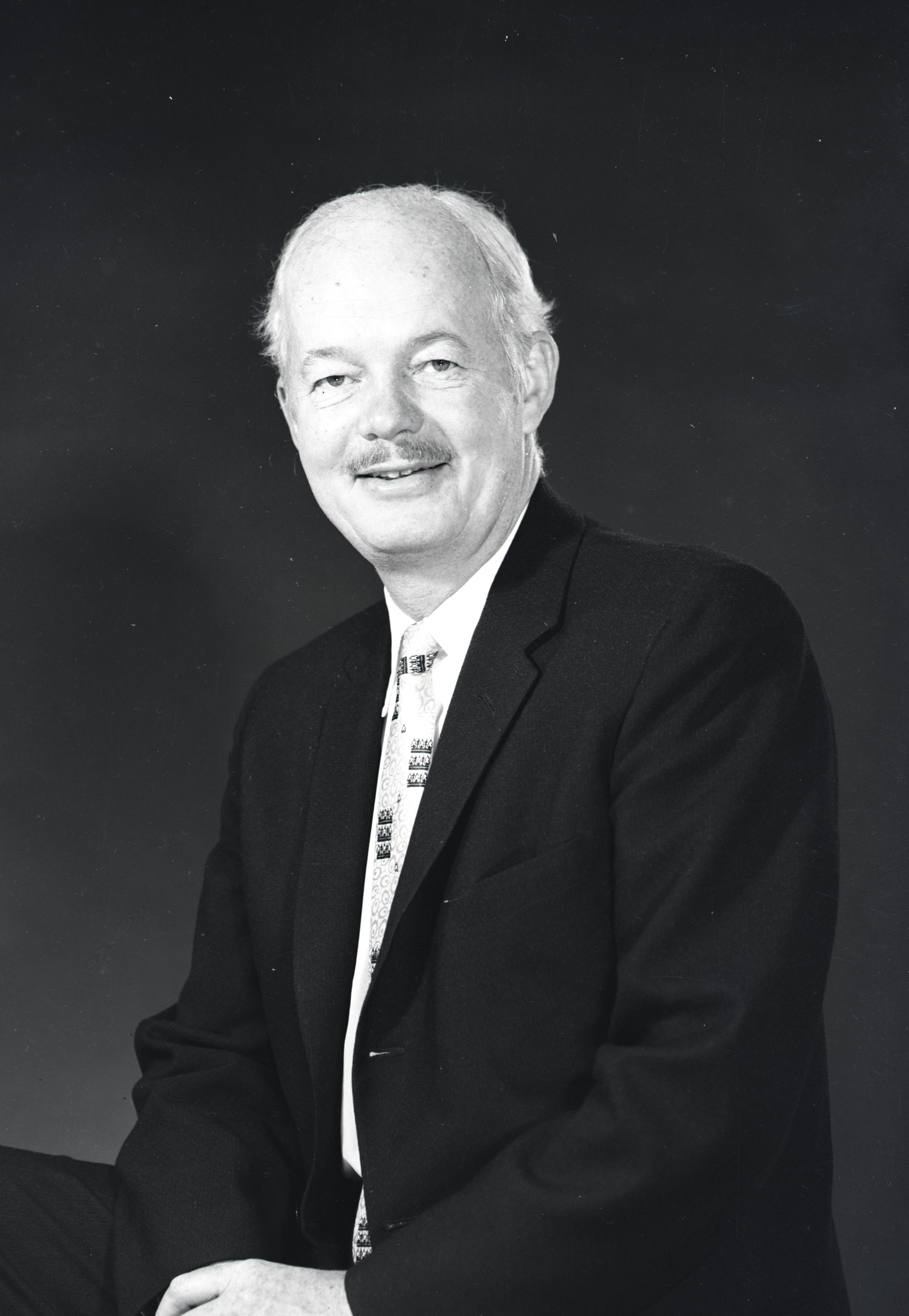

Ninth President of Illinois State University
- In office 1956–1967
- Preceded by: Raymond W. Fairchild
- Succeeded by: Samuel Braden

Personal details
- Born: June 2, 1906 Springfield, Illinois, US
- Died: January 13, 1991 (aged 84) Normal, Illinois, US

Robert Gehlmann Bone (June 2, 1906 – January 13, 1991) was the ninth president of Illinois State University in Normal, Illinois. He was renowned for his leadership experience and welcoming nature. Bone became a staple of the Illinois State University culture by representing friendliness and generosity. He is memorialized on campus through the Hand of Friendship, a small stone statue dedicated to his time at the university. During Bone's presidency, the university grew from a small teacher's college into a large multidisciplinary university. Bone was able to gain funding for the development of residence halls, thus allowing more students to attend the school. He emphasized a reconstruction of several University facilities and sought to make the campus more student-friendly. On any given day, Bone could be seen taking a walk through campus and greeting every student by name, as he sought to make Illinois State a welcoming and inclusive environment.

== Early life ==
Robert Gehlmann Bone was born in Springfield, Illinois, on June 2, 1906. His father, Eugene E. Bone, worked as a court judge in Springfield for many years. Robert Bone was educated in the public school system surrounding Springfield, completing his high school education there. The Bone family, more famously, neighbored United States' soon-to-be President, Abraham Lincoln. Robert's grandparents were familiar with the family and spent time with them during their residency in Springfield.

== Education ==
Post-high school, Bone attended the College of Wooster in Wooster, Ohio. He pursued a major in history, with a minor in political science. He graduated with honors, and later went on to pursue a Master's and PhD program at the University of Illinois Urbana-Champaign. His studies there were momentarily interrupted by his service in the Army Air Corps during World War II, but he later returned to finish his degree in 1932. During these years, he traveled the world extensively, seeing parts of Europe, North Africa, and Southwest Asia. He lived in both Egypt and France for nearly a year, and gained his first teaching experience in Alexandria, Egypt (at the American School of Alexandria). There, he taught both law and English, and eventually became director of their acting classes.

== Leadership ==
After he gained experience in Egypt (ending in 1931), Bone became a history and speech professor at Lincoln College in Lincoln, Illinois. Eventually, he became acting dean of the faculty there. In 1934, he was offered a new position at the University of Illinois, taking over for an Ancient History professor who was going on leave. This position granted him "The Gold Tablet", a prize designated to the most effective professors by University students. He remained at the University of Illinois until his leave for the army. In 1942, he was sent overseas and gained a position in the Headquarters Staff of the U.S. Forces in Europe. He eventually helped to found American University in Shrivenham, England, and became head of its History department throughout the school's existence. Upon return, he continued to work at the University of Illinois until the 1950s, and was dubbed the Director of the Division of General Studies in 1946. He was also one of five staff members designated to help counsel students when services were running low. In 1947, he was again named the Director of the Division of Special Services, but resigned from this position in 1952. He went back to his original position in general studies during that same year. During this time, he also became the acting dean of the College of Education, a stance which he held until 1953. In 1954, he became assistant provost of the university, and held on to that position for the remainder of his time.

Bone held many elected offices outside of academia. He also became active in the Student Affairs Committee, as well as the Student Senate. He became chairman of the Committee on Military Affairs, and the Senate Committee on Committees, which was elected by the University Senate. Likewise, he was elected to work on the Liberal Arts and Sciences Committee, as well as the advisory committee, at the university. Outside of these, he ran study groups for students and ran conferences on education quality.

Outside of campus, Bone was an active member of the American Historical Association and the Illinois State Historical Society. He served on the local Board of Directions for the Archaeological Institute of America. He also was highly active on the Board of several local fraternities, while also serving for the local YMCA.

=== Illinois State Normal University ===
Robert Gehlmann Bone became the ninth president of Illinois State Normal University (now Illinois State University). He was inaugurated in 1956 and served until 1967. During his time at Illinois State, he was responsible for much of the construction done to revamp all ends of campus. His presidency initiated the expansion of the South campus to include Tri-Towers residential halls, Hamilton-Whitten and Atkin-Colby buildings, and a new and improved Cardinal Court residential complex. Likewise, the Hancock Stadium and Horton Field House were expanded. These structures were initially going to be deconstructed, but instead were revamped to make use of existing parking lots, as well as to accommodate the growing University population. The development of these new buildings provided students with more housing and accessibility to the central area of campus. The construction of more housing allowed expansion of the University's enrollment, an initiative attempted by many other presidents to follow.

During previous president Raymond W. Fairchild's term, a new art building was in the making. However, it was not completely planned or finished until Bone's presidency. The new structure was to house the theater, speech, and music departments. It would consist of two separate buildings conjoined by an atrium: Centennial East, and Centennial West. Three different performance centers were constructed inside these buildings, for performances and practices.

Bone also worked to change the school's name from Illinois State Normal University to just Illinois State University, as it is commonly known today. This occurred on January 1, 1967, after a trial run with the moniker Illinois State University at Normal. This name change coincided with the reorganization of academic departments in 1966. The University adopted the College of Education, the College of Arts and Sciences, and the College of Applied Science and Technology, a stark contrast from its prior department-based structure.

=== Death ===
Robert Gehlmann Bone died on January 13, 1991, at 84 years old, at his home in Normal.

== Legacy ==
=== Hand of Friendship ===
The Hand of Friendship is a commemorative statue donated to Robert Bone by the Illinois State University class of 1967. This was shortly after his resignation that same year. The Hand of Friendship was meant to represent the selfless nature of Bone's presidency, and his tendency to act for the greater good of the academic community. The statue still stands today on Illinois State University's main campus.

=== Bone Student Center ===
The Bone Student Center (originally the University Union) is an on-campus communal space that was renamed to honor Bone in 1982, at the University's 125th anniversary ceremony. The space is still used today by students, and offers a variety of study spaces, dining options, and other scholastic resources.

== Sources ==
Academic offices
Preceded by Raymond W. Fairchild	President of Illinois State University; 1956–1967	Succeeded by Samuel Braden
