= Orville Gilbert Brim Jr. =

Orville Gilbert Brim Jr. (April 7, 1923 – April 15, 2016) was an American social psychologist who conducted research on early childhood and middle age. He was the author of books exploring ambition and the nature of and the desire for fame.

== Biography ==
Orville Gilbert Brim Jr. was born in Elmira, New York and grew up in Columbus, Ohio where his father was a professor at Ohio State University. He was introduced to sociology as a freshman at Yale in the autumn of 1941 and had chosen it as his major field of study when he was called up for officer training in the Army Air Corps. Commissioned a second lieutenant, he spent the remainder of World War II on combat duty in the Pacific theater as a pilot of B-24 bombers.

After his discharge, Brim returned to Yale, earning his B.A. degree in 1947 and his Ph.D. in sociology in 1951. After a year as a research assistant he joined the faculty of the University of Wisconsin as an instructor and subsequently assistant professor before moving to the Russell Sage Foundation.

During a two-week leave from the Army Air Corps in 1944, Lieutenant Brim was introduced to Kathleen Jane Vigneron. Soon after his leave was up the two were married—a union that lasted almost 60 years and produced four children (John Gilbert, Scott Whittier, Margaret Lowry and Sarah Morgan).

In 1985, the Brims settled in Vero Beach, Florida, spending their summers at Watch Hill, Rhode Island, and later, Old Greenwich, Connecticut. Kathleen Brim died in 2003.

== Work ==
Brim joined the Russell Sage Foundation of New York City in 1955 and was named president in 1964. He led the foundation's successful effort to encourage the law schools at leading universities to include courses in social science research in their curricula—for example, by accompanying courses in criminal law with courses in crime and its origins. The concept was later extended to schools of medicine and journalism.

In 1974, Brim was appointed president of the Foundation for Child Development. During his twelve-year tenure he expanded the foundation's field of inquiry and support, which had been centered on welfare programs for children, to include study of their social and psychological development. Under his leadership, the first National Survey of Children was undertaken, in 1976, and three years later he established through the foundation a new, not-for-profit organization, Child Trends, in Washington, D.C.

After leaving the Foundation for Child Development in 1985, Brim wrote the first of his two books exploring widely known but little-studied aspects of human behavior. Ambition: How We Manage Success and Failure Throughout Our Lives, was published in 1992. It has since been reprinted and translated into several languages.

His second book, Look at Me!: The Fame Motive from Childhood to Death, examines the desire to be famous in people of different ages, backgrounds and social status, and how succeeding or failing to achieve fame affected their lives, both outwardly and inwardly. It was published in 2009.

In 1989, The John D. and Catherine T. MacArthur Foundation asked Dr. Brim to lead the Foundation's Research Network on Successful Midlife Development, which to this day remains the most thorough and extensive examination of middle age ever carried out. Over the next ten years, the Network conducted dozens of separate studies of midlife drawn from interviews of more than 7,000 Americans of both sexes, aged 25 to 74. The basic findings, which received nationwide attention when announced in early 1999, were that Americans tend to feel younger than they really are; that, for most, "midlife crisis" is a myth, and midlife itself—especially the years 40 to 60—is a time of good health, psychic equanimity, productive activity and satisfying personal and community relationships. In summarizing the findings, Brim declared, "On balance, the sense we all have is that midlife is the best place to be." The complete findings of the MacArthur project appeared in 2004 in How Healthy Are We" A National Study of Well-Being at Midlife, a book edited by Dr. Brim with Carol D. Ryff and Ronald C. Kessler. A follow-up study of the original 7,000 respondents to the original network survey is currently in progress at the University of Wisconsin.

== Awards ==
- Society for the Study of Human Development Award for Distinguished Career Contributions to the Scientific Study of Life Span Development, 2005.
- Society for Research in Child Development Award for Distinguished Scientific Contributions to Child Development Research, 1985.
- Kurt Lewin Memorial Award. Society for the Psychological Study of Social Issues, 1979.
- Wilbur Lucius Cross Medal of the Yale Graduate School Association, 1975.

== Publications ==
- Look At Me!: The Fame Motive from Childhood to Old Age. Ann Arbor: University of Michigan Press, 2009.
- How Healthy are We?: A National Study of Well Being at Midlife (with Carol D. Ryff, Ronald C. Kessler, Editors). Chicago, Illinois: University of Chicago Press, 2004.
- Ambition: How We Manage Success and Failure Throughout Our Lives. New York: Basic Books, 1992. Reprinted, Nebraska: iUniverse, 2000. Swedish version: Ambition - hur vi klarar framgång och misslyckande i livet. Malmo, Sweden: Brain Books, 1994. Italian version: Come Gestire Gli Alti ei Bssi Nella Vita E Nel Lavoro. Milano, Italy: RCS Libri & Grandi Opere S.p.A., 1995. Spanish version: Ambiciones Legitimas, Cómo manejar el éxito y el fracaso a lo largo de nuestra vida. Buenos Aires: Sudamericana, 1997.
- Life-Span Development and Behavior, Volumes II VI (with Paul B. Baltes, Editors). New York: Academic Press, 1979 1984.
- Learning to Be Parents: Principles, Programs and Methods (with David Harman). Beverly Hills: Sage Publications, 1980.
- Constancy and Change in Human Development (with Jerome Kagan, Editors). Cambridge: Harvard University Press, 1980.
- The Dying Patient (with Howard E. Freeman, Sol Levine and Norman Scotch). New York: Russell Sage Foundation, 1970.
- American Beliefs and Attitudes about Intelligence (with David C. Glass, John Neulinger and Ira J. Firestone). New York: Russell Sage Foundation, 1969.
- Experience and Attitudes of American Adults Concerning Standardized Intelligence Tests, Technical Report #1 on the Social Consequences of Ability Testing (with John Neulinger and David C. Glass). New York: Russell Sage Foundation, 1965.
- The Use of Standardized Ability Tests in American Secondary Schools and Their Impact on Students, Teachers, and Administrators, Technical Report #3 on the Social Consequences of Ability Testing (with David A. Goslin, David C. Glass, and Isadore Goldberg). New York: Russell Sage Foundation, 1965.
- Intelligence: Perspectives 1965 (with Richard S. Crutchfield and Wayne H. Holtzman). New York: Harcourt, Brace & World, Inc., 1966.
- Socialization After Childhood: Two Essays (with Stanton Wheeler). New York: John Wiley & Sons, 1966. German edition: Erwachsenen-Sozialisation, Sozialisation nach Abschluss der Kindheit (with Stanton Wheeler). Stuttgart: Ferdinand Enke Verlag,1974.
- Personality and Decision Processes: Studies in the Social Psychology of Thinking (with David C. Glass, David E. Lavin, and Norman Goodman). Stanford: Stanford University Press, 1962. Reissued 1978.
- Education for Child Rearing. New York: Russell Sage Foundation, 1959. Paperback edition, Basic Books, 1965.
- Sociology and the Field of Education. New York: Russell Sage Foundation, 1958. German edition: Soziologie des Erziehungswesens, Heidelberg: Quelle & Meyer, 1963.
