= Margaret Lemos =

American legal scholar

Academic background
- Education: Brown University; New York University School of Law

Academic work
- Institutions: Duke University School of Law

Margaret H. Lemos is an American legal scholar of constitutional law, legal institutions, and procedure. She is currently Robert G. Seaks Distinguished Professor of Law at Duke University School of Law, where she has taught since 2011.

== Education and career ==
Lemos completed a Bachelor of Arts degree in political science at Brown University in 1997. She graduated from the New York University School of Law in 2001. Lemos clerked for Kermit V. Lipez and John Paul Stevens, held fellowships at New York University and the Office of the Solicitor General before beginning her teaching career at the Benjamin N. Cardozo School of Law.

In 2011, she joined the Duke University School of Law faculty. In fall 2014, she served as Anne Urowsky Visiting Professor of Law at Yale Law School. Lemos was appointed the Robert G. Seaks Distinguished Professor of Law in 2015.

In 2021, Lemos served on Joe Biden's Presidential Commission on the Supreme Court of the United States.
