= David Berlo =

American communications theorist

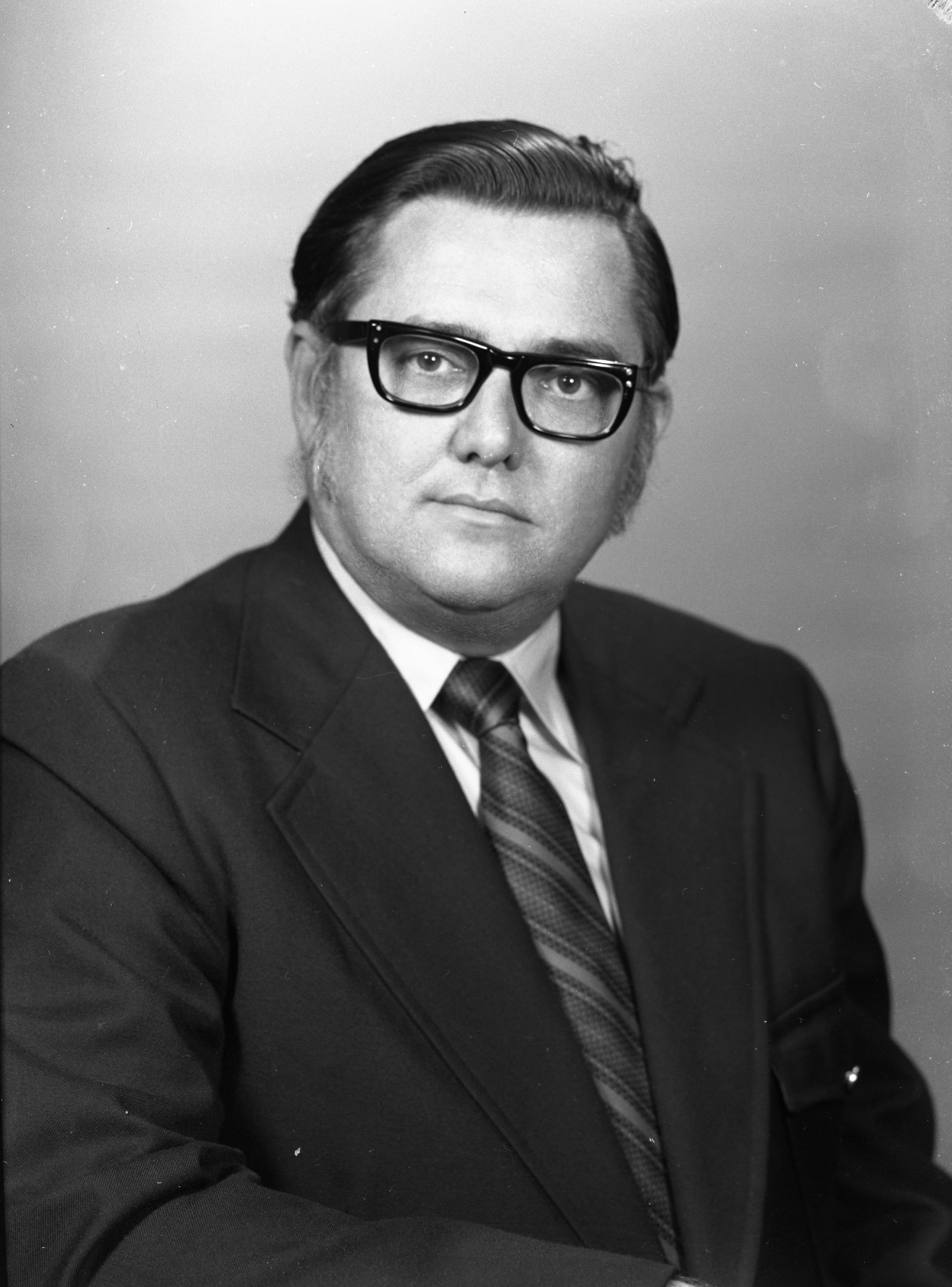

Eleventh President of Illinois State University
- In office 1970–1973
- Preceded by: Samuel Braden
- Succeeded by: Gene Budig

Personal details
- Born: 1929 St. Louis, Missouri
- Died: February 23, 1996 (aged 66–67) Chicago, Illinois

David Kenneth Berlo (1929 – February 23, 1996) was an American communications theorist. He taught at Michigan State University and later served as president of Illinois State University.

== Early life and career ==
He was raised in St. Louis, Missouri, and studied psychology at the University of Illinois at Urbana–Champaign. Berlo remained at UIUC to pursue his doctorate in communications under Wilbur Schramm. While at the University of Illinois, he wrote a communications textbook titled The Process of Communication, which is still used today. Berlo was founding chairman of the Faculty of Communication at Michigan State University, serving from 1958 to 1971.

In 1960, Berlo expanded the linear transmission model with the sender-message-channel-receiver (SMCR) model of communication. Later, Wilbur Schramm introduced a model that identified multiple variables in communication which includes the transmitter, encoding, media, decoding, and receiver.

In Berlo's SMCR model, the sender is one who sends the message, the receiver receives the message, which is transmitted through the channel where disturbances might occur.

The components of Berlo's SMCR Model consist of the following: communication skills, attitude, knowledge, and social systems. In this model, the use of communication skills is applied to his theory for the source to communicate effectively he/she needs to have good communication skills. Communication skills should include listening, speaking, reading, and writing. It is important to know how to effectively communicate to apply this model. The use of attitude is put in place so that the source has the attitude to communicate effectively. The use of knowledge is important to know what is trying to be communicated so that the source knows to be knowledgeable about the information that it wants to send. Lastly, social systems are put in place so that communication takes place in a society where there are different people with different beliefs and values. The source needs to be aware of the culture, religion, beliefs, and values of the receiver.

An SMCR model can be applied in many different fields. A recent study discovered the correlation between English and Chinese students and their effective use of the English language. By using the SMCR model, aims to explore problems faced by English teachers in ‘role’ transformation from the traditional classroom to the flipped classroom, propose how they should transform their roles to improve the teaching quality and discuss this impact on traditional English classroom. This is an effective way that Berlo's SMCR model can be applied to a real-world scenario in communication studies.

== Time at Illinois State University ==
He assumed the presidency at Illinois State University in 1971. Berlo had high hopes for ISU, wanting it to become the premier undergraduate university in the state. One way Berlo did this was to have each academic department meet and decide where they could cut costs in order to reallocate funding. The cuts were seen in the elimination of academic programs and majors such as the Master's in Physics and the Home Economics Teacher Education major, along with a reduction in admission to certain programs. Some controversial suggestions from Berlo were an added fee for on-campus health services and a family planning center. He also wanted to change the entire administrative structure of the university, which was met with heavy resistance from the Academic Senate of the university.

One defining feature of Berlo's presidency was the low morale seen among both faculty members and university students. His changing of faculty salaries without the concurrence of the faculty Academic Senate members and the centralization of governance at the university contributed to this. Berlo's actions regarding who made decisions and the amount of power held by the Academic Senate, faculty members, and students who had been fighting for more power on campus upset all of these groups, and made them feel as if Berlo was ignoring the ISU Constitution and the Academic Senate (Champagne 99).

One notable part of Berlo's time in office at ISU was the career of Doug Collins, a notable basketball player who went on to both play and coach in the NBA, along with play in the 1972 Munich Summer Olympics.

=== Presidential Residence Controversy ===
During Berlo's time as president, the Board of Regents governing the university decided that the president should live in a residence provided by the university, and the cost of construction would become a point of contention. It was discovered that the charges told to the Board were not entirely correct, and the building of the residence was much more expensive than previously estimated or approved. An independent audit found that the house cost over $80,000 over its approved budget, and since he was the president of the university, Berlo ultimately took the fall for this. There were also other costs from Berlo that were criticized, such as his food arrangement with a dining center and his liquor bills, which were mildly controversial due to Normal being a dry town.

Berlo resigned as president of ISU on May 30, 1973.

== Later Years and Death ==
Berlo moved to St. Petersburg, Florida after resigning from the ISU presidency, where he worked for the Industrial Council of the YMCA. He died at the age of 66 on February 23, 1996, and was buried in the New Saint Marcus Cemetery and Mausoleum in Affton, Missouri.

Academic offices
Preceded by Samuel Braden	President of Illinois State University; 1971 – 1973	Succeeded by Gene Budig
