= Angeline Vernon Milner =

American librarian

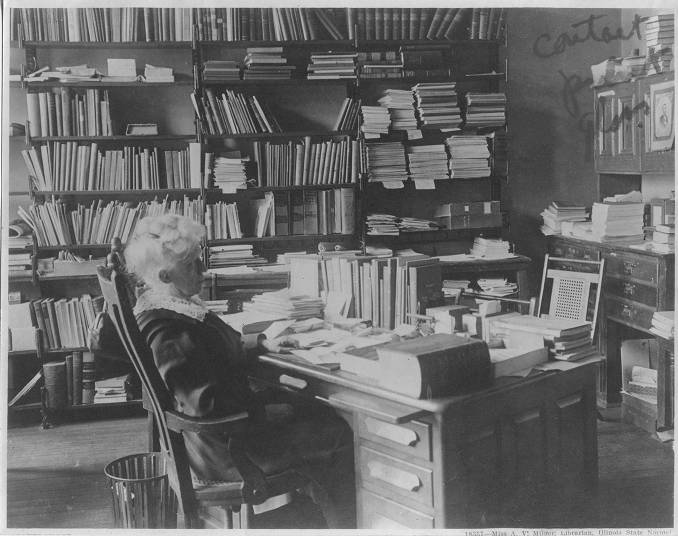
- Born: April 9, 1856; Bloomington, Illinois, US
- Died: January 13, 1928 (aged 71); Normal, Illinois, US
- Resting place: Evergreen Cemetery, Bloomington, Illinois
- Occupation: Librarian
- Employer: Illinois State Normal University
- Organization: Illinois Natural History Society
- Board member of: Illinois Library Association

Angeline ("Ange") Vernon Milner (April 9, 1856 – January 13, 1928) was the first full-time librarian hired at Illinois State Normal University. She was also an author and a founding member of the Illinois Library Association.

== Early life ==
Angeline "Ange" Vernon Milner was born in Bloomington, Illinois on April 9, 1856. Her parents were John Vernon Milner and Angeline Baker Milner. She was the oldest of six children. Given her mother, Angeline's, experience as a governess in Boston, she viewed public school as insufficient, and thus educated Ange at home. She taught her the alphabet by age two and had her reading at age four. Ange would read to her younger siblings every Sunday. Her father claimed she had her own form of pronunciation. Her mother exposed her to books on literature, art, and history, which ignited such interests within her and influenced her throughout her life. Ange eventually transitioned to private school when she was eleven and attended public high school at Bloomington High School. She also attended the Elementary Department of the Major's College located in northern Bloomington for two years during her period of schooling. However, she never graduated from either institution as she had to leave due to ill health.

Her poor health led her to take pauses in her education. During one of these pauses, she spent time with her aunt in Brookline, Massachusetts for a year. After this, she returned to high school only taking a few courses, but still did not complete her time there. Once she officially left Bloomington High School, she took private lessons in German and French.

Ange attended summer biology courses at Illinois State Normal University in 1875 and 1878. This excited her interest in science, especially with the scientific movement following the Civil War. She was able to take these classes because of family connections with the locally known Fell family as well as Stephen Forbes, who headed the Illinois Natural History Society in town. Forbes also tasked Ange with the upkeep of plants for the museum, and once she finished, she wanted to perform other tasks of interest. Hence, she began cataloging books for him, using Public Libraries in the United States of America by the Bureau of Education as her guide. This book influenced her to pursue library science.

Once again attributed to her ill health, Ange had to take a break from working and visited her relatives in St. Paul, Minnesota in 1884. This stay only lasted several months, and shortly after arriving home she was confronted with her gravely ill mother. Thus, she became a head nurse for a few years to help take care of her.

In Ange's free time, she was also an honorary member of Bloomington's History and Art Club and an active member of Mrs. Humphrey's Palladian club. The History and Art Club derived from the Palladian club as the latter could not contain its increasing membership. In the 1870s, Ange created her own club dedicated to American literature studies.

== Career ==
Forbes and Miss Fannie Fell, who was a faculty member herself, recommended Ange to President Edwin Hewett of Illinois State Normal University (ISNU - now Illinois State University) when he was in search of a university librarian, based on her experience with the Natural History Society's library, as well as the time she spent with Hannah R. Galliner at Bloomington Public Library. Previously, the Board of Education had not approved of a university librarian, but they finally did in Fall 1889 as two literary societies offered their stock to the school. In 1890, she was hired, and began cataloging thousands of books among the five campus libraries. Hewett's goal was to combine the various libraries into one.

Once this task was completed, the Board was pleasantly surprised at her success. Ange was then hired as a full-time staff member. Upon her employment with the university, she wanted to make the library's resources as accessible as possible to students. She intensely studied the Library Journal to learn best practices and attended meetings with other established librarians. One such attendee was William F. Poole, for instance.

One way in which Ange made library resources more accessible was through her Dewey-Decimal card catalog, as opposed to the previously handwritten documentations. She also implemented new article indexes to replace the old annotated bibliographies. To put sources like these to use, she instructed students on how to navigate and effectively take advantage of the library through learning experiences beginning in 1892. These experiences eventually turned into a ten-lesson course that was required for every student to take, being the first of its kind at ISNU. Katharine L. Sharp, who was another renowned librarian at the University of Illinois, regarded Ange's class as "the strongest continuous influence [that] has been exerted in the state of Illinois."

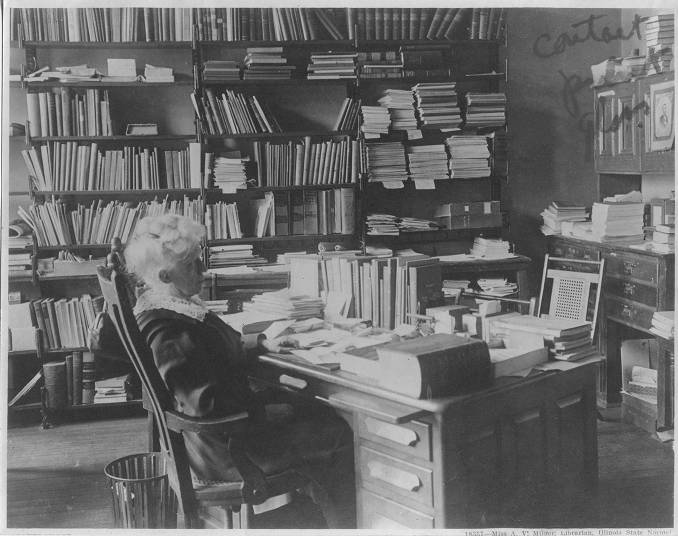
Ange in her office, undated

Ange maintained an honorable reputation throughout her career. Her skill was so widely recognized and understood that there was an article in The Vidette describing the library's organization as "perfect," followed by characterizing Ange as "the most obliging person in the state." She also published many works in her field to help educators create small yet impactful libraries in their schools and rural areas, which became recommended readings throughout the country.

Ange also joined the American Library Association (ALA) and National Education Association to uphold ISNU library's credibility and her own. This led her to help establish the Illinois Library Association branch of the ALA, in which she was elected as its president, vice president, secretary, and councilor. Her presidential election was not smooth, as originally it was given to a man despite advocacy for Ange to hold the position. However, he resigned, so Ange became acting president, and was eventually promoted to president after she successfully arranged a conference.

On top of Ange's professional development, she was warmly regarded by students and faculty at ISNU. For instance, she was called "Aunt Ange," as students felt comfortable approaching her for academic help and on a social level. It was her aim to make the library a social environment and she consistently advocated for its improvement. She wanted to create comfortable and expansive spaces. Ange regularly hosted open houses for people to come in and view the library and she collaborated with students on instruction programs and exhibits to assure their perspective was represented. She also invited students to her home to socialize and provide meals to them. Both the library and her house were venues for large gatherings, hosted by herself.

It was noted that Ange did not wait for students to approach her for help; rather, she took it upon herself to study the numerous courses offered by the university and thus created her own reference sheets and other materials that would help them, should they need it. So, whenever a student came to her, she had resources prepared ahead of time.

Ange was involved with students in their extracurriculars as well. For instance, she wrote on the Sapphonian Society in The Vidette and was recognized by the group for her contributions. A fellow club member of note was June Rose Colby.

Another way Ange connected with students beyond academia was in her establishment of a letter-writing campaign to students, alumni, and faculty serving in World War I. She personally composed over six hundred letters to those stationed both within the United States and overseas. During the war, she was also chosen to join the university's War Service Committee, for which she put together a permanent War Roster file with the help of campus inhabitants. The Illinois State Historical Library later declared that ISNU's War Roster was one of the most thorough in the state, which was a success for Ange as she aimed to preserve the soldiers' legacy. This carried on after the war, as she mailed surveys to every veteran she could track down from the school. Ultimately, she was able to preserve records for 806 people, of which 685 remain today.

== Legacy and death ==
Ange died on January 13, 1928, in Normal, Illinois from a long-term illness. She had retired from the university the year before due to her decline in health. Since around 1900, she had developed increasing deafness. She is buried at Evergreen Memorial Cemetery in Bloomington, Illinois.

Illinois State University's Milner Library was named to honor her legacy in 1940. Originally located at what is now Williams Hall, the current library was built in 1976.

Throughout her career, her primary accomplishments included: "transforming several thousand books into a systematically arranged collection totaling more than 40,000 volumes," her highly regarded library instruction program, serving the library profession on a national and regional level, creating more than eighty of her own publishings, and all while keeping positive relations with her students and faculty.

== Bibliography ==
- Milner, Angeline Vernon (1911). "School Libraries Notes and Suggestions: The Teacher's Vacation". The School News and Practical Educator. 24: 496–497. Wikidata Q124767630.
