= Zella Allen Dixson =

American author, lecturer, librarian, and publisher

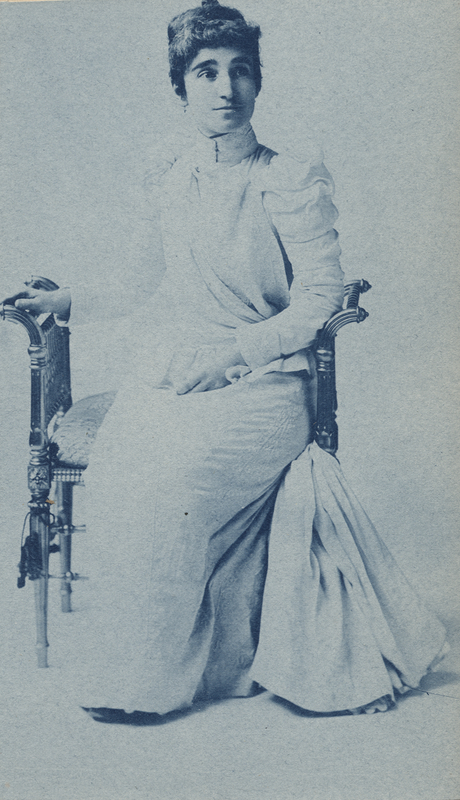
- Zella Allen Dixson
- Born: Zella Allen; August 10, 1858; Zanesville, Ohio, U.S.
- Died: January 12, 1924 (aged 65); Chicago, Illinois, U.S.
- Education: Mount Holyoke College

Zella Allen Dixson (August 10, 1858 – January 12, 1924) was an American writer, lecturer, librarian, and publisher. She was the longest-serving director and associate librarian of the University of Chicago Extension Division's library school.

== Early life ==
Zella Allen was born on August 10, 1858, in Zanesville, Ohio, to Josiah Buffet Allen and Mary Caroline Blandy Allen. In 1880, she graduated from Mount Holyoke College. She married Joseph Ehrman Dixson in 1881 and was soon after widowed in 1885. She began working as an assistant to Melvil Dewey at Columbia College library not long after her husband's death and was one of Dewey's students in library science.

== Career ==
In 1886, Dixson traveled around the Midwest, organizing over thirty libraries including those of Denison University, Kenyon College, and Baptist Union Theological Seminary. She also organized the public libraries of Elyria, Ohio; La Crosse, Wisconsin; and Duluth, Minnesota. That same year, she joined the American Library Association.

From 1888 to 1890, Dixson worked as the librarian of Denison University. From there, she went on to the Baptist Union Theological Seminary. In 1892, the Seminary became the Divinity School at the University of Chicago and Dixson was appointed assistant librarian. While working there, she earned her MA from Shephardson College for Women and would later earn her AM from Denison University in 1902. In 1895, she was promoted to associate librarian. During her career, she made three trips to Europe to study the handling of rare books.

Dixson went on to become the associate librarian, instructor, and director of the library school at the University of Chicago Extension Division—a program originally designed to teach the public how to use libraries. University President William Rainey Harper had initially asked Melvil Dewey to take the position, but Dewey turned it down. By 1900, Dixson had expanded the library school into a program that provided professional training for librarians.

=== Feud with Melvil Dewey and Katharine Sharp ===
In 1900, Melvil Dewey wrote a letter to the president of the University of Chicago, William Rainey Harper, stating that Dixson was incompetent as a librarian and as the program director of the library school. He also accused her of falsely claiming to be a graduate of the New York State Library School. Dixson responded by stating that she never claimed to have attended New York State Library School and that Dewey was only criticizing her work with the Extension Division because of the competition her program created with Katharine Sharp's library school at the University of Illinois in Urbana. She pointed out the many esteemed library positions held by her program's graduates, and also defended herself by presenting copies of letters and addresses Dewey wrote in which he praised Dixson as one of his best students. Dixson concluded her letter to Harper by stating:

I have long held the opinion that Mr. Dewey is crazy, a statement often heard in library circles and the most Christian explanation I can cherish of his actions for more than a decade.

The students, graduates, and employers of those who were enrolled in the Extension Division's library school also wrote to Harper defending both the program and Dixson's competence. University library cataloger and instructor Josephine Robertson even stated her belief that Dewey was bitter over Dixson's creation and use of a different classification system than the one he devised.

In 1902, Harper received a letter from the ALA's College and Reference Library Section criticizing the Extension Division's program and Dixson. Dixson responded by stating that each of their criticisms was false and accused Katharine Sharp and Melvil Dewey, who was a member of the ALA's College Section, of conspiring against her library school. She also warned Harper that, if he decided to close down the school, it would cost the university thousands of dollars in returned tuition and cause the library to lose its student workers.

In July 1903, the ALA's Committee on Library Training, of which Katharine Sharp was a member, released a report on the Extension Division's school, criticizing it for not having stricter admissions requirements and for not requiring students to complete the full program before receiving a certificate. In October of that year, the library school was shut down with much protest from the students and the faculty.

== Later life ==
After the library school at the University of Chicago Extension Division closed, Dixson remained as the university's associate librarian. In 1906, she was given an honorary Doctorate of Humane Letters by Shurtleff College, which is now part of Southern Illinois University. She retired from the University of Chicago in 1910 to spend more time working on her literary projects and the Wisteria Cottage Press, which she owned and operated. She remained active in the Chicago Woman's Club and the Chicago Political Equality League through 1914. Dixson died on January 12, 1924, in Chicago.

== Professional associations & clubs ==
Dixson joined the American Library Association, the Illinois Library Association, and the Chicago Library Club in 1886. She was a member of the Chicago Woman's Club and president of the Mt. Holyoke Association of the Northwest as well as a member of the Chicago Political Equality League, the Travelers' Club, and the Authors League of America. In 1893, she was appointed to the Woman's Advisory Council on a Congress of Librarians and was a member of both the Advisory Council of the Woman's Branch of the Worlds' Congress Auxiliary and the Committee on Literature Sub-Congress on Libraries.

Dixson belonged to several clubs in Europe as well, most of them focusing on bookplates (also known as "ex-libris"). She was a member of the Ex Libris Society of London, Exlibris Verein zu Berlin (Ex-Libris Association of Berlin), Österreichische Ex-Libris-Gesellschaft (Austrian Ex-Libris Society) in Vienna, Société Française des Collectionneurs d'Ex-Libris (French Society of Ex-Libris Collectors) in Paris, and the Ex-Libris Club in Basel.

== Published works ==
In 1894, Dixson's work Library Science was published. Her works Cataloger's Manual of Authors' Names and Comprehensive Subject Index to Universal Prose Fiction were published in 1895 and 1896 respectively. Dixson was also an avid collector of bookplates and, in 1902, published a collection called Children's book-plates. She followed it up in 1903 with Concerning book-plates: a handbook for collectors.
