= Midwest Independent Conference =

- Association: NCAA
- Founded: 1991
- Sports fielded: 1; women's: 1
- Division: NC
- No. of teams: 4
- Headquarters: Chicago, Illinois
- Region: Midwest & South U.S.

The Midwest Independent Conference (MIC) is a National Collegiate Athletic Association (NCAA) Division I, II and III women's gymnastics conference. The MIC was established in 1991 for schools that sponsor women's gymnastics teams, but do not have women's gymnastics as a sponsored sport in their primary conferences. The NCAA championships in women's gymnastics is a non-divisional championship; meaning athletes or teams from any division can qualify.

== Members ==
Institution	Location	Founded	Enrollment	Division	Joined	Nickname	Primary Conference
Centenary College of Louisiana	Shreveport, Louisiana	1825	650	III	2001	Ladies	Southern Collegiate Athletic Conference (Division III)
Illinois State University	Normal, Illinois	1857	20,500	I	1991	Redbirds	Missouri Valley Conference
Southeast Missouri State University	Cape Girardeau, Missouri	1873	10,400	I	1991	Redhawks	Ohio Valley Conference
Texas Woman's University	Denton, Texas	1901	14,200	II	2002 or 2003	Pioneers	Lone Star Conference (Division II)

== Former members ==
Institution	Nickname	Location	Division	Joined	Last Year	Current Conference
Lindenwood University	Lions	St. Charles, Missouri	I	2012	2024	Program eliminated after 2024 season
Northern Illinois University	Huskies	DeKalb, Illinois	I	1991 or 1992	1997	Mid-American Conference
University of Illinois at Chicago	Flames	Chicago, Illinois	I	1991	2019	Program eliminated after 2019 season
Winona State University	Warriors	Winona, Minnesota	II		2003	Wisconsin Intercollegiate Athletic Conference

== Conference champions ==
Sources: UIC Women's gymnastics archives , Google MIC website

Year	Champion	Score	Host
2026	Southeast Missouri	194.950	Illinois State
2025	Illinois State	196.025	Centenary
2024	Lindenwood	196.075	Lindenwood
2023	Illinois State	196.375	Southeast Missouri
2022	Texas Woman's	195.750	Texas Woman's
2021	Lindenwood	195.575	Illinois State
2020	Lindenwood*		
2019	Illinois Chicago (tie)	195.350	Centenary
2019	Lindenwood (tie)	195.350	Centenary
2018	Lindenwood	195.225	Lindenwood
2017	Lindenwood	194.675	Illinois Chicago
2016	Lindenwood	194.925	Southeast Missouri
2015	Lindenwood	195.800	Texas Woman's
2014	Southeast Missouri	195.275	Illinois State
2013	Illinois Chicago	195.600	Centenary
2012	Illinois State	194.800	Illinois Chicago
2011	Southeast Missouri	193.775	Southeast Missouri
2010	Texas Woman's	193.275	Texas Woman's
2009	Southeast Missouri	193.825	Illinois State
2008	Illinois Chicago	193.850	Centenary
2007	Illinois Chicago	193.900	Illinois Chicago
2006	Texas Woman's	193.200	Southeast Missouri
2005	Illinois Chicago	194.200	Texas Woman's
2004	Illinois Chicago	194.200	Illinois State
2003	Illinois Chicago	196.575	Centenary
2002	Illinois Chicago	196.250	Illinois Chicago
2001	Illinois State	193.700	Winona State
2000	Illinois Chicago	194.000	Southeast Missouri
1999	Illinois Chicago	193.900	—N/a
1998	Illinois Chicago	193.475	—N/a
1997	Southeast Missouri	194.950	—N/a
1996	Southeast Missouri	191.925	—N/a
1995	Illinois Chicago	195.525	—N/a
1994	Illinois Chicago	190.700	—N/a
1993	Northern Illinois	189.500	—N/a
1992	Northern Illinois	189.150	—N/a
1991	Southeast Missouri	190.150	—N/a

* The 2020 season was cut short due to the COVID-19 pandemic, and the conference championship (scheduled to take place at Illinois State) did not occur. The regular season title was determined by National Qualifying Score (NQS).

== Conference awards ==
=== Athlete of the Year ===
Year	Name	Institution
2026	Sophia Isbell	Texas Woman's
2026	Taylor Ingle	Southeast Missouri
2025	Jaye Mack	Illinois State
2025	Taylor Ingle	Southeast Missouri
2024	Angelica Labat	Illinois State
2024	Daisy Woodring	Texas Woman's
2023	Angelica Labat	Illinois State
2022	Angelica Labat	Illinois State
2021	Angelica Labat	Illinois State
2020	Anna Kaziska	Southeast Missouri
2019	Kayla Baddeley	Illinois Chicago
2018	Gabrielle Cooke	Illinois State
2017	Mikailla Northern	Illinois Chicago
2016	Alexis Brawner	Southeast Missouri
2015	Valeri Ingui	Lindenwood
2014	Catherine Dion	Illinois Chicago
2013	Chantel Turk	Illinois Chicago
2012	Andrea Skala	Illinois Chicago
2011	Erica Schick	Illinois State
2010	Rashonda Cannie	Texas Woman's
2009	Rikara Turner	Southeast Missouri
2008	Annie Kachman	Illinois Chicago
2007	Annie Kachman	Illinois Chicago
2006	Sandra Blake	Southeast Missouri
2005	Tara Boldt	Southeast Missouri
2005	Jennifer O'Neil	Illinois Chicago

=== Senior Athlete of the Year ===
Year	Name	Institution
2026	Amy Foret	Centenary
2025	Alana Laster	Illinois State
2024	Lydia Webb	Southeast Missouri
2023	Alix Pierce	Texas Woman's
2022	Anna Kaziska	Southeast Missouri
2021	Sierra Ponder	Centenary
2020	Cami Bea Austin	Centenary
2020	Gabrielle Cooke	Illinois State
2020	Ryan Henry	Lindenwood
2019	Mikailla Northern	Illinois Chicago
2018	Schyler Jones	Texas Woman's
2018	Kierstin Sokolowski	Lindenwood
2017	Ashley Thomas	Southeast Missouri
2016	Amanda Mohler	Illinois State
2015	Spencer Jones	Texas Woman's
2014	Catherine Dion	Illinois Chicago
2013	Tori Sarantakis	Illinois State
2012	Andrea Skala	Illinois Chicago
2011	Christina Sundgren	Southeast Missouri
2010	Andrea Orris	Illinois State
2009		
2008	Meredith Smith	Centenary
2007	Courtney Arno	Texas Woman's
2006	Veronique Meunier	Illinois Chicago
2005	Jackie Jaworowicz	Illinois Chicago

=== Newcomer of the Year ===
Year	Name	Institution
2026	Mia LeBlanc	Illinois State
2025	Bailey Upton	Texas Woman's
2024	Ally Lau	Illinois State
2024	Kaitlyn Hoiland	Texas Woman's
2023	Nirel Bart-Williams	Illinois State
2022	Alana Laster	Illinois State
2021	Madeline Gose	Texas Woman's
2020	Angelica Labat	Illinois State
2019	Anna Kaziska	Southeast Missouri
2018	Kayla Baddeley	Illinois Chicago
2017	Bria Northrup	Texas Woman's
2016	Mikailla Northern	Illinois Chicago
2015	Schyler Jones	Texas Woman's
2015	Kierstin Sokolowski	Lindenwood
2014	Alyssa Tucker	Southeast Missouri
2013	Taylor Penzien	Southeast Missouri
2012	Spencer Jones	Texas Woman's
2011	Cynthia Lemieux-Guilemette	Illinois Chicago
2010	Chantel Turk	Illinois Chicago
2009	Rashonda Cannie	Texas Woman's
2008	DeAvera Todd	Illinois Chicago
2007	Rikara Turner	Southeast Missouri
2006	Sandra Blake	Southeast Missouri
2005	Alison Ezell	Southeast Missouri
2005	Ashley Howe	Illinois Chicago

=== Woman of the Year ===
Year	Name	Institution
2026	Olivia Stratmann	Centenary
2025	Jaye Mack	Illinois State
2024	Daisy Woodring	Texas Woman's
2023	Gayla Griswold	Lindenwood
2022	Isabel Goyco	Texas Woman's
2021	Kyndall Baze	Lindenwood
2020	Dorothy Mims	Centenary
2019	Erin Alderman	Texas Woman's

Nominees for Woman of the Year must have a minimum of a 3.25 GPA and have been a member of the gymnastics team for three years. The candidate must also write a personal statement of 250 words or fewer about how her experiences as a scholar, an athlete and a leader, on her campus and in the community, have influenced her life and empowered her to have a positive impact on the world.

=== Sylvia Keiter Memorial Award ===
Year	Name	Institution
2026	Bailey Upton	Texas Woman's
2026	Claire Flores	Centenary
2025	Janelle Lopez	Southeast Missouri
2024	Elli Brownfield	Lindenwood
2023	Emma Lavelle	Centenary
2022	Makenzie Marciniak	Southeast Missouri
2021	Aleah Turon	Lindenwood
2020	Sierra Ponder	Centenary
2019	Mikailla Northern	Illinois Chicago

The Sylvia Keiter Memorial Award was established in 2019 in memory of the former Centenary gymnast, who was tragically killed while stopped to help a motorist in need. It recognizes the athlete who best exemplifies the characteristics of work ethic, dedication, encouragement, loyalty, selflessness, leading vocally and by example, and making a positive impact on everyone she meets.

=== Head Coach of the Year ===
Year	Name	Institution
2026	Ashley Lawson	Southeast Missouri
2025	Bob Conkling	Illinois State
2024	Catelyn Branson	Lindenwood
2023	Ashley Lawson	Southeast Missouri
2022	Bob Conkling	Illinois State
2021	Ashley Lawson	Southeast Missouri
2020	Ashley Lawson	Southeast Missouri
2019	Mary Jansson	Illinois Chicago
2019	Peter Jansson	Illinois Chicago
2018	Jen Llewellyn (née Kesler)	Lindenwood
2017	Lisa Bowerman	Texas Woman's
2016	Jen Kesler	Lindenwood
2015	Jen Kesler	Lindenwood
2014	Lisa Bowerman	Texas Woman's
2013	Jackie Fain	Centenary
2012	Mary Jansson	Illinois Chicago
2012	Peter Jansson	Illinois Chicago
2011	Frank Kudlac	Texas Woman's
2010	Frank Kudlac	Texas Woman's
2009	Tom Farden	Southeast Missouri
2008	Tom Farden	Southeast Missouri
2007	Tom Farden	Southeast Missouri
2006	Tom Farden	Southeast Missouri
2005	Mary Jansson	Illinois Chicago
2005	Peter Jansson	Illinois Chicago

=== Assistant Coach of the Year ===
Year	Name	Institution
2026	Zan Jones	Texas Woman's
2025	Kyana George	Texas Woman's
2025	Zan Jones	Texas Woman's
2024	Sam Scherwinski	Lindenwood
2024	Sienna Crouse	Lindenwood
2023	Matt DeGrandpre	Texas Woman's
2023	Kristen Harold	Texas Woman's
2022	Kristen Harold	Texas Woman's
2021	Megan Harrington	Illinois State
2021	Chris Muras	Illinois State
2020	Kristen Harold	Texas Woman's
2020	Stephen Hood	Texas Woman's
2019	Becky Colvin	Lindenwood
2019	Brittany Harris	Lindenwood
2019	Cody Llewellyn	Lindenwood
2018	Jeffrey Langenstein	Lindenwood
2018	Ashley Lawson	Lindenwood
2017	Garrett Griffeth	Texas Woman's
2016	Jennifer Langley (née Grabowski)	Lindenwood
2015	Jennifer Grabowski	Lindenwood
2014	Sarah Brown	Southeast Missouri
2013		
2012	Josh Nilson	Texas Woman's
2011	Lisa Bowerman	Texas Woman's
2011	Jessie Kinder	Southeast Missouri
2010	Lisa Bowerman	Texas Woman's
2010	Jimmy Wickham	Southeast Missouri
2009	Steve Avgerinos	Illinois State
2008	Brogan Jacobsen	Southeast Missouri
2007	Lisa Bowerman	Texas Woman's
2007	Brogan Jacobsen	Southeast Missouri
2006	Steve Avgerinos	Illinois State
2005	Jackie Fain	Centenary

== See also ==
- NCAA Women's Gymnastics Championships
- Google MIC website
