= Mary Elizabeth Downey =

American librarian, and activist of the modern library movement (1872-1949)

Mary Elizabeth Downey (c. 1872 – May 25, 1949) was a librarian and activist who created and promoted library science education courses across the Midwestern and Western United States. She is regarded as a pioneer of the modern library movement.

== Early life and education ==
Mary Elizabeth Downey was born in Sarahsville, Ohio, c. 1872 to Dr. Hiram James and Martha Ball Downey. She was raised in a middle-class, Protestant family, and taught in her local public schools. In 1899, she earned a B.A. in classics from Denison University. She then studied library science from 1899 to 1901 through the University of Chicago Extension Division and was one of only seventeen students to graduate.

== Career ==
After graduating from the University of Chicago Extension Division, she took a position as first assistant librarian with the Field Museum in Chicago and worked there until 1902. Records show that she also worked as a faculty member of the University of Chicago Extension Division's library school around the same time and wrote a letter to the university's president in defense of the program after it was criticized by the ALA. In 1903, the decision was made to close the library school. Downey, acting as President of the University of Chicago Library Students Club, wrote another letter to the dean of the university, requesting that the school show loyalty to its students by keeping the program open and continuing its work. Neither her letter nor the many other letters of protest the university received dissuaded President William Rainey Harper from closing the school.

Downey moved on to Ottumwa, Iowa, where she became the town's first public librarian, receiving recommendations from her former instructor and University of Chicago librarian Zella Allen Dixson, the dean of women of Shephardson College, the pastor of the local Baptist church, a teacher at the local high school, the librarian of the Art Institute of Chicago, and President Harper of the University of Chicago.

Dr. Suzanne M. Stauffer writes in her article, "'She Speaks as One Having Authority': Mary E. Downey's Use of Libraries as a Means to Public Power":

During her time in Ottumwa Downey began a story hour in the library, invited Friends of the Library to give presentations on books, and gave talks on the history of the book and the library at the high school. She also established the Children's Library League, which met weekly to read and discuss books, with the motto 'Clean hearts, clean hands, and clean books.'

Downey was elected secretary of the Iowa Library Association for the 1904 to 1905 term. Around this time, she and several other female librarians accused Melvil Dewey of sexual harassment, which ultimately led to him being expelled from both the ALA and the New York Library Association. In 1906, Downey became the director of the Chautauqua School for Librarians, a short-course summer school which Downey would expand in 1918 into a professional certificate program. She acted as the school's director every summer for thirty years.

In 1908, Downey became Ohio's state library organizer. Stauffer writes that Downey's main duties were to "encourage tax support for libraries, assist with the organization and cataloging of collections and the standardization of library procedures, increase the use of libraries, develop library extension, and encourage formal library training. In 1910 alone she made 216 visits to 116 towns; gave twenty-six addresses in support of the library movement to mass meetings, women's clubs, teachers' institutes, and other groups; and presided over district library meetings in six cities." In her addresses to the teachers' institutes, she called for teachers to utilize public libraries in education, promote the reading of "good books" (i.e. books that encouraged good morals), and provide education for librarians. She also represented the state of Ohio in the meetings of the Ohio Library Association, the American Library Association, the League of Library Commissions, the Ohio Federation of Women's Clubs, and the General Federation of Women's Clubs.

In 1911, the governor of Ohio appointed a new state librarian who cleared out much of the staff, including Downey. Downey went on to serve two terms as the president of the Ohio Library Association before being offered the position of Utah state library organizer in 1914 with a recommendation from American Library Association secretary George Utley. Her main duty as Utah library organizer was to spend ten to fourteen days at each library in the state training the staff and library boards in procedures and policies. In 1916, she took on the position of state library secretary while continuing to work as organizer. After two years, Downey had visited every library in Utah multiple times, calling for tax-funded libraries, assisting with Carnegie grant applications, evaluating the libraries, recommending materials, and speaking before community groups.

Downey once gave a speech to the Utah Federation of Women's Clubs in Salt Lake City, stating:

When we realize that Utah is the only state between the Mississippi Valley and the coast states which has organized library work, you can see how necessary it is that we endeavor to make this work as complete as possible, because we are setting the pace for all this territory[,] and other states will be looking to us as a model.

Downey pushed for the passage of the County Public Libraries Act which established a county library system in Utah that provided public libraries to rural areas. The Act was passed in 1919 not long after the end of World War I, and Downey convinced the Library War Service to donate its unused books to Utah's new, rural county libraries.

Throughout her career, Downey continued to promote education for librarians by offering Utah librarians scholarships to the Chautauqua School, starting a traveling school that would hold six-week sessions in various places in Utah, and calling for library boards to pay for their librarians to attend school.

In 1921, Downey became the state library organizer for North Dakota and began reforming the state's libraries just as she had in Utah by calling for a county library system. Downey then returned to Denison University in 1923 as the school's librarian and received her M.A. there the following year.

In 1929, Downey was reappointed Ohio state library organizer—a position which she would hold until 1931.

== Later life ==
In 1941, Downey became a volunteer librarian at the National Woman's Party's Alva Belmont Feminist Library, now known as the Florence Bayard Hilles Feminist Library, which continues to specialize in materials about the women's movement. Downey organized the library's initial collection and promoted women's issues through a variety of mediums throughout her time there. Mary Elizabeth Downey died on May 25, 1949, in Virginia Beach, Virginia. Her obituary labeled her a pioneer of the library movement.

== Personal views and activism ==
=== Religion and books ===
In 1902, Downey gave an address to the Iowa Library Association advocating that librarians "not force even a child into using the library, but if possible, lead [the child] voluntarily into the reading habit..." Downey believed that librarians could instill cultural norms and mores in children by providing them with books that encouraged adherence to those values. She would reiterate this message in public lectures she delivered at the Chautauqua School for Librarians. As Stauffer writes:

Speaking in the Hall of Philosophy on 'The Evolution of the Library,' Downey concluded that 'it is the birthright of every child to have access to a good collection of books just as it is his birthright to have a free education' and declared that 'the development of a love for regular and for good reading is necessary to bring the child to the proper development.'

Downey also spoke before the American Library Association's Religious Books Round Table in 1932 and advocated the use of inspirational materials to help people who were struggling in the Great Depression.

=== Literacy and education ===
Downey advised schools to have at least one book per child in the classroom and called for rural schools to house branch libraries in order to encourage the creation of the first "generation of readers." Downey stated in speeches that public libraries could provide all the benefits of a university for the entire community.

In 1923, Downey spoke to the Daughters of the American Revolution, stating:

patriotic organizations can do more to bring about peace and international understanding by promoting the study of the histories, the philosophies, and the languages and literature in the different countries.

=== Feminism ===
Downey was a member of the Columbus Equal Suffrage Association and advocated for women's right to vote. She would later work for the National Woman's Party and promote feminist literature in libraries.

Downey spoke out for women's equal employment in libraries by joining several other female librarians in asking the War Service Committee to stop protecting women from hard work. She also wrote a letter to the executive secretary of the Library War Service asking that the military lift its ban on women in the Camp Library Service.

== Professional associations ==
Downey served on the Publications Committee of the League of Library Commissions in 1911, as the League's second vice president in 1914, and then on the executive board from 1915 to 1918.

Downey was a member of the American Library Association Council from 1914 to 1916 due to her position as president of the Ohio Library Association at the time. She would rejoin the Council in 1920 when she became president of the Utah Library Association and again in 1922 when she became president of the North Dakota Library Association. In 1923, she was appointed to a five-year term on the Council. Downey also served on the American Library Association's Committee on Legislation from 1920 to 1927.

== See also ==
- North Dakota State Library
- Public libraries in North America
- American Library Association
- General Federation of Women's Clubs
- National Woman's Party
- Feminism in the United States
- Women's suffrage in the United States
