= University of Chicago Extension Division Library School =

Coordinates: 41°47′23″N 87°35′59″W

The University of Chicago Extension Division Library School was one of the pioneering training programs for librarians in the United States. The library school was a section within the Extension Division's Class-Study Department. It closed in 1903 after receiving controversial criticisms from the American Library Association.

== History ==
=== Beginnings ===
The University of Chicago Extension Division began offering courses in “library economy” in January 1897. The courses covered such topics as the history of library economy to 1870, bookbinding, and how to use libraries.

For the 1897-1898 school year, the program began focusing more on library work and offered three courses: "The Modern Library Movement," "Cataloging and Classification," and "Bibliography and Reference Work." The following year, it offered the courses "Historical and Literary Outlines of Library Economy," "Technical Methods," and "Bibliography and Reference Work." In 1901, the course "Principles of Library Administration" was also added.

=== Shift to Library Training ===
By 1900, the library courses had completely transformed into a school for training librarians with Zella Allen Dixson as the instructor and director. Students were required to have at least two years of college experience before being admitted into the program. While students of any major were allowed to enroll, credits were only granted to those who were library students. Each course met once a week for a two-hour session with the entire program taking two years to complete. The school used a learn-by-doing strategy in which students worked in the university library. There were three faculty members: Dixson, cataloger Josephine Robertson, and Mary E. Downey. Despite Robertson's requests, the library science courses never became a degree program and instead offered only a certificate to students.

=== Controversy & Closure ===
The American Library Association’s College and Reference Library Section sent a letter to University of Chicago President William Rainey Harper criticizing the library school. The exact criticisms were that there were no entrance requirements, only 200 hours were required to complete the program, there was only one instructor (Dixson) and she was incompetent, the program did not provide the opportunity to apply the skills being taught, and the students were promised jobs that they did not receive. Dixson denied each of these allegations and stated her belief that information about the Extension Division and the success of the library school's graduates had been suppressed from the major professional journals of the time. She also claimed that Katharine Sharp, who had founded and directed the library school at the University of Illinois Urbana-Champaign, hated everything associated with the University of Chicago and was working with Melvil Dewey of the ALA's College Library Section to eliminate the competition the Extension Division program created with her school. Dixson wrote a letter to Harper reminding him that, if he decided to close down the program, it would cost the university thousands of dollars in returned tuition and cause the school's library to lose its student workers. Faculty member and alumna Mary E. Downey also wrote a letter defending the program. In it, she stated that she chose the University of Chicago Extension Division because it was more practical than several other library schools, including the one at the University of Illinois.

In July 1903, the ALA's Committee on Library Training issued a report evaluating different library science programs. The committee consisted of the directors of six of the programs evaluated in the report, including Katharine Sharp of the University of Illinois. The report incorrectly named cataloger Josephine Robertson as the director of the University of Chicago Extension Division's library school and the training program's sole instructor. The report went on to state that the program's admissions requirements were inadequate and that either three years of college or an entrance examination should be required. It also criticized the school for allowing students to only partially complete the program, saying that this policy could cause confusion among potential employers who may believe that the students are all qualified graduates.

In October 1903, Harper decided to close the Extension Division's library school. The dean of the University College received many letters of protests, including one from Mary E. Downey who was acting as President of the University of Chicago Library Students Club. Downey requested the school show loyalty to its students by keeping the program open and continuing its work. The letters did not dissuade Harper from closing the library school.

== See also ==
- library science
- Education for librarianship
- University of Chicago
- Zella Allen Dixson
- William Rainey Harper
- Melvil Dewey
- Katharine Sharp
- American Library Association
