= Illinois State University College of Arts and Sciences =

- Type: Public
- Affiliations: Illinois State University
- Dean: Dr. Heather Dillaway
- Location: Normal, Illinois, U.S. 40.5082°N 88.9890°W
- Campus: Urban
- Website: cas.illinoisstate.edu

The Illinois State University College of Arts and Sciences offers undergraduate and graduate programs with a focus in the humanities, liberal arts, social sciences, and natural sciences at Illinois State University. Of all the colleges at Illinois State University, the College of Arts and Sciences is the largest with several accredited programs within their various departments.

== Location ==
The College of Arts and Sciences is located on the Illinois State University campus in the Stevenson Hall building. Stevenson Hall can be found between Williams Hall and Watterson Towers, south of School Street in Normal, IL.

== Accredited programs ==
Several programs in the college are accredited by disciple-specific accreditors:

- School Psychology Ph.D. accredited by American Psychological Association
- School Psychology Specialist in S.S.P. accredited by National Association of School Psychologists
- Legal Studies B.A. and B.S. accredited by American Bar Association
- Mathematics in Actuarial Science B.A. and B.S., M.S. accredited by Society of Actuaries
- Public Relations B.A. and B.S. accredited by Public Relations Society of America
- Social Work B.S.W. and M.S.W. accredited by the Council on Social Work Education
- Speech-Language Pathology M.A. and M.S accredited by the Council on Academic Accreditation in Audiology and Speech-Language Pathology

== School of Biological Sciences ==
=== Undergraduate programs ===
- Major in General Biology
- Major in Conservation Biology
- Major in Physiology, Neuroscience, and Behavior
- Major in Plant Biology
- Major in Zoology
- Major in Molecular and Cellular Biology
- Major in Biological Sciences Teacher Education
- Minor in Biological Sciences

=== Graduate programs ===
- Master's Degree in General Biological Sciences
- Master's Degree in Behavior, Ecology, Evolution, & Systematics
- Master's Degree in Bioenergy
- Master's Degree in Biomathematics
- Master's Degree in Biotechnology
- Master's Degree in Conservation Biology
- Master's Degree in Neuroscience and Physiology
- Doctoral Degree in General Biological Sciences
- Doctoral Degree in Neuroscience and Physiology
- Doctoral Degree in Behavior, Ecology, Evolution, & Systematics
- Doctoral Degree in Molecular & Cellular Biology
- Certificate in Biology Geographic Information Systems

== School of Communication ==
=== Undergraduate programs ===
- Major in Journalism
- Major in Public Relations
- Major in Mass Media
- Major in Interpersonal Communication Studies
- Major in Organizational and Leadership Communication Studies
- Major in Public Culture and Advocacy Communication Studies
- Major in Sports Communication
- Minor in Communication Studies
- Minor in Mass Media

=== Graduate programs ===
- Master's Degree in Communication

== Department of Economics ==
=== Undergraduate programs ===
- Major in General Economics
- Major in Managerial Economics
- Minor in Economics

=== Graduate programs ===
- Master's Degree in Applied Economics
- Master's Degree in Financial Economics
- Master's Degree in Quantitative Economics
- Master's Degree in Energy and Regulatory Economics
- Master's Degree in Applied Community and Economic Development

== Department of Geography, Geology, and the Environment ==
=== Undergraduate programs ===
- Major in Geography
- Major in Geography Social Science Teacher Education
- Major in Geology
- Major in Earth and Space Science Education
- Major in Environmental Systems Science and Sustainability
- Certificate in Geographic Information Systems (GIS)
- Minor in Geography
- Minor in Geology
- Minor in Environmental Studies
- Minor in Urban Studies

=== Graduate programs ===
- Master's Degree in Hydrogeology
- Certificate in Hydrogeology Geographic Information Systems (GIS)

== Department of Languages, Literatures, and Cultures ==
=== Undergraduate programs ===
- Major in General French and Francophone Studies
- Major in General German
- Major in General Spanish
- Major in Teacher Education French and Francophone Studies
- Major in Teacher Education German
- Major in Teacher Education Spanish
- Minor in Chinese
- Minor in French
- Minor in German
- Minor in Italian
- Minor in Japanese
- Minor in Latin
- Minor in Spanish

=== Graduate programs ===
- Master's Degree in Spanish
- Certificate in Instructional Technology in World Languages
- Certificate in Teaching English to Speakers of Other Languages

== Department of Mathematics ==
=== Undergraduate programs ===
- Major in Actuarial Science
- Major in Mathematics
- Major in Mathematics Teacher Education
- Major in Statistics
- Accelerated Mathematics Sequence
- Minor in Mathematics

=== Graduate programs ===
- Master's Degree in Actuarial Science
- Master's Degree in Biomathematics
- Master's Degree in Elementary and Middle School Mathematics Education
- Master's Degree in Applied Statistics
- Master's Degree in Mathematics
- Doctoral Degree in Mathematics Education

== Department of Physics ==
=== Undergraduate programs ===
- Major in Physics
- Major in Engineering Physics
- Major in Computational Physics
- Major in Biophysics
- Major in Physics Teacher Education
- Minor in Physics

=== Graduate programs ===
- Master's Degree in Physics

== Department of Psychology ==
=== Undergraduate programs ===
- Major in Psychology
- Minor in Psychology
- Minor in Cognitive Science
- Minor in Children's Studies
- Minor in Civic Engagement and Social Responsibility

=== Graduate programs ===
- Master's Degree in Cognitive and Experimental Psychology
- Master's Degree in Developmental Psychology
- Master's Degree in Industrial/Organizational Social Psychology
- Master's Degree in Quantitative Psychology
- Master's Degree in Clinical-Counseling Psychology
- Master's Degree in Specialist in School Psychology
- Doctoral Degree in School Psychology

== Department of Sociology and Anthropology ==
=== Undergraduate programs ===
- Major in Anthropology
- Major in Sociology
- Minor in Anthropology
- Minor in Sociology

=== Graduate programs ===
- Master's Degree in Anthropology
- Master's Degree in Sociology
- Certificate in Museum Studies
- Certificate in Latin American and Latino Studies

== Department of Chemistry ==
=== Undergraduate Programs ===
- Major in Chemistry
- Major in Chemistry Education
- Major in Biochemistry
- Minor in Chemistry

=== Graduate Programs ===
- Master's Degree in Chemistry

== Department of Communication Sciences and Disorders ==
=== Undergraduate Programs ===
- Major in Communication Sciences and Disorders
- Minor in Communication Sciences and Disorders

=== Graduate Programs ===
- Master's Degree in Speech-Language Pathology
- Master's Degree in Audiology

== Department of English ==
=== Undergraduate programs ===
- Major in English Studies
- Major in English Teacher Education
- Major in English - Creative Writing focus
- Major in English - Publishing focus
- Major in English - Technical Writing and Rhetorics focus
- Major in English - Literary and Cultural Studies focus
- Minor in English
- Minor in Teaching English to Speakers of Other Languages
- Minor in Writing

=== Graduate programs ===
- Master's Degree in English
- Master's Degree in English Education
- Doctoral Degree in English Studies
- Certificate in Teaching English to Speakers of Other Languages

== Department of History ==
=== Undergraduate programs ===
- Major in History
- Major in History - Social Sciences Teacher Education
- Minor in History

=== Graduate programs ===
- Master's Degree in History

== Department of Latin American and Latino/a Studies ==
=== Undergraduate programs ===
- Minor in Latin American and Latino/a Studies

== Department of Philosophy ==
=== Undergraduate programs ===
Sourcex

- Major in Philosophy
- Minor in Philosophy

== Department of Politics and Government ==
=== Undergraduate programs ===
- Major in Political Science
- Major in Legal Studies
- Major in Legal Studies: Language Integration
- Major in Interdisciplinary Legal Studies
- Minor in Political Science
- Minor in Legal Studies
- Minor in Middle Eastern and South Asian Studies
- Minor in Peace and Conflict Resolution Studies
- Minor in Women's and Gender Studies

=== Graduate programs ===
- Master's Degree in Political Science
- Master's Degree in Public Service
- Master's Degree in Global Politics
- Master's Degree in Applied Community and Economic Development
- Certificate in Legal Studies (with bachelor's degree)
- Certificate in Legal Studies (without bachelor's degree)

== School of Social Work ==
=== Undergraduate Programs ===
- Major in Social Work

=== Graduate programs ===
- Master's Degree in Child and Family Practice
- Master's Degree in School Social Work
- Certificate in Post MSW School Social Work
- Certificate in Women's, Gender, and Sexuality Studies for Social Workers
- Certificate in Child Welfare

== Women's, Gender, and Sexuality Studies Program ==
=== Undergraduate programs ===
- Minor in Women's, Gender, and Sexuality Studies

=== Graduate programs ===
- Certificate in Queer Studies
- Certificate in Women's, Gender, and Sexuality Studies
