= Illinois State University College of Business =

Coordinates: 40°30′25.3″N 88°59′30.2″W

- Type: Public business school
- Established: 1967
- Affiliations: Illinois State University
- Endowment: US$ 16.4 million (2012)
- Dean: Ajay Samant
- Academic staff: 99
- Undergraduates: 3,854
- Postgraduates: 174
- Location: Normal, Illinois, United States
- Campus: Urban
- Website: business.illinoisstate.edu

The Illinois State University College of Business is the business school at Illinois State University.

The college is divided into five academic departments:

- Accounting
- Finance, Insurance, and Law
- Management and Quantitative Methods
- Marketing
- Master of Business Administration

== Campus ==
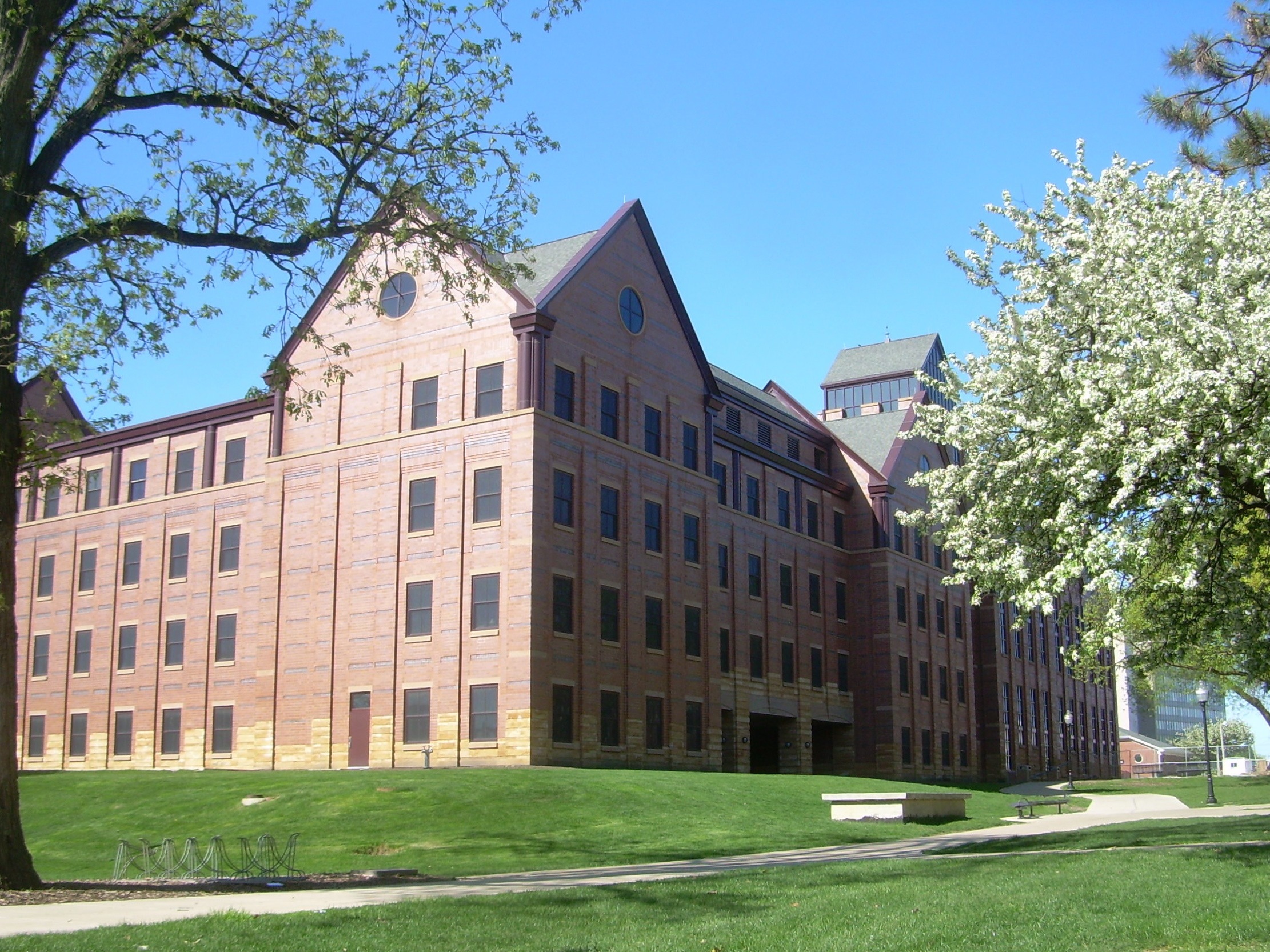
State Farm Hall of Business

The College of Business campus is located in the State Farm Hall of Business in Normal, Illinois. The $28 million facility opened in 2005.

== Rankings and accreditations ==
Business school rankings

U.S. MBA Rankings
- Bloomberg (2025): NR

- The undergraduate program was listed among the "Best Undergraduate Business Schools" by Bloomberg Businessweek.
- The college was recognized as one of the "Best Business Schools" in the 2011 ranking by U.S. News & World Report.
- The graduate program was ranked ninth in the Princeton Review's 2013 ranking of best-administered MBA programs. The ranking was a part of the "Best 296 Business Schools: 2013 Edition". Illinois State was the only public university in Illinois listed in the top 10 in any of the categories.
- Illinois State is one of 181 schools to receive both business and accounting accreditation from the Association to Advance Collegiate Schools of Business. This accreditation is given to high quality and excellence programs that continue to improve undergraduate and graduate business programs.
- Illinois State is one of only 16 U.S. universities that is a full member of the University Sales Center Alliance (USCA).
