= Illinois State University College of Education =

Coordinates: 40°30′32.2″N 88°59′33.7″W

With 41 accredited teacher education programs, Illinois State University is one of the premier teaching preparation institutions in the nation. The College of Education offers undergraduate and graduate teacher education and administrator preparation programs and certificates.

== Accreditations ==
Illinois State University has been accredited since 1954.

In April 2012, the Board of Examiners found that Illinois State successfully met all six of the national standards for educator preparation. Illinois State also achieved the target marks in four standards. The NCATE report cited the following areas of strength:

- Content preparation of educators
- Clinical experience opportunities for candidates
- Initiatives to incorporate diversity across the unit
- Broad participation of faculty members in the unit governance system

== School of Teaching and Learning ==
=== Undergraduate programs ===
- Early Childhood Education
- Elementary Education
- Elementary Education: Bilingual/Bicultural Sequence
- Middle Level Education

=== Graduate programs ===
- Master's Degree in Reading
- Master's Degree in Teaching and Learning
- Doctoral in Teaching and Learning

== Department of Special Education ==
=== Undergraduate programs ===
- Special Education: Specialist in Deaf and Hard Hearing Sequence
- Special Education: Specialist in Learning and Behavior Sequence
- Special Education: Specialist in Low Vision and Blindness Sequence

=== Graduate programs ===
- Master's Degree in Special Education (Master of Science or Master of Science in Education)
- Doctoral in Special Education
- Graduate Certificate Programs
  - Deaf and Hard of Hearing Listening and Spoken Language Profession
  - Director of Special Education
  - Learning and Behavior Specialist II: Behavior Intervention Specialist
  - Learning and Behavior Specialist II: Curriculum Adaptation Specialist
  - Learning and Behavior Specialist II: Multiple Disabilities Specialist
  - Learning and Behavior Specialist II: Transition Specialist

== Department of Educational Administration and Foundations ==
=== Social foundations ===
Social Foundations are undergraduate courses taken in EAF.

=== Graduate programs ===
- Master's Degree in College Student Personnel Administration
- Master's Degree in P-12 Educational Administration (Principal Preparation)
- Doctoral in Higher Education Administration
- Doctoral in P-12 Administration
- Graduate certificates/endorsements
  - Chief School Business Official Endorsement
  - Superintendent Endorsement
