= Reggie Redbird =

Mascot for Illinois State University

Reggie Redbird is the mascot for Illinois State University located in Normal, Illinois. Reggie is present at all home football games, women's volleyball matches, men's basketball games, women's basketball games, and appears at various other athletic events. Reggie also does numerous of appearances at schools and events within the Twin Cities, the state of Illinois, and the country.

Reggie Redbird is a student bedecked in costume. Reggie was named in 1980 after a contest among Junior Redbird Club Members. The first suit was donated by Rick Percy, general manager of Clemens and Associates Insurance and a longtime member of The Redbird Club.

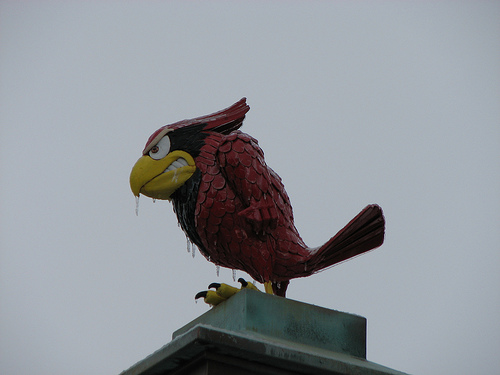
Reggie Redbird statue on the Illinois State campus

== History ==
The nickname "Redbirds" for the sports teams (replacing the unofficial mascot "Pedagogs" or "Fighting Teachers") was adopted by the then Illinois State Normal University in 1923 by the athletic director Clifford E. "Pop" Horton, with an assist from The Daily Pantagraph sports editor Fred Young.

Horton liked "Cardinals" because the school colors, established in 1894–95, were cardinal and white, and the University teams were known by that nickname for a short period of time. Young recommended the change to "Red birds" to avoid confusion in the headlines with the St. Louis Cardinals baseball team, and the two words were joined to "Redbirds" by the 1930s.

The mascot is named after MLB Hall of Famer Reggie Jackson, who has no connection to the university or the state of Illinois.
