= Illinois State Redbirds =

Collegiate sports club in the United States

- University: Illinois State University
- NCAA: Division I (FCS)
- Conference: Missouri Valley Conference (primary); Midwest Independent Conference (women's gymnastics); Missouri Valley Football Conference (football); Summit League (men's tennis)
- Athletic director: Jeri Beggs
- Location: Normal, Illinois
- Varsity teams: 19 (8 men's, 11 women's)
- Football stadium: Hancock Stadium
- Basketball arena: CEFCU Arena
- Baseball stadium: Duffy Bass Field
- Softball stadium: Marian Kneer Softball Stadium
- Soccer field: Adelaide Street Field
- Other venues: Evergreen Racquet Club; McCormick Courts; Weibring Golf Club
- Nickname: Redbirds
- Colors: Red and white
- Mascot: Reggie Redbird
- Fight song: Go, You Redbirds
- Website: goredbirds.com

The Illinois State Redbirds are the athletic teams that represent Illinois State University in Normal, Illinois. Teams play at the NCAA Division I level (FCS in football). Most teams compete in the Missouri Valley Conference except football (Missouri Valley Football Conference), women's gymnastics (Midwest Independent Conference) and men's tennis (Summit League). The fight song is Go, You Redbirds.

== History ==
Athletics at Illinois State consists of 19 sports, having won 160 MVC league titles.

Illinois State began its athletics program more than 100 years ago. In 1923, athletics director Clifford E. "Pop" Horton and the Daily Pantagraph sports editor Fred Young collaborated to change the university's nickname from "Teachers." Horton wanted "Cardinals" because the colors were cardinal and white (set in 1895–96). Young changed the nickname to "Red Birds" to avoid confusion in the headlines with the St. Louis Cardinals. It took roughly 10 years for Red Birds to become one word.

From approximately 1908 to 1970, Illinois State was affiliated with the Illinois Intercollegiate Athletic Conference and were charter members. The school, which had already been an NCAA Division I competitor for a decade, left behind its independent status in 1980 and affiliated itself with the Missouri Valley Conference. From 1981 to 1992, Redbird women's teams competed under the Gateway Collegiate Athletic Conference banner before women's sports were absorbed into the Missouri Valley Conference. Today, 14 of the 17 Redbird sports compete in the Missouri Valley Conference, with the football team playing in the Missouri Valley Football Conference, formerly known as the Gateway Football Conference.

=== Redbird 7 ===
On 7 April 2015, seven men died when a privately owned Cessna 414 carrying Redbirds men's basketball coach Torrey Ward, Deputy Director of Athletics Aaron Leetch, and five community members and athletics supporters crashed. The group was returning from Indianapolis, where they attended the NCAA Men's Division I Basketball Championship Final. The plane crashed in a soybean field outside of Central Illinois Regional Airport in McLean County. The University and Athletics Department memorialized the victims in several ways, including a uniform patch worn by all 19 teams throughout the 2015–16 sports seasons. Among other displays, the men are remembered in a permanent memorial called Redbird Remembrance, near the north entrance of Redbird Arena.

== Sports sponsored ==
A member of the Missouri Valley Conference, Illinois State University sponsors eight men's and eleven women's teams in NCAA sanctioned sports:

Men's sports	Women's sports
Baseball	Basketball
Basketball	Cross country
Cross country	Golf
Football	Gymnastics
Golf	Soccer
Tennis	Softball
Track and field ^{†}	Swimming and diving
	Tennis
	Track and field ^{†}
	Volleyball
† – Track and field includes both indoor and outdoor

=== Men's basketball ===
Missouri Valley Conference in Illinois State colors

Missouri Valley Conference Titles

- Regular Season: 1984, 1992, 1993, 1997, 1998, 2017
- Conference Tournament: 1983, 1990, 1997, 1998
- NCAA Appearances: 1983, 1984, 1985, 1990, 1997, 1998
- NIT Appearances: 1977, 1978, 1980, 1987, 1988, 1995, 1996, 2001, 2008, 2009, 2010, 2012, 2015, 2017, 2026
- CBI Appearances: 2014, 2025

=== Women's basketball ===
- Missouri Valley Conference Titles: 1983, 1989, 2005, 2008, 2009, 2022
- NCAA Appearances: 1983, 1985, 1989, 2005, 2008, 2022
- Women's National Invitation Tournament Appearances: 2007, 2009, 2010, 2011, 2012, 2013, 2021, 2023, 2024
- During the 2007-2008 season, former head coach Dr. Jill Hutchison was recognized for her pioneering work in the advancement of women’s basketball. A banner was hung from the rafters at Redbird Arena in her honor.
- 2009 Kristi Cirone becomes the all-time leading scorer.
- December 28, 2009 Kristi Cirone's No. 10 jersey was retired at Redbird Arena.
- Fell to Iowa in the first round of the 2022 NCAA Tournament, in their first appearance under head coach Kristen Gillespie.

=== Football ===
- Missouri Valley Football Conference Championships: 1999, 2014, 2015
- NCAA Division I Football Championship Playoffs: 1998, 1999, 2006, 2012, 2014, 2015, 2016, 2019, 2024
- 1998: Lost at Northwestern State
- 1999: Defeated Colgate and Hofstra before losing at eventual national champion Georgia Southern
- 2006: Lost at Youngstown State
- 2012: Defeated App State in overtime before losing at Eastern Washington
- 2014: Defeated UNI, Eastern Washington, and New Hampshire before losing to NDSU in the FCS National Championship Game
- 2015: Defeated UNI before losing to Richmond
- 2016: Lost at Central Arkansas
- 2019: Defeated Southeast Missouri State, Central Arkansas, before losing to NDSU
- 2024: Defeated Southeast Missouri State before losing to UC Davis
- 2025: Defeated Southeast Louisiana, North Dakota State, UC Davis, and Villanova, before losing to Montana State in the FCS National Championship Game.

FCS National Championship Game

Date played	Location	Champion		Runner-Up	
January 10, 2015	Toyota Stadium	NDSU	29	Illinois State	27
January 5, 2026	FirstBank Stadium	Montana State	35	Illinois State	34

Bowl Games

Date played	Bowl	Champion		Runner-Up	
November 23, 1950	Corn Bowl	Missouri-Rolla	7	Illinois State	6
December 4, 1999	Pecan Bowl	Illinois State	37	Hofstra	20
December 1, 2006	Pecan Bowl	Youngstown State	28	Illinois State	21

- The 1999 & 2006 the Midwest Region Championship (FCS Quarterfinal) was referred to as the Pecan Bowl
- In 1999 the Redbirds football team advanced to the Final Four and finished 3rd in the AP poll.
- Illinois State holds the NCAA Division I FCS record for the most tied football games with 66.

=== Women's soccer ===
- Missouri Valley Conference Regular Season Titles: 1998, 1999, 2001, 2003, 2007, 2008, 2009, 2011, 2013, 2014, 2016
- Missouri Valley Conference Tournament Titles: 2003, 2009, 2011, 2012, 2013, 2014, 2016
- NCAA Appearances: 2003, 2009, 2011, 2012, 2013, 2014, 2016
- 2016: W vs. Michigan (PKs), L vs. #3 Duke (1-3)
- First season: 1996
- All-Time Record: 225-145-37 (.600)
- All-Time Missouri Valley Conference Record: 82-25-11 (.746)
- 10 Missouri Valley Conference Players of the Year

=== Softball ===
Illinois State's softball team played in the Women's College World Series eight times in 1969, 1970, 1971, 1972, 1973, 1976, 1978 and 1981. The team finished as runner-up in the first WCWS in 1969, and in 1973, falling to Arizona State, 4-3, in 16 innings in the title game. On the day of the 1973 defeat, Redbirds pitcher Margie Wright heroically hurled 30 innings in three games. Ironically, for pitching too many innings in one day, a three-woman Illinois sports commission suspended her from pitching in any game in her upcoming senior season and also banned the softball team from post-season play in 1974. Wright went on to play professional softball, followed by a 33-year head coaching career. She coached the Redbirds from 1980–85, followed by 27 years at Fresno State, where she became the first NCAA Division I softball coach to reach 1000 wins and the NCAA's all-time winningest softball coach.

== National Championships ==
Illinois State has won one national championship in program history, winning the NCAA Division II Baseball Championship in 1969.

Year	Association	Division	Sport	Opponent/Runner-up	Score
1969	NCAA	Division II	Baseball	Southwest Missouri State	12–0

== Facilities ==
- Adelaide Street Field – soccer field.
- Duffy Bass Field – baseball field.
- Doug Collins Court at CEFCU Arena – main indoor arena.
- Evergreen Racquet Club – indoor tennis court.
- Hancock Stadium – football stadium.
- Horton Field House
- Marian Kneer Softball Stadium – softball field.
- McCormick Courts – outdoor tennis courts.
- Weibring Golf Club – golf course.

== Notable former athletes ==
Baseball

- Lee "Buzz" Capra – former Atlanta Braves pitcher who led the National League.
- Dave Bergman – Retired MLB player and World Series Champion (1984).
- Matt Herges – Former MLB pitcher for the Florida Marlins and Cleveland Indians.
- Dan Kolb – Retired MLB relief pitcher.
- Neal Cotts – Former MLB pitcher with the Chicago White Sox, Chicago Cubs, Texas Rangers, Milwaukee Brewers, and Minnesota Twins. World Series Champion (2005).
- Brock Stewart – Major League Baseball pitcher currently a Free Agent.
- Paul DeJong – MLB shortstop for the St. Louis Cardinals,Chicago White Sox.

Men's Basketball

- Steve Fisher – Former basketball head coach at Michigan, where he won a national title in 1989 and recruited the Fab Five, and San Diego State.
- Doug Collins – National Basketball Association broadcaster, player, coach, and Olympian.
- Dan Muller – Former Illinois State men's basketball head coach.
- Rico Hill – Was a guard for Illinois State prior to playing for the Los Angeles Clippers and in Europe.
- Tarise Bryson – Harlem Globetrotters (1998–2002).
- Chamberlain Oguchi – Member of Nigeria's 2012 Summer Olympics team.
- Paris Lee – Point guard for the French Team LDLC ASVEL

Women's Basketball

- Lorene Ramsey – Former Women's basketball coach of Illinois Central College, with a career record of 887–197.
- Charlotte Lewis – 1976 Summer Olympics Silver Medalist for the USA.
- Cathy Boswell – College Basketball All American and 1984 Summer Olympics Gold Medalist for United States women's national basketball team.
- Kristi Cirone – Former WNBA point guard

Football

- Mike Zimmer – National Football League (NFL) Head Coach for the Minnesota Vikings
- Joe Woods – NFL Defensive Coordinator for the Cleveland Browns
- Nate Palmer – Former NFL inside linebacker for the Green Bay Packers and Tennessee Titans.
- James O'Shaughnessy – NFL tight end for the Jacksonville Jaguars
- James Robinson- NFL running back for the Jacksonville Jaguars
- B. J. Bello – NFL defensive back for the Cleveland Browns
- Davontae Harris – NFL defensive back for the Denver Broncos
- Cameron Meredith – NFL wide receiver currently a Free Agent.
- Cameron Lee – NFL offensive lineman currently a Free Agent.
- Michael Liedtke – NFL offensive lineman for the Washington Football Team.
- Kevin Glenn – Former Canadian Football League quarterback.
- Colton Underwood – Former NFL tight end for the Oakland Raiders and Philadelphia Eagles and was a part of Season 14 of The Bachelorette.
- Shelby Harris – NFL defensive end for the Denver Broncos
- Boomer Grigsby – Retired NFL fullback and 2017 College Football Hall of Fame Inductee
- Mike Prior – Former NFL player and part of Green Bay Packers team that won Super Bowl XXXI
- Dennis Nelson – Former NFL player and part of Baltimore Colts team that won Super Bowl V
- Tom Nelson – Former NFL wide receiver with the Cincinnati Bengals and the Philadelphia Eagles.
- Aveion Cason – retired NFL Running back
- Laurent Robinson – Retired NFL wide receiver.

Men's Golf

- D. A. Weibring – Professional golfer on the PGA Tour.

Softball

- Margie Wright – Former professional softball player, coach for 33 years. NCAA all-time winningest softball coach.

Track & Field

- Tim Glover – 2011 & 2012 NCAA Division I Outdoor Track and Field Championships National Champion in Javelin Throw.
- Aisha Praught – Former All-American & 2016 Summer Olympics athlete for Jamaica.

Volleyball

- Cathy George, women's volleyball head coach at Michigan State
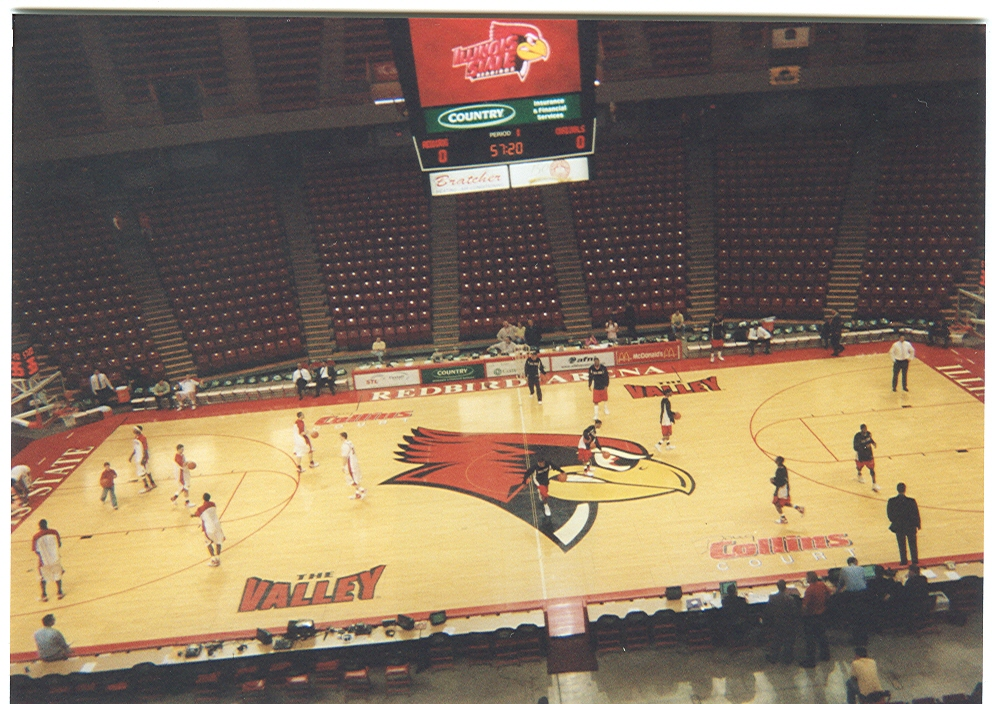
Redbird Arena

Basketball starters introduced

Free throw

Three Pointer
