= Go, You Redbirds =

Illinois State University fight song

Go, You Redbirds is the fight song for the athletic teams of Illinois State University. It was written in 1932 by Kenyon S. Fletcher. The words have been changed from time to time. Prior to the fight song we know today, the Illinois State fight song was "Normal Loyalty." At sporting events when an ISU athletic team enters the field or floor, the students and fans sing the first stanza of “Go, You Redbirds.” A new growing Redbird tradition amongst several redbird teams is to sing the fight song with the marching band to the home crowd after victories. The line "Lets win this game" is changed to "We've won this game."

== Lyrics ==
Go, you Redbirds! On to battle, fight for ISU.
Raise the banner, red and white,
to this emblem we'll be true.
So let us cheer the Redbirds on to victory.
Every voice proclaim (GO STATE!),
we've got the fight,
we've got the might,
Let's win this game!
(ISU, GO!)
