= Illinois State University =

Public university in Normal, Illinois, US

Coordinates: 40.511°N 88.993°W

- Former names: Illinois State Normal University (1857–1964); Illinois State University at Normal (1964–1967)
- Motto: Gladly We Learn and Teach
- Type: Public research university
- Established: 1857; 169 years ago
- Founder: Jesse W. Fell
- Accreditation: HLC
- Endowment: $270 million (2026)
- Budget: $603.6 million (2026)
- President: Aondover Tarhule
- Provost: Ani Yazedjian
- Administrative staff: 3,698
- Students: 21,577 (fall 2026)
- Undergraduates: 19,128 (2026)
- Postgraduates: 2,449 (2026)
- Location: Normal, Illinois, United States
- Campus: Urban campus, 1,180 acres (477.5 ha)
- Other campuses: Bloomington; Springfield
- Newspaper: The Vidette
- Colors: Red and white
- Nickname: Redbirds
- Sporting affiliations: NCAA Division I FCS MVFC — MVC
- Mascot: Reggie Redbird
- Website: illinoisstate.edu

Illinois State University (Illinois State or ISU) is a public research university in Normal, Illinois, United States. It was founded in 1857 as Illinois State Normal University and is the oldest public university in Illinois. In fall 2026, the university enrolled 21,577 students.

The university offers more than 200 academic degree programs across its seven colleges. It is classified among "R2: Doctoral Universities – High research activity".

The university's athletic teams compete in Division I of the National Collegiate Athletic Association (NCAA) and are members of the Missouri Valley Conference and the Missouri Valley Football Conference. They are known as the "Redbirds," in reference to the state bird, the cardinal.

== History ==
ISU was founded in 1857, the same year Illinois' first Board of Education was convened and two years after the Free School Act was passed by the state legislature. Among its supporters were judge and future Supreme Court Justice, David Davis and local businessman and land holder Jesse W. Fell whose friend, Abraham Lincoln, was the attorney hired by the board of education to draw up legal documents to secure the school's funding.

Founded as Illinois State Normal University, it was the first state university in Illinois. Its classes were initially held in downtown Bloomington, occupying space in Major's Hall. With the completion of Old Main in 1860, the school moved to its current campus in what was then the village of North Bloomington, which was chartered as the town of "Normal" in 1865. The new town had named itself after the university.

The editor of the Bloomington Pantagraph wrote in 1882: "The intention was to gather around the institution the different colleges, - classical, agricultural, industrial, law medical, and the other departments of a university, - until, in the end, the State should have here a grand university, equal to any." Thus the school was originally designed as a wide-ranging university with one department of teacher training. That left only a teacher-training school—indeed what was then called a "normal college". It later added many other roles and became a wide-ranging university in the 20th century.

On January 1, 1964, the institution's name was changed to Illinois State University at Normal, and then again in 1967 to the current Illinois State University. The school's motto was originally "and gladly wold he lerne and gladly teche", in the Middle English spelling of Geoffrey Chaucer. It has since been updated to modern English in the gender-neutral form "Gladly We Learn and Teach".

The Illinois Board of Higher Education in 2022 approved plans for a new College of Engineering, with the university seeking to add three programs: general engineering, electrical engineering and mechanical engineering. In January 2023, the university announced that Thomas Keyser would be the first dean of the College of Engineering, which was set to welcome its first students in 2025.

== Campus ==
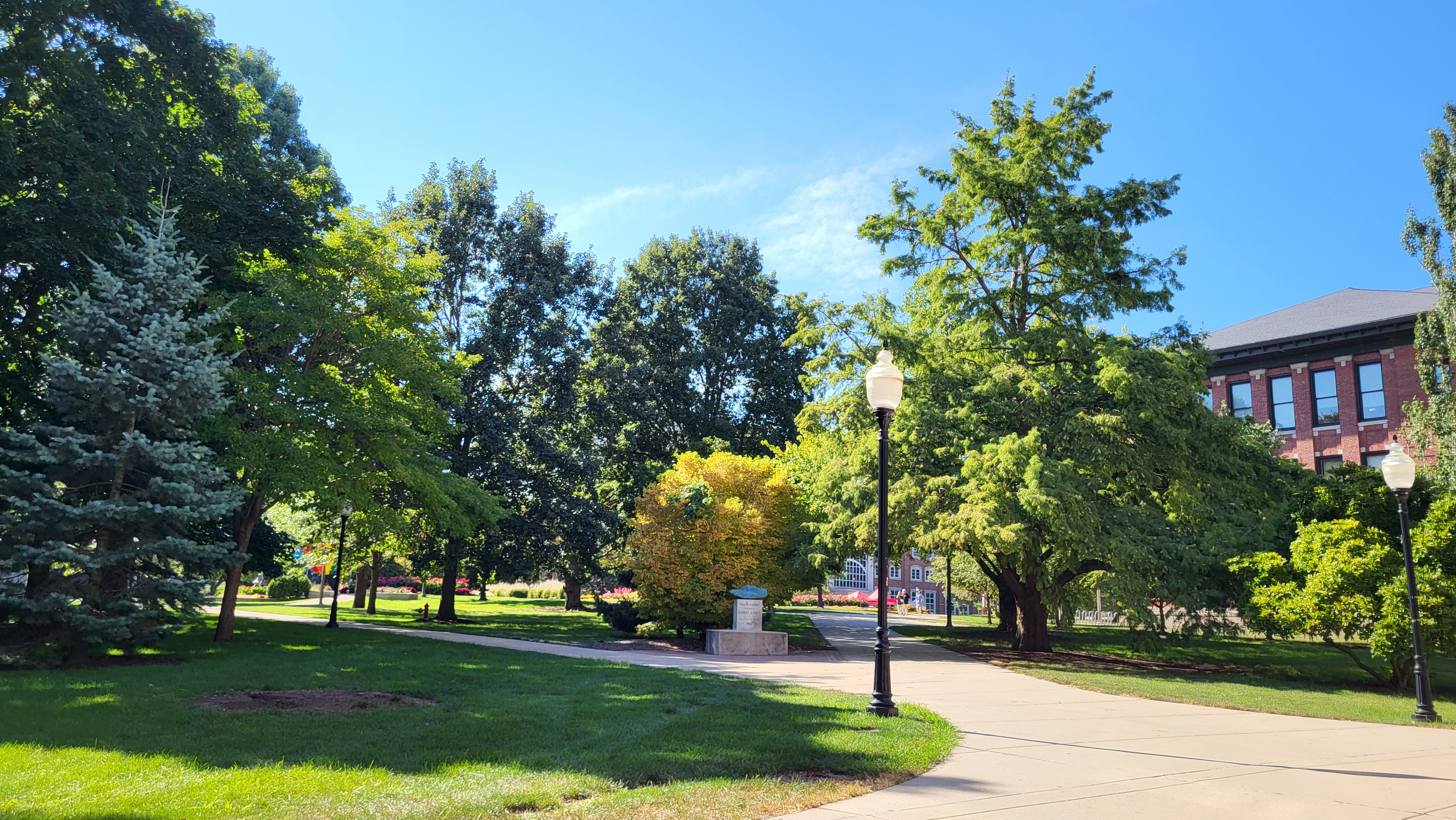
Illinois State University main quad

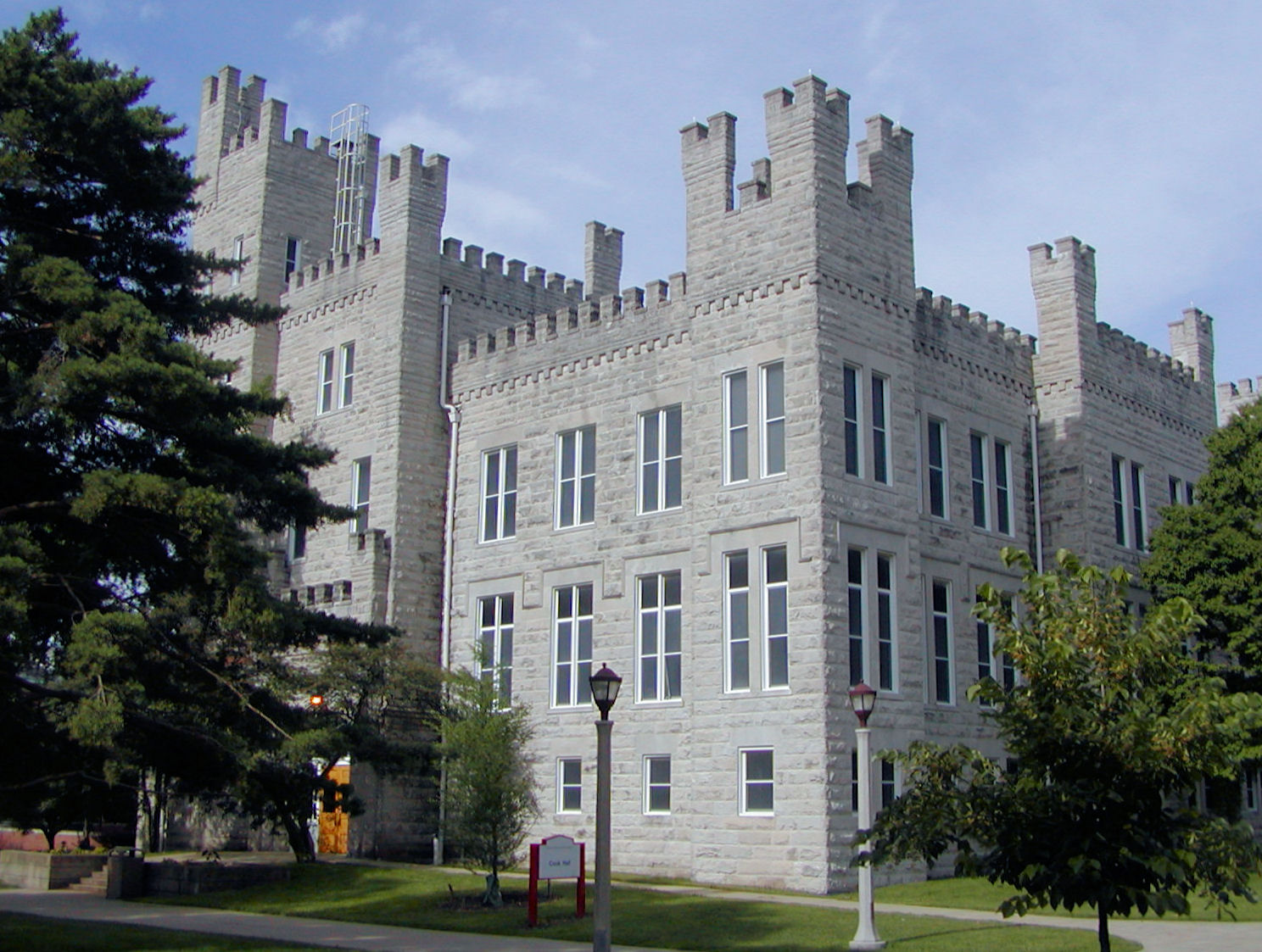
John W. Cook Hall

Initially designed by William Saunders, the Illinois State University campus quadrangle (commonly known as The Quad), is a popular outdoor venue for students and the local community. Lined with benches and shady trees, the site is a popular spot for students to relax, study, and play informal games of sports. Outdoor events such as the annual RSO showcase, Festival ISU and Concerts on the Quad are popular in the campus community. John W. Cook Hall, or Cook Hall, is a building built in 1898 that resembles a castle on the Quad of Illinois State University in Normal, Illinois. Cook Hall, named for the university's fourth president, has been listed on the National Register of Historic Places since the winter of 1986.

The ISU Quad is also host to the Fell Arboretum, which is part of a 490-acre site that represents over 154 species of trees from the state of Illinois. Trees on the north side of the quad are from Northern Illinois, and those on the south side of the quad from southern parts of the state. The Fell Arboretum is part of the Arbor Day Foundation's Tree Campus Higher Education Institution.

Illinois State University has six residence halls, one apartment complex, and dedicated apartments for upper class and graduate students. Facilities are administered by the ISU's University Housing Services.

== Academics ==
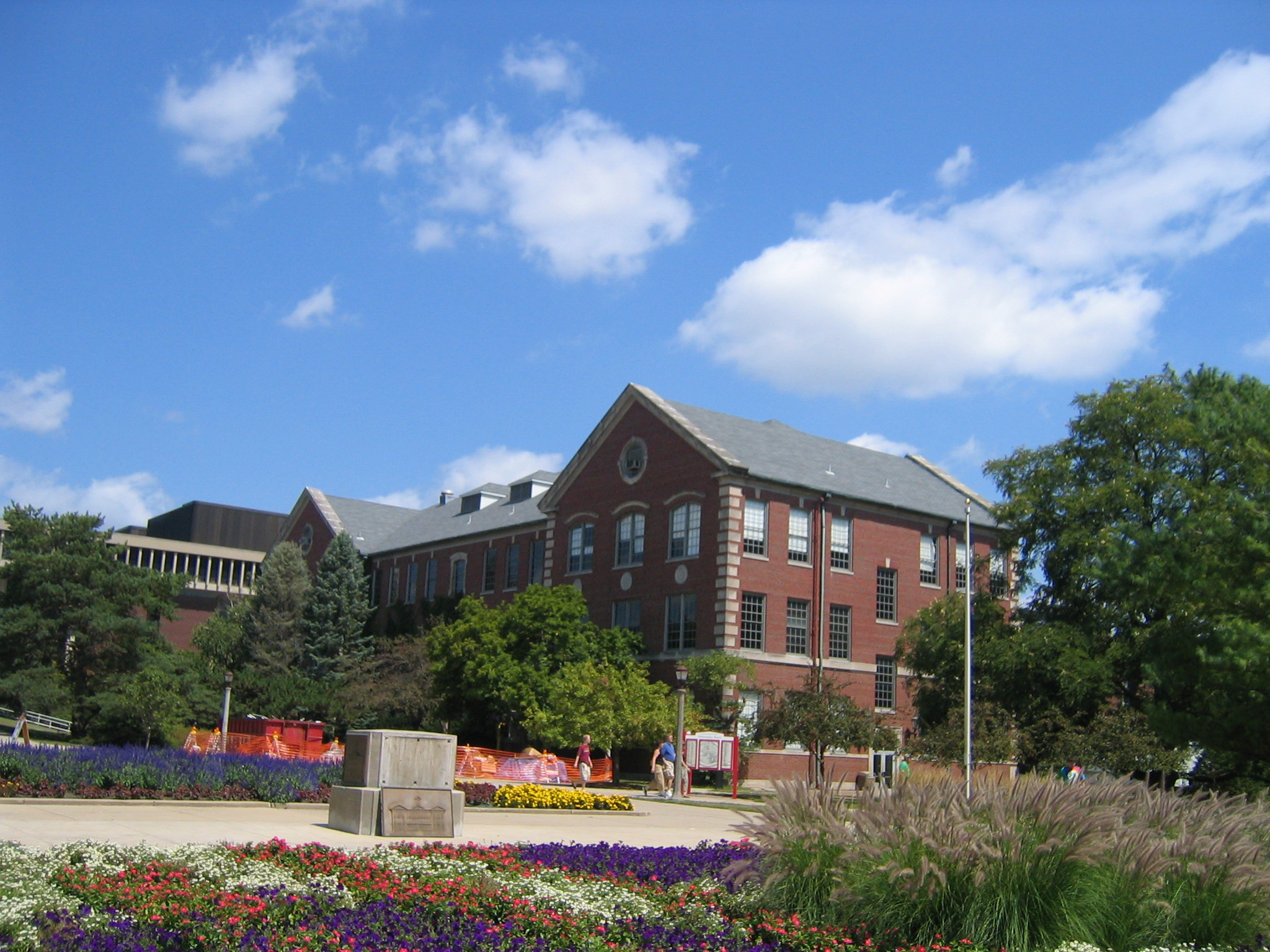
Felmley Hall of Science

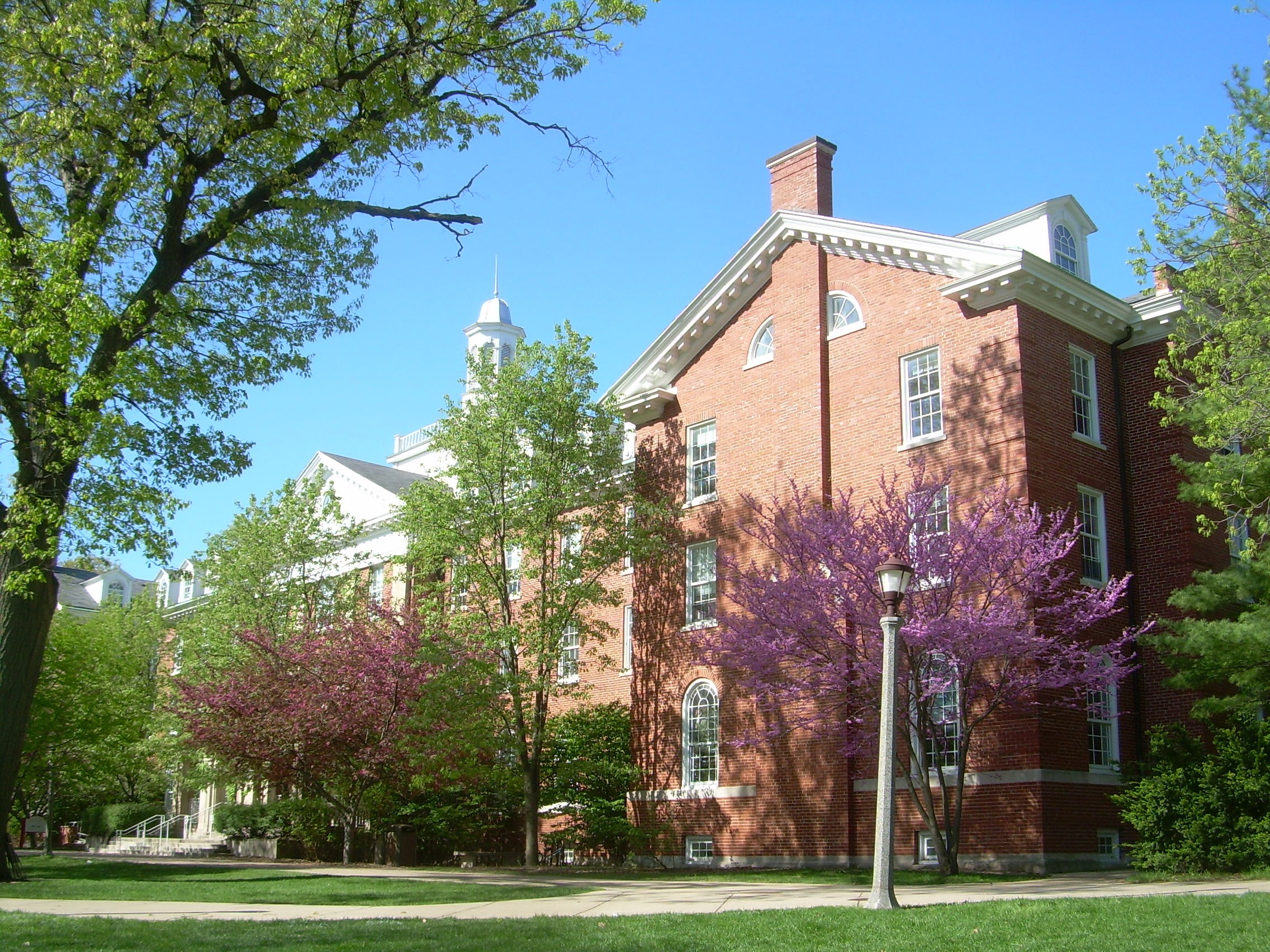
Fell Hall

Founded as a teachers' college, the university now offers a range of programs at the bachelor, master, and doctoral levels. Illinois State is accredited by the Higher Learning Commission (HLC). In addition, 22 programs hold discipline-based accreditation.

The university comprises seven colleges:

- College of Applied Science and Technology
- College of Arts and Sciences
- College of Business
- College of Education
- College of Engineering
- Mennonite College of Nursing
- Wonsook Kim College of Fine Arts

=== Laboratory schools ===
The university has two laboratory schools: University High School and Thomas Metcalf Laboratory School.

Bloomington/Normal Japanese Saturday School (ブルーミントン・ノーマル補習授業校 Burūminton Nōmaru Hoshū Jugyō Kō), a Japanese weekend school, was established in 1986 and held at the Thomas Metcalf School. It has a separate office in Normal

=== Milner Library ===
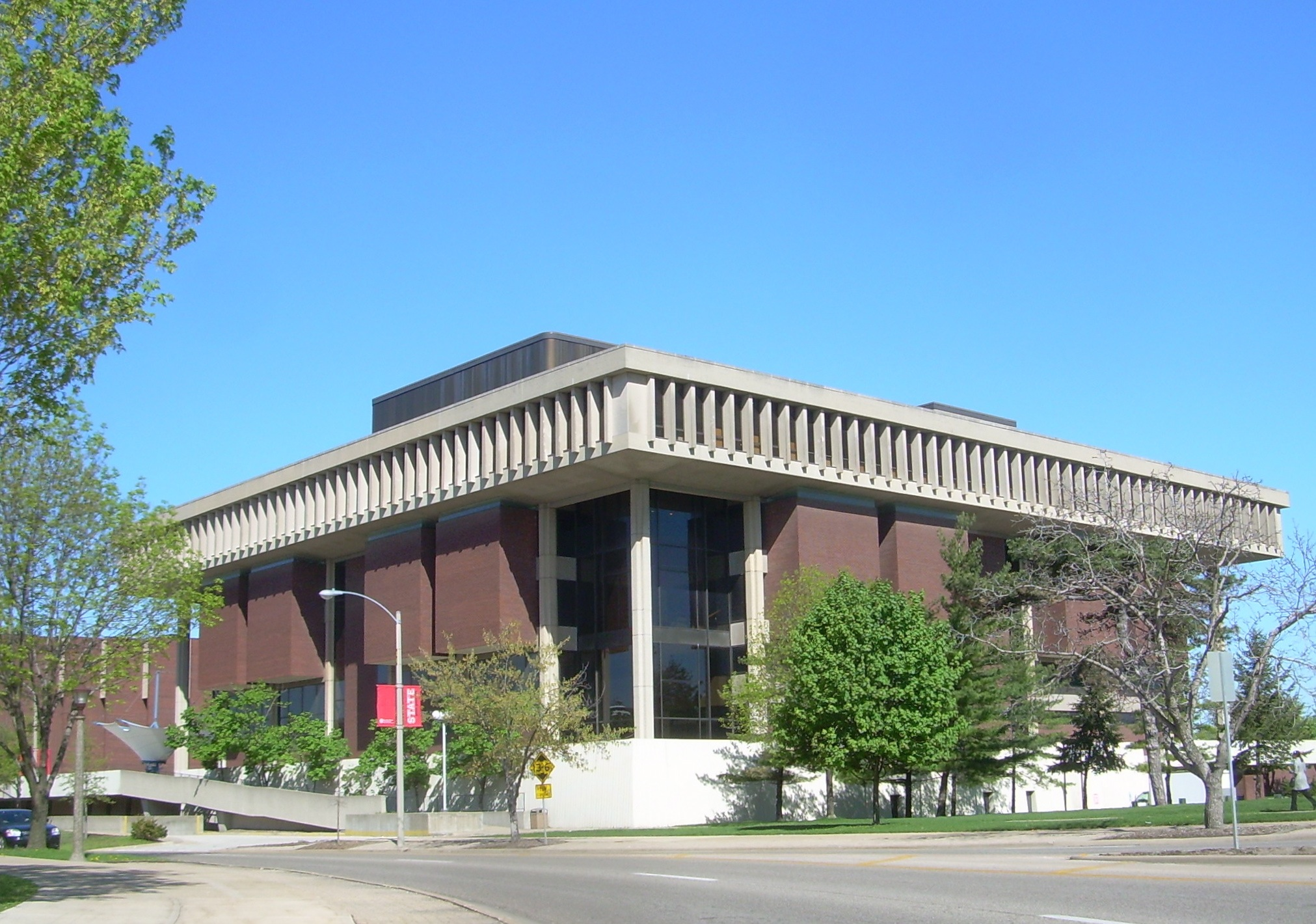
Milner Library

Milner Library has a collection of more than 1.63 million volumes and an ever-increasing number of electronic materials accessible by the Internet to students and faculty. The library's collection is distinguished by materials related to educational theory and policy, curriculum development, and issues related to special education and assistive technology. The Special Collections include extensive Circus and Allied Arts materials and a children's literature collection that features more than 100 first edition volumes signed by author Lois Lenski. Milner Library is also a selective federal depository for government information.

Milner Library administers the Jo Ann Rayfield University Archives, which houses selected official records from university departments and organizations, faculty papers, and memorabilia and ephemera on student life. The archives also hosts a branch of the Illinois Regional Archives Depository (IRAD). In addition to making physical collections available for in-person use, the Rayfield Archives has made many of the university's official publications freely available for online research use.

The Milner Library was named for Angeline "Ange" Vernon Milner (1856–1928), a Bloomington-Normal native and the first full-time librarian of Illinois State Normal University. Milner is credited with organizing the university's initial collection of more than 40,000 items and was a prolific author of more than seventy articles and short monographs in library and education journals during her tenure as University Librarian from 1890 to 1927.

The current library building, opened in 1976, is the second facility constructed to be a dedicated library. The university library has resided in five campus locations: Old Main (demolished 1958), John W. Cook Hall, North Hall (demolished 1965), Williams Hall (first known as Milner Library), and the current Milner Library.

=== Reputation and rankings ===
Academic rankings

National
- Forbes: 260
- U.S. News & World Report: 219
- Washington Monthly: 128

In the 2027 rankings, U.S. News & World Report ranked Illinois State University (tied for) 219 among a combined list of America's best 427 private and public "national universities" and (tied for) 116 among 228 public "national universities" in the United States that qualified for the list.

In 2024, Washington Monthly ranked Illinois State 128th among 438 national universities in the U.S. based on Illinois State's contribution to the public good, as measured by social mobility, research, and promoting public service.

Forbes magazine ranks Illinois State #260 out of 500 American colleges.

== Student life ==
Undergraduate demographics as of fall 2023
Race and ethnicity	Total
White	66%
Hispanic	14%
Black	12%
Two or more races	4%
Asian	3%
International student	1%
Unknown	1%
Economic diversity
Low-income (Note: The percentage of students who received an income-based federal Pell grant intended for low-income students.)	30%
Affluent (Note: The percentage of students who are a part of the American middle class at the bare minimum.)	70%

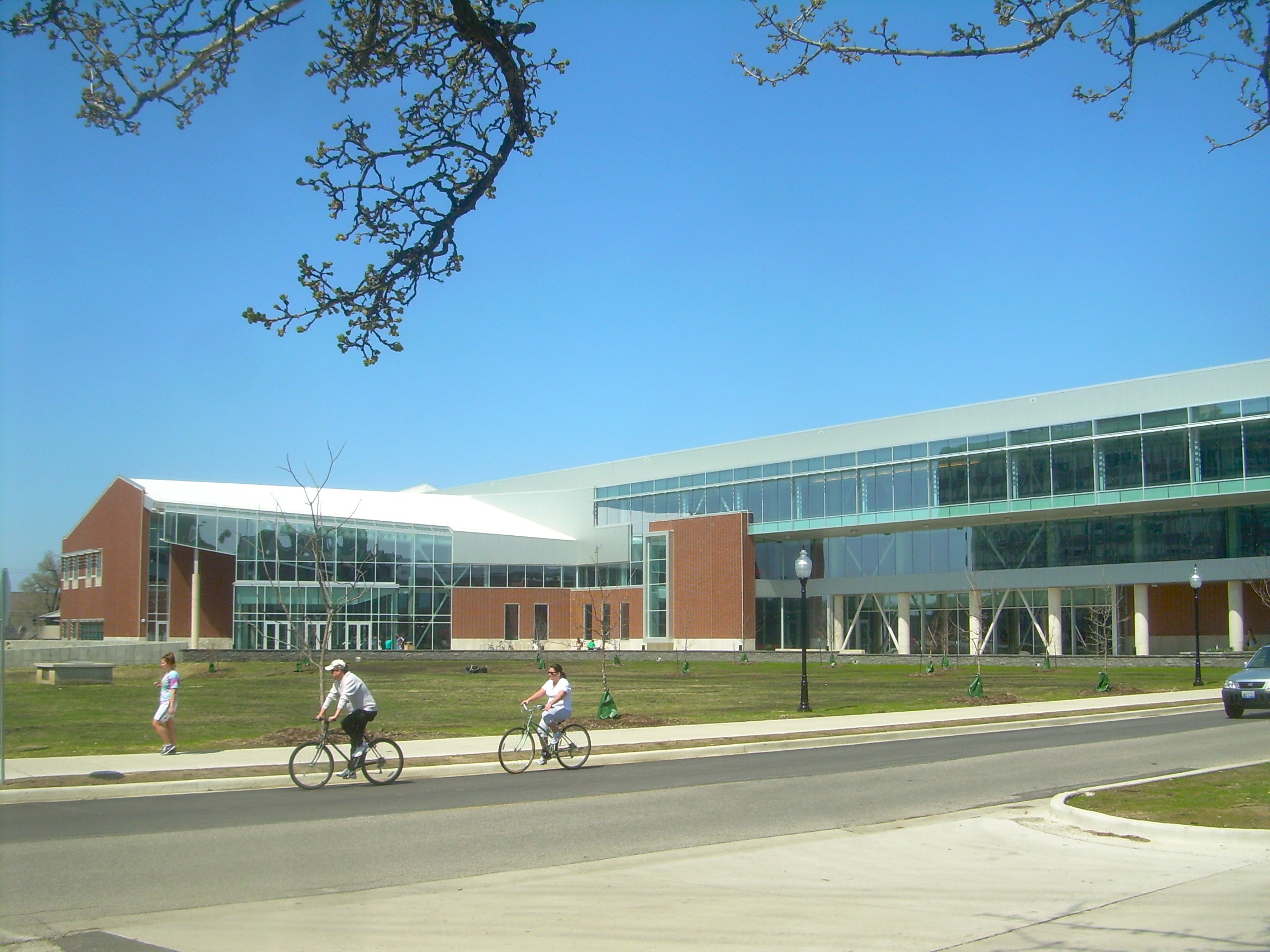
The Student Fitness Center and Kinesiology and Recreation building, completed in 2011

As of September 2024, total on-campus enrollment was 21,546, with 19,107 undergraduate students and 2,439 graduate students. The total amount of first time in college students at Illinois State University is 4,285. As of 2019 56.6 percent of students are female, while 43.4 percent are male. About 28.8% of all students were from minority groups. There are currently 613 international students. The average new freshman student had an ACT score near 24 and a grade point average of 3.6 out of 4.0.

The school newspaper, The Vidette, was first published in 1888 as a subscription-based newspaper serving both the university and Town of Normal. In 1915, the paper received funding from the university and dropped its subscription model. In 2021, The Vidette became an entirely online news source.

ISU owns a public radio station WGLT ("News, Blues and All That Jazz"), which broadcasts on 89.1 in Normal, 103.5 in Peoria, and by streaming audio. The call letters are from keywords of the school's motto: "Gladly-Learn-Teach." The university also maintains a student radio station, WZND.

=== Student organizations ===
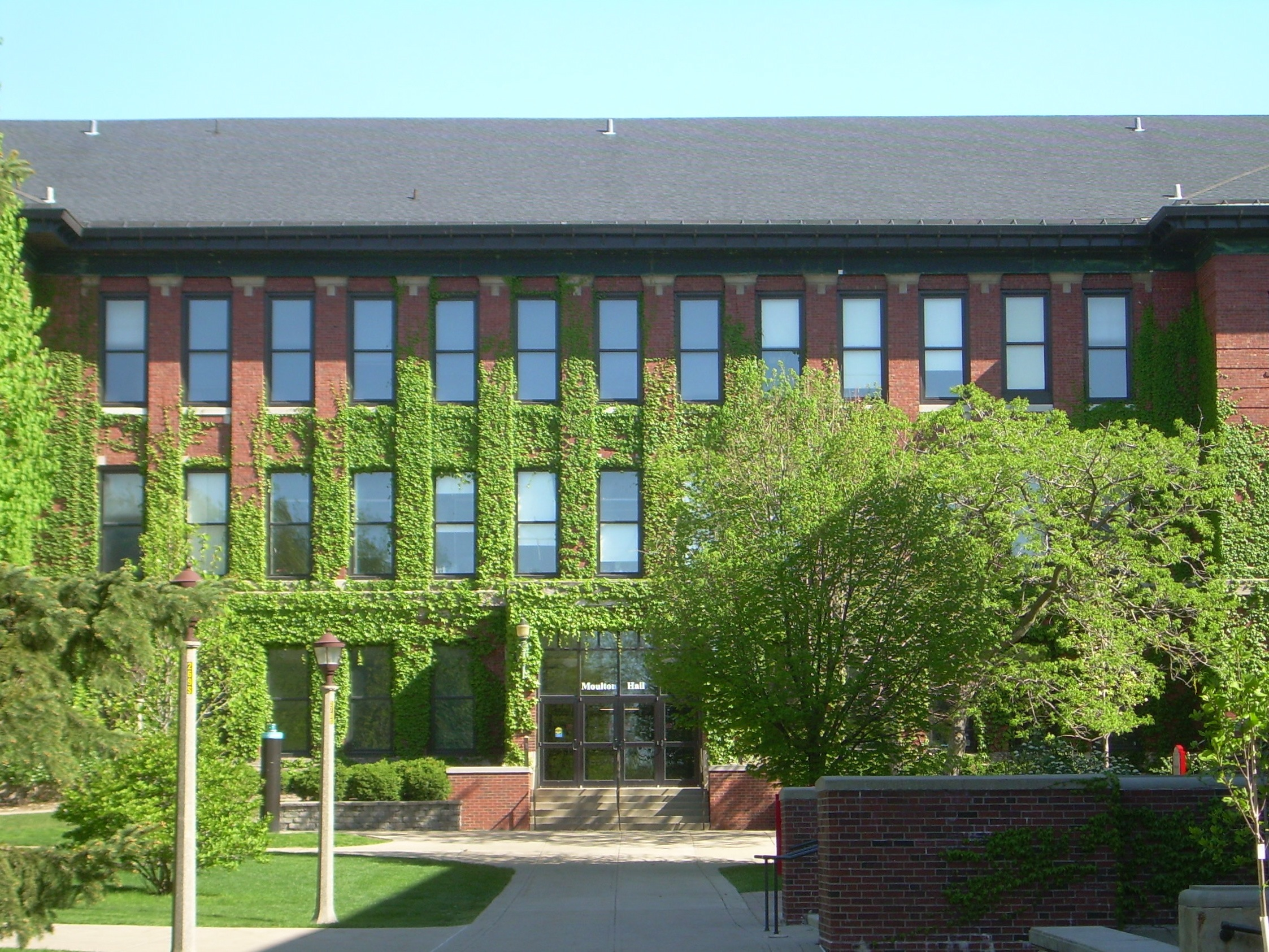
Moulton Hall

ISU has over 400 registered student organizations (RSO) and several university groups that sponsor student-focused events. The Multicultural Center is home to student diversity advocacy organizations such as the Asian Pacific American Coalition (APAC), the Association of Latin American Students (ALAS), Black Student Union (BSU), and Pride.

Illinois State University's student spirit organization, RED ALERT, has over 4,100 members, roughly one-fourth of the student body. The group was founded in 2006 to promote student involvement in university athletics.

ISU is the home of the Gamma Phi Circus, the oldest collegiate circus in the world, founded in 1929. It is one of two collegiate circuses in the US; the other is run by Florida State University.

The ISU Forensics Individual Events team is one of the most successful forensics individual events teams in the country. In 1995, 1999, and 2000 it won the National Forensic Association team championship and in 2005 its team won the American Forensic Association team championship. Illinois State was selected as the host of the 2011 NFA National Championship. Famous alumni include Nelsan Ellis of HBO's True Blood.

=== Greek life ===
The Illinois State University Greek community was established in 1967. Statistics kept by those involved claim more than 10% of the student population as active members of Greek life.

=== Folklore ===
The ghost of Angeline Vernon Milner, the university's first librarian, is said to haunt the former library building, now called Williams Hall.

== Athletics ==
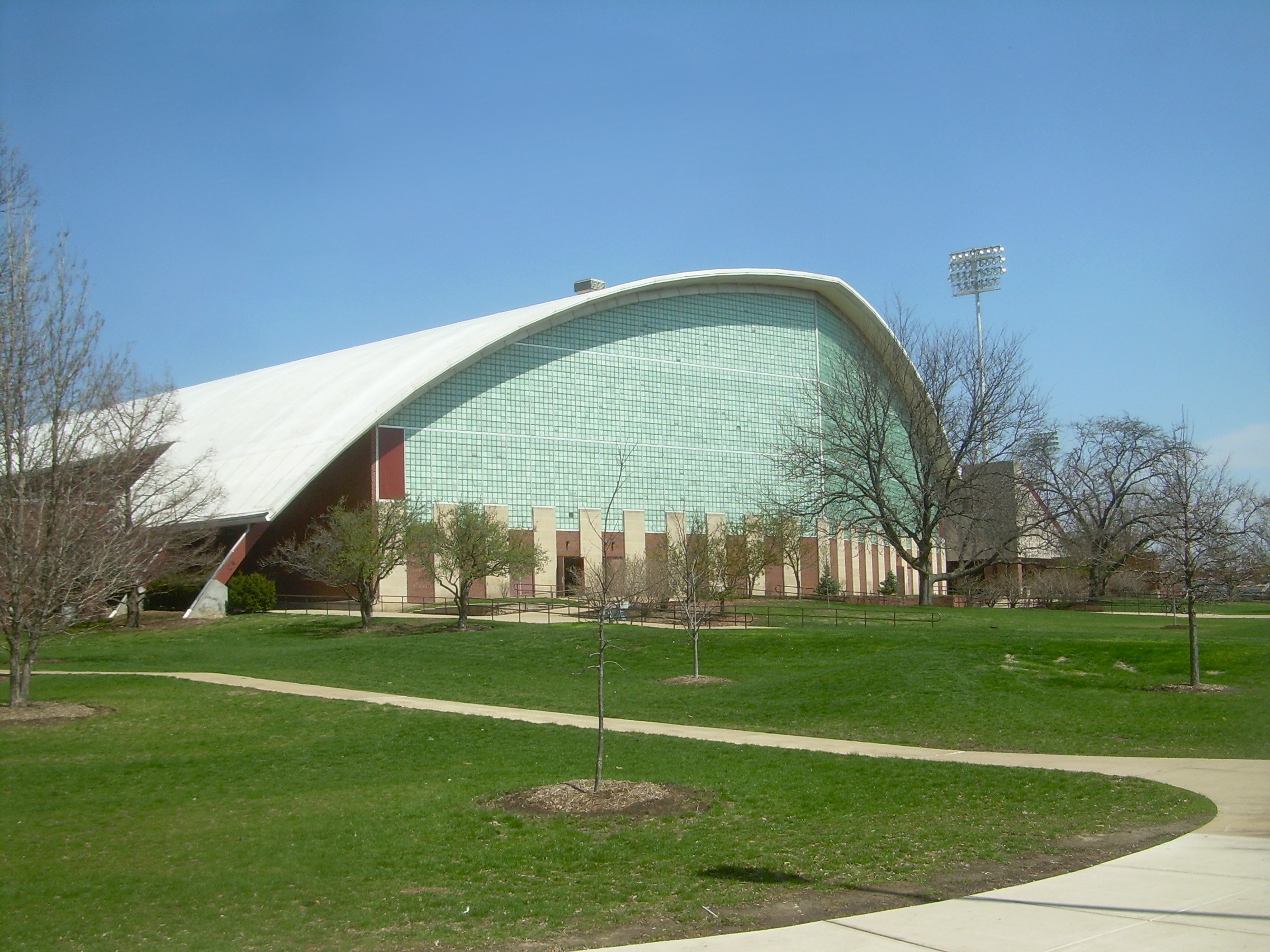
Horton Field House

The school's fight song is "Go, You Redbirds," a song written specifically for ISU and frequently played at sporting events. The alma mater, also played at sporting events from time to time, is "Glory Hast Thou," written to the tune of Haydn's "Gott erhalte Franz den Kaiser," and better known as the tune used for "Deutschlandlied," the German national anthem.

In addition to the Redbird teams linked above, the ice hockey club is the oldest registered student organization on campus. The Grossinger Motors Arena located in downtown Bloomington is home to the university's three club ice hockey teams, which compete in ACHA Divisions 1, 2, and 3.
