= The Vidette =

Student-run news organization

- The Student Voice of Illinois State University
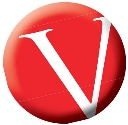
- Type: Digital
- Format: Website
- School: Illinois State University
- Owner(s): Illinois State University, School of Communication
- Editor-in-chief: Maggee Bleyer
- General manager: Kevin Capie, adviser
- News editor: Kaylee Sugimoto, Emma Snyder, Megan Spoerlein
- Opinion editor: Kellie Foy
- Photo editor: Sami Johnson
- Staff writers: 30
- Founded: 1888; 137 years ago
- Ceased publication: Final print edition published April 27, 2021
- Political alignment: Independent
- Language: English
- Headquarters: Locust and University; Normal, IL 61790; United States
- City: Normal, IL
- Country: United States
- Readership: Over a million pageviews on website annually
- OCLC number: 16854027
- Website: www.videtteonline.com
- Free online archives: videttearchive.ilstu.edu

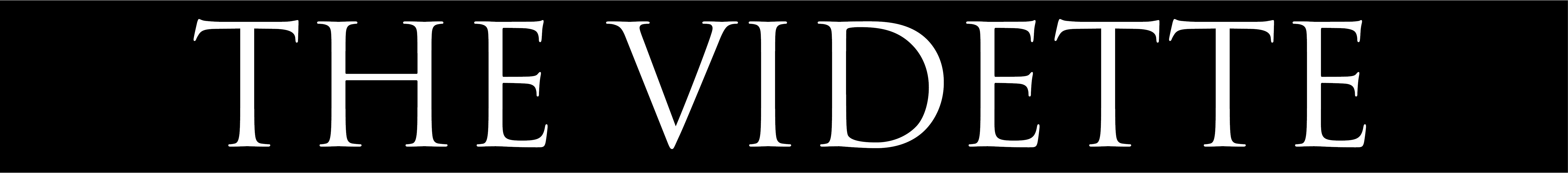
The Vidette Nameplate

The Vidette (formerly The Daily Vidette) is a fully digital student-run news organization at Illinois State University. It is an affiliate of UWIRE, which distributes and promotes the paper's content to its network.

== History ==
The Vidette was first published in 1888 and operated as a subscription publication until 1915 when it began receiving support through student fees. Publication frequency increased from weekly to semiweekly in 1934 before reverting to weekly publication in 1943. Through the 1960s and 1970s publication frequency eventually increased to five days per week. In 2013 and 2014 the newspaper reduced publication frequency to four and then two days per week. In August 2019, The Vidette became a weekly newspaper with a full-service website

Following the spring 2021 semester at Illinois State University, The Vidette will cease publishing a printed newspaper. However, it will continue as a digital news organization via its website.

== Operations ==
The Vidette covers international, national, state and local news as well as in-depth features and reviews and editorial opinions. In addition, the paper provides ISU students with professional work experience as journalists, graphic designers, web developers and media advertising sales representatives. It employs around 40 students each year and runs on a budget driven primarily through the university. The Vidette currently garners total yearly pageviews between 500,000 and 1,000,000 on average. The Vidette formerly had a circulation of 4,000 issues a day on Tuesdays during the fall and spring semesters and a digital edition published four times during the summer. In addition to the daily issue, the newspaper staff also produced four special magazine sections throughout the year on a range of topics. The Vidette had 55 drop spots around the Bloomington-Normal area.
