= Katharine Sharp =

American librarian

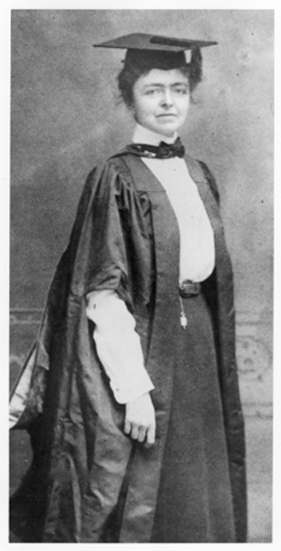
- Sharp c. 1895
- Born: May 21 or 25, 1865; Elgin, Illinois, U.S.
- Died: June 1, 1914
- Occupation: Librarian
- Known for: Prominence as a pioneering Librarian

Katharine Lucinda Sharp (May 21 or 25, 1865 – June 1, 1914) gained prominence as a pioneering librarian for her intense engagement with the library profession that spanned 19 years. Having founded the innovative University of Illinois Library School, she resigned from her position and left the library field as rapidly as she had entered it. She is remembered for 'professionalizing' the field of library science and for her considerable contribution to the standards of the discipline. In 1999, Sharp was named in the American Library Association's 100 leaders of the 20th century.

== Early life ==
Born in Elgin, Illinois, on what is variously reported to be May 21, 1865, and May 25, 1865, to John William Sharp and Phebe (Thompson) Sharp, Katharine Sharp had, by the age of 7, lost her mother. She attended the Elgin Academy, in Elgin, Illinois, from age 7 to 15, during which time she is believed to have been raised by relatives while her father attended to his various business activities, based mostly in Illinois. Laurel Grotzinger, in her comprehensive biographical work on Sharp, notes that the details of her early upbringing, as well as her later internal personal motivations, remain relatively unknown. What is known is that her father remarried in 1880, and that Katharine had a somewhat close relationship with her half-brother from this marriage, Robert Nicholson Sharp, who died suddenly at the age of 25. By 1881, Katharine Sharp was enrolled in Northwestern University, at the time the Women's College of Northwestern University.

== Education ==
Sharp received a Bachelor of Philosophy degree from Northwestern University, graduating with honors in General, Latin, and Special Scholarship. She also earned a master's degree at the same institution. As Grotzinger notes, rather than remarkable academic achievement, Sharp's time at college was distinguished by the amount of time she spent volunteering and actively participating in student clubs and organizations, such as the Ossoli Literary Society. She was one of the founding members of Kappa Kappa Gamma, a group of individuals with whom she developed lifelong relationships. This kind of involvement would be a continuing theme in her life, for, as Grotzinger aptly puts it, she was “an inveterate joiner”.

== Early career and further education ==
In 1886, Katharine Sharp returned to Elgin to teach languages at the Academy, where she remained for two years. The years 1888 to 1890 saw her employed as Assistant Librarian of the Scoville Institute's Oak Park Library. She appeared to transition to her new career with some gusto and Grotzinger speculates that it may have been her dislike of the two years of teaching at Elgin Academy that gave her an appreciation for her new career. A lifelong devotee and passionate advocate of broadening one's education, Sharp paradoxically resigned from her position at the Scoville Institute and spent 1890 to 1892 earning a Bachelor of Library Science at New York State Library School, brainchild of Melvil Dewey, and one of the first institutions to offer a comprehensive course in library studies. Aiming to better prepare herself to fulfill the duties of a librarian, she excelled at her studies and received her B.L.S. in 1892. In between fulfilling her academic obligations, she had time to 'organize' the Adams Memorial Library, in Wheaton, Illinois, in 1891, as well as providing her services at the Xenia Library in Ohio in 1892.

According to Utley, on her graduation and return to Chicago in 1892, she was thrust into the frenetic preparations for the World's Columbian Exhibition, organizing the American Library Association's comparative library exhibit. Grotzinger states that this opportunity was offered to Sharp because of Dewey, who was an integral part of the exhibit and who had hand-picked Sharp for this endeavor. Such a tremendous opportunity was not wasted on the formidable Katharine Sharp. It is unknown to what extent she relied on Dewey, but Krummel contends that he was, to her, at the very least, a “father figure” for duration of the project. Her contribution to the exhibit certainly brought her success; according to one account,

Her conspicuously excellent work, brought thus prominently to the attention of Chicago educators, resulted in her appointment as director of the newly established department of library science, opened in the fall of 1893 at the Armour Institute of Technology.

According to Krummel, when Frank Gonzales, the president of the Armour Institute, came to Melvil Dewey asking for the 'best man' to head up his new library school, Dewey famously replied: "The best man in America is a woman, and she is in the next room."

== Library science ==
Sharp served at the Armour Institute for 5 years as director of the department, during which she struggled to implement a university structure onto a technical institute. Her approach has been said to be more complementary to other library programs in the Midwest including the emerging program at the University of Wisconsin. It was also appealing to another school, and she was eventually head-hunted by Andrew Draper, president of the University of Illinois at Urbana-Champaign. The offer of a dual role as University of Illinois Head Librarian and Head of the Department of the Illinois State Library School appealed to Sharp, and in 1897, she took office in both roles.

From this formative phase of her career onward, she amassed a series of significant professional achievements, outlined in the Biography and Genealogy Master Index. From 1895 to 1896, she was the director of the University of Wisconsin summer school of library science; in both 1898 and 1907, she was the Vice President of the American Library Association; and from 1903 to 1904, she was the president of the Illinois Library Association. In 1906, she received her Master of Library Science, also from the New York State Library School.

Despite these significant later achievements, Grotzinger maintains that: "The establishment and development of a school for library training was the essential contribution of Katharine Sharp."

It is evident that Sharp constantly pushed for more stringent standards for service; for higher admission requirements to the school, and for developing a curriculum that was more than a superficial treatment of the variety of subjects encompassed by library science. To this end, she was considered revolutionary, at least by some of her former colleagues at the New York State Library School, for proposing and implementing the first four-year course in library science and the conferment of a degree. Sharp eventually wanted the degree to be a graduate program, arguing that for admission, "A baccalaureate degree should be required", and lamenting that "...a college degree today means only four years in residence, with a passing grade."

Sharp can also be credited with helping to spread library science into the Midwest, and with gaining the significant support of state bodies for library administration. Her drive to expand the library field is evident in her exhaustive work Illinois Libraries (1907). According to Grotzinger, a summation of Sharp's achievements would not be complete without also referring to her instrumentality in formulating the philosophy of the organization of libraries and library materials, and her contribution to the mobile library movement. Despite Sharp's high expectations and standards, she was also known for her generosity and she was not a pedant: "Her life was one of vigorous dedication to her work and an equally vigorous enjoyment in people and activities".

== Later years ==
Katharine Sharp's library career ended in 1907, when she resigned from her position at the University of Illinois. The new President of the university, Edmund J. James, has been said by some to believe that the main campus library needed more resources than that of the Library School itself. Sharp then became a second vice-president and executive in the Lake Placid Club in the Adirondacks, once again under the leadership of Melvil Dewey, whom some describe as her mentor and others as part of her adopted family. According to Utley, Sharp worked “actively and happily” at Lake Placid. Her abrupt withdrawal from the library field is surprising in relation to the intensity and extent of her devotion to it, but Grotzinger proposes, as an explanation, several compelling precipitating factors. The combination of the ongoing pressures of administration of both the Library and the School of Library Studies at the University of Illinois, with the usual constraints of lack of staff and insufficient budget, combined with the sudden death of her brother and father within a relatively short amount of time, may have caused Sharp to consider her need for personal fulfillment, something which she had up until then ignored, in favor of her career. In any case, she left the profession at age 42, and did not return to it for the remaining 7 years of her life. Katharine L. Sharp died suddenly in 1914. While out on an excursion with a wedding party at the Lake Placid Club, she was thrown from an automobile and suffered critical brain injuries, to which she eventually succumbed. A memorial bronze plaque, carved by sculptor Lorado Taft to Sharp, was placed in the University of Illinois Library after her death.
