= Illinois Library Association =

American library organization

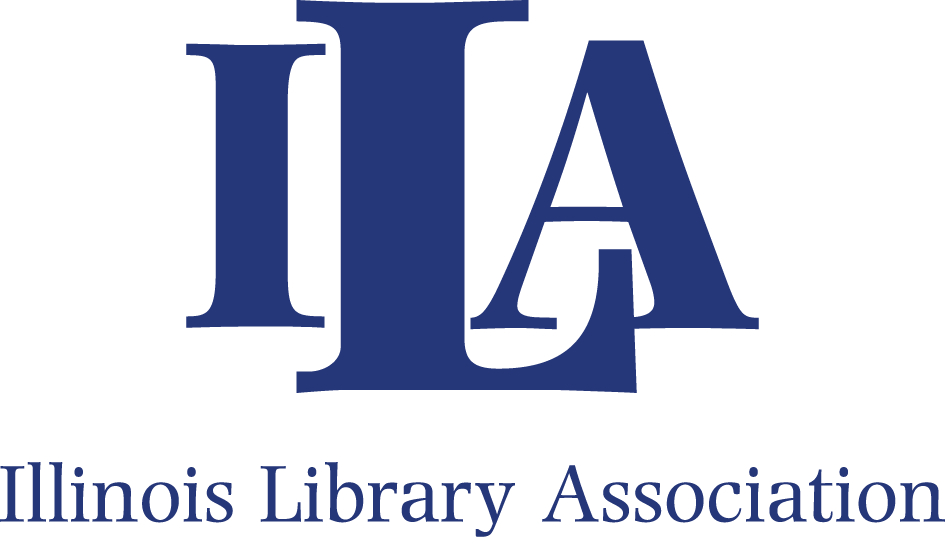
- Abbreviation: ILA
- Formation: 1896
- Headquarters: 560 W. Washington Blvd, Suite 330; Chicago, IL 60661
- Members: 3,000
- Executive Director: Cynthia Robinson
- President: Amy Byers
- Main organ: Executive Board
- Budget: $2.7 million
- Staff: 7
- Website: ila.org

The Illinois Library Association (ILA) is the eighth oldest library association in the world and the third largest state library association in the United States. It is headquartered in Chicago.

== History ==
The first meeting of what was to become the Illinois Library Association was held November 22–23, 1881. Originally called the Western Library Association (WLA), it met twice, in 1881 and again in 1884, both times in Illinois. William Frederick Poole was its first president and its avowed purpose was to promote cooperative purchasing and cataloging. The WLA ceased to exist in 1885. Ten years later, members of the Chicago Library Club proposed forming a state library association and held a meeting, in Springfield, Illinois to officially launch the Illinois Library Association.

== Membership ==
ILA membership is open to any person or organization, though most of its members are primarily librarians, library staff, and trustees. Membership represents all types of libraries in the state—public, academic, school, government, and special libraries.

== Organizational structure ==
The association has seven full-time staff members and is governed by a sixteen-member executive board, made up of elected officers.

== Activities ==
=== Library advocacy ===
Throughout the year, the Illinois Library Association monitors legislative activity at the state and national level, preparing for both challenges and opportunities. In countering legislation that restricts intellectual freedom, the profession advocates for a future of free and open access to information. The association also maintains legislative counsel in the state capital during the legislative session and works with the state library and other groups to maximize public benefit from available resources.

=== Major publications ===
The Illinois Library Association Reporter is a quarterly publication intended to explore new ideas and practices from all types of libraries and library systems; examine the challenges facing the profession; and inform the library community and its supporters with news and comment about important issues. The Reporter has been in publication since 1983 and it is indexed by EBSCO in Library & Information Science Source.

The Illinois Library Association E-Newsletter is an email newsletter intended to alert and inform the ILA membership about issues and events that are considered significant by the general media. The E-Newsletter is sent free to the ILA membership and subscribers in the general public.

In 2019, the association produced and printed Serving Our Public 4.0: Standards for Illinois Public Libraries. State law requires Illinois public libraries to "provide, as determined by the State Librarian, library services which either meet or show progress toward meeting Illinois library standards, as most recently adopted by the Illinois Library Association."

Illinois Library Laws and Rules in Effect January 2024 is a compilation of all current laws and rules affecting library service in Illinois. This publication reflects all changes to laws affecting libraries passed by the Illinois General Assembly since the previous 2020 edition. Includes an index for easy reference.

=== Reading promotion ===
Since 1982, ILA has developed iREAD, the association's summer reading program, intended to provide high quality, low-cost resources and products that enable library staff to motivate children to read.

In summer 2008, ILA successfully partnered with the Australian Library and Information Association (ALIA) to create the Summer Reading Club.

=== Conferences and events ===
ILA sponsors an annual statewide conference each fall, rotating from Chicago, to sites in suburban Chicago, and downstate Illinois.

=== Other ILA activities ===
In spring 2009, the Barack Obama Commemorative License Plate was introduced by the Illinois Department of Motor Vehicles and the Illinois Library Association. The license plate was valid for vehicle use until April 17, 2009, and has now become a popular international collector's item.

In spring 2007, the Illinois Library Association partnered with MySpace.com to produce the "CyberSafety Bookmark". One million bookmarks were distributed for free to libraries across the country, and were sold for a nominal fee afterward. They are currently sold out, but available for download.

== ILA executive directors ==
- James A. Harvey (executive secretary), 1973–75
- John R. Coyne (executive secretary), 1976–78
- Alfred L. Woods (executive secretary), 1979–80
- Judith C. Burnison, 1981–82
- Willine C. Mahony, 1983–89
- James Steenbergen (acting), 1989
- Barbara Manchak Cunningham, 1990–93
- Jane E. Getty, 1993–95
- Donna Dziedzic (interim), 1995
- Robert P. Doyle, 1996–2017
- Diane B. Foote, 2017–2022
- Cynthia Robinson, since 2022

== See also ==
- List of libraries in the United States
