= Margaret Smith =

Margaret Smith or Maggie Smith may refer to:

== Authors ==
- Margaret Bayard Smith (1778–1844), American author
- Margaret Smith (orientalist) (1884–1970), wrote Muslim Women Mystics
- Margaret Taylor Smith (active 1947–1998), American author and social activist
- Maggie Rainey-Smith (born 1950), New Zealand writer
- Margaret Smith (poet) (born 1958), American poet and artist
- Maggie Smith (poet) (born 1977), American writer

== Politicians ==
- Margaret Taylor (1788–1852), née Smith, first lady of the United States
- Margaret Chase Smith (1897–1995), United States senator from Maine
- Ann Bedsole (born Margaret Anna Smith, 1930–2025), American politician
- Margaret Smith (West Virginia politician) (born 1952), member of the West Virginia House of Delegates
- Margaret Smith (Scottish politician) (born 1961), Liberal Democrat member of the Scottish Parliament for Edinburgh West
- Maggie Smith Hathaway (1867–1955), née Smith, Montana politician
- Margaret Aldrich Smith (1863–1929), American first lady of Guam
- Margaret Smith (Illinois politician) (died 2005), American politician

== Sportspeople ==
- Margaret Smith Court, known as Margaret Court (born 1942), Australian tennis player
- Maggie Gordon-Smith (active 1968–1978), British track cyclist
- Margaret V. Martin (née Smith, born 1979), American professional female bodybuilder

== Scientists ==
- Margaret Keiver Smith (1856–1934), American psychological and educational researcher
- Margaret Gladys Smith (1896–1970), American pathologist
- Margaret Mary Smith (1916–1986), ichthyologist, fish illustrator and academic

== Other ==
- Margaret Charles Smith (1906–2004), African-American midwife
- Maggie Smith (1934–2024), British actress
- Maggie Smith (ceramist) (born 1950), American artist
- Margaret Smith (comedian) (born 1956), American standup comic, actress, writer and producer
- Margaret Dean Smith (1899–1997), English folklorist and librarian
- Margaret Smith, a character from American animated sitcom Regular Show in 2010–2017
- Margaret A. Smith, superintendent of Volusia County Schools

== Other uses ==
- MV Margaret Smith, Empire ship originally named Empire Reaper

== See also ==
- Marguerite Smith (disambiguation)
- Peggy Smith, co-founder of Cowgirl Creamery along with Sue Conley
