= Johann Friedrich Herbart =

German philosopher (1776–1841)

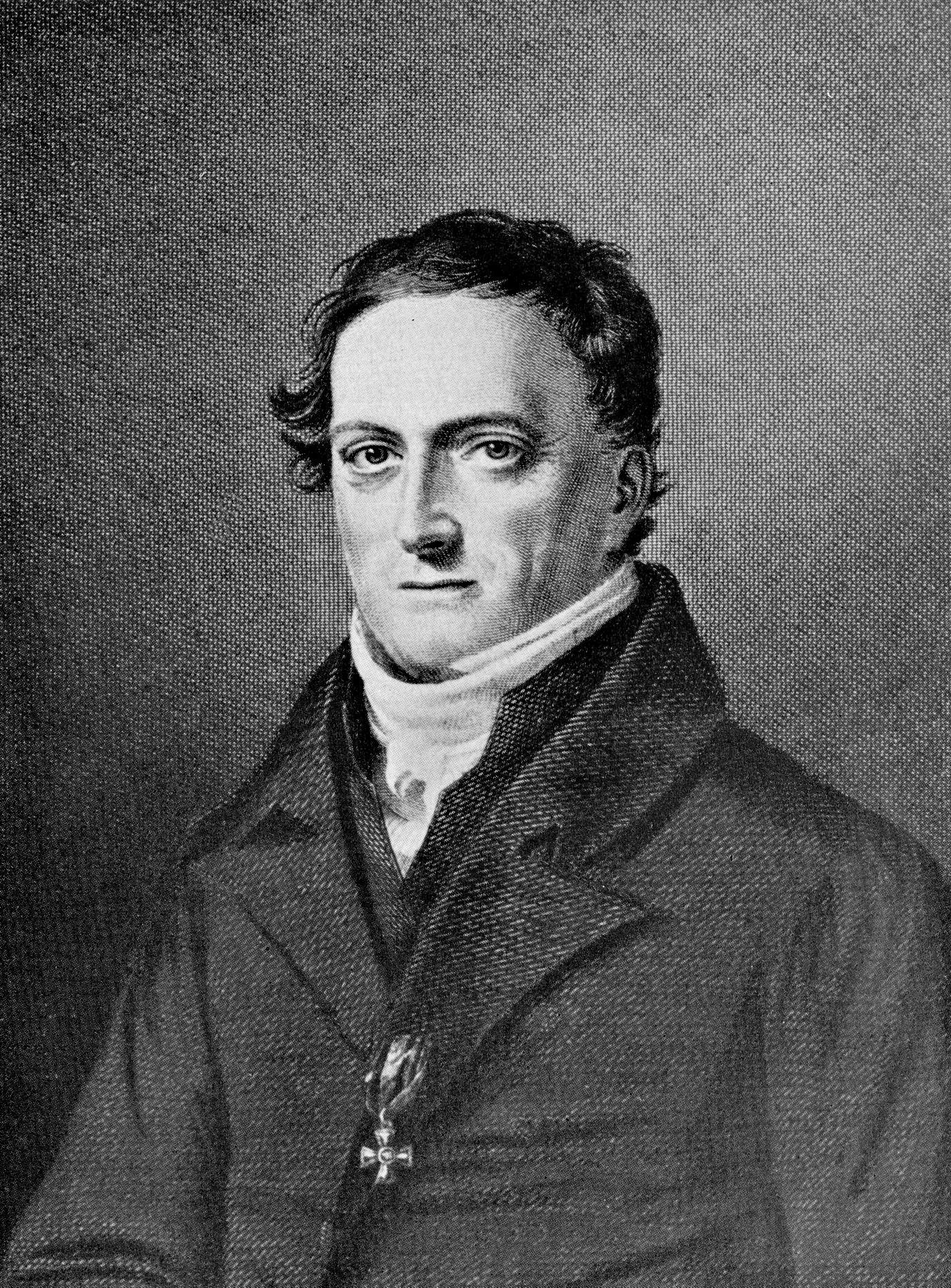
- Engraving by Conrad Geyer
- Born: 4 May 1776; Oldenburg, Duchy of Oldenburg
- Died: 14 August 1841 (aged 65); Göttingen, Kingdom of Hanover

Education
- Education: University of Jena
- Academic advisor: Johann Gottlieb Fichte

Philosophical work
- Era: 19th-century philosophy
- Region: Western philosophy
- School: Post-Kantianism; Herbartianism
- Institutions: University of Göttingen; University of Königsberg
- Main interests: Logic, metaphysics, epistemology, ethics, aesthetics
- Notable ideas: Pluralistic realism Pedagogy as an academic discipline

Johann Friedrich Herbart (German: [ˈhɛʁbaʁt]; 4 May 1776 – 14 August 1841) was a German philosopher, psychologist and founder of pedagogy as an academic discipline.

Herbart is now remembered amongst the post-Kantian philosophers mostly as making the greatest contrast to Hegel—in particular in relation to aesthetics. His educational philosophy is known as Herbartianism.

== Life ==
Herbart was born on 4 May 1776 in Oldenburg. Growing up as a fragile child because of an unfortunate accident, Herbart was taught by his mother at home until the age of 12. He continued his schooling at the Gymnasium for six years, and showed interest in philosophy, logic and Kant's work involving the nature of knowledge obtained from experience with reality. His education then continued at Jena, whereupon he studied philosophy and came to disagree with his teacher Fichte precisely because Fichte had taught him to think in a logical manner. He composed a few essays, which he had given to Fichte during his years at Jena, criticising the works of Schelling.

Leaving Jena after three years, he tutored the children of Herr von Steiger, who was the Governor of Interlaken. During these three years, his tutoring job sparked his interest in educational reform. While tutoring in Switzerland, Herbart met and came to know Pestalozzi, the Swiss educator involved with issues of reform in the schools. Resigning from his tutoring position, Herbart went on to study Greek and mathematics at Bremen for three years, and then eventually moved on to attend Göttingen from 1801 to 1809. While there, he received a privat-docent for his endeavours in educational studies after receiving his doctoral degree. He gave his first philosophical lectures at Göttingen around 1805, whence he removed in 1809 to occupy the chair formerly held by Kant at Königsberg. Here he also established and conducted a seminary of pedagogy till 1833, when he returned once more to Göttingen, and remained there as professor of philosophy till his death. Herbart gave his last lecture in perfectly good health and then unexpectedly died two days later from apoplexy. He is buried in Albanifriedhof Cemetery in Göttingen.

Herbart was very much focused on his studies, and "he barely saw the world outside his study and the classrooms" making "his world the world of books and only books". Regardless of his relentless studying, he met an eighteen-year-old English girl named Mary Drake one night when playing a game of charades. He became acquainted with her and asked her for her hand in marriage. They lived a happy life with Mary supporting all of her husband's pursuits and contributions to the fields of pedagogy and psychology.

== Philosophy ==
Philosophy, according to Herbart, begins with reflection upon our empirical conceptions, and consists in the reformation and elaboration of these, its three primary divisions being determined by as many distinct forms of elaboration. Logic, which stands first, has to render our conceptions and the judgments and reasonings arising from them clear and distinct. But some conceptions are such that the more distinct they are made the more contradictory their elements become; so to change and supplement these as to make them at length thinkable is the problem of the second part of philosophy, or metaphysics. There is still a class of conceptions requiring more than a logical treatment, but differing from the last in not involving latent contradictions, and in being independent of the reality of their objects, the conceptions that embody our judgments of approval and disapproval; the philosophic treatment of these conceptions falls under aesthetics.

=== Logic ===
In Herbart's writings logic receives comparatively meagre notice; he insisted strongly on its purely formal character and expressed himself in the main at one with Kantians such as Fries and Krug.

=== Metaphysics ===
As a metaphysician, he starts from what he terms the higher scepticism of the Humean–Kantian sphere of thought, the beginnings of which he discerns in Locke's perplexity about the idea of substance. The validity of even the forms of experience is called in question on account of the contradictions they are found to involve. And yet that these forms are given to us, as truly as sensations are, follows beyond doubt when we consider that we are as little able to control the one as the other. To attempt at this stage a psychological inquiry into the origin of these conceptions would be doubly a mistake; for we should have to use these illegitimate conceptions in the course of it, and the task of clearing up their contradictions would still remain, whether we succeeded in our enquiry or not.

But how are we to set about this task? We have given to us a conception A uniting among its constituent marks two that prove to be contradictory, say M and N; and we can neither deny the unity nor reject one of the contradictory members. For to do either is forbidden by experience; and yet to do nothing is forbidden by logic. We are thus driven to the assumption that the conception is contradictory because incomplete; but how are we to supplement it? What we have must point the way to what we want, or our procedure will be arbitrary. Experience asserts that M is the same (i.e. a mark of the same concept) as N, while logic denies it; and so it being impossible for one and the same M to sustain these contradictory positions there is but one way open to us; we must posit several Ms. But even now we cannot say one of these Ms is the same as N, another is not; for every M must be both thinkable and valid. We may, however, take the Ms not singly but together; and again, no other course being open to us, this is what we must do; we must assume that N results from a combination of Ms. This is Herbart's method of relations, the counterpart in his system of the Hegelian dialectic.

In ontology, this method is employed to determine what in reality corresponds to the empirical conceptions of substance and cause, or rather of inherence and change. But first we must analyse this notion of reality itself, to which our scepticism had already led us, for, though we could doubt whether the given is what it appears, we cannot doubt that it is something; the conception of the real thus consists of the two conceptions of being and quality. That which we are compelled to posit, which cannot be sublated, is that which is, and in the recognition of this lies the simple conception of being. But when is a thing thus posited? When it is posited as we usually posit the things we see and taste and handle. If we were without sensations, i.e. were never bound against our will to endure the persistence of a presentation, we should never know what being is.

Keeping fast hold of this idea of absolute position, Herbart leads us next to the quality of the real:

1. This must exclude everything negative; for non-A sublates instead of positing, and is not absolute, but relative to A.
2. The real must be absolutely simple; for if it contain two determinations, A and B, then either these are reducible to one, which is the true quality, or they are not, when each is conditioned by the other and their position is no longer absolute.
3. All quantitative conceptions are excluded, for quantity implies parts, and these are incompatible with simplicity.
4. But there may be a plurality of reals, albeit the mere conception of being can tell us nothing as to this.

The doctrine here developed is the first cardinal point of Herbart's system, and the name pluralistic realism has been proposed for it by Otto Pfleiderer.

The contradictions he finds in the common-sense conception of inherence, or of a thing with several attributes, will now become obvious. Take some thing, say A, having n attributes, a, b, c ...: we are forced to posit each of these because each is presented in intuition. But in conceiving A we make, not n positions, still less n+1 positions, but one position simply; for common sense removes the absolute position from its original source, sensation. So when we ask, What is the one posited? we are told the possessor of a, b, c or in other words, their seat or substance. But if so, then A, as a real, being simple, must be equal to a; similarly it must be b; and so on.

Now this would be possible if a, b, c ... were only contingent aspects of A, as for example 2^{3}, √64, 4+3+1 are contingent aspects of 8. Such, of course, is not the case, and so we have as many contradictions as there are attributes; for we must say A is a, is not a, is b, is not b, etc. There must then, according to the method of relations, be several As. For a let us assume A_{1}+A_{1}+A_{1} ... ; for b, A_{2}+A_{2}+A_{2} ...; and so on for the rest. But now what relation can there be among these several As, which will restore to us the unity of our original A or substance? There is just one; we must assume that the first A of every series is identical, just as the centre is the same point in every radius.

By way of concrete illustration Herbart instances "the common observation that the properties of things exist only under external conditions. Bodies, we say, are coloured, but color is nothing without light, and nothing without eyes. They sound, but only in a vibrating medium, and for healthy ears. Colour and tone present the appearance of inherence, but on looking closer we find they are not really immanent in things but rather presuppose a communion among several." The result then is briefly thus: In place of the one absolute position, which in some unthinkable way the common understanding substitutes for the absolute positions of the n attributes, we have really a series of two or more positions for each attribute, every series, however, beginning with the same (as it were, central) real (hence the unity of substance in a group of attributes), but each being continued by different reals (hence the plurality and difference of attributes in unity of substance). Where there is the appearance of inherence, therefore, there is always a plurality of reals; no such correlative to substance as attribute or accident can be admitted at all. Substantiality is impossible without causality, and to this as its true correlative we now turn.

The common-sense conception of change involves at bottom the same contradiction of opposing qualities in one real. The same A that was a, b, c ... becomes a, b, d ...; and this, which experience thrusts upon us, proves on reflection unthinkable. The metaphysical supplementing is also fundamentally as before. Since c depended on a series of reals A_{3}+A_{3}+A_{3} ... in connection with A, and d may be said similarly to depend on a series A_{4}+A_{4}+A_{4} ..., then the change from c to d means, not that the central real A or any real has changed, but that A is now in connection with A_{4}, etc., and no longer in connection with A_{3}, etc.

But to think a number of reals in connection (Zusammensein) will not suffice as an explanation of phenomena; something or other must happen when they are in connection; what is it? The answer to this question is the second hinge-point of Herbart's theoretical philosophy.

What actually happens as distinct from all that seems to happen, when two reals A and B are together is that, assuming them to differ in quality, they tend to disturb each other to the extent of that difference, at the same time that each preserves itself intact by resisting, as it were, the others disturbance. And so by coining into connection with different reals the self-preservations of A will vary accordingly, A remaining the same through all; just as, by way of illustration, hydrogen remains the same in water and in ammonia, or as the same line may be now a normal and now a tangent. But to indicate this opposition in the qualities of the reals A+B, we must substitute for these symbols others, which, though only contingent aspects of A and B, i.e. representing their relations, not themselves, yet like similar devices in mathematics enable thought to advance. Thus we may put A = α+β-γ, B = m+n+γ; γ then represents the character of the self-preservations in this case, and α+β+m+n represents all that could be observed by a spectator who did not know the simple qualities, but was himself involved in the relations of A to B; and such is exactly our position.

Having thus determined what really is and what actually happens, our philosopher proceeds next to explain synthetically the objective semblance (der objective Schein) that results from these. But if this construction is to be truly objective, i.e. valid for all intelligences, ontology must furnish us with a clue. This we have in the forms of Space, Time and Motion which are involved whenever we think the reals as being in, or coming into, connection and the opposite. These forms then cannot be merely the products of our psychological mechanism, though they may turn out to coincide with these. Meanwhile, let us call them intelligible, as being valid for all who comprehend the real and actual by thought, although no such forms are predicable of the real and actual themselves.

The elementary spatial relation Herbart conceives to be "the contiguity (Aneinander) of two points," so that every "pure and independent line" is discrete. But an investigation of dependent lines which are often incommensurable forces us to adopt the contradictory fiction of partially overlapping, i.e. divisible points, or in other words, the conception of Continuity. (Note: Hence Herbart gave the name synechology to this branch of metaphysics, instead of the usual one, cosmology.) But the contradiction here is one we cannot eliminate by the method of relations, because it does not involve anything real; and in fact as a necessary outcome of an intelligible form, the fiction of continuity is valid for the objective semblance. By its help we are enabled to comprehend what actually happens among reals to produce the appearance of water. When three or more reals are together, each disturbance and self-preservation will (in general) be imperfect, i.e. of less intensity than when only two reals are together. But objective semblance corresponds with reality; the spatial or external relations of the reals in this case must, therefore, tally with their inner or actual states. Had the self-preservations been perfect, the coincidence in space would have been complete, and the group of reals would have been inextended; or had the several reals been simply contiguous, i.e. without connection, then, as nothing would actually have happened, nothing would appear. As it is we shall find a continuous molecule manifesting attractive and repulsive forces; attraction corresponding to the tendency of the self-preservations to become perfect, repulsion to the frustration of this. Motion, even more evidently than space, implicates the contradictory conception of continuity and cannot, therefore, be a real predicate, though valid as an intelligible form and necessary to the comprehension of the objective semblance. For we have to think of the reals as absolutely independent and yet as entering into connections. This we can only do by conceiving them as originally moving through intelligible space in rectilinear paths and with uniform velocities. For such motion no cause need be supposed; motion, in fact, is no more a state of the moving real than rest is, both alike being but relations, with which, therefore, the real has no concern. The changes in this motion, however, for which we should require a cause, would be the objective semblance of the self-preservations that actually occur when reals meet. Further, by means of such motion these actual occurrences, which are in themselves timeless, fall for an observer in a definite time — a time which becomes continuous through the partial coincidence of events.

But in all this it has been assumed that we are spectators of the objective semblance; it remains to make good this assumption, or, in other words, to show the possibility of knowledge; this is the problem of what Herbart terms Eidolology, and forms the transition from metaphysic to psychology. Here, again, a contradictory conception blocks the way, that, viz. of the Ego as the identity of knowing and being, and as such the stronghold of idealism. The contradiction becomes more evident when the ego is defined to be a subject (and so a real) that is its own object. As real and not merely formal, this conception of the ego is amenable to the method of relations. The solution this method furnishes is summarily that there are several objects which mutually modify each other, and so constitute that ego we take for the presented real. But to explain this modification is the business of psychology; it is enough now to see that the subject like all reals is necessarily unknown and that, therefore, the idealist's theory of knowledge is unsound. But though the simple quality of the subject or soul is beyond knowledge, we know what actually happens when it is in connection with other's reals, for its self-preservations then are what we call sensations. And these sensations are the sole material of our knowledge; but they are not given to us as a chaos but in definite groups and series, whence we come to know the relations of those reals, which, though themselves unknown, our sensations compel us to posit absolutely.

=== Principles of education ===
Herbart's pedagogy emphasised the connection between individual development and the resulting societal contribution. In Platonic tradition, Herbart espoused that only by becoming productive citizens could people fulfill their true purpose: "He believed that every child is born with a unique potential, his Individuality, but that this potential remained unfulfilled until it was analysed and transformed by education in accordance with what he regarded as the accumulated values of civilisation". Only formalised, rigorous education could, he believed, provide the framework for moral and intellectual development. The five key ideas which composed his concept of individual maturation were Inner Freedom, Perfection, Benevolence, Justice and Equity or Recompense.

According to Herbart, abilities were not innate but could be instilled, so a thorough education could provide the framework for moral and intellectual development. In order to develop an educational paradigm that would provide an intellectual base that would lead to a consciousness of social responsibility, Herbart advocated that teachers utilise a methodology with five formal steps: "Using this structure a teacher prepared a topic of interest to the children, presented that topic, and questioned them inductively, so that they reached new knowledge based on what they had already known, looked back and deductively summed up the lesson's achievements, then related them to moral precepts for daily living".

In order to appeal to learners' interests, Herbart advocated using literature and historical stories instead of the drier basal readers that were popular at the time. Whereas the moralistic tales in many of the primers and readers of the period were predictable and allegorical, Herbart felt that children would appreciate the psychological and literary nuances of the masterpieces of the canon.

Though he died in 1841, his pedagogy enjoyed a renaissance of sorts in the mid-19th century; while Germany was its intellectual centre, it "found a ready echo in those countries such as the United Kingdom, France, and the United States in which the development of Individuality into Character appeared particularly well attuned to the prevailing economic, political and social circumstances." Among those who espoused and advocated his ideas in the United Kingdom was Catherine Isabella Dodd. The combination of individual potentiality and civic responsibility seemed to reflect democratic ideals.

Though the emphasis on character building through literary appreciation diminished somewhat after the movement toward utilitarianism following the First World War, Herbart's pedagogy continues to influence the field by raising important questions about the role of critical thinking, and literary appreciation in education.

=== Aesthetics and ethics ===
Aesthetics elaborates the ideas involved in the expression called forth by those relations of object which acquire for them attribution of beauty or the reverse. The beautiful is to be carefully distinguished from the allied conceptions of the useful or the pleasant, which vary with time, place and person; whereas beauty is predicated absolutely and involuntarily by all who have attained the right standpoint. Ethics, which is but one branch of aesthetics, although the chief, deals with such relations among volitions (Willensverhältnisse) as thus unconditionally please or displease. These relations Herbart finds to be reducible to five, which do admit of further simplification; and corresponding to them are as many moral ideas (Musterbegriffe), as follows:

1. Internal Freedom, the underlying relation being that of the individual's will to his judgment of it
2. Perfection, the relation being that of his several volitions each other in respect of intensity, variety and concentration
3. Benevolence, the relation being that between his own will and the thought of another's
4. Right, in case of actual conflict with other
5. Retribution or Equity, for intended good or evil

The ideas of a final society, a system of rewards and punishments, a system of administration, a system of culture and an animated society, corresponding to the ideas of law, equity, benevolence, perfection and internal freedom respectively, result when we take account of a number of individuals. Virtue is the perfect conformity of the will with the moral ideas; of this the single virtues are but special expressions. The conception of duty arises from the existence of hindrances to the attainment of virtue. A general scheme of principles of conduct is possible, but the sublimation of special cases under these must remain matter of fact. The application of ethics to things as they are with a view to the realisation of the moral ideas is moral technology (Tugendlehre), which the chief divisions are Paedagogy and Politics.

=== Theology ===
In theology, Herbart held the argument from design to be as valid of divine activity as for human, and to justify the belief in a supersensible real, concerning which, however, exact knowledge is neither tenable nor on practical grounds desirable.

== Psychology ==
=== Herbart's concept of the Real ===
Building upon the teaching methods of Pestalozzi, Herbart contributed to pedagogy a psychological basis to help facilitate better learning as well as to ensure children's character development. He was the first individual to point out how important a role psychology plays on education. In developing his ideas about psychology, Herbart came to disagree with Kant about how true knowledge is obtained. Kant believed that we become knowledgeable through studying the innate categories of thought, while Herbart believed that one learns only from studying external and real objects in the world as well as the ideas that come about from observing them. Examining the difference between the actual existence of an object and its appearance, Herbart concluded that "the world is a world of things-in-themselves [and] the things-in-themselves are perceivable". Everything's appearance indicates that it exists. He considered all external objects existing in the world as reals, which can be compared to Leibniz's concept of monads.

Subscribing to Locke's empiricist viewpoint involving the tabula rasa, Herbart believed that the soul had no innate ideas or no already pre-established Kantian categories of thought. The soul, considered to be a real, was thought to be completely passive initially as well as very resistant to changes outside factors exert and force upon it. Even though reals are disrupted by other forces appearing to cause a change in the reals themselves, they are thought to be unchangeable. Reals tend to collide and struggle with one another so much so that each real fights for its own self-preservation (Selbsterhaltung). The way in which the soul helps to preserve itself from its outwardly perceived destruction is through Herbart's concept of Vorstellungen, or ideas or mental representations. These ideas were regarded as dynamic forces that Herbart attempted to explain by means of mathematical formulas. Newton's influence can be seen in Herbart's beliefs about how forces mechanically interact with one another in the world to affect perceptions of reality. The mechanics of ideas involved their ability to move in different ways, whether they be moving up into the conscious or delving down into the unconscious. Different ideas come into contact with each other and result in more complex ideas through the processes of blending, fusing, fading and combining in a multitude of approaches. It is evident Herbart thought that ideas were not precise imitations of the existing items in the world but that they were the direct consequence of the interactions of individuals' experiences with the external environment. An individual can gain all the facts and their associated truth only by understanding how their mental representations combine and potentially inhibit or contribute to one another.

=== Apperception ===
Herbart believed ideas crossed a limen of consciousness, or a boundary between the conscious and the unconscious, as they became clearer and strong enough to preserve themselves against their struggle with other forces. The ideas powerful enough to break through to the conscious formed the apperceiving mass, or a congregation of similar and related ideas dominating the conscious at any given moment. Expounding upon Leibniz's concept of petites perceptions and the idea of apperception, Herbart believed the apperceiving mass to be crucial in selecting similar ideas from down in the unconscious to join its forces in the conscious. Although the individual is focusing all of his/her attention on those complex ideas a part of the apperceiving mass in the conscious, it is possible for ideas in the unconscious to combine with other ideas related to them and struggle to break through the limen into the conscious, disrupting the present ideas a part of the apperceiving mass. Apperception played a key role in Herbart's educational theory. He saw apperception as more pivotal in the classroom than sense-perception, because focusing on a child's apperceiving mass in relation to the material being taught can inform teachers of how to implement the material in such a way as to direct the child's ideas and thoughts to attend to certain information.

== Biographies ==
There is a life of Herbart in Hartenstein's introduction to his Kleinere philosophische Schriften und Abhandlungen (1842–1843) and by F. H. T. Allihn in Zeitschrift für exacte Philosophie (Leipzig, 1861), the organ of Herbart and his school, which ceased to appear in 1873. In America the National Society for the Scientific Study of Education was founded as the National Herbart Society.

== Selected publications ==
Herbart's works were collected and published by his disciple G. Hartenstein (Leipzig, 1850–1852; reprinted at Hamburg, with supplementary volume, 1883–1893); another edition by Karl Kehrbach (Leipzig, 1882, and Langensalza, 1887).

The following are the most important:

- Allgemeine Pädagogik (1806; new ed., 1894)
- Hauptpunkte der Metaphysik (1808)
- Allgemeine praktische Philosophie (1808)
- Lehrbuch zur Einleitung in die Philosophie (1813; new ed. by Hartenstein, 1883)
- Lehrbuch der Psychologie (1816; new ed. by Hartenstein, 1887)
- Psychologie als Wissenschaft (1824–25)
- Allgemeine Metaphysik (1828–29)
- Encyklopädie der Philosophie (2nd ed., 1841)
- Umriss pädagogischer Vorlesungen (2nd ed., 1841)
- Psychologische Untersuchungen (1839–40)

Some of his works have been translated into English under the following titles:

- Textbook in Psychology, by Margaret Keiver Smith (1891)
- The Science of Education and the Aesthetic Revelation of the World (1892) and Letters and Lectures on Education (1898), by H. M. and E. Felkin
- ABC of Sense Perception and minor pedagogical works (New York, 1896), by W. J. Eckhoff and others
- Application of Psychology to the Science of Education (1898), by B. C. Mulliner
- Outlines of Educational Doctrine, translated by Alexis F. Lange, annotated by Charles De Garmo (1901)
- Introductory Lecture to Students in Pedagogy In Friesen, N. (ed.). Tact and the pedagogical relation: Introductory readings. New York: Peter Lang.

== See also ==
- Moritz Wilhelm Drobisch
- Neo-Kantianism
