= David Moulton =

American lawyer and conservationist

- Born: September 16, 1871; Falmouth, Maine, U.S.
- Died: April 21, 1951 (aged 79); Falmouth, Maine, U.S.
- Resting place: Evergreen Cemetery, Portland, Maine, U.S.
- Occupations: Attorney, conservationist
- Spouse(s): Etta Knight (m. 1901–1911; her death); Helen Leavitt (m. 1918–1951; his death)

David Edward Moulton (September 16, 1871 – April 21, 1951) was an American attorney and conservationist. He established Gilsland Farm in Falmouth, Maine, which is now owned by the Maine Audubon.

== Early life ==
Moulton was born in Falmouth, Maine, in 1871 to David Moulton Sr. and Mehitable Perry Wormwood. He was their middle child of three, between brother Willis and sister Margaret.

== Career ==
In 1911, with his brother, Moulton purchased the land in coastal Falmouth. Moulton named the land Gilsland, after his relative, Sir Thomas de Moulton, who was named "Thom of the Gils" by his friend Richard I. (A gils is a narrow, wooden glen in old English.) It was during this ownership that the property was the home of over 400 species of peonies.

In 1908, Moulton was a founder of Portland Water District, upon its purchase of Portland Water Company and the Standish Water and Construction Company.

== Personal life ==
In 1901, Moulton wed Etta Knight. She died ten years into their marriage, aged 46. They had two children together: Ruth and Louise. He remarried, in 1918, to Helen Leavitt. It was her second marriage, after the death of her first husband, Captain Joseph Bancroft II, in 1938. Moulton became stepfather to Lelia Agry Bancroft.

Moulton lost both of his parents, about a month apart, in the summer of 1920. His brother died in 1938; his sister in 1949.

== Death ==
Moulton died in 1951, aged 79. He was interred in Portland's Evergreen Cemetery, beside his first wife. Around two decades later, his daughter, Ruth, began donating parts of the farm to Maine Audubon, which now owns 65 acres (26 ha). Maine Audubon purchased the farmhouse in 1981.

Moulton's widow, Helen, survived him by 17 years. She was interred with her first husband in Evergreen Cemetery.
