= Marguerite Smith =

Marguerite Smith may refer to:

- Marguerite H. Smith (fl. from 1957), state legislator in Maine, U.S.
- Marguerite L. Smith (1894–1985), American politician from New York
- Marguerite Smith (died 1959), suffragist, associate of Alma Lutz
