= Falmouth (CDP), Maine =

Falmouth, Maine
- Census-designated place
- Location in Cumberland County and the state of Maine
- Coordinates: 43°42′23″N 70°14′31″W
- Country: United States
- State: Maine
- County: Cumberland
- Town: Falmouth

Area
  - Total: 3.15 sq mi (8.16 km^{2})
  - Land: 2.40 sq mi (6.22 km^{2})
  - Water: 0.75 sq mi (1.93 km^{2})
- Elevation: 23 ft (7.0 m)

Population (2020)
  - Total: 1,988
  - Density: 827.3/sq mi (319.43/km^{2})
- Time zone: UTC-5 (Eastern (EST))
  - Summer (DST): UTC-4 (EDT)
- ZIP Code: 04105
- Area code: 207
- FIPS code: 23-24480
- GNIS feature ID: 2583557

Falmouth is a census-designated place (CDP) within the town of Falmouth in Cumberland County, Maine, United States. The population was 1,855 at the 2010 census. It is part of the Portland–South Portland–Biddeford, Maine Metropolitan Statistical Area.

== Geography ==
According to the United States Census Bureau, the CDP has a total area of 3.3 square miles (8.5 km^{2}), of which 2.4 square miles (6.3 km^{2}) is land and 0.81 square miles (2.1 km^{2}), or 25.02%, is water.

The Falmouth CDP is centered along U.S. Route 1 in the southeastern part of the town of Falmouth, and is bordered to the north by the CDP of Falmouth Foreside, to the east by Casco Bay, to the south by the city of Portland, and to the west by the tidal arm of the Presumpscot River and by Interstate 295.

== Demographics ==
Historical population
Census	Pop.	Note	%±
2020	1,988		—
U.S. Decennial Census
