= Gilsland Farm =

Building in Falmouth, Maine, United States

- Location within Maine
- Town/City: Falmouth
- State: Maine
- Country: United States
- Coordinates: 43.70604°N 70.24093°W
- Established: c. 1820 (206 years ago)
- Owner: Maine Audubon (since 1974)
- Area: 65 acres (260,000 m^{2})
- Status: Open to the public

Gilsland Farm is a historic property in Falmouth, Maine, United States. In the early 19th century, Silas Noyes built a home on the land, formerly the home of the Wabanakis, a few yards from the eastern banks of the Presumpscot River. The home still stands today, now owned by Maine Audubon. It is known as the Gilsland Farm Audubon Center.

== History ==
Silas Noyes (1796–1874) constructed a home at the start of today's Gilsland Farm Road, near a section of Old U.S. Route 1, in the early 1800s. Around a century later, in 1911, attorney and conservationist David Moulton (1871–1951) and his brother, Willis (1862–1938), bought the land.

Moulton named the land Gilsland, after his relative, Sir Thomas de Moulton, who was named "Thom of the Gils" by his friend Richard I. (A gils is a narrow, wooden glen in old English.) It was during this ownership that the property was the home of over 400 species of peonies. Moulton died in 1951, and around two decades later his daughter, Ruth, began donating parts of the farm to Maine Audubon, which now owns 65 acres (26 ha). Maine Audubon purchased the farmhouse in 1981.

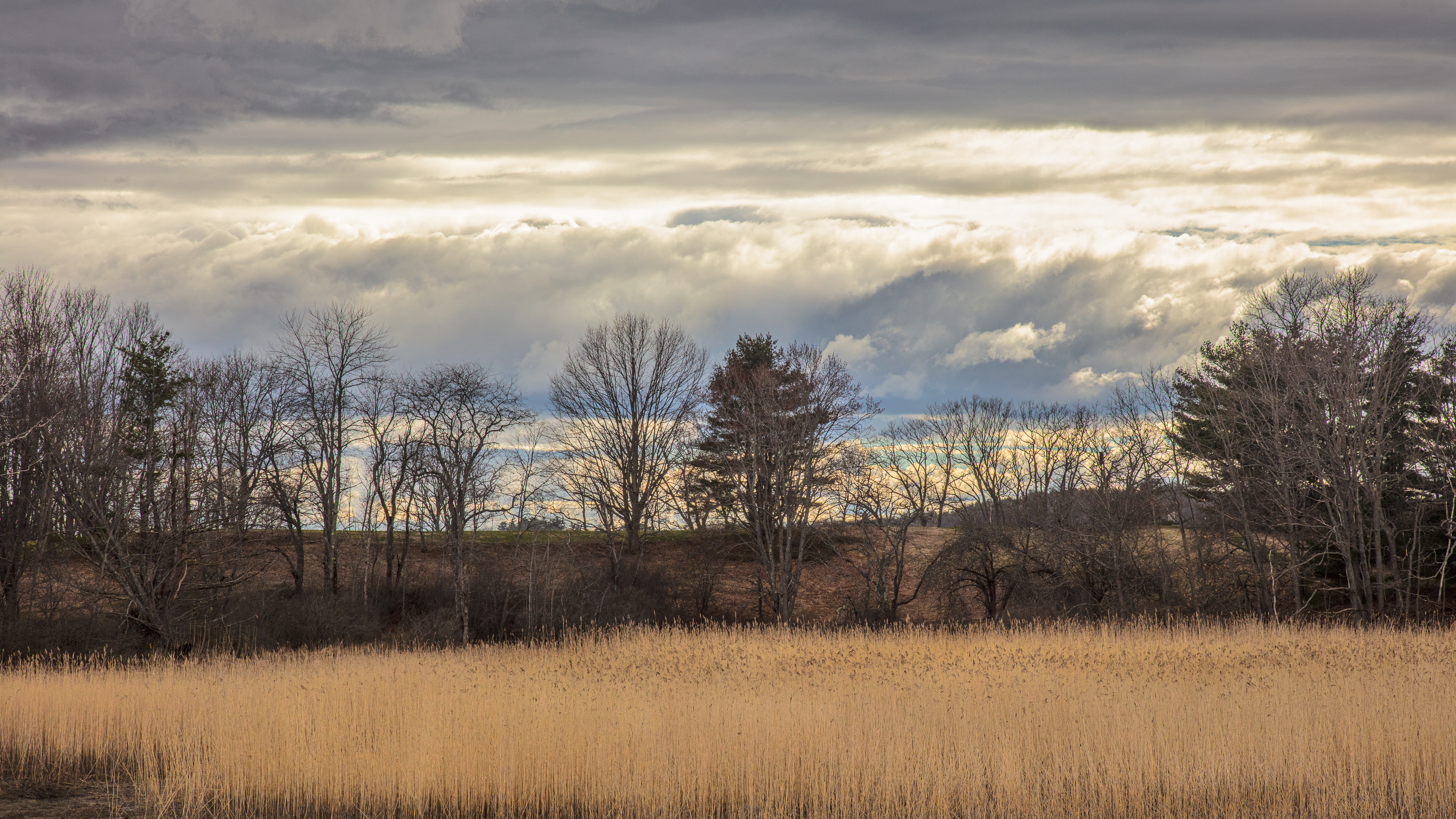
A view of the western side of the farmland

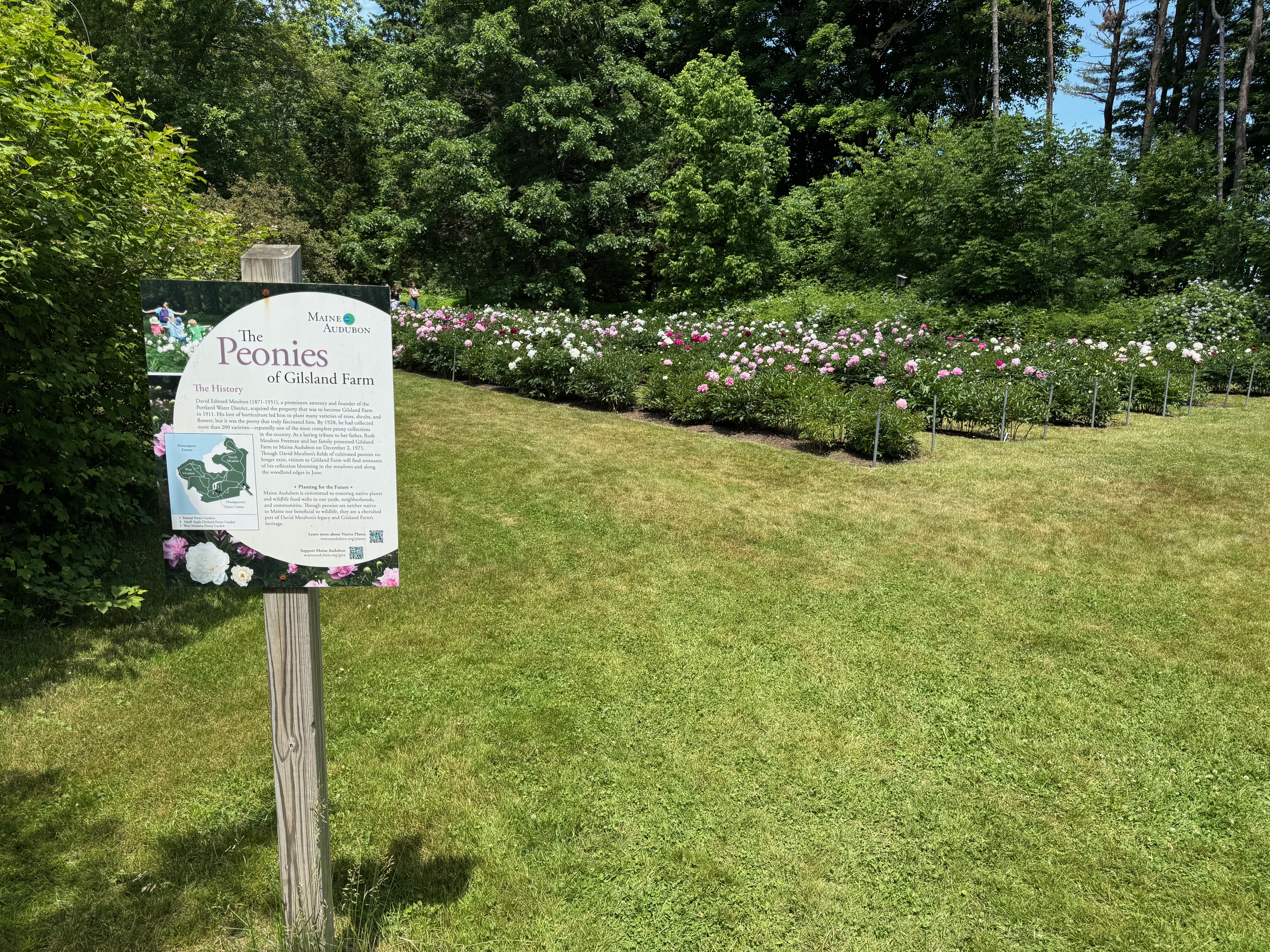
David Moulton's peony garden

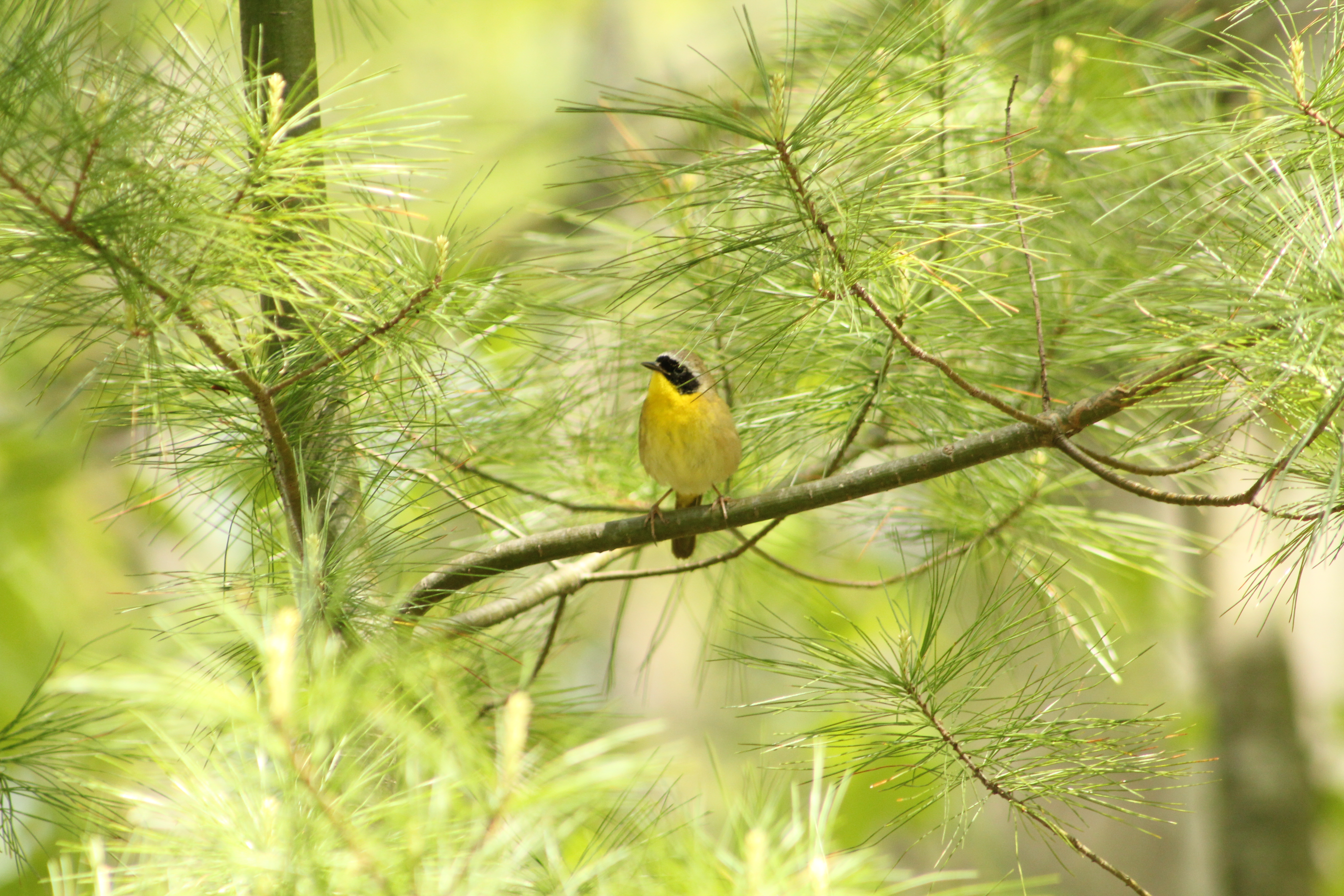
A common yellowthroat at the farm in 2022
