= Science of Education (book) =

Book by Johann Friedrich Herbart

- Author: Johann Friedrich Herbart
- Original title: Erziehungswissenschaft: seine allgemeinen Grundsätze von seinem Ziel und die ästhetische Offenbarung der Welt Abgeleitet
- Translator: Henry M. & Emmie Felkin
- Language: German
- Publication date: 1806
- Publication place: Germany
- Media type: Print (Paperback)
- Pages: 266 (first published edition)

Science of Education (full title: Science of Education: Its General Principles Deduced from Its Aim and the Aesthetic Revelation of the World) is a book written by the German empiricist Johann Friedrich Herbart. It was first published in German in 1806, and the first English printing was in 1902. Herbart emphasized education as the way for an individual to fulfill his potential and created a scientific method to help him do so. The Science of Education advocated a five-step methodology that appeals to learner's interests and applies content back to morals and daily life. Teachers can be found in Germany, England, and the United States who are still implementing this pedagogy today.

== Overview ==
Herbart's theory of education was called Herbartanism. He held that the psychological process of learning should be taken into account when devising curricula and goals for education. He emphasized the importance of using social and physical environments to promote learning in the classroom. Herbart held that there were five formal steps to teaching:

- Relate new material to relevant past ideas in order to engage the students.
- Present new material through experience and/or manipulative.
- Associate new ideas to old through comparison of similarities and differences.
- Generalize material, especially with younger students to show the relationships between ideas and objects in the world.
- Apply acquired knowledge in a relevant way to clearly interpret life. In this step, the student must make this connection his/her own, applying it to his/her own life

Because Herbart believed that a science of education was possible, he supported the idea that education should be an acceptable area of study in higher education.

== Summary ==
=== Book I ===
In the first book Herbart discusses the general aim of education. The teacher is a guide to moral development of students and must create a relationship with the students that enables them to construct an inner censor for good and evil. Herbart also discusses the role of the authority in the education of children. He concluded that there are two kinds of children, those who will fear punishment and want to avoid it and those whose desires will overcome their fear of authority. Learners should be taught to fear authority but also take risks so that boys can become men. The first book also includes Herbart's discussion on the individuality of students and the many different elements that play into a child's morality.

=== Book II ===
The second book examines the many sides of learners—the multitude of influences and characteristics that each learner brings to the table. Educators need to understand that the only influence they have over learners is the freedom of choice. Educators can influence their students by giving options to potentially more profitable inquiry. Learners come with many different backgrounds, desires, and talents, and the educator needs to facilitate learner's growth in many respects as opposed to just their interests. Herbart argues that interests are similar to desires and therefore can be used to help children obey authority. Knowledge and sympathy must be taken into account when choosing which choices to give learners especially when it comes to instruction. The purpose of instruction is to marry nature and humanity. Instruction weaves together the gaps in our experiences and our feelings, but instruction must be systematic as to not confuse the learner.

=== Book III ===
Book three addresses Herbart's deep relationship with morality. He believed that the moral man commands himself. The book discusses the positive and negative sides of morality as well as moral judgement. The categorical imperative expresses a judgment of oneself in light of one's recognition of the other. Herbart defines how moral character reveals itself when presented with different situations and how our character forms as a result of these natural experiences. Finally, Herbart addresses discipline and how it can affect the formation of one's character as well as the proper ways to employ it.
