= Falmouth Memorial Library =

Public library in Falmouth, Maine

Coordinates: 43.723°N 70.2361°W

- Location: Falmouth, Maine, United States
- Type: Public
- Established: 1944

Collection
- Size: 40,828 books, 15,087 Ebooks (2020)

Access and use
- Circulation: 48,633 (2020) (Note: Lower amount due to both the COVID-19 pandemic, as well as in-progress renovations)
- Population served: 12,440 (2020)

Other information
- Budget: US$564,888 (2020)
- Director: Jenna Mayotte
- Employees: 11
- Website: https://www.falmouthmemoriallibrary.org

The Falmouth Memorial Library is the public library serving Falmouth, Maine. The library is a private non-profit organization.

The library is a member of the Minerva consortium of Maine libraries (shared catalog system) and participates in the MARVEL! statewide virtual library service which provides access to full-text articles, citations, and abstract information from newspapers, magazines, and journals.

== History ==
Opened in 1952, the library currently occupies the Iverson House, formerly a private residence (built in 1908). An addition, doubling the library's size, was constructed in 1995.

Starting in May 2019, funded by community donations, the library began an almost full renovation, adding new rooms and technological improvements. During this time, the library's collection was moved to the Mason-Motz Activity Center at the Plummer-Motz School. The renovations were completed in August 2020, and curbside pickup (due to the COVID-19 pandemic) began in October.
