= Albanifriedhof =

Cemetery in Gottingen, Germany

Coordinates: 51°31′55″N 9°56′31″E

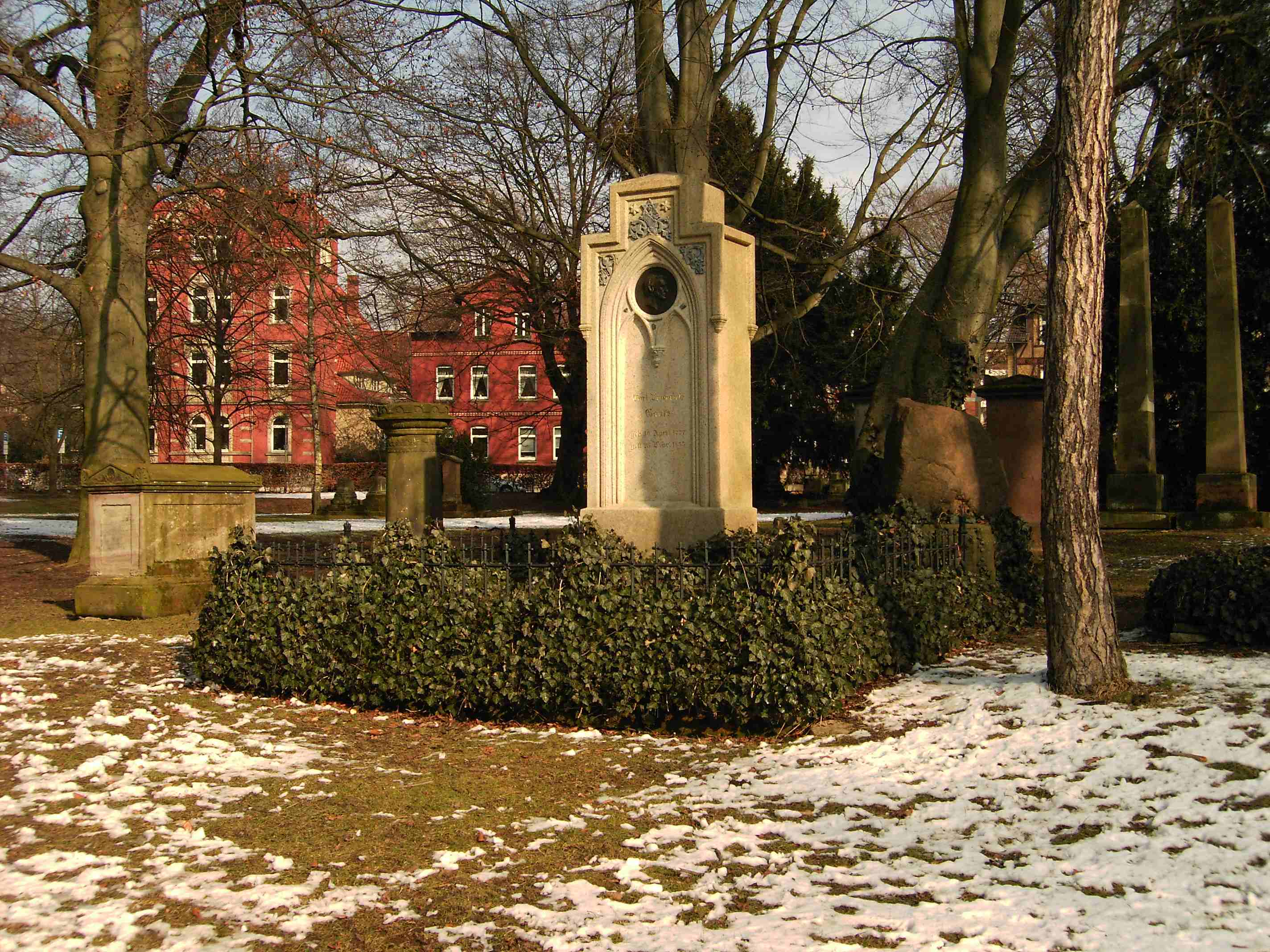
Grave of C.F. Gauss

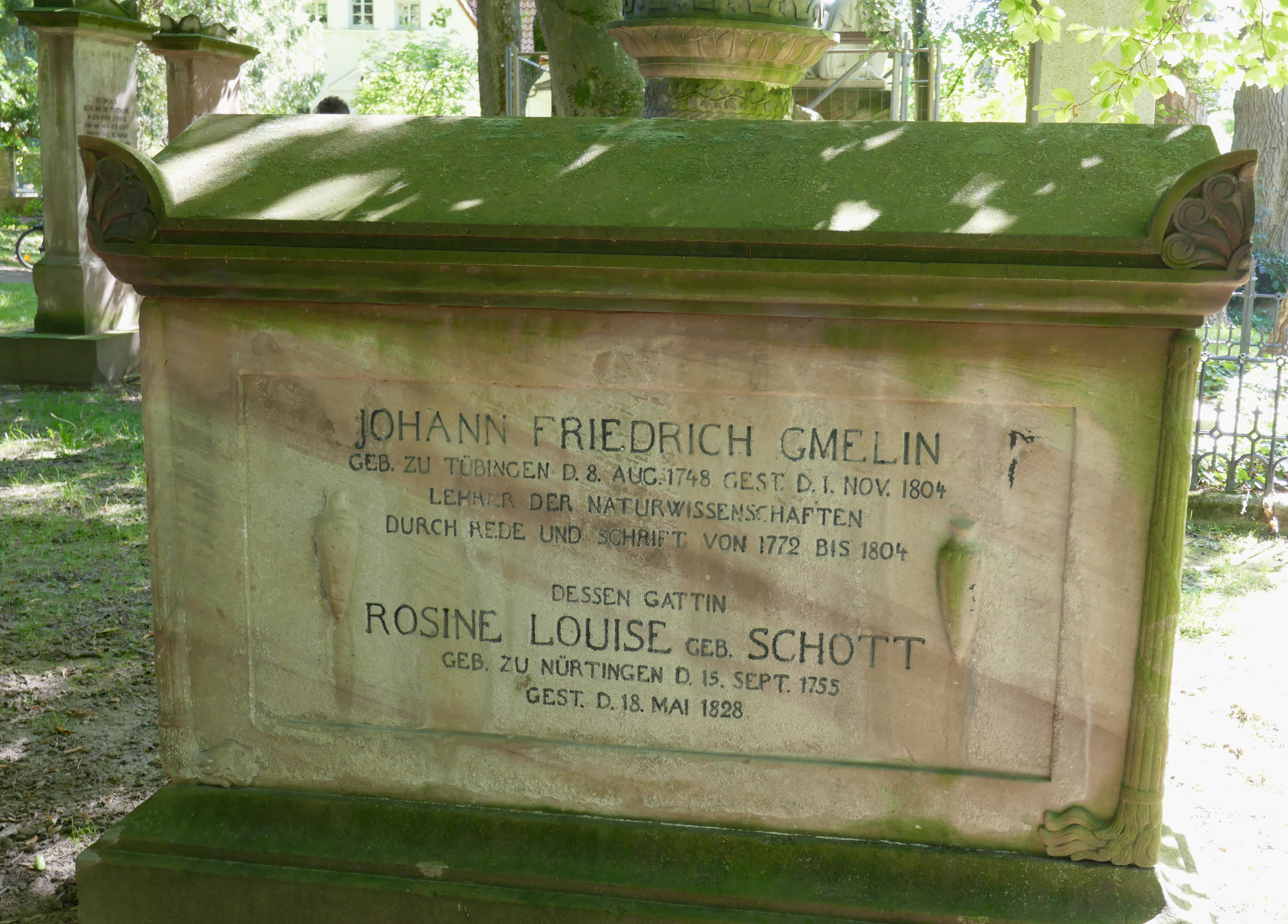
Tomb of J.F. Gmelin and his wife

Albanifriedhof is a cemetery in Göttingen, Germany, just outside the city wall to the southeast. It is most famous as the final resting place of Carl Friedrich Gauss.The cemetery is named after the adjacent St Albani Evangelical Lutheran Church.

== Notable interments ==
- Johann Carl Friedrich Gauss (1777–1855), mathematician and scientist
- Johann Friedrich Gmelin (1748–1804), naturalist, botanist, entomologist and malacologist
- Johann Friedrich Blumenbach (1752–1840), zoologist, anthropologist
- Johann Friedrich Herbart (1776–1841), philosopher, psychologist, and founder of pedagogy as an academic discipline
- Otto Jahn (1813–1869), archaeologist, philologist, and writer on art and music
- Rudolf Hermann Lotze (1817–1881), philosopher and logician
