= Falmouth, Maine =

- Town
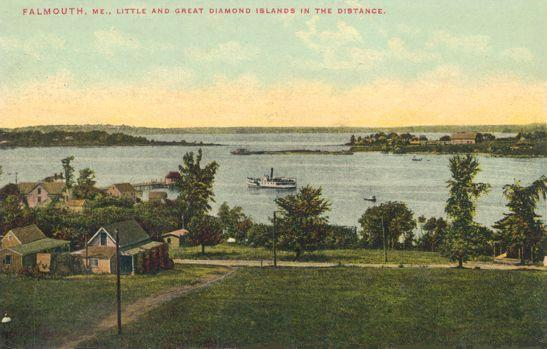
- Casco Bay in 1910

- Seal

- Location in Cumberland County and the state of Maine.
- Coordinates: 43°44′50″N 70°15′33″W
- Country: United States
- State: Maine
- County: Cumberland
- Incorporated: November 12, 1718
- Communities: Falmouth; Falmouth Foreside; Blackstrap; Casco Terrace; Highland Lake; Mackworth Point; North Falmouth; Pleasant Hill; Waites Landing; West Falmouth Corner; York Landing

Area
  - Total: 36.34 sq mi (94.12 km^{2})
  - Land: 29.38 sq mi (76.09 km^{2})
  - Water: 6.96 sq mi (18.03 km^{2})
- Elevation: 108 ft (33 m)

Population (2020)
  - Total: 12,444
  - Density: 423/sq mi (163.5/km^{2})
- Time zone: UTC-5 (Eastern (EST))
  - Summer (DST): UTC-4 (EDT)
- ZIP code: 04105
- Area code: 207
- FIPS code: 23-24495
- GNIS feature ID: 582472
- Website: www.falmouthme.org

Falmouth (/ˈfælməθ/ FAL-məth) is a town in Cumberland County, Maine, United States. The population was 12,444 at the 2020 census. It is part of the Portland-South Portland-Biddeford metropolitan area.

A northern suburb of Portland, Falmouth borders Casco Bay and offers one of the largest anchorages in Maine.

== History ==
=== Native Americans ===
Native Americans followed receding glaciers into Maine around 11,000 BCE. At the time of European contact in the sixteenth century, people speaking an eastern dialect of the Abenaki-Pennacook language inhabited present-day Falmouth. In 1614, Captain John Smith observed a local Abenaki-Pennacook band whom he called "Aucocisco" (spelled various) living around western Casco Bay. The regional expert Alvin Morrison chose not call this band "Aucocisco" but simply the "Presumpscot River Wabanaki". Their main summer town was located on the lower Presumpscot, where they grew corn as well as beans and squash. Ten years later, English explorer Christopher Levett met with the Sagamore Skitterygusset at his summer fishing camp at Presumpscot Falls. Their meeting was reported as very positive, however, Levett was unable to return as promised due to unforeseen circumstances.

A combination of warfare and disease decimated Native peoples in the years before English colonization, creating a shatter zone of devastation and political instability in what would become southern Maine. The introduction of European wares in the 1500s reoriented long-standing Native trade relationships in the Gulf of Maine. Warfare soon broke out among groups such as the Mi'kmaq and Penobscot who sought to subjugate their neighbours by monopolizing access to European goods. The arrival of foreign pathogens only served to compound the upheaval in the region. A particularly notorious epidemic between 1614 and 1620 ravaged the population of coastal New England with mortality rates at upwards of 90 percent. Native peoples were not totally destroyed however, maintaining a visible presence in the Casco Bay area until King George's War in the 1740s. French military defeats and increasing settler migration to the area from the southern New England Colonies impelled most Native Americans to assimilate into British colonial society, migrate toward the protection of New France or further up the coast where they remain today.

=== New Casco (1630–1765) ===
Falmouth's original bounds encompassed the present day cities of Portland, South Portland, Westbrook and Cape Elizabeth. Today's town was known as New Casco, and was only a neighborhood within the larger collection of communities around Casco Bay centered in what is downtown Portland. Falmouth's early years were marked by extreme violence as it lay on a borderland zone between Europeans and Native Americans. Casco Bay represented the northernmost point of British colonial settlement on the east coast until 1713. Numerous wars between 1675 and 1763 among the British, French, and Native Americans rarely left Falmouth unscathed from the violence. English colonists twice abandoned Casco Bay altogether under pressure from French and Indian attacks in 1676 and 1690.

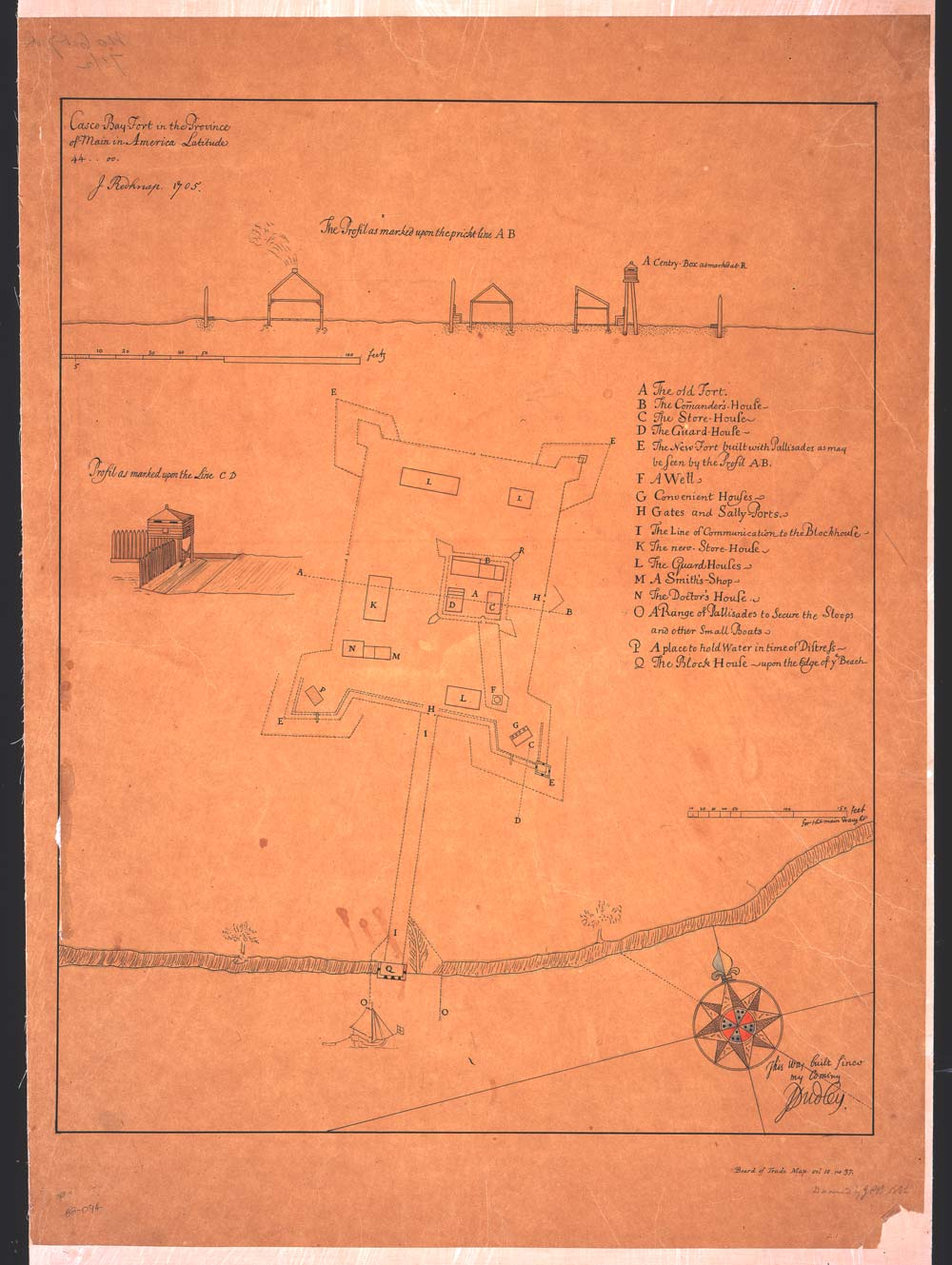
A rendering of Fort Casco in 1705

The first European resident was Arthur Mackworth, who lived on the east bank of the Presumpscot River as early as 1630. When the Massachusetts Bay Colony took political control of Maine in 1658 from the heirs of Sir Ferdinando Gorges, they renamed the area Falmouth after an important Parliamentarian victory in the English Civil War. Colloquially known as "Falmouth in Casco Bay" to distinguish it from Falmouth, Massachusetts on Cape Cod, it was the 7th town in the recently formed Province of Maine, later being formally incorporated on November 12, 1718.

One of the earliest structures in the town of Falmouth was a palisaded fort and trading post named Fort Casco built in 1698 at the conclusion of King William's War. The location of the fort can be found today opposite Pine Grove Cemetery on Route 88. Massachusetts built the fort at the behest of local Abenaki desiring a convenient place to trade and repair tools and weapons. A 1701 meeting between the Wabanaki leaders and Massachusetts officials cemented an alliance between the two. A pair of stone cairns were then erected to symbolize the new partnership. The nearby Two Brothers Islands later received their name from this now long-forgotten monument.

The peace lasted less than three years. With the inauguration of Queen Anne's War in 1702. Governor Joseph Dudley held a conference at New Casco with representatives of the Abenaki tribes on June 20, 1703, trying to convince them not to ally with the French. His efforts were unsuccessful, as the fort was besieged only two months later by Abenaki Sagamores Moxus, Wanungonet, Assacombuit and their French Allies during the Northeast Coast Campaign. The arrival of the Massachusetts ship Province Galley relieved the fort by dispersing the Wabanaki and the some 500 French with its guns. Peace returned in 1713 with the Treaty of Portsmouth. When the resettlement of present-day Portland began in 1716, the Province of Massachusetts ordered that the fort at New Casco be demolished rather than maintain it.

New Casco was not permanently settled by British colonists until the fall of Quebec in 1759 permanently removed the threat of French and Indian attacks. Living so far away from Portland was dangerous: only one family lived in the town in 1725. An Indian raid in 1745 and the murder of Job Burnal in 1751 represented the risks colonists undertook to live in the area. The majority of the first permanent European inhabitants to the town came after 1740, quickly growing to "62 families" and forming their own parish in 1753 (currently the Falmouth Congregational Church). The population of Falmouth would hover between 1,000 and 2,000 residents for the next two centuries. These residents engaged in farming, fishing, and harvesting masts. Mills on the Presumpscot River, Piscataqua River in West Falmouth, and Mussel Cove powered sawmills, processed agricultural products, and manufactured finished goods by the 1800s.

=== Modern Falmouth ===
In 1765 Cape Elizabeth (then including South Portland) seceded from Falmouth. In 1786, Portland broke away, followed in 1814 by Westbrook, although boundaries between it and Falmouth were readjusted throughout the nineteenth century. Logistics were the reason for these separations. Population had grown by the 1760s to the extent that separate church parishes had formed, creating rival communities more attuned to local concerns. People also complained about the distance between outer areas and the center of the town in present-day Portland. By 1859, fishing and farming were principal trades. Other industries included three shipbuilders, three brickmakers, a sawmill, gristmill and tannery. In 1886, the town also produced boots, shoes, tinware and carriage stock.

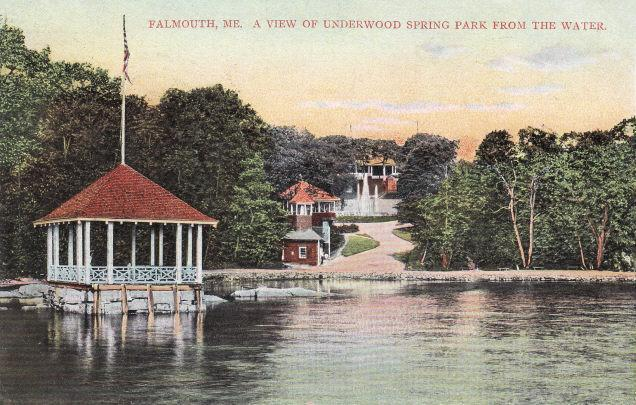
Underwood Spring Park in 1906

The extension of trolley service from Portland to the Falmouth Foreside in 1898 initiated the town's transformation from a rural community to an urban consumer society. Trolleys cemented Falmouth's economic connection to Portland and transformed the Foreside neighborhood into a relaxation spot for nearby city dwellers. Portland's Yankee elites relocated the Portland Yacht Club and Portland Country Club to Falmouth in 1885 and 1913 respectively, where they have remained ever since. To promote its line, the Portland and Yarmouth Electric Railway Company opened Underwood Spring Park north of Town Landing in 1899. The park's attractions included a casino, hotel, and outdoor theater. Fire destroyed Underwood Spring Park in 1907 and was not rebuilt. The Portland–Lewiston Interurban also ran up today's Route 100 in West Falmouth. People's growing preference for the automobile spelled the end for trolleys, which ended service in 1933.

In 1943, Percival Proctor Baxter donated Mackworth Island to the state as a wildlife refuge; today it is site of the state school for the deaf and hard of hearing.

The advent of the automobile accelerated Falmouth's transition toward becoming a residential suburb of Portland. Military personnel who moved to the town while Casco Bay was base Sail for America's destroyer fleet from 1941 to 1944 bolstered much of this growth. Like many urban areas in the United States during the mid-twentieth century, the automobile, cheaper residential taxes, and the desire for open space channeled an urban exodus away from cities like Portland into neighboring towns such as Falmouth. In the span of fifty years the town's population has skyrocketed from five thousand to over ten thousand residents today. Falmouth's location on the ocean, along with its respected public school system, has made it one of the more attractive communities in Greater Portland. This demand consequently led developers to construct two additional country clubs in 1986 and 1988. The nature of such enclosed neighborhoods and other high-scale subdivisions like it has only recently turned the town into one of the most affluent in Maine.

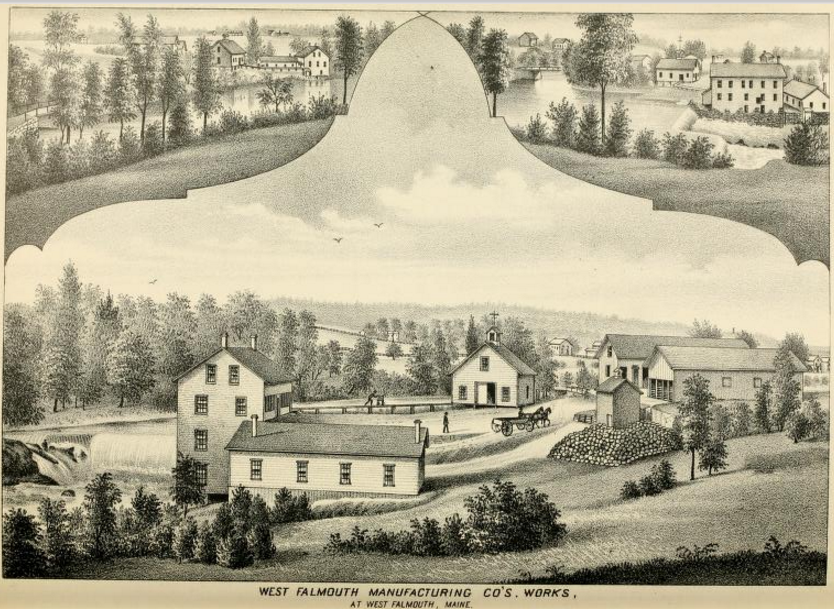
West Falmouth Manufacturing Company, 1880.

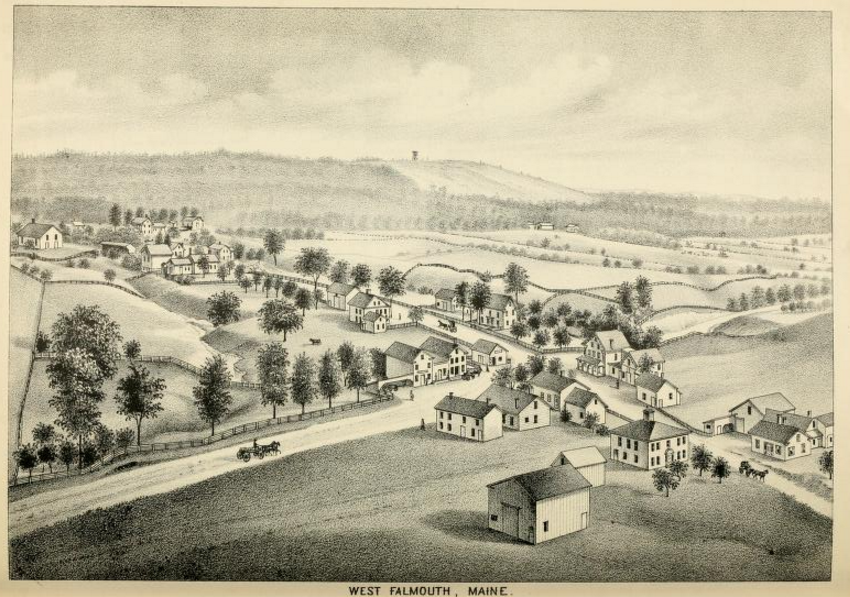
Downtown West Falmouth, 1880.

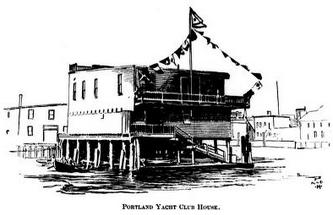
Portland Yacht Club House c. 1894

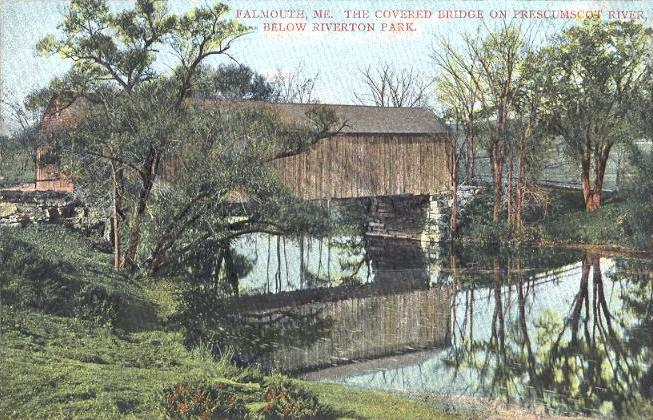
Presumpscot River c. 1910

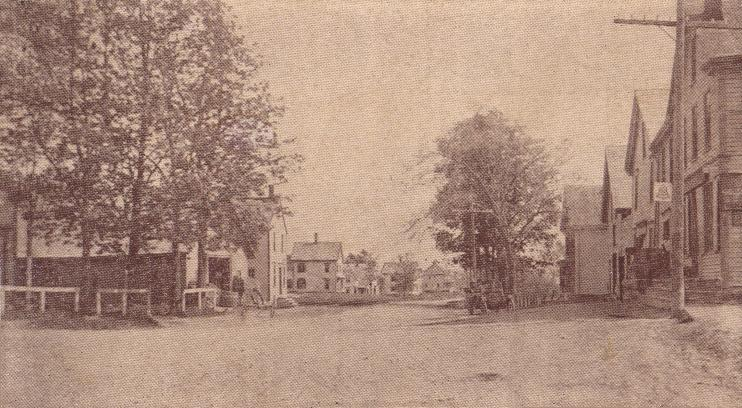
West Falmouth in 1917

== Geography ==
According to the United States Census Bureau, the town has a total area of 36.34 square miles (94.12 km^{2}), of which 29.38 square miles (76.09 km^{2}) is land and 6.96 square miles (18.03 km^{2}) is water. Located beside Casco Bay, the Gulf of Maine and Atlantic Ocean, Falmouth is drained by the Presumpscot River.

Interstate 95 and 295 cross the town in addition to U. S. Route 1 and state routes 9, 26, 88 and 100. It borders the towns of Cumberland to the northeast, Westbrook and Portland to the southwest, and Windham to the northwest. There are two census-designated places occupying the eastern portion of the town: Falmouth CDP to the south and Falmouth Foreside to the north.

== Demographics ==
Historical population
Census	Pop.	Note	%±
1790	2,994		—
1800	3,422		14.3%
1810	4,105		20.0%
1820	1,679		−59.1%
1830	1,966		17.1%
1840	2,071		5.3%
1850	2,157		4.2%
1860	1,935		−10.3%
1870	1,730		−10.6%
1880	1,622		−6.2%
1890	1,580		−2.6%
1900	1,511		−4.4%
1910	1,488		−1.5%
1920	1,542		3.6%
1930	2,041		32.4%
1940	2,883		41.3%
1950	4,342		50.6%
1960	5,976		37.6%
1970	6,291		5.3%
1980	6,853		8.9%
1990	7,610		11.0%
2000	10,310		35.5%
2010	11,185		8.5%
2020	12,444		11.3%

As of 2000 the median income for a household in the town was $66,855, and the median income for a family was $87,304. Males had a median income of $54,545 versus $35,258 for females. The per capita income for the town was $36,716. About 1.8% of families and 3.7% of the population were below the poverty line, including 3.2% of those under age 18 and 4.7% of those age 65 or over.

=== 2010 census ===
As of the census of 2010, there were 11,185 people, 4,334 households, and 3,063 families residing in the town. The population density was 380.7 inhabitants per square mile (147.0/km^{2}). There were 4,751 housing units at an average density of 161.7 per square mile (62.4/km^{2}). The racial makeup of the town was 95.4% White, 0.5% African American, 0.2% Native American, 2.3% Asian, 0.4% from other races, and 1.2% from two or more races. Hispanic or Latino of any race were 1.3% of the population.

There were 4,334 households, of which 36.5% had children under the age of 18 living with them, 60.9% were married couples living together, 6.7% had a female householder with no husband present, 3.1% had a male householder with no wife present, and 29.3% were non-families. 24.0% of all households were made up of individuals, and 12.8% had someone living alone who was 65 years of age or older. The average household size was 2.54 and the average family size was 3.05.

The median age in the town was 45.3 years. 25.9% of residents were under the age of 18; 4.3% were between the ages of 18 and 24; 19.2% were from 25 to 44; 33.6% were from 45 to 64; and 16.8% were 65 years of age or older. The gender makeup of the town was 47.9% male and 52.1% female.

== Sites of interest ==
- Falmouth Historical Society & Museum
- Falmouth Memorial Library
- Falmouth Nature Preserve
- Gilsland Farm Audubon Center
- Mackworth Island Public Reserved Land
- Maine State Ballet Theatre
- Governor Baxter School for the Deaf
- Falmouth High School

== Education ==
Until June 2011, the town had a K–12 school system that included four individual school buildings. Lunt School included grades K–2 followed by Plummer-Motz which contained grades 3–4. Falmouth Middle School incorporated grades 5–8 and Falmouth High School contained grades 9–12. A new building, Falmouth Elementary School, opened in the fall of 2011. It was dedicated on September 17, 2011. The new elementary school contains grades K–5, replacing both Lunt School and Plummer-Motz. Falmouth Middle School now contains grades 6–8. The School Department is under the jurisdiction of the Falmouth School Board with participation of the Leadership Council and Superintendent of the Schools. Falmouth sports teams were known as the Yachtsmen until 2021, when the school board voted to change the nickname to the Navigators, citing concerns with gender bias and elitism.

The Falmouth School Department is considered well above average by Maine state standards. Falmouth was named the "Top City to Live and Learn" by Forbes in 2011.

== Public amenities ==
Mackworth Island was donated by former Governor Percival Baxter. The Governor Baxter School for the Deaf occupies the center of the island and the remainder is a state park accessible to the public, with an oceanside walking trail around the perimeter. Clapboard Island, located a mile off Falmouth Town Land and accessible by kayak and canoe, includes a nature preserve administered by the Maine Coast Heritage Trust.

== Notable people ==
- Mary Cunningham Agee, CEO of Aurea Estate Wines, Inc.
- William Cranch Bond, astronomer
- Cathy Breen, Maine state legislator
- Joseph Cummings, president of Wesleyan and Northwestern universities
- Gerald Davis, state legislator
- Rob Derhak, musician and band member of moe
- Frank Fixaris, sportscaster
- G Hannelius, actress
- Roger Levesque, retired soccer player for the Seattle Sounders FC
- Mercy Lewis, accuser during the Salem witch trials
- Helen Longley, former First Lady of Maine
- Amy Kuhn, state legislator and resident of Falmouth
- Bob Marley, comedian
- John R. McKernan Jr., U.S. congressman, 71st governor of Maine
- John Menario, Portland city manager and candidate for governor of Maine
- Gary Merrill, actor
- Stanley C. Norton, Rear admiral in the U.S. Navy and Navy Cross recipient
- Joan Whitney Payson, co-founder and owner of MLB's New York Mets
- David D. Pearce, U.S. ambassador to Algeria
- Sheri Piers, distance runner
- Richard Rockefeller, physician, great-grandson of John D. Rockefeller Jr.
- Marguerite H. Smith, politician
- Olympia Snowe, U.S. senator
- Scott Wilson, appellate judge

== Popular culture ==
Falmouth has been featured in several short stories and novels by author Stephen King including "One for the Road", "Jerusalem's Lot", and most notably in "Salem's Lot".
