= Marguerite H. Smith =

American politician

Marguerite H. Smith was a state legislator in Maine. She lived in Falmouth, Maine and represented Cumberland County, Maine in 1957, 1959, 1961, and 1963. She was a Republican.
