= Margaret Taylor Smith =

American author and social activist)

Margaret Taylor Smith is an American author and social activist, and was chair of the Kresge Foundation until 1998. She received an A.B. in 1947 from Duke University, where the Margaret Taylor Smith Directorship in Women's Studies is named for her.
