= Margaret Gladys Smith =

American pathologist

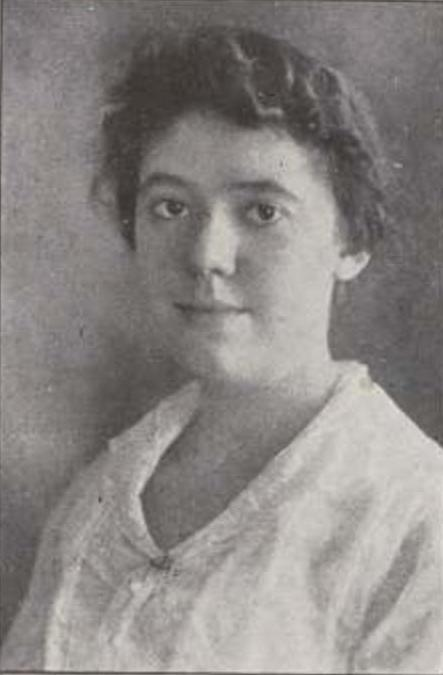
- Born: February 10, 1896; Carnegie, Pennsylvania, U.S.
- Died: May 1, 1970 (aged 74); Webster Groves, Missouri, U.S.
- Alma mater: Mount Holyoke College; Johns Hopkins School of Medicine
- Occupation: Pathologist
- Employer: Johns Hopkins School of Medicine (1922–1929); Washington University School of Medicine (1929–)

Margaret Gladys Smith (10 February 1896 – 1 May 1970) was a pathologist who spent over forty years working at the Washington University School of Medicine. Perhaps best known for her work with the St. Louis encephalitis virus, she has also been referred to as a founder of pediatric pathology and the "mother of cytomegalovirus."

== Early life and education ==
Margaret Gladys was born in 1896 in Carnegie, Pennsylvania. She was the daughter of machine shop foreman William Smith.

Smith earned an A.B. degree in chemistry from Mount Holyoke College in 1918. She chose medical school over graduate study in chemistry and entered the Johns Hopkins School of Medicine, one of the few medical schools open to women at the time. After graduating in 1922, she worked for Johns Hopkins University as a pathology assistant, then instructor and pathology associate. Her specialization was influenced by the 1918 influenza epidemic; she recalled seeing stacks of pine coffins outside the morgue at Johns Hopkins. She also recalled a handsome pathology assistant: "I had a foolish crush on him but from that personal interest came my first interest in pathology that fortunately was more enduring that the crush."

== Career ==
Smith was hired as assistant professor of pathology by the Washington University in St. Louis in 1929, becoming on the second woman to hold that rank at the school. She was paid a salary of $3,250, promptly lowered when the Great Depression hit. Smith became an associate professor in 1943 and full professor in 1957.

In 1933, St. Louis was struck with over a thousand cases of a lethal disease called “sleeping sickness” that was later officially named St. Louis encephalitis. Smith conducted a series of key studies on the spread and elimination of the virus. She also isolated the salivary gland virus (with S. A. Luse), was the first to propagate the herpes simplex virus in a mouse, and the first to discover the cytomegetic inclusion disease virus. Smith, McWhorter et al write "The vast bulk of research on MCMV [murine cytomegalovirus] uses one of two serially passaged laboratory strain of MCMV: Smith or K181. The Smith strain of MCMV was isolated by Margaret Smith in 1954 from the salivary gland tissue of infected laboratory mice."

She and her junior colleague John M. Kissane are considered the founders of pediatric pathology. In 1967, they published the classic textbook on the field, the thousand page Pathology of Infancy and Childhood.

Smith retired in 1964.

== Death and legacy ==
Margaret Gladys Smith died of a heart attack in her home in Webster Groves, Missouri on May 1, 1970.
