= Maggie Smith (ceramist) =

American ceramicist

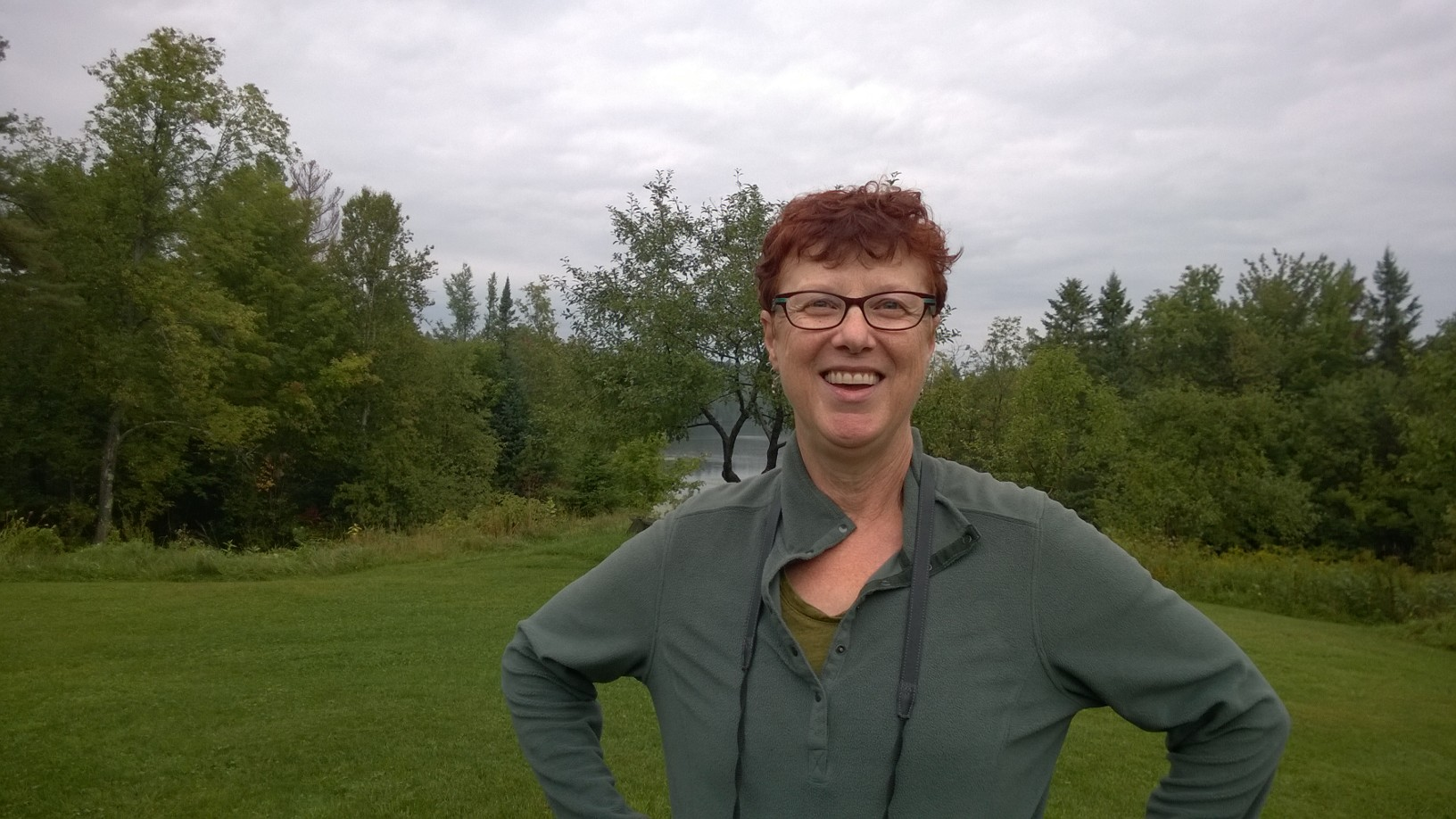
- Born: 1950 (age 75–76); New Hampshire
- Occupation: Ceramist

Maggie Smith (born 1950) is an American ceramist.

Smith was born in New Hampshire, but moved at twenty-seven to Seattle and has resided since 1986 on Bainbridge Island. She runs a ceramics studio but is best known for her public art works, most notably the Salem Witch Trials Memorial and the Oak Grove-Freedman's Cemetery, which were both collaborations with architects. She also worked on realization of the Winslow Way project in Bainbridge. Her work often involves letters.

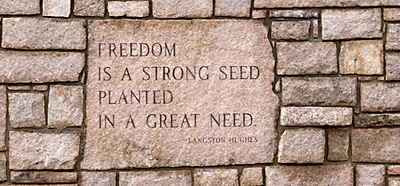
View of the Oak Grove-Freedman's Cemetery, collaboration with Sam Reynolds

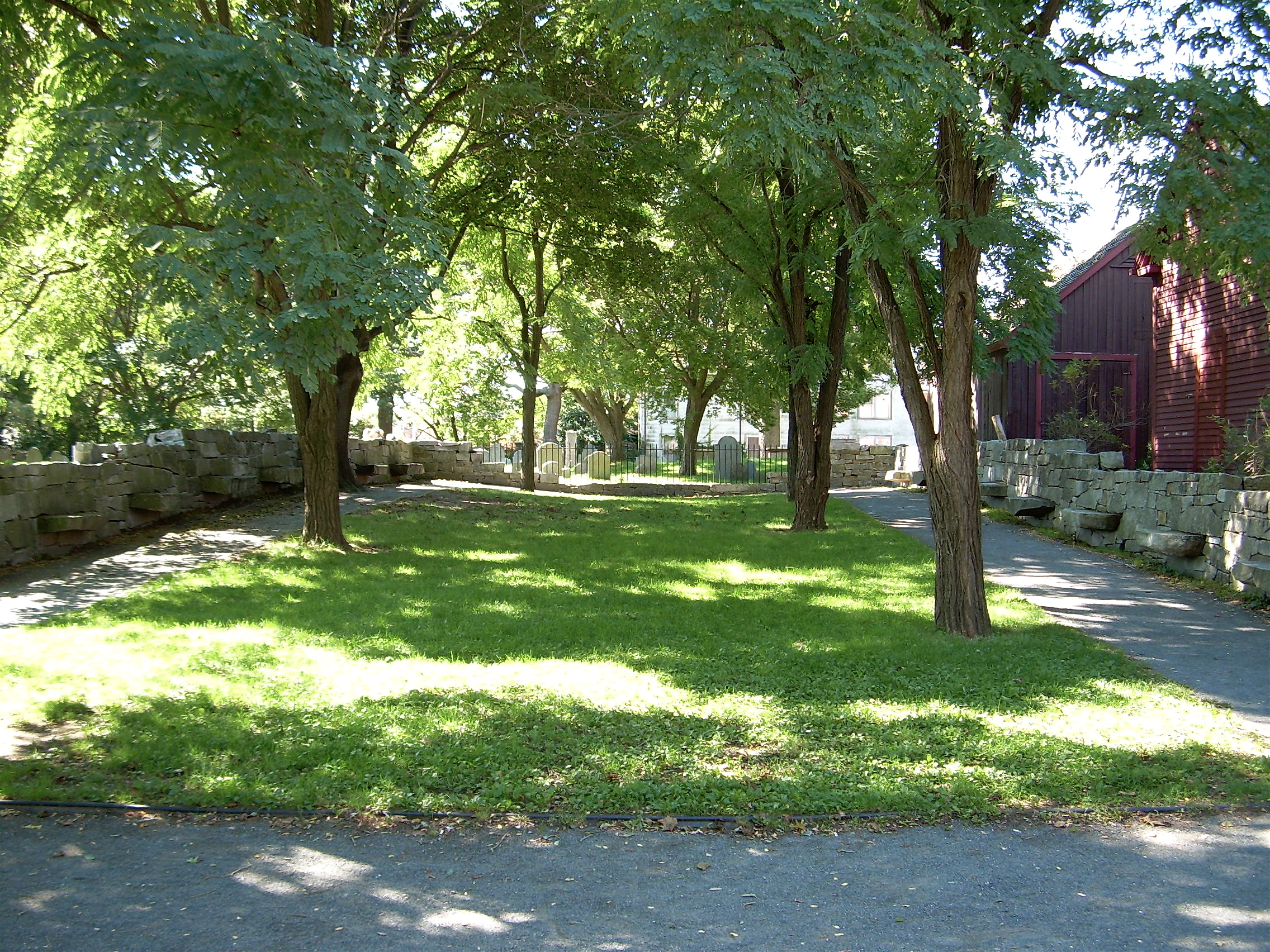
View of the Salem Witch Trials Memorial, collaboration with James Cutler
