= Margaret Keiver Smith =

American psychologist

- Born: 1856; Amherst, Nova Scotia
- Died: 1934 (aged 77–78)
- Education: University of Zurich
- Occupations: Psychologist, researcher

Margaret Keiver Smith (1856–1934) was an American psychologist and psychological and educational researcher.

Born in Amherst, Nova Scotia in 1856, Smith was educated first in Oswego, New York, gaining her diploma in 1883.

She attended the University of Jena, University of Thuringen and Göttingen University, in Germany, and was awarded her PhD by the University of Zurich, in Switzerland, in 1900. From there she returned to the U.S. and became an instructor at the State Normal School of New Paltz, New York, from 1901, rising to professor, and director of geography and psychology.

She died in 1934.

== Selected works ==
- Smith, M. K. (1900). Rhythmus und Albeit (University of Zurich, doctoral dissertation in German). Leipzig: Wilhelm Englemann. 1900.
- Smith, M. K. (1903). The Pedagogical Seminary, 10(4), 438–458. doi:10.1080/08919402.1903.10532728
- Smith, M. K. (1905). The Psychological and Pedagogical Aspect of Language.—(I). Journal of Education, 62(18), 491–493. doi:10.1177/002205740506201802; Part II. doi:10.1177/002205740506201902
- Smith, M. K. (1908). The training of a backward boy. The Psychological Clinic, 2(5), 134.
